= Electoral district of Victoria =

Former electoral district of South Australia

Victoria South Australia—House of Assembly
- State: South Australia
- Created: 1857, 1915
- Abolished: 1902, 1993
- Namesake: Queen Victoria
- Demographic: Rural
- Coordinates: 37.5°S 140.5°E

Victoria was an electorate in the South Australian House of Assembly from 1857 until 1902 and from 1915 to 1993.

In 1902 the district was merged with Albert to create Victoria and Albert, but was separated again in 1915, electing candidates of both major parties at various times. However, after 1956, it was held by the Liberal and Country League and its successor, the Liberal Party, usually without serious difficulty. It was abolished in 1993 and replaced by the safe Liberal seat of MacKillop.

In 1860, the electorate had booths at Mosquito Plains, Mount Gambier, Penola and Robe. In 1865, it added Port MacDonnell, Bordertown, Kingston, South Australia and Wellington, and Naracoorte in 1868. In 1875, Bordertown, Kingston, Naracoorte, Robe and Wellington were transferred to the new electorate of Albert, and the new Victoria consisted of only Millicent, Mount Gambier, Penola, Port MacDonnell and Tarpeena. Booths were added at Beachport (1883), Tantanoola (1884), Furner (1893) and Kalangadoo (1896).

When the electorate was recreated in 1915, it had booths at Beachport, Bordertown, Conmurra, Frances, Furner, Glencoe, Glenroy, Hynam East, Kalangadoo, Keith, Kincraig, Kingston, Kongorong, Kybybolite, Lochaber, Lucindale, Mount Gambier, Millicent, Mundalla, Penola, Port MacDonnell, Reedy Creek, Rendelsham, Robe, Tantanoola, Wirrega, Wolseley and Yale Paddock. It lost booths at Beachport, Hynam East, Kongorong and Yale Paddock in 1918, but added booths at Hundred of Jessie, Mount McIntyre and Yahl.

In 1938, when it became a single-member district for the first time, Victoria lost a significant number of voters to the new seat of Mount Gambier: the new Victoria covered Beachport, Binnum, Bool Lagoon, Conmurra, Coonawarra, Frances, Furner, Glenroy, Hatherleigh, Hynam, Hundred of Jessie, Kalangadoo, Kingston, Kybybolite, Lochaber, Lucindale, Millicent, Mount Benson, Mount Burr, Mount McIntyre, Nangula, Naracoorte, Penola, Reedy Creek, Rendelsham, Robe and Tantanoola.

The seat of Millicent (1956–1977) came from the south of the seat of Victoria.

== Members for Victoria ==
Single member (1857–1862)
Member	Party	Term
Robert Leake		1857–1857
George Hawker		1858–1865

Two members (1862–1902)
Member	Party	Term	Member	Party	Term
George Hawker		1862–1865	Randolph Stow		1862–1865
Adam Gordon		1865–1866	John Riddoch		1865–1870
James Umpherston		1866–1868	John Riddoch		1865–1870
Henry Kent Hughes		1868–1870	John Riddoch		1865–1870
Park Laurie		1870–1871	William Paltridge		1870–1871
Park Laurie		1870–1871	Neville Blyth		1871–1871
John Riddoch		1871–1873	Edwin Derrington		1871–1873
Park Laurie		1873–1875	T. Wilde Boothby		1873–1875
George Hawker		1875–1883	John Ingleby		1875–1877
George Hawker		1875–1883	Lavington Glyde		1877–1884
William Whinham		1883–1884	Lavington Glyde		1877–1884
Friedrich Krichauff		1884–1890	John Bagot		1884–1887
Friedrich Krichauff		1884–1890	Daniel Livingston		1887–1888
Friedrich Krichauff		1884–1890	John Osman		1888–1893
James Cock		1890–1899	John Osman		1888–1893
James Cock		1890–1899	George Riddoch	Defence League	1893–1896
James Cock		1890–1899	James Morris		1896–1902
John Livingston		1899–1902	James Morris		1896–1902
Two members (1915–1938)
Member	Party	Term	Member	Party	Term
Peter Reidy	Labor	1915–1917	Clarence Goode	Labor	1915–1917
Peter Reidy	National	1917–1923	Clarence Goode	National	1917–1918
Peter Reidy	National	1917–1923	Vernon Petherick	Liberal Union	1918–1923
Peter Reidy	Liberal Federation	1923–1932	Vernon Petherick	Liberal Federation	1923–1924
Peter Reidy	Liberal Federation	1923–1932	Eric Shepherd	Labor	1924–1933
Peter Reidy	Liberal Federation	1923–1932	Eric Shepherd	Parliamentary Labor	1931–1933
Vernon Petherick	Liberal and Country	1932–1938	Eric Shepherd	Parliamentary Labor	1931–1933
Vernon Petherick	Liberal and Country	1932–1938	Ronald Hunt	Liberal and Country	1933–1938

Single-member (1938–1993)
Member	Party	Term
Clement Smith	Independent	1938–1941
Vernon Petherick	Liberal and Country	1941–1945
Jim Corcoran	Labor	1945–1947
Roy McLachlan	Liberal and Country	1947–1953
Jim Corcoran	Labor	1953–1956
Leslie Harding	Liberal and Country	1956–1965
Allan Rodda	Liberal and Country	1965–1974
Allan Rodda	Liberal	1974–1985
Dale Baker	Liberal	1985–1993
