= Electoral district of Victoria and Albert =

Former state electoral district of South Australia

Victoria and Albert South Australia—House of Assembly
- State: South Australia
- Created: 1902
- Abolished: 1915
- Namesake: Queen Victoria and Albert, Prince Consort
- Demographic: Rural
- Coordinates: 35.5°S 140°E

Victoria and Albert was an electoral district in the South Australian House of Assembly from 1902 to 1915. The seat elected candidates of both major parties at various times. It merged the seats of Victoria and Albert, which were both recreated on its abolition.

At its creation in 1902, it included booths at Beachport, Bordertown, Conmurra, Cookes Plains, East Wellington, Frances, Furner, Glenroy, Holder, Kalangadoo, Keith, Kingston SE, Kingston On Murray, Lucindale, Lyrup, Meningie, Millicent, Mount Gambier, Murtho, Naracoorte, Nildottie, Mundalla, Paisley, Penola, Point McLeay, Port MacDonnell, Pyap, Robe, Tantanoola, Waikerie and Wolseley. It added booths at Coonalpyn, Glencoe and Wow Wow (1905), and Lameroo, Rendelsham and Tailem Bend but dropped Wow Wow (1906). Additional booths in 1910 included Geranium, Kybybolite, Loxton, Parilla, Parrakie, Peake, Pinnaroo, Sherlock, Tintinarra, and Wilkawatt, with Pyap withdrawn. The final election in 1912 saw additional booths at Chapman Bore, Clanfield, Coomandook, Eastern Well, Hampton Well, Hooper, Lochaber, Maidia, Moorlands, Poyntz Bore, Seymour and Wirrega.

The abolition of Victoria and Albert in 1915 saw the re-establishment of its two predecessor electorates in Victoria and Albert, but with different boundaries than their previous incarnations.

== Members for Victoria and Albert ==
Three members
Member	Party	Term	Member	Party	Term	Member	Party	Term
John Livingston		1902–1904	Archibald Peake		1902–1906	Andrew Handyside	National League	1902–1904
John Livingston	Farmers and Producers	1904–1906	Archibald Peake		1902–1906	William Senior	Labor	1904–1912
Donald Campbell	Labor	1906–1912	Archibald Peake	Liberal and Democratic	1906–1910	William Senior	Labor	1904–1912
Donald Campbell	Labor	1906–1912	Archibald Peake	Liberal Union	1910–1915	William Senior	Labor	1904–1912
George Bodey	Liberal Union	1912–1915	Archibald Peake	Liberal Union	1910–1915	William Angus	Liberal Union	1912–1915
