= Southern Ports Highway =

Highway in South Australia

Southern Ports Highway South Australia
- Coordinates: 36.825775°S 139.861427°E (North end); 37.592366°S 140.350487°E (South end)

General information
- Type: Highway
- Length: 118 km (73 mi)
- Route number(s): B101 (1999–present)
- Former route number: Alt National Route 1 (1978–1999)

Major junctions
- North end: Princes Highway; Kingston SE, South Australia
- South end: Princes Highway; Millicent, South Australia

Location(s)
- Region: Limestone Coast
- Major settlements: Mount Benson, Robe, Beachport, Rendelsham

Highway system
- Highways in Australia; National Highway • Freeways in Australia; Highways in South Australia

Southern Ports Highway is a 119 kilometres (74 miles) rural highway in South Australia that connects Kingston SE with Millicent via Rendelsham, Southend, Beachport and Robe. It is a former alignment of Princes Highway, bypassed in 1933.

== Major intersections ==
LGA	Location	km	mi	Destinations	Notes
Kingston	Kingston SE	0.0	0.0	Princes Highway (B1) – Meningie, Adelaide	Northern terminus of highway and route B101
Robe	Robe	41.2	25.6	Main Road – Robe	
Robe	Bray	56.8	35.3	Clay Wells Road – Penola	
Wattle Range	Beachport	86.9	54.0	Millicent-Beachport Road – Beachport	
Wattle Range	Millicent	118	73	Princes Highway (B1) – Tantanoola, Mount Gambier; Mount Burr Road – Penola	Southern terminus of highway and route B101
Route transition

== See also ==
- Highways in Australia
- List of highways in South Australia
