= Nora Creina =

- Suburb
- Coordinates: 37°19′37″S 139°51′03″E
- Country: Australia
- State: South Australia
- Region: Limestone Coast
- LGA: District Council of Robe Wattle Range Council
- Location: 290 km (180 mi) south-east of Adelaide city centre; 99 km (62 mi) north-west of Mount Gambier
- Established: 18 December 1997

Government
  - State electorate: MacKillop
  - Federal division: Barker

Population
  - Total: 37 (SAL 2021)
- Time zone: UTC+9:30 (ACST)
  - Summer (DST): UTC+10:30 (ACST)
- Postcode: 5276
- County: Grey
- Mean max temp: 19.6 °C (67.3 °F)
- Mean min temp: 9.5 °C (49.1 °F)
- Annual rainfall: 581.4 mm (22.89 in)
Suburbs around Nora Creina
Ocean	Robe	Bray
Ocean	Nora Creina	Bray
Ocean	Ocean	Bray; Beachport
- Location; Adjoining localities

Nora Creina is a locality in the Australian state of South Australia located on the state’s south-east coast overlooking the Southern Ocean. It is about 99 kilometres (62 miles) to the north-west of the city of Mount Gambier and about 290 kilometres (180 miles) south-east of the state capital of Adelaide.

Nora Creina was originally the name given to a shack site. Its boundaries were established in 1997 and 1999 respectively for the portions within the Wattle Range Council and the District Council of Robe and include both the Nora Creina Shack Site and Little Dip Shack Area. The locality was given “the long established name” which is presumably derived from Nora Creina Bay which is located within the locality and which was named after Nora Creina Bacon, the daughter of Major General Anthony Bacon and Lady Charlotte Bacon and the wife of Charles Burney Young who was ‘an early settler in the area.’

Nora Creina occupies land along the coastline between the southern shore of Lake Robe in the north and in part by Lake George Road in the south. It is bounded to the east in the north by Lake Eliza and in south by the Southern Ports Highway in the south. It includes the full extent of Lake St Clair.

Land use within the locality consists of agriculture with a strip of land along the coastline being zoned for conservation which includes the protected area known as the Little Dip Conservation Park at its northern end and land on the east side of Lake St Clair which includes the protected area known as the Lake St Clair Conservation Park. A settlement is located to the south-east of the coastline of Nora Creina Bay within the jurisdiction of the District Council of Robe.

The 2016 Australian census which was conducted in August 2016 reported that Nora Creina shared a population of 36 people with the portion of the locality of Bray located within the Wattle Range Council. (Note: For the 2016 census, the ‘State Suburb of Nora Creina’ consisted of the locality of Nora Creina and the portion of the locality of Bray located within the Wattle Range Council.)

Nora Creina is located within the federal Division of Barker, the state electoral district of MacKillop and the local government areas of the District Council of Robe and the Wattle Range Council.
