= Reedy Creek Conservation Park =

Protected area in South Australia

- IUCN category IV (habitat/species management area)
- Location within South Australia
- Location: South Australia
- Nearest city: Beachport
- Coordinates: 37°18′11″S 140°13′50″E
- Area: 1.47 km^{2} (0.57 sq mi)
- Established: 8 March 1973
- Governing body: Department for Environment and Water

Reedy Creek Conservation Park is a protected area located in the Australian state of South Australia in the localities of Clay Wells and Greenways about 300 kilometres (190 mi) south-east of the state capital of Adelaide and about 28 kilometres (17 mi) north of the town of Beachport.

The conservation park consists of land in the following cadastral unit - section 227 of the Hundred of Kennion, section 228 of the Hundred of Fox and sections 154 and 186 of the Hundred of Smith and which occupies the watercourse of Reedy Creek from Clay Wells Road (also known as the Robe - Reedy Creek road) in the south for a distance of about 8.5 kilometres (5.3 mi).

It was proclaimed on 8 March 1973 as a conservation park under the National Parks and Wildlife Act 1972 in respect to sections 154, 227 and 228. On 24 April 1986, Section 186 of the Hundred of Smith was added to the conservation park by proclamation. Both proclamations included the requirement for the South Eastern Drainage Board to have “having full, free and unrestricted right and liberty” to enter the conservation park to carry out duties and functions described in the South Eastern Drainage Act 1931. It was proclaimed because of “its fine stand of river red gums”, however the land continued to be grazed until 1978 due to the existence of a lease over the land. As of 2016, it covered an area of 147 hectares (360 acres).

In 1980, the conservation park's listing on the now-defunct Register of the National Estate argued it to be significant for the following reasons:

The Park represents the only large stand of river red gum in the vicinity. Being a long narrow Park it forms an important corridor of habitat for nomadic and migratory birds such as honeyeaters, notably the uncommon blackchinned honeyeater and parrots. The Park also contains small areas of swampy habitat.

In February 1983, the southern half of the conservation park was burnt during the Ash Wednesday bushfires.

In 1990, the conservation park was described as "an interdunal plain of calcarenite with sandy, mottled yellow duplex soils" covered with vegetation consisting of "a river red gun open forest/woodland community" which gradually changes into a brown stringybark woodland at its western boundary. The conservation park is the only part of the Reedy Creek watercourse which "ensures regeneration of the river red gums" because the rest of the watercourse is used for grazing.

As of 1990, visitation consisted of use “mainly by local residents”. It was also considered to have “potential” for use as an educational resource by the Kangaroo Inn Area School which is located about 0.5 kilometres (0.31 mi) west of the conservation park's southern boundary in the locality of Kangaroo Inn.

The conservation park is classified as an IUCN Category IV protected area.

== See also ==
- Protected areas of South Australia
