= Clay Wells, South Australia =

Clay Wells South Australia
- Coordinates: 37°19′03″S 140°09′22″E
- Population: 31 (SAL 2021)
- Established: 18 December 1997
- Postcode(s): 5280
- Time zone: ACST (UTC+9:30)
  - Summer (DST): ACST (UTC+10:30)
- Location: 300 km (186 mi) SE of Adelaide; 39 km (24 mi) SE of Robe; 35 km (22 mi) NW of Millicent
- LGA(s): District Council of Robe; Wattle Range Council; Naracoorte Lucindale Council (Note: Land within the Naracoorte Lucindale Council consists of part of the watercourse of Reedy Creek.)
- Region: Limestone Coast
- County: Robe; Grey
- State electorate(s): MacKillop
- Federal division(s): Barker
Mean max temp	Mean min temp	Annual rainfall
19.6 °C; 67 °F	9.6 °C; 49 °F	608.5 mm 24 in
Suburbs around Clay Wells:
Bray	Bray; Greenways; Fox	Fox
Bray	Clay Wells	Furner
Magarey	Magarey; Thornlea; Kangaroo Inn	Furner; Kangaroo Inn
- Footnotes: Locations; Adjoining localities

Clay Wells is a locality in the Australian state of South Australia located in the state's south-east within the Limestone Coast region about 300 kilometres (190 mi) south east of the state capital of Adelaide, and about 39 kilometres (24 mi) south-east and about 35 kilometres (22 mi) north-west respectively of the municipal seats of Robe and Millicent.

Boundaries for the locality were created for “the long established name” on 18 December 1997 for the portion within the Wattle Range Council while the portions in the District Council of Lucindale and District Council of Robe were respectively added in 1998 and 1999.

The land use within the locality is ‘primary production’. A protected area known as the Reedy Creek Conservation Park is located in the watercourse of Reedy Creek which passes through the locality and forms part of its eastern boundary.

Clay Wells is located within the federal division of Barker, the state electoral district of MacKillop and the local government areas of the District Council of Robe, the Wattle Range Council and the Naracoorte Lucindale Council.
