= Kangaroo Inn, South Australia =

Kangaroo Inn South Australia
- Coordinates: 37°20′38″S 140°13′55″E
- Population: 0 (SAL 2021)
- Established: 18 December 1997
- Postcode(s): 5280
- Time zone: ACST (UTC+9:30)
  - Summer (DST): ACST (UTC+10:30)
- Location: 306 km (190 mi) SE of Adelaide; 46 km (29 mi) SE of Robe; 30 km (19 mi) NW of Millicent
- LGA(s): District Council of Robe; Wattle Range Council
- Region: Limestone Coast
- County: Robe; Grey
- State electorate(s): MacKillop
- Federal division(s): Barker
Mean max temp	Mean min temp	Annual rainfall
19.6 °C; 67 °F	9.5 °C; 49 °F	603.6 mm 23.8 in
Suburbs around Kangaroo Inn:
Clay Wells	Clay Wells	Furner
Clay Wells	Kangaroo Inn	Furner
Clay Wells; Thornlea	Thornlea; Furner	Furner
- Footnotes: Locations; Adjoining localities

Kangaroo Inn is a locality in the Australian state of South Australia located in the state's south-east within the Limestone Coast region about 306 kilometres (190 mi) south-east of the state capital of Adelaide, and about 30 kilometres (19 mi) south-east and about 46 kilometres (29 mi) north-west respectively of the municipal seats of Robe and Millicent.

Boundaries for the locality were created for “the long established name” on 18 December 1997.

Kangaroo Inn has a triangular shape due to being bounded by the Princes Highway to the south-west, the Clay Wells Road (also known as Beachport-Penola Road) to the north-east and Drain M of the Upper South East Drainage Network on its south-east side.

The land use within the locality is zoned as ‘primary production’. The Kangaroo Inn Area School, a state government school which opened in 1963, is located in the locality’s south-east corner overlooking Clay Wells Road.

Kangaroo Inn is located within the federal division of Barker, the state electoral district of MacKillop and the local government areas of the District Council of Robe and the Wattle Range Council.
