= Woakwine =

Woakwine may refer to the following:

- Woakwine, the original name proposal for the locality of Magarey, South Australia
- Woakwine Conservation Park, a protected area in South Australia
  - Woakwine Conservation Reserve, the previous name for the Woakwine Conservation Park
- Woakwine Range, a range of hills in South Australia

== See also ==
- Mount Woakwine, the original name proposal for the town of Mount Hope, South Australia
- Woakwine Range Wind Farm, a proposed facility to be built on the Woakwine Range
