= Woakwine Range =

Low range of hills in South Australia

- Location within South Australia

Highest point
- Coordinates: 37.42°S 140.07°E

Geography
- Location: Limestone Coast, South Australia

The Woakwine Range is a low range of hills parallel to the coast in the southeast of South Australia. It extends from the coast at Cape Jaffa southeast to the Kongorong area.

The Woakwine range consists of calcrete beach and dune deposits from the Pleistocene Epoch.

The Woakwine Conservation Park is near the northwestern end of the range, east of Robe.

The Woakwine Range blocked natural rainfall from draining to the coast, resulting in swamp and marshland inland of the range, which drained very slowly. In the first part of the 20th century, farmers desired to drain the swamps to increase the available farmland. The Woakwine Cutting was created in 1957 as a drainage cut through the range, draining into Lake George near Beachport.

The Lake Bonney Wind Farm and Canunda Wind Farm are on the ridge of the Woakwine Range in the vicinity of Tantanoola and Millicent. Infigen Energy, the owner of Lake Bonney Wind Farm proposes to build the Woakwine Range Wind Farm continuing on from its current footprint.
