= Thornlea, South Australia =

Thornlea
- Suburb
- Coordinates: 37°25′21″S 140°11′04″E
- Country: Australia
- State: South Australia
- Region: Limestone Coast
- LGA: Wattle Range Council
- Location: 309 km (192 mi) SE of Adelaide; 25 km (16 mi) NW of Millicent
- Established: 18 December 1997

Government
  - State electorate: MacKillop
  - Federal division: Barker

Population
  - Total: 46 (SAL 2021)
- Time zone: UTC+9:30 (ACST)
  - Summer (DST): UTC+10:30 (ACST)
- Postcode: 5280
- County: Grey
- Mean max temp: 19.6 °C (67.3 °F)
- Mean min temp: 9.5 °C (49.1 °F)
- Annual rainfall: 603.6 mm (23.76 in)
Suburbs around Thornlea
Clay Wells	Clay Wells; Kangaroo Inn	Kangaroo Inn; Furner
Magarey	Thornlea	Furner; Hatherleigh
Rendelsham	Rendelsham	Hatherleigh
- Locations; Adjoining localities

Thornlea is a locality in the Australian state of South Australia located in the state's south-east within the Limestone Coast region about 309 kilometres (192 mi) south east of the state capital of Adelaide and about 25 kilometres (16 mi) north-west of the municipal seat of Millicent.

Boundaries for the locality were created on 18 December 1997.

The land use in the locality is ‘primary production’. A protected area known as the Belt Hill Conservation Park is located in the locality's south-east corner on the boundary with Hatherleigh.

Thornlea is located within the federal division of Barker, the state electoral district of MacKillop and the local government area of the Wattle Range Council.
