= Canunda, South Australia =

Locality in South Australia

Canunda
- Suburb
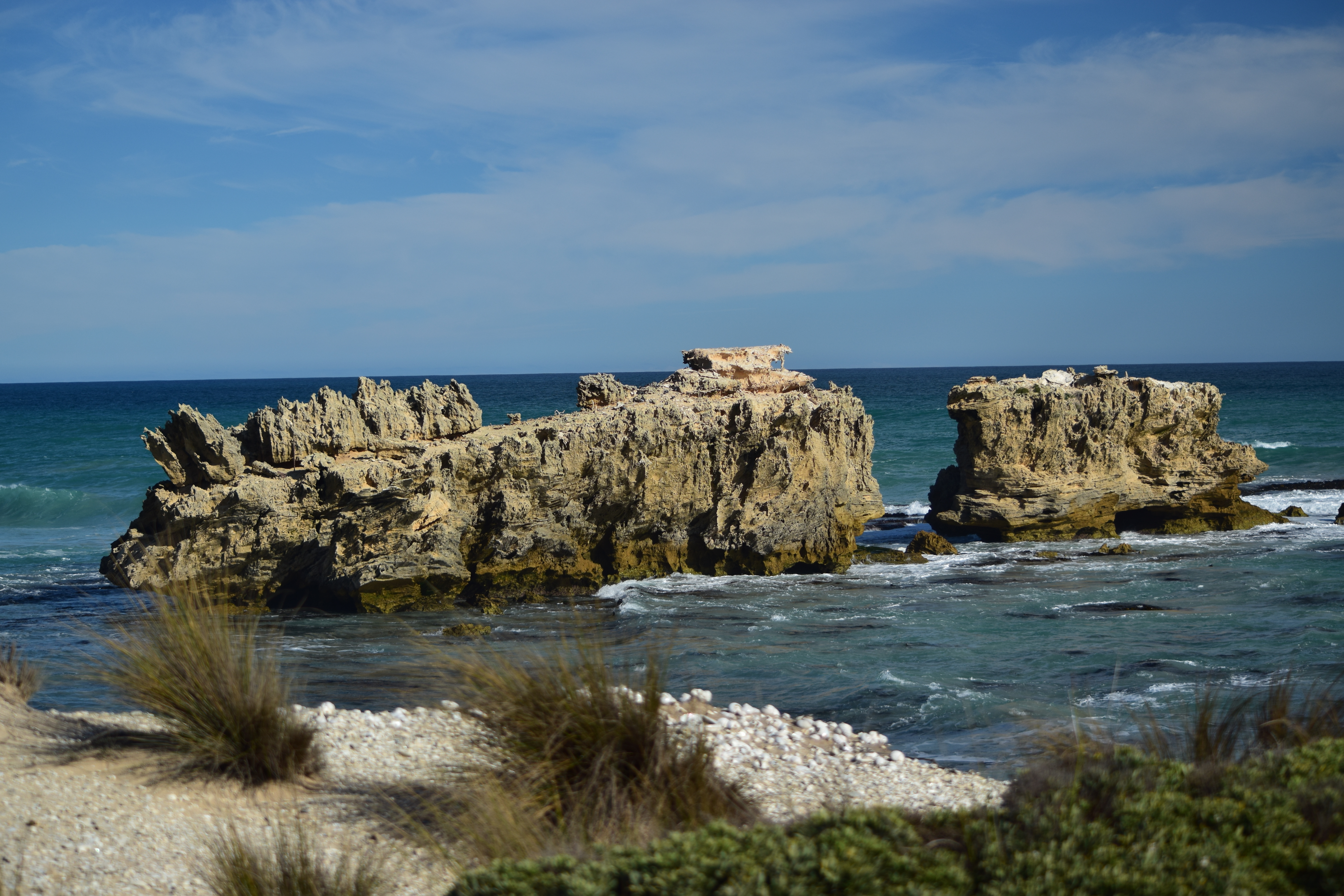
- Mounce and Battye Rocks, Canunda

- Coordinates: 37°40′21″S 140°17′09″E
- Country: Australia
- State: South Australia
- Region: Limestone Coast
- LGA(s): District Council of Grant Wattle Range Council
- Location: 339 km (211 mi) south-east of Adelaide; 49 km (30 mi) west of Mount Gambier; 10 km (6.2 mi) west of Millicent
- Established: 23 February 1995

Government
  - State electorate(s): MacKillop Mount Gambier
  - Federal division(s): Barker

Population
  - Total(s): 21 (SAL 2021)
- Time zone: UTC+9:30 (ACST)
  - Summer (DST): UTC+10:30 (ACST)
- Postcode: 5291
- County: Grey
- Mean max temp: 19.0 °C (66.2 °F)
- Mean min temp: 8.2 °C (46.8 °F)
- Annual rainfall: 708.4 mm (27.89 in)
Suburbs around Canunda
Ocean	Southend; Rendelsham	Rendelsham
Ocean	Canunda	Millicent; Tantanoola; German Flat
Ocean	Carpenter Rocks	Carpenter Rocks
- Locations; Adjoining localities

Canunda is a locality in the Australian state of South Australia located on the state’s south-east coast overlooking the body of water known in Australia as the Southern Ocean and by international authorities as the Great Australian Bight. It is about 339 kilometres (211 miles) south-east of the state capital of Adelaide and 49 kilometres (30 miles) south of the centre of Mount Gambier.

Boundaries were created in February 1995 for the “long established name” which is reported as being derived from the “Canunda Conservation Park”.

Canunda consists of land along the coastline extending from south of the town centre of Southend in the north to just before the headland of Cape Banks in the south and the land between the coast and Woakwine Range in the east including the entirety of Lake Bonney SE.

The land use within the locality consists of agriculture and conservation with latter being associated with land adjoining the coastline which includes the protected area known as the Canunda National Park.

The historic Lake Bonney Woolwash and Fellmongery Sites straddle the boundary of Canunda and the adjoining locality of Millicent.

Canunda is located within the federal division of Barker, the state electoral districts of MacKillop and Mount Gambier and the local government areas of the District Council of Grant and the Wattle Range Council.
