= Southend, South Australia =

Southend South Australia
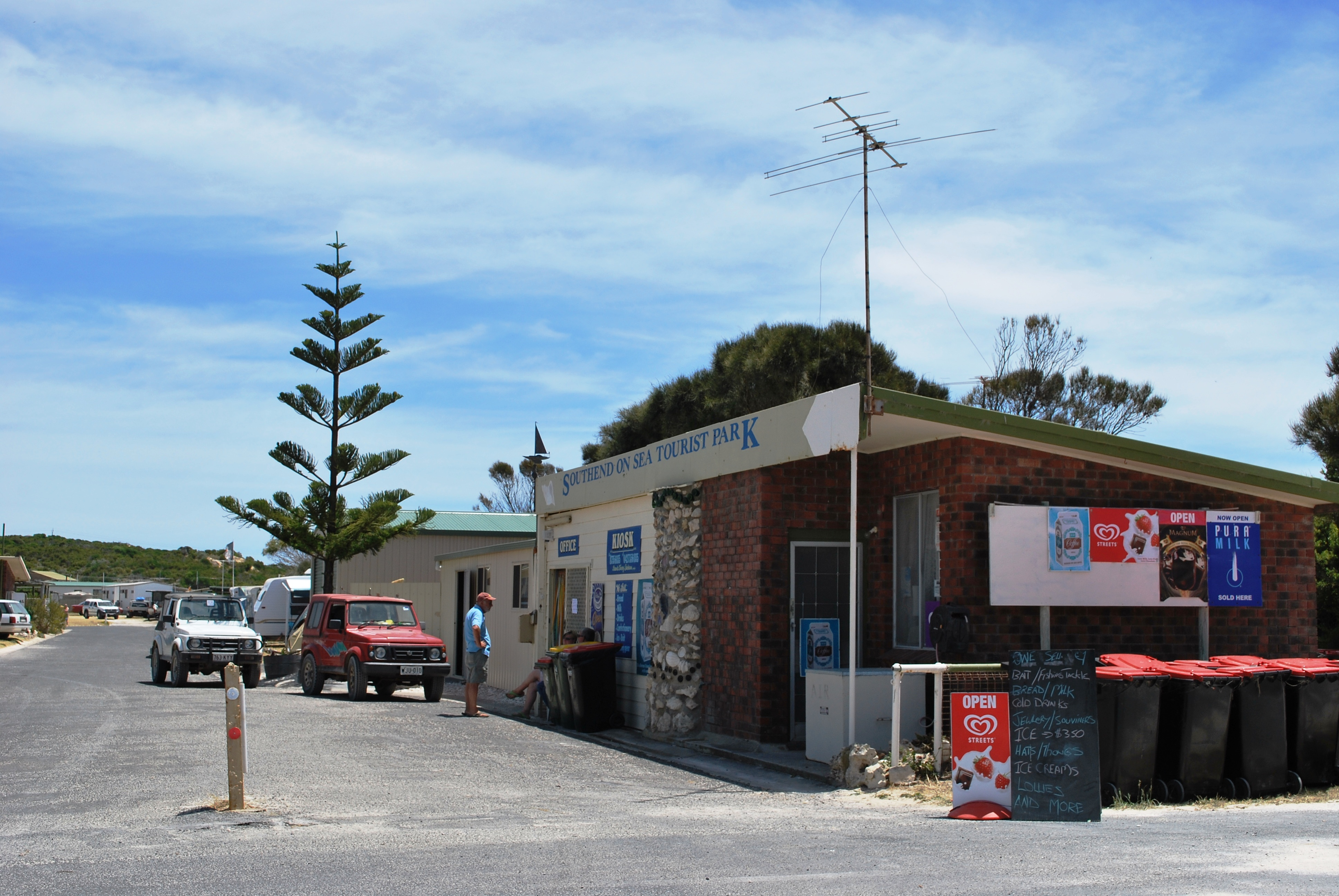
- Caravan park

- Coordinates: 37°34′16″S 140°07′37″E
- Population: 292 (UCL 2021)
- Established: 19 March 1846 (town); 23 February 1995 (locality)
- Postcode(s): 5280
- Time zone: ACST (UTC+9:30)
  - Summer (DST): ACST (UTC+10:30)
- Location: 324 km (201 mi) SE of Adelaide
- LGA(s): Wattle Range Council
- Region: Limestone Coast
- County: Grey
- State electorate(s): MacKillop
- Federal division(s): Barker
Mean max temp	Mean min temp	Annual rainfall
19.7 °C; 67 °F	9.6 °C; 49 °F	608.2 mm 23.9 in
Localities around Southend:
Beachport	Beachport; Rendelsham	Rendelsham
Rivoli Bay	Southend	Rendelsham
Rivoli Bay	Canunda	Canunda
- Footnotes: Adjoining localities

Southend (formerly known as Grey Town and Grey) is a town and locality in the Australian state of South Australia located in the south-east of the state on the southern shore of Rivoli Bay about 324 kilometres (201 mi) south-east of the state capital of Adelaide.

The site of the town was selected by George Grey, Governor of South Australia before his departure in late 1845 and was approved by his successor, Frederick Robe, on 19 March 1846 with the town being laid out by Thomas Burr, the Deputy Surveyor-General later in 1846. The town was originally named Grey Town which changed to Grey in 1912 and then to Southend on 21 October 1971.

Boundaries for the locality were created on 23 February 1995 for the portion within the local government area of the District Council of Millicent within the portion within the District Council of Beachport being created on 18 December 1997. The boundaries include land extending from the coastline of the south-eastern end of Rivoli Bay in the west to the Southern Ports Highway in the north and to Lake Frome in the east including the government town of Southend and the former Southend Shack Site.

The Southend Caravan Park is in very close proximity to the white beaches of Rivoli Bay. The Bluff, less than a five-minute drive from Southend, is a popular scenic destination for locals and tourists. The Rivoli Bay Sailing Club sails catamarans and monohulls, and is located at the end of Leake Street. The club sails from October to April on weekends.

The locality includes the following protected areas – Canunda National Park which occupies land in its south including the coastline up to Cape Buffon and Lake Frome Conservation Park which overlaps most of Lake Frome.

Southend is located within the federal division of Barker, the state electoral district of MacKillop and the local government area of the Wattle Range Council.
