= Greenways, South Australia =

Greenways
- Town
- Coordinates: 37°12′17″S 140°09′41″E
- Country: Australia
- State: South Australia
- Region: Limestone Coast
- LGA: District Council of Robe
- Location: 355 km (221 mi) SE of Adelaide; 46 km (29 mi) east of Robe; 100 km (62 mi) NW of Mount Gambier
- Established: 2 August 1956 (town); 28 January 1999 (locality)

Government
  - State electorate: MacKillop
  - Federal division: Barker

Population
  - Total: 35 (2021 census)
- Postcode: 5272
- County: Robe
Localities around Greenways
Reedy Creek	Conmurra	Conmurra
Bray	Greenways	Conmurra; Fox
Bray	Clay Wells	Clay Wells
- Locations; Adjoining localities

Greenways is a town and a locality in the Australian state of South Australia located in the state's south-east within the Limestone Coast region about 355 kilometres (221 mi) south east of the state capital of Adelaide and about 46 kilometres (29 mi) east of the municipal seat of Robe.

The 2021 Australian census which was conducted in August 2021 reports that Greenways had a population of 35 people.

Greenways is located within the federal division of Barker, the state electoral district of MacKillop and the local government area of the District Council of Robe.
