= Magarey, South Australia =

Magarey South Australia
- Coordinates: 37°24′33″S 140°04′48″E
- Established: 18 December 1997
- Postcode(s): 5208
- Time zone: ACST (UTC+9:30)
  - Summer (DST): ACST (UTC+10:30)
- Location: 307 km (191 mi) SE of Adelaide; 35 km (22 mi) W of Millicent
- LGA(s): Wattle Range Council
- Region: Limestone Coast
- County: Grey
- State electorate(s): MacKillop
- Federal division(s): Barker
Mean max temp	Mean min temp	Annual rainfall
19.6 °C; 67 °F	9.6 °C; 49 °F	608.5 mm 24 in
Suburbs around Magarey:
Bray; Beachport	Bray; Clay Wells	Clay Wells
Beachport	Magarey	Clay Wells; Thornlea
Beachport	Beachport; Rendelsham	Thornlea; Rendelsham
- Footnotes: Locations; Adjoining localities

Magarey is a locality in the Australian state of South Australia located in the state's south-east about 307 kilometres (191 mi) south-east of the state capital of Adelaide and about 35 kilometres (22 mi) west of the municipal seat in Millicent.

Magarey's boundaries were created on 18 December 1997. It was originally proposed to be named as Woakwine, but objections from local residents resulted in Margarey being approved as the locality's name.

Land use within Magarey is zoned for primary production.

Magarey is located within the federal division of Barker, the state electoral district of MacKillop and the local government area of the Wattle Range Council.
