= James Cock =

Australian politician

James Cock (31 August 1833 (Note: Cock's parliamentary biography lists his birth date as 31 August 1883, while his obituary lists it as 21 August 1883.) – 25 November 1901) was a politician in colonial South Australia.

Cock was born in Fifeshire, Scotland, and was the youngest son of Robert Cock, whose family emigrated to South Australia on HMS Buffalo, one of the First Fleet of South Australia, under Captain Hindmarsh.

His father was a land agent and auctioneer, led the first exploration party from Adelaide to Lake Alexandrina in 1837, crossing the creek which was named for him (now named Cox Creek). He was also the first white man to set foot on the site of Whyalla In 1838 Robert Cock sold much of his business to John Bentham Neales. He operated a farm in Magill with William Ferguson (who did the practical work), then ran farms at Oakbank around 1840, which he named "Mount Annan", and Balhannah. He moved to Victoria with the gold rush, settled for a time in Portland and finally in 1853 moved to Mount Gambier, where he ran a brewery.

James was educated at McGowan's school at North Adelaide, and with his brother John accompanied his father to the Victorian goldfields, then with his parents to Mount Gambier. After marriage he lived at Suttontown, then purchased a valuable farm "Sunny Brae" at Torrensdale, later occupied by John P. Kennedy. He also had a carrying business, and with his brother John got the contract to construct part of the telegraph line from Mount Gambier to Adelaide. In 1864 he left for Bowen, Queensland, where he carried on business for about three years, then returned to "The Mount", and resumed farming, also working with his brother John as a contractor. He took up a large area of land in the Millicent area, but he lost much of his cattle and sheep to disease and was forced to relinquish the property. He then went into business as an agent and produce merchant in Mount Gambier.

James Cock was a councillor of Mount Gambier West for two terms, and was an active member of the Agricultural and Horticultural Society. In every capacity be displayed the highest integrity, and was esteemed and trusted by everyone in the district. He was a prominent member of the Mount Gambier Wesleyan Methodist church, and for nearly 40 years a lay preacher. Despite his father's brewery interests, he was a leader of the temperance movement and a total abstainer for 46 years. He joined the Independent Order of Rechabites around 1865. He was appointed justice of the peace.

He stood for election to the South Australian House of Assembly seat of Victoria at the by-election of October 1888 brought about by the death of the Daniel Livingston, but was unsuccessful. He stood again at the next general election and was successful, and served from April 1890. Towards the end of his third term his health gave way, and he was forced to apply for an extended leave of absence, and retired when Parliament expired in April 1899. His colleagues during his parliamentary career were John Osman, George Riddoch and James Toulmin Morris.

He died after several years of poor health and a series of strokes which prevented him leaving his home for several months, and was mostly confined to bed.

== Family ==
James Cock was the son of Robert Cock and his second wife, Catherine née Christie (23 March 1807 – 18 Apr 1870), who married on 28 May 1832 in Abdie, Fife, Scotland;

Robert and Catherine emigrated to South Australia in 1836 on HMS Buffalo with the children of both wives.

James Cock (1833–1901) married Magdalene Williams (1842 – 24 July 1923) on 4 October 1861

- Anne Cock (1862– ) married William Henry Collins ( – ) on 6 January 1886, lived at Mount Gambier
- Mary Cock (c. 1865 – 27 July 1899) married W. H. Kilsby ( – ) lived at Mount Gambier
- Catherine Cock (1867–) married Alfred Ernest Tozer ( – ) of Port Wakefield on 3 October 1900; they lived at Scott Creek
- Jane Rosetta "Jean" Cock (1869 – 14 September 1936)
- Magdalene Cock (1872–1949) married George Arthur Hill in 1904
- Andrew Owen Cock (1875 – 25 December 1913) married M. A. Pope on 6 May 1903, died in Broken Hill
- David Gambier Cock (1881– ) married Amy in 1911, lived in Mount Barker

His grandfather, also named Robert Cock (c. 1776 – 16 December 1839) arrived in South Australia on the Catherine Jamieson in December 1838.

William Owen was his uncle; William and Christian née Cock arrived with her uncles Alexander and James Cock in November 1838 on the Rajasthan, chartered by his father.
