= Furner, South Australia =

Furner
- Town
- Coordinates: 37°24′33″S 140°20′19″E
- Country: Australia
- State: South Australia
- Region: Limestone Coast
- LGA: Wattle Range Council
- Location: 27 km (17 mi) N of Millicent
- Established: 11 November 1886 (town); 23 February 1995 (locality)

Government
  - State electorate: MacKillop
  - Federal division: Barker

Population
  - Total: 156 (SAL 2021)
- Postcode: 5280
- County: Grey
- Mean max temp: 20.5 °C (68.9 °F)
- Mean min temp: 8.1 °C (46.6 °F)
- Annual rainfall: 568.7 mm (22.39 in)
Localities around Furner
Fox	Fox	Coles
Clay Wells; Kangaroo Inn; Thornlea	Furner	Short; Wattle Range; Mount Burr
Thornlea	Sebastopol; Hatherleigh	Mount Burr

Furner is a town and locality in the Australian state of South Australia. Furner is a farming community.

Furner is located within the federal division of Barker, the state electoral district of Mackillop and the local government area of the Wattle Range Council.
