= Belt Hill Conservation Park =

Protected area in South Australia

- IUCN category III (natural monument or feature)
- Location within South Australia
- Location: South Australia
- Nearest city: Hatherleigh
- Coordinates: 37°28′00″S 140°14′30″E
- Area: 10 ha (25 acres)
- Established: 27 April 1972
- Governing body: Department for Environment and Water

Belt Hill Conservation Park is a protected area located in the Australian state of South Australia in the locality of Thornlea about 317 kilometres (197 mi) south-east of the state capital of Adelaide and about 4 kilometres (2.5 mi) north west of the town centre in Hatherleigh.

The conservation park occupies land in section 339 of the cadastral unit of the Hundred of Rivoli Bay. In 1971, the land was offered by its owner, A. McArthur of Rendelsham, to the "then National Parks Commission" for "dedication as a Reserve". On 27 April 1972, it was proclaimed as the Belt Hill Conservation Park when the National Parks and Wildlife Act 1972 came into force. As of 2016, it covered an area of 10 hectares (25 acres).

In 1990, the conservation park was described as consisting of "a consolidated calcarenite dune overlain by weakly-structured sandy soils" that "extends from the east" with a "swale or low-lying plainwhich continues into adjacent farmland" on its western side. The vegetation cover was described as consisting of "an open scrub formation" of silver-leaved banksia, blackwood, and golden wattle" on the dune with "mainly introduced pasture grasses with some kangaroo grass… and knobby club-rush… covering the swale in the west. It was reported that native vegetation within the conservation park "has been considerably disturbed mainly through grazing by stock and rabbits" and during the early 1950s, a "row of pine trees was planted on the southern boundary to control sand drift".

In 1990, it was reported that two archaeological sites are located on the dune as evident by a "thin scatter of artefacts" on its surface. It is speculated that "the area supported a substantial Aboriginal population as it is elevated, well sheltered and watered, and would have offered many sources of food." Also, there was an abandoned stone quarry on the southern side of the conservation park and a sand pit in its north from which material was extracted for road construction by state government agencies.

The conservation park is classified as an IUCN Category III protected area.

== See also ==
- Protected areas of South Australia
