= Lake Hawdon South Conservation Park =

Protected area in South Australia

- IUCN category VI (protected area with sustainable use of natural resources)
- Location within South Australia
- Location: South Australia, Bray
- Nearest city: Robe
- Coordinates: 37°13′13″S 139°56′40″E
- Area: 31.85 km^{2} (12.30 sq mi)
- Established: 18 February 2010
- Governing body: Department for Environment and Water

Lake Hawdon South Conservation Park is a protected area located in the Australian state of South Australia in the locality of Bray about 280 kilometres (170 mi) south-east of the state capital of Adelaide and about 18 kilometres (11 mi) east of the town of Robe.

The conservation park consists of crown land in Sections 177 and 178 of the cadastral unit of the Hundred of Bray. It came into existence on 18 February 2010 by proclamation under the National Parks and Wildlife Act 1972. On the same day, a separate proclamation ensured that “certain existing and future rights of entry, prospecting, exploration or mining” permitted under the state's Petroleum and Geothermal Energy Act 2000 would apply to the extent of the conservation park. As of 2016, it covered an area of 31.85 square kilometres (12.30 sq mi).

The conservation park's boundaries align with the extent of the water body known as Lake Hawdon South which was described in 2010 as a “shallow, seasonally inundated lake”, as having an area of about 31.9 square kilometres (12.3 sq mi) and which is the southern basin of a larger system known as Lake Hawdon. The lake contains extensive areas of sedgelands including species such as Gahnia trifida, Gahnia filum, Baumea arthrophylla, Baumea juncea and Juncus kraussii.

In 2010, the conservation park's conservation significance was described as follows:

1. It supports biota of conservation significance including “17 vertebrate fauna species, seven plant species and three plant communities.”
2. Two plant communities are considered vulnerable at a state and regional level, being the “Baumea juncea / B. arthrophylla sedgeland on the western side of the lake and Gahnia filum / G. trifida sedgeland.”
3. It contains a field of microbial accretionary structures known as thrombolites which cover an area of 3.20 square kilometres (1.24 sq mi).
4. It contains about 100 native fauna species including the western grey kangaroo, wombat and bush rat, eight amphibian species and 15 reptile species including the state endangered glossy grass skink.

The conservation park is classified as an IUCN Category VI protected area.

== See also ==
- Protected areas of South Australia
- Lake Hawdon System Important Bird Area
