= Beachport Conservation Park =

Protected area in South Australia

- IUCN category VI (protected area with sustainable use of natural resources)
- Location within South Australia
- Location: South Australia
- Nearest city: Beachport
- Coordinates: 37°27′12″S 139°58′36″E
- Area: 8.75 km^{2} (3.38 sq mi)
- Established: 1 January 1959
- Governing body: Department for Environment and Water
- Website: http://www.environment.sa.gov.au/parks/Find_a_Park/Browse_by_region/Limestone_Coast/Beachport_Conservation_Park

Beachport Conservation Park, formerly the Beachport National Park, is a protected area located in the Limestone Coast of South Australia about 80 kilometres (50 miles) north-west of Mount Gambier and immediately north of the township of Beachport.

Land in the conservation park first acquired protected area status as a reserve created in 1959. Land in Sections 5, 31, 32, 40 and 58 of the cadastral unit of the Hundred of Lake George was proclaimed as the Beachport National Park on 19 September 1968 under the National Parks Act 1966. On 25 September 1969, the national park was proclaimed as a historic reserve under the Aboriginal and Historic Relics Act 1965. On 27 April 1972, the national park was reconstituted as the Beachport Conservation Park under the National Parks and Wildlife Act 1972.

The conservation park is classified as an IUCN Category VI protected area. In 1980, it was listed on the now-defunct Register of the National Estate.

== See also ==
- Lake Hawdon System Important Bird Area
