= Bray, South Australia =

Bray
- Town
- Coordinates: 37°16′46″S 139°58′06″E
- Country: Australia
- State: South Australia
- Region: Limestone Coast
- LGAs: District Council of Robe; Wattle Range Council
- Location: 359 km (223 mi) SE of Adelaide; 25 km (16 mi) SE of Robe

Government
  - State electorate: MacKillop
  - Federal division: Barker

Population
  - Total: 44 (SAL 2021)
- Time zone: UTC+9:30 (ACST)
  - Summer (DST): UTC+10:30 (ACST)
- County: Robe
- Mean max temp: 19.6 °C (67.3 °F)
- Mean min temp: 9.6 °C (49.3 °F)
- Annual rainfall: 608.5 mm (23.96 in)
Localities around Bray
Robe	Mount Benson; Reedy Creek	Conmurra
Robe; Nora Creina; Beachport	Bray	Greenways; Clay Wells
Beachport	Beachport; Magarey	Magarey

Bray is a locality in South Australia, roughly contiguous with the land administration division, the Hundred of Bray, after which it was named. It is located within the federal division of Barker, the state electoral district of MacKillop and the local government areas of the District Council of Robe and the Wattle Range Council.

== See also ==
- List of cities and towns in South Australia
- Lake Hawdon South Conservation Park
