= Alwyn Davies (footballer) =

Australian rules footballer

Personal information
- Full name: Alwyn John Davies
- Born: 19 March 1896; Beachport, South Australia
- Died: 4 May 1949 (aged 53); Moonee Ponds, Victoria

Playing career^{1}
Years	Club	Games (Goals)
1919	St Kilda	2 (0)
- ^{1} Playing statistics correct to the end of 1919.

Alwyn John Davies (19 March 1896 – 4 May 1949) was an Australian rules footballer who played for the St Kilda Football Club in the Victorian Football League (VFL).
