= Lake Hawdon =

Lake Hawdon may refer to the following:

- Lake Hawdon (New Zealand), a lake in New Zealand
- Lake Hawdon (South Australia), a lake in the south east of South Australia
  - Lake Hawdon System Important Bird Area, a designation in South Australia associated with Lake Hawdon and other nearby lakes
  - Lake Hawdon South Conservation Park, a protected area in South Australia associated with part of Lake Hawdon

== See also ==
- Joseph Hawdon
