= Fox, South Australia =

Fox
- Suburb
- Coordinates: 37°13′10″S 140°20′08″E
- Country: Australia
- State: South Australia
- Region: Limestone Coast
- LGA: Naracoorte Lucindale Council
- Location: 298 km (185 mi) SE of Adelaide; 45 km (28 mi) SW of Naracoorte
- Established: 3 December 1998

Government
  - State electorate: MacKillop
  - Federal division: Barker

Population
  - Total: 49 (SAL 2021)
- Time zone: UTC+9:30 (ACST)
  - Summer (DST): UTC+10:30 (ACST)
- Postcode: 5272
- County: Robe
- Mean max temp: 21.2 °C (70.2 °F)
- Mean min temp: 8.4 °C (47.1 °F)
- Annual rainfall: 603.5 mm (23.76 in)
Suburbs around Fox
Conmurra	Conmurra; Lucindale	Lucindale
Conmurra; Greenways	Fox	Coles
Clay Wells	Clay Wells; Furner	Short
- Locations; Adjoining localities

Fox is a locality in the Australian state of South Australia located in the state's south-east within the Limestone Coast region about 298 kilometres (185 mi) south east of the state capital of Adelaide and about 45 kilometres (28 mi) south-west of the municipal seat of Naracoorte.

Boundaries for the locality were created and was given the name of Fox on 3 December 1998. The name is derived from the cadastral unit of the Hundred of Fox in which the locality is located. The hundred itself was named after Arthur Aloysius Fox who served one term in the South Australian House of Assembly.

Fox is located within the federal division of Barker, the state electoral district of MacKillop and the local government area of the Naracoorte Lucindale Council.

== See also ==
- Fox (disambiguation)
