= Hawdon =

Hawdon is a surname originating in the north of England and may refer to:

== People ==
- Dickie Hawdon (1927–2009), English jazz trumpeter and member of the Yorkshire Jazz Band
- John Hawdon (sculler) (b. 1852), British rower
- John Hawdon (colonial settler) (1801–1881), pioneering settler in Australia, and older brother of Joseph Hawdon
- Joseph Hawdon (1813–1871), pioneering settler in Australia and New Zealand
- Matthias Hawdon (1732–1789), English organist and composer

=== Fiction ===
- Captain Hawdon, a character in Bleak House by Charles Dickens
- Frank Hawdon, a character in the 1979 film My Brilliant Career

== Places ==
- Hawdon River, New Zealand (named for Joseph Hawdon)
- Lake Hawdon (disambiguation), several places in Australia and New Zealand (named for Joseph Hawdon)
