= Conmurra, South Australia =

Conmurra
- Suburb
- Interactive map of Conmurra
- Coordinates: 37°8′3″S 140°10′21″E
- Country: Australia
- State: South Australia
- LGA: Naracoorte Lucindale Council
- Established: 3 December 1998

Government
  - State electorate: MacKillop
  - Federal division: Barker

Population
  - Total: 76 (SAL 2021)
- Postcode: 5271
Suburbs around Conmurra
Reedy Creek	Avenue Range	Lucindale
	Conmurra
Bray	Greenways	Fox

Conmurra is a locality in the Naracoorte Lucindale Council in the Limestone Coast region of South Australia. It is roughly coincident with the western three quarters of the Hundred of Conmurra. The eastern part of the hundred is included in the locality of Lucindale.
