= Arthur Aloysius Fox =

Australian politician

Arthur Aloysius Fox (22 October 1847 – 11 April 1901) was a landowner and politician in the colony of South Australia.

He was the only son of Rundle Street auctioneer Arthur Fox (c. 1814 – 1 May 1853) and his wife Frances Ellen Fox née Nihill (c. 1826 – 25 May 1895), who established the property "Marybank" near Athelstone (also mentioned in connection with Hectorville), profited handsomely from shares in the Kapunda and Burra copper mines, and died from accidental drowning. Frances Ellen's sister Mary Nihill (c. 1811–1893) married Daniel Michael Paul Cudmore (1811–1891) around 1835.

He was Secretary of the Athelstone Institute, and prominent in organising the erection of the Institute building. He was a man of some means, and owned property adjacent to the town of Mintaro

He was elected as a Protectionist candidate (and received much support from fellow Catholics) to the seat of West Adelaide in the South Australian House of Assembly and sat from April 1884 to March 1887, with C. C. Kingston as his colleague. He was unsuccessful at the following election. He was appointed Justice of the Peace around 1885, but seldom sat on the Bench.

He married Winifred Phillips of "Redlands", St. Leonards, New South Wales, on 31 May 1893. Winifred was a friend of Sister Mary MacKillop.

He died at his residence, "Marybank", and was buried in the Catholic section of the West Terrace Cemetery.

== Family ==
Arthur Fox, Sr. (c. 1814 – 1 May 1853) was married to Frances Ellen "Fanny" Fox, née Nihill, (c. 1826 – 25 May 1895); their children included:

- Arthur Aloysius Fox (22 October 1847 – 11 April 1901) married Winifred Anne Phillips (c. 1861 – 8 January 1950) on 31 May 1893

- (Arthur) Gerard Fox (26 December 1894 – ) with First Australian Imperial Force in Gallipoli and Pozières; POW in Germany. Married in 1919.
- (Helen) Dymphna Fox (13 June 1896 – 1964) married Cyril Thomas McKenna ( –1980) on 24 December 1922. She divorced him in 1951.

- eldest daughter Mary Dymphna Fox (c. 1852 – 11 October 1892) married Richard John Rigaud ( – 26 March 1906) on 25 May 1868
- second daughter Sarah Theresa Fox (c. 1851 – 16 July 1939) married Francis Joseph Makinson on 19 September 1876
- youngest daughter Margaret Frances Christina Fox (c. 1857 – 1927) married T. Henry Massey Makinson (23 February 1840 – 22 May 1913) on 14 February 1878.

== See also ==
- Hundred of Fox
