= Rendelsham, South Australia =

Rendelsham
- Town
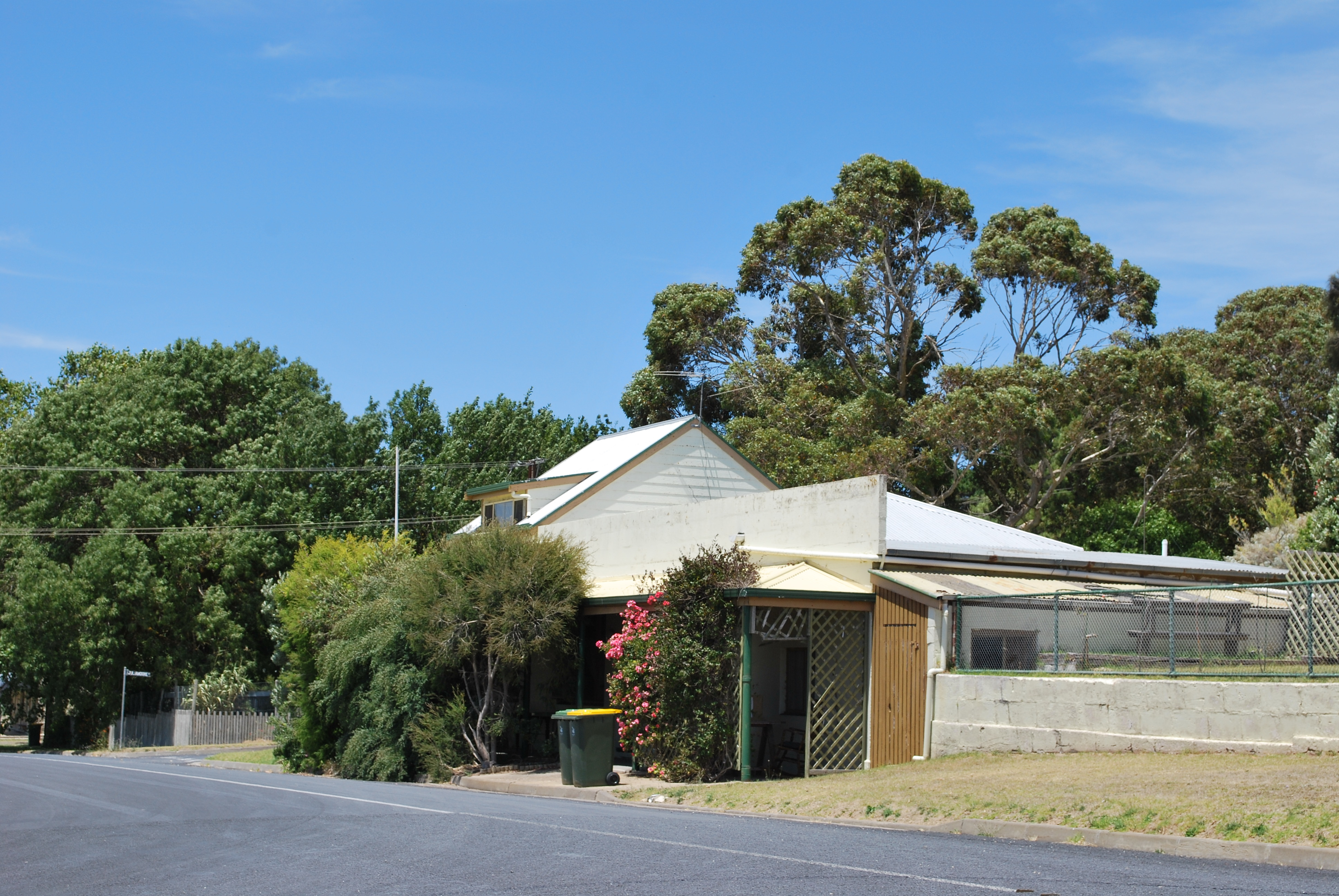
- House at Rendelsham

- Coordinates: 37°32′59″S 140°13′28″E
- Country: Australia
- State: South Australia
- Region: Limestone Coast
- LGA: Wattle Range Council
- Location: 392 km (244 mi) SE of Adelaide; 63 km (39 mi) NW of Mount Gambier; 13 km (8.1 mi) NW of Millicent
- Established: 22 January 1880 (town); 23 February 1995 (locality)

Government
  - State electorate: MacKillop
  - Federal division: Barker
- Elevation (railway station): 16 m (52 ft)

Population
  - Total: 229 (SAL 2021)
- Time zone: UTC+9:30 (ACST)
  - Summer (DST): UTC+10:30 (ACST)
- Postcode: 5280
- County: Grey
Localities around Rendelsham
Beachport; Magarey	Thornlea	Hatherleigh
Southend	Rendelsham
	Canunda	Millicent

Rendelsham is a town in the south-east of South Australia, 392 kilometres (244 mi) south east of the state capital, Adelaide. It is on the Southern Ports Highway between Beachport and Millicent.

Rendelsham was also located on the narrow-gauge railway between Beachport and Mount Gambier from its opening in 1878 until 1957. When part of the line was converted to broad gauge, the section from Millicent to Beachport was decommissioned instead of being converted, removing railway services from Rendelsham.

Rendelsham is located within the federal division of Barker, the state Electoral district of MacKillop and the local government area of the Wattle Range Council.
