= Little Dip Conservation Park =

Protected area in South Australia

- IUCN category VI (protected area with sustainable use of natural resources)
- Location within South Australia
- Location: South Australia
- Nearest city: Robe
- Coordinates: 37°14′7″S 139°47′36″E
- Area: 21.5 km^{2} (8.3 sq mi)
- Established: 21 August 1975
- Governing body: Department for Environment and Water
- Website: Official website

Little Dip Conservation Park is a protected area in the Australian state of South Australia located in the Limestone Coast about 105 kilometres (65 miles) north-west of Mount Gambier and about 5 kilometres (3.1 miles) south of the town of Robe. It was proclaimed as a conservation park under the National Parks and Wildlife Act 1972 in 1975 for the purpose of conserving "remnant vegetation and a chain of small lakes which combine to provide habitat for several endangered and vulnerable bird species" and managing "the increasing use" of the locality "for recreation purposes". The conservation park is classified as an IUCN Category VI protected area.

== See also ==
- Lake Hawdon System Important Bird Area
