= Hatherleigh, South Australia =

Hatherleigh South Australia
- Coordinates: 37°29′32″S 140°16′23″E
- Population: 154 (SAL 2021)
- Established: 20 November 1879 (town); 23 February 1995 (locality)
- Postcode(s): 5280
- Time zone: ACST (UTC+9:30)
  - Summer (DST): ACST (UTC+10:30)
- Location: 322 km (200 mi) SE of Adelaide; 15 km (9 mi) NW of Millicent
- LGA(s): Wattle Range Council
- Region: Limestone Coast
- State electorate(s): Mackillop
- Federal division(s): Barker
Localities around Hatherleigh:
Thornlea	Furner	Furner
Thornlea; Rendelsham	Hatherleigh	Furner; Sebastopol
Rendelsham	Rendelsham; Sebastopol	Sebastopol
- Footnotes: Adjoining localities

Hatherleigh is a locality in the Australian state of South Australia located in the state's Limestone Coast region about 322 kilometres (200 mi) south-east of the state capital of Adelaide and about 15 kilometres (9.3 mi) north-west of the municipal seat in Millicent.

Hatherleigh is located within the federal Division of Barker and the state Electoral district of Mackillop, and within the local government area of the Wattle Range Council.
