= Mayura Station =

Coordinates: 37.6297°S 140.2939°E

Mayura Station (a.k.a. Mayurra) is a cattle station in South Australia.

It is a historically important location in South Australia, being one of the earliest pastoralist operations and European settlements in what was to become that state. It is located nearby the town of Millicent, a town built upon land contained within the station in its early days of operation.

In modern times, the station is highly regarded as a producer of high-quality beef. It began stocking full-blood Wagyu cattle in 1997.

== History ==
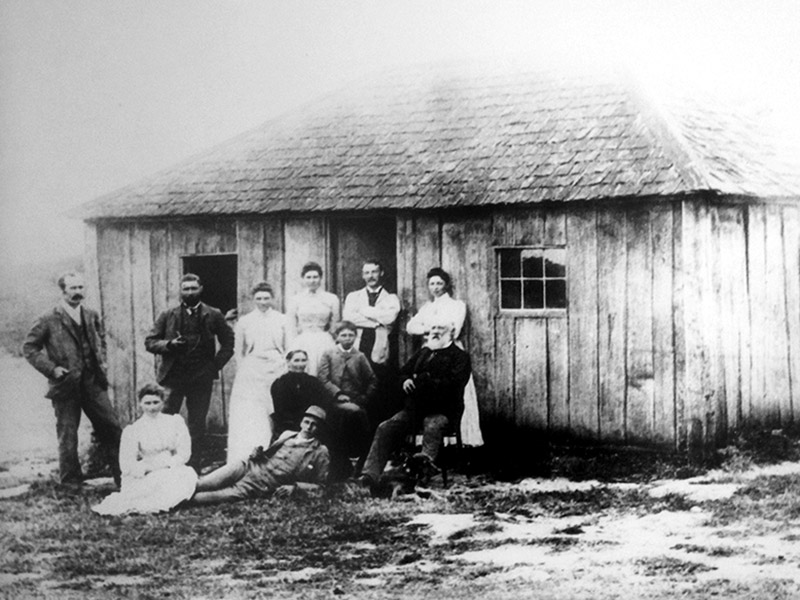
An early photo of Mayura Station

Mayura is one of Australia's oldest pastoral operations, having been established in 1845.

The station's history is associated with the early European settlement of South Australia's south east, and with the early settlers George Glen and Samuel Davenport.

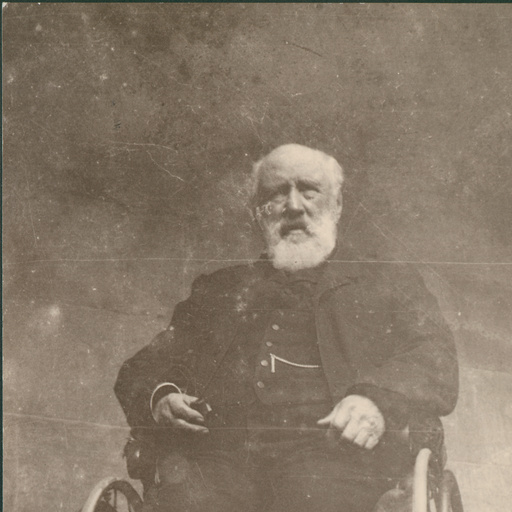
George Glen seated in a wheelchair

Samuel Davenport established the station, which initially raised sheep. The station was later run by George Glen, it also later became the site of the future town of Millicent. The town was named for his wife, Millicent Glen (née Short).

== See also ==
- Agriculture in Australia
