= Woakwine Conservation Park =

Protected area in South Australia

- IUCN category VI (protected area with sustainable use of natural resources)
- Location within South Australia
- Location: South Australia
- Nearest city: Robe
- Coordinates: 37°10′22″S 139°51′49″E
- Area: 4.24 km^{2} (1.64 sq mi)
- Established: 11 November 1993
- Visitors: ‘minimal’ (in 2000)
- Governing body: Department for Environment and Water

Woakwine Conservation Park (formerly the Woakwine Conservation Reserve) is a protected area located in the Australian state of South Australia in the locality of Robe about 272 kilometres (169 mi) south-east of the state capital of Adelaide and about 8 kilometres (5.0 mi) east of the town centre in Robe.

The conservation park consists of land in the cadastral unit of the Hundred of Waterhouse which is described as allotments 3 and 5 of Deposited Plan No. 29451. It was proclaimed on 11 November 1993 as a conservation reserve under the Crown Lands Act 1929 with the name "Woakwine Conservation Reserve". On 16 September 2010, it was reconstituted as the Woakwine Conservation Park under the National Parks and Wildlife Act 1972. As of 2018, it covered an area of 4.24 square kilometres (1.64 sq mi).

The conservation park consists of a "consolidated dune ridge of shallow well-drained uniform sands" supporting a remnant area of mallee woodland typical of what once covered the "almost completely cleared" Woakwine Range. The woodland "varies from coastal mallee, to blue gum, and pink gum woodlands from north to south". The conservation park is divided into two parts by Drain L which drains water from Lake Hawdon North in the north-east to the ocean to the south-west.

In 2000, the conservation park included animal species listed in the state's National Parks and Wildlife Act 1972 as follows:

- Painted buttonquail and rufous bristlebird are listed as vulnerable.
- Red-necked wallaby, common wombat, beautiful firetail and peregrine falcon are listed as rare.

The land was used for agricultural purposes up until the late 1970s and which included the clearing of vegetation and the grazing of stock.

As of 2000, visitation was described as being "minimal" and as follows - "low impact recreational activities, including bushwalking, bird watching and natural history study".

The conservation park is classified as an IUCN Category VI protected area.

== See also ==
- Protected areas of South Australia
