= Lisa Ruffell =

Bendigo politician

Mayor of the District Council of Robe
- Incumbent
- Assumed office 2023
- Preceded by: Alison Nunan

Councillor of the District Council of Robe
- Incumbent
- Assumed office 2022

Mayor of the City of Greater Bendigo
- In office 2012–2013
- Preceded by: Alec Sandner
- Succeeded by: Barry Lyons

Councillor of the City of Greater Bendigo for Whipstick Ward
- In office 2012–2016

Councillor of the City of Greater Bendigo for Epsom Ward
- In office 2008–2012
- Preceded by: Trudi McClure
- Succeeded by: Ward Abolished

Personal details
- Party: Liberal
- Children: 3

Lisa Ruffell is an Australian politician who has served as mayor of the District Council of Robe since 2023 and as mayor of the City of Greater Bendigo from 2012 until 2013. She has served as a councillor for the District Council of Robe since 2022 and was a councilor for the City of Greater Bendigo from 2008 until 2016.

== Political career ==
=== City of Greater Bendigo ===
In the 2002 Victorian state election, Ruffell contested the division Bendigo East but failed to defeat the incumbent Labor member Jacinta Allan. Ruffell won 27.9% of the primary vote and 37.0% of the Two-party-preferred vote.

Ruffell was elected to the City of Greater Bendigo council in the 2008 election in the Epsom Ward, achieving 32.34% of the primary vote and 63.38% of the two candidate preferred vote, defeating incumbent councilor Trudi McClure, also a member of the Liberal Party.

In the 2012 election, Bendigo switched to a multi-member ward system. Ruffell was elected to the Whipstick Ward with 30.02% of the primary vote. In that election, incumbent mayor Alec Sandner lost his seat, leading to Rufell to be elected as mayor by the council.

In 2013, while serving as mayor, Ruffell began a long running dispute between fellow councillors Elise Chapman and Helen Leach. The dispute started in March of that year when the two councillors were alleged to have intervened to prevent a disabled woman from dancing at a disability event, which led to the complaint from the service provider, Amicus. Chapman and Leach raised concerns about how Ruffell handled the council's response. A review by a councillor conduct panel later concluded that Ruffell had denied the pair natural justice in the council's handling of the complaint, however the misconduct finding was later overturned. Ruffell indicated that she would challenge the panel's ruling. The dispute was solved through a Victorian Civil and Administrative Tribunal mediation with Ruffell giving an apology from the council. At a meeting of the council in August 2014, the pair accepted an apology from Ruffell, however, Chapman stated during the meeting that she found her treatment to be "appalling and unfathomable".

Ruffell did not contest the 2016 election.

=== District Council of Robe ===
Ruffel was elected as a councilor to the District Council of Robe in the 2022 election. As Robe failed to receive any nominations for directly elected mayor, Ruffell was elected by the council as deputy mayor. A supplementary election for the position of mayor was held in 2023, with Ruffell winning the position uncontested.

== Personal life ==
In 2013, Ruffell stated that she has lived in Bendigo "for over thirty years", though she was not born in Bendigo. Ruffell has children and grandchildren who were born in Bendigo.
