= Wattle Range Council =

- Local government area
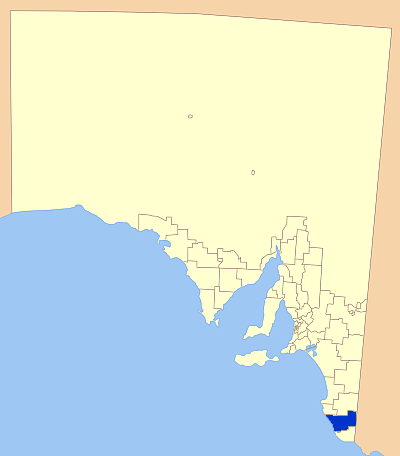
- Position of the Wattle Range Council

- Interactive map of Wattle Range Council
- Coordinates: 37.4653°S 140.4999°E
- Country: Australia
- State: South Australia
- Region: Limestone Coast
- Established: 1997
- Council seat: Millicent

Government
  - Mayor: Des Noll
  - State electorate: MacKillop, Mount Gambier
  - Federal division: Barker

Area
  - Total: 3,923.5 km^{2} (1,514.9 sq mi)

Population
  - Total: 11,888 (LGA 2021)
  - Density: 3.03/km^{2} (7.8/sq mi)
- Website: Wattle Range Council
LGAs around Wattle Range Council
District Council of Robe	Naracoorte Lucindale Council
Southern Ocean	Wattle Range Council	Glenelg (Vic)
Southern Ocean	Southern Limestone Coast Council

Wattle Range Council is a local government area in the Limestone Coast region of South Australia. It stretches from the coast at Beachport east to the Victorian border. It had a population of over 11,000 as at the 2016 Census.

The council is divided into four wards; Kintore, Riddoch, Sorby Adams and Corcoran wards, with two or more councillors representing each ward. The council seat is located at Millicent.

== History ==
The aboriginal people of the region were composed of five powerful tribes, each occupying its own territory which was strictly defined, and territorial rights guarded jealously. Each had different dialects and the names of the tribes were Bungandidj, Pinegunga, Mootatunga, Wichitunga and Polingunga, of which the first was the most powerful. The tract of country occupied by the Booandik extended from the mouth of the Glenelg River to Rivoli Bay North (Beachport) for about 30 miles inland.

European settlers first moved into the area in the late 1840s, and by the 1860s opened up tracts of land for farming cereal crops. Beachport became an important port during the 1880s, further increasing the population of the area. The first local government areas were set up around the three towns of Millicent, Penola and Beachport in the late 19th century, with each operating independently of each other until 1997.

The Wattle Range Council was formed in 1997 from the amalgamation of the District Council of Beachport, the District Council of Millicent and the District Council of Penola.

== Geography ==
The council includes the towns and localities of Beachport, Burrungule, Comaum, Coonawarra, Furner, German Flat, Glencoe, Glenroy, Hatherleigh, Kalangadoo, Kangaroo Inn, Koorine, Krongart, Maaoupe, Magarey, Millicent, Moerlong, Monbulla, Mount Burr, Mount McIntyre, Nangwarry, Penola, Rendelsham, Rocky Camp, Sebastopol, Short, Southend, Thornlea, Wattle Range and Wattle Range East, and parts of Bool Lagoon, Bray, Canunda, Clay Wells, Nora Creina, Tantanoola and Wepar.

== Economy ==
The local economy is dependent on wide range of activities, with agriculture, fishing, forestry and tourism making up the major components.

Sheep and cattle farming are the prominent agricultural venture, with dairy farming common also. Cereal cropping is also prevalent in the nutrient-rich soils of the South East.

Viticulture is well established in the council area, with one of South Australia's premier wine growing regions, the Coonawarra wine region, located in its bounds, with rich terra rossa soil aiding the wine quality.

Forestry and milling have also been important to the district, with processing plants at Nangwarry and Millicent.

Tourism is a diverse, growing aspect of the economy, with seaside towns such as Beachport attracting tourists for the seaside atmosphere, and others such as Coonawarra, for the wine growing industry. A niche tourism activity is cave diving in the water-filled caves and sinkholes present in the southern part of the council's area as well as in the adjoining local government area of the District Council of Grant. This activity attracts cave divers from around the globe. Popular sites include Fossil Cave, Pines and Tank Cave.

== Elected members ==
Ward	Elected Members	Position
N/A	Des Noll	Mayor
Corcoran	Glenn Brown	Deputy Mayor
Corcoran	Sharon Cox	Councillor
Corcoran	John Drew	Councillor
Corcoran	Moira Neagle	Councillor
Corcoran	Graham Slarks	Councillor
Kintore	Peter Dunnicliff	Councillor
Kintore	Kevin McGrath	Councillor
Riddoch	Dean Burrow	Councillor
Riddoch	Rick Paltridge	Councillor
Sorby Adams	Deb Agnew	Councillor
Sorby Adams	Dale Price	Councillor

Wattle Range Council has a directly elected mayor. A councillor is appointed by council as deputy mayor at the start of each term in office.

== See also ==
- List of parks and gardens in rural South Australia
