= James Toulmin Morris =

Australian politician

James Toulmin Morris (25 March 1833 – 2 April 1912) was an Australian politician who represented the South Australian House of Assembly multi-member seat of Victoria from 1896 to 1902.

He was proprietor of the Mount Gambier newspaper, the S. E. Star. Morris Street, Mount Gambier, was named for him.
