= District Council of Robe =

Coordinates: 37.1625°S 139.756°E

- Local government area
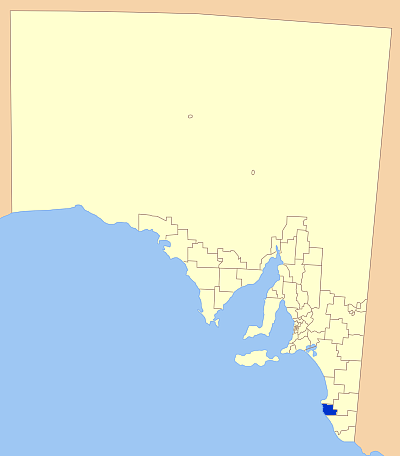
- Location of the District Council of Robe in blue

- Interactive map of District Council of Robe
- Country: Australia
- State: South Australia
- Region: Limestone Coast
- Established: 1869
- Council seat: Robe

Government
  - Mayor: Lisa Ruffell
  - State electorate: MacKillop
  - Federal division: Barker

Area
  - Total: 1,091.1 km^{2} (421.3 sq mi)

Population
  - Total: 1,542 (LGA 2021)
  - Density: 1.41/km^{2} (3.7/sq mi)
- Website: District Council of Robe
LGAs around District Council of Robe
| | Kingston District Council |
| Southern Ocean | District Council of Robe | Naracoorte Lucindale Council |
| Southern Ocean | Wattle Range Council |

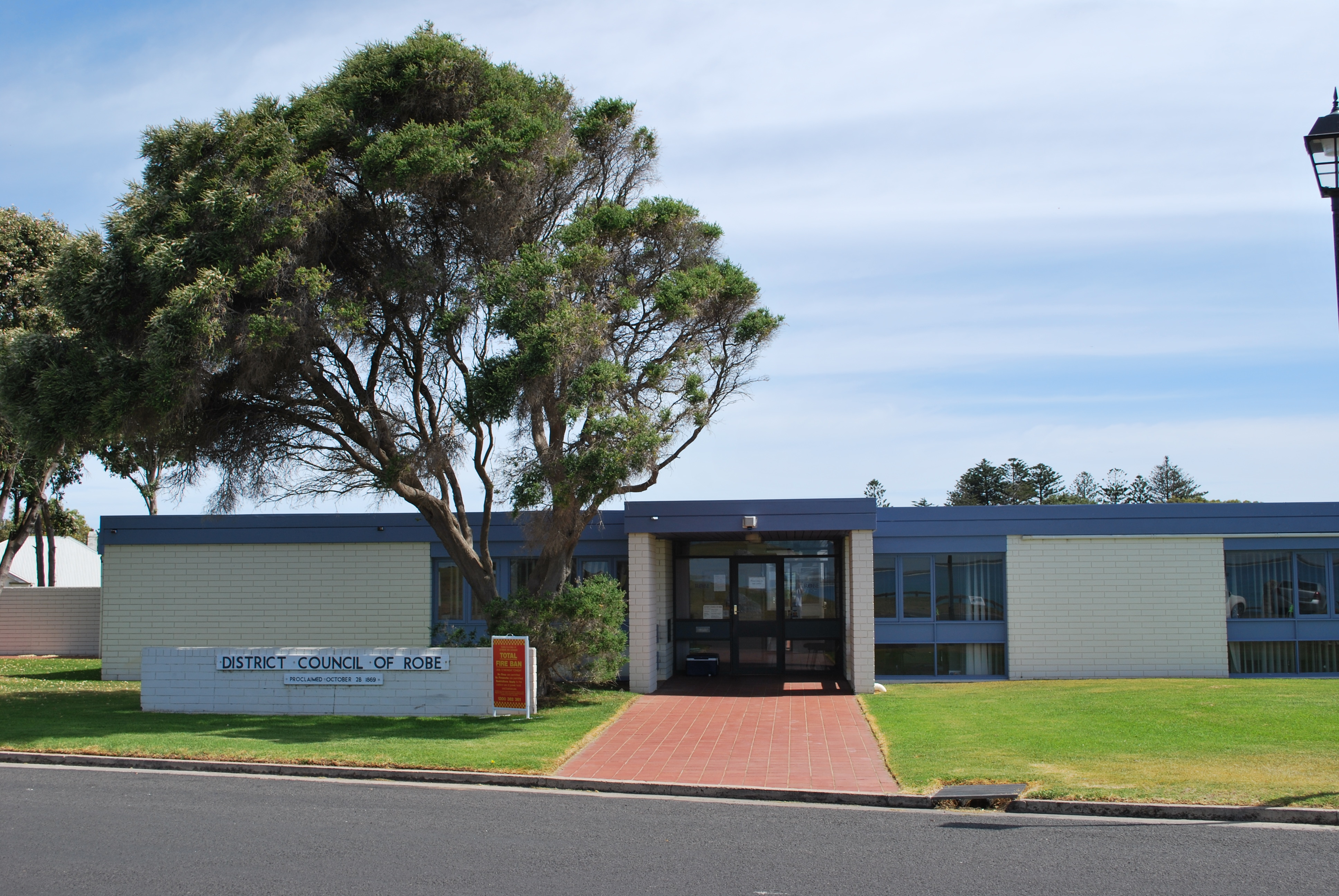
Offices in Robe

The District Council of Robe is a local government area located in the Limestone Coast area of South Australia. The main offices are in Robe, the town after which the council is named. The district relies on a mix of agriculture, fisheries and tourism as major components of its economy.

== History ==
The district's coastline, like much of South Australia, was explored by Captains Nicolas Baudin and Matthew Flinders in 1802, with Freycinet of Baudin's expedition naming Guichen Bay after Admiral de Guichen.

The first major town was officially founded and named 'Robe' by the Government of South Australia in 1846 after Major Frederick Holt Robe, Governor of South Australia who had selected the site in 1846.

It was the first major town to be established in the south east of the colony. Greytown on Rivoli Bay had been surveyed a few months earlier and was the site of a small settlement but Robe was the first administrative centre and was the focus of public and commercial life in the area.

The District Council of Robe was proclaimed on 28 October 1869.

By the 1880s, the district began a slow decline, and increasingly relied on its fishing and agricultural industries as its status as a major port and industrial hub decreased.

== Economy ==
The district still is heavily reliant on the fishing and agricultural industries, with rock lobster one of the main catches in the area.

The district has a variety of agricultural industries, with cereal crops, beef cattle and sheep prominent. The district also has a wine industry associated with the Mount Benson wine region.

Tourism has been an increasingly important part of the economy, with up to 15,000 tourists every year. The town has a large number of historic buildings, as well as natural attractions. The town is listed as one of the state's historical towns in the Heritage Conservation Branch's Master Interpretation Plan.

== Geography ==
Robe is the major town in the district; however, the council also includes the localities of Boatswain Point, Greenways and Mount Benson, and parts of Bray, Clay Wells, Nora Creina and Reedy Creek.

== Councillors ==
| Ward | Councillor | Notes |
|---|---|---|
| Mayor | Lisa Ruffell | Member of the Liberal Party |
| Unsubdivided | Nick Brown | |
| Unsubdivided | Marcia Dening | |
| Unsubdivided | David Laurie | |
| Unsubdivided | Kylie Peel | |
| Unsubdivided | Duncan Young | |
| Unsubdivided | Ned Wright | |
