= Lake Hawdon System Important Bird Area =

Coordinates: 37°16′34″S 139°55′35″E

Location in South Australia

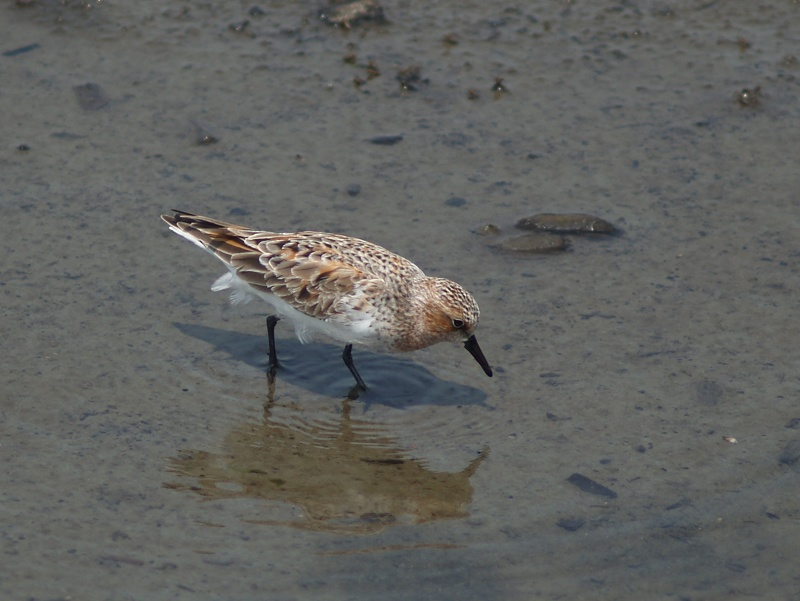
The IBA is an important site for red-necked stints

The Lake Hawdon System Important Bird Area comprises an area of 374 square kilometres (144 square miles) covering a series of five coastal lakes on the Limestone Coast of South Australia. They are the most important of a string of regional lakes occupying swale corridors between modern and historical sand dunes.

== Description ==
The Important Bird Area (IBA) lies between the towns of Robe and Beachport. It includes the following lakes listed in order from north to south - Hawdon, Robe, Eliza, St Clair and George, and the area extending for a distance of one kilometre (0.62 mi) inland from each in order to include habitat used by critically endangered orange-bellied parrots. Characteristics of the lakes are:

- Lake Hawdon – shallow, semi-permanent, brackish lake which is divided into a northern basin measuring six by six kilometres (3.7 by 3.7 mi) and a southern basin measuring nine by four point five kilometres (5.6 by 2.8 mi) with a maximum water depth of about one metre (3.3 ft);
- Lake Robe – 406 hectares (1,000 acres) much smaller than Lake Hawdon
- Lake Eliza – hypersaline coastal lake with maximum depth of 1.4 metres (4 feet 7 inches);
- Lake St Clair – 189 hectares (470 acres) similar to Lake Eliza but more saline
- Lake George – about thirteen by eight kilometres (8.1 by 5.0 mi) with maximum depth of 3.5 metres (11 feet); naturally hypersaline but functions as an estuary with an outlet to the sea.

== Criteria for nomination as an IBA ==
The wetland system was identified by BirdLife International as an IBA because it regularly supports over 1% of the world populations of red-necked stint, and often of sharp-tailed sandpipers, double-banded plovers and banded stilts. It also provides habitat for orange-bellied parrots, Australasian bitterns, rufous bristlebirds and striated fieldwrens. The adjacent beaches and offshore islets, from Cowrtie Island to Baudin Rocks, sometimes support breeding fairy terns.

== Associated protected areas ==
While the IBA has no statutory status, it does overlap the following protected areas declared by the South Australian government: Beachport Conservation Park, Lake Robe Game Reserve, Lake St Clair Conservation Park and Little Dip Conservation Park.

== See also ==
- List of birds of South Australia
