= Beachport =

- Town
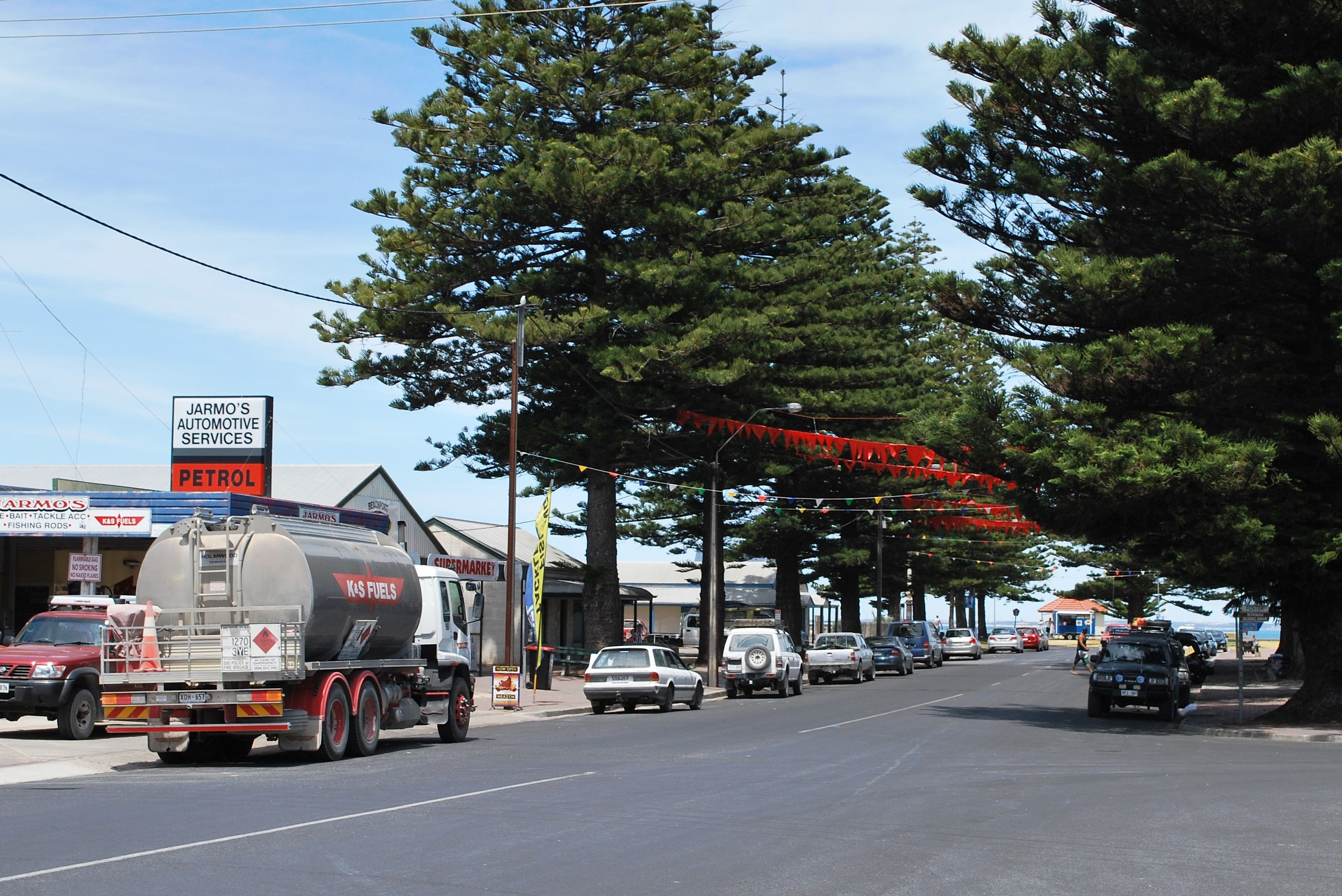
- Main street of Beachport

- Coordinates: 37°29′01″S 140°00′30″E
- Country: Australia
- State: South Australia
- Region: Limestone Coast
- LGA: Wattle Range Council
- Location: 311 km (193 mi) SE of Adelaide; 34 km (21 mi) NW of Millicent
- Established: 23 May 1878 (town); 18 December 1997 (locality)

Government
  - State electorate: MacKillop
  - Federal division: Barker
- Elevation: 5 m (16 ft)

Population
  - Total: 530 (UCL 2021)
- Time zone: UTC+9:30 (ACST)
  - Summer (DST): UTC+10:30 (ACST)
- Postcode: 5280
- County: Grey
- Mean max temp: 19.7 °C (67.5 °F)
- Mean min temp: 9.6 °C (49.3 °F)
- Annual rainfall: 608.2 mm (23.94 in)
Localities around Beachport
Bray	Bray	Bray
Nora Creina; Ocean	Beachport	Magarey; Rendelsham; Southend
Ocean	Ocean; Rivoli Bay	Southend
- Locations; Adjoining localities

Beachport is a small coastal town in the Australian state of South Australia about 311 kilometres (193 mi) south-east of the state capital of Adelaide and about 34 kilometres (21 mi) north-west of the municipal seat in Millicent, located at the northern end of Rivoli Bay. Beachport has a large crayfishing fleet, and is known for its 772-metre (2,533 ft)-long jetty, the second-longest in South Australia after the one at Port Germein. The town's Norfolk pines, white sand beach and clear waters are alluring to visitors.

Prior to European settlement starting in the 1820s, the Bungandidj people from the Mount Gambier region were the early settlers in this area. Archeological evidence shows they have inhabited this area for upwards of 30,000 years. In the Bungandidj language, this area was called Wirmalngrang.

== History ==
Following the discovery and naming of Rivoli Bay in 1802 by French navigator Nicolas Baudin, a whaling station was established there in the 1830s. The whaling industry soon declined, to be followed in succeeding decades by European pastoralists settling in the hinterland. Whaling was then superseded by a booming wool export industry, leading to the need for a port. The town was named on 23 May 1878 for the then British Secretary of State for the Colonies, Michael Hicks Beach, 1st Earl St Aldwyn.

=== World War II ===
Beachport is the location of what are believed to be the first casualties of World War II on Australian soil. On 12 July 1941, a local fisherman discovered and towed to Beachport a German sea mine, laid either by the raider Pinguin or the minelayer Passat. The following day, two able seamen, Thomas Todd and William Danswan, part of a three-man Rendering Mines Safe (REMS) team, were killed when a wave lifted the mine and caused it to explode on the beach while they were attempting to defuse it. A monument now stands in the town to honour them.

=== Transport ===
Beachport was officially proclaimed a port on 21 November 1878. A lighthouse was erected close by on Penguin Island and a railway from Mount Gambier was completed in the same year. A wool and grain store was built in 1879, served by the railway, thereby providing a facility to link the export trade by rail and sea. The railway closed in 1957. The old wool and grain store has been preserved and today serves as a National Trust museum.

=== Jetty ===
The jetty is the second-longest in South Australia. It was completed in 1882 to a length of 4,000 feet, including a 122-foot T section at the deep-water end. The deep-water structure was found 'unsatisfactory' and the jetty was shortened to its present length of 2,536 feet. The jetty supported a spur line of the Mount Gambier railway line, and two of the dolly-carts can still be seen on the foreshore as picnic tables. The jetty has lower platforms, and a slipway for a permanent lifeboat named City of Adelaide, although the lifeboat, winch, and slipway extensions into the ocean are no longer present. The slipway and winch were enclosed in a large shed until this was removed around 1965.

== Heritage and facilities ==
Popular recreational fishing spots include the Salmon Hole, the jetty and 10 Mile Beach. Other attractions include the Salt Lake, Lake George and the rugged coastal views of the Scenic Drive. The nearby Beachport Conservation Park, which includes 710 hectares (1,800 acres) of beaches, rocky headlands and boobialla scrub, overlaps with the much larger Lake Hawdon System Important Bird Area. In the sandhills adjacent to Beachport is the Pool of Siloam, named in allusion to the biblical Pool of Siloam, as locals claim it has healing properties similar to the pool in Jerusalem. Said to be seven times saltier than the ocean, it is enjoyed by swimmers and has related amenities.

The Catholic Church in Beachport is dedicated to St. Brigid.

Beachport has a number of sites listed on the South Australian Heritage Register, including:

- Railway Terrace: Beachport Customs House
- 5 Railway Terrace: Wool and Grain Store
- Rivoli Bay: Beachport Jetty
