= Robe, South Australia =

Robe
- Town
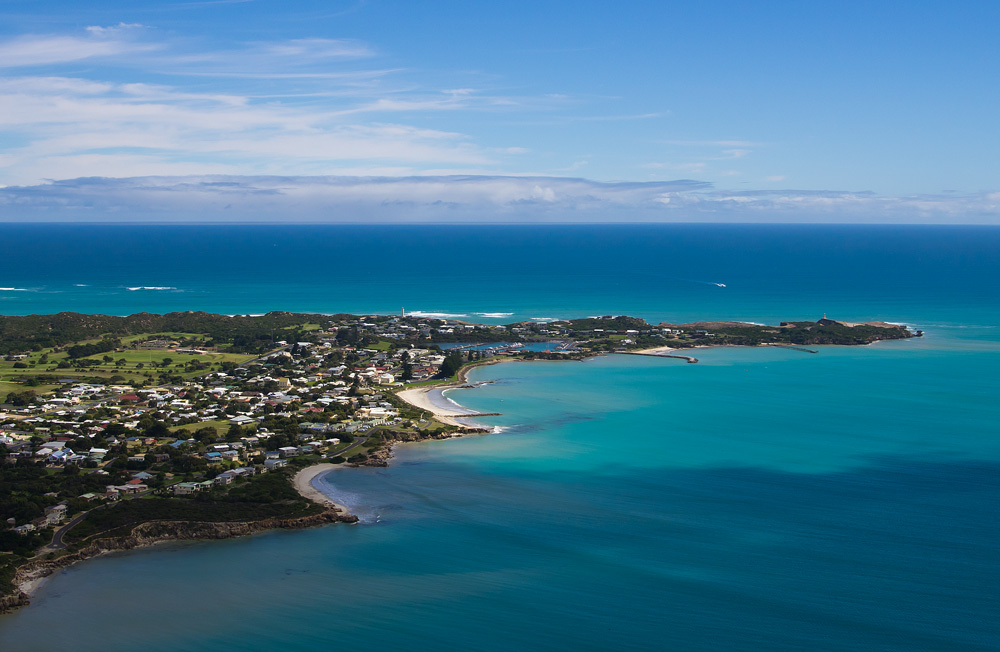
- Looking west: the northern area of the town

- Coordinates: 37°09′51″S 139°45′15″E
- Country: Australia
- State: South Australia
- Region: Limestone Coast
- LGA: District Council of Robe
- Location: 337 km (209 mi) SE of Adelaide; 131 km (81 mi) NW of Mount Gambier
- Established: 19 March 1846 (town)

Government
  - State electorate: MacKillop
  - Federal division: Barker

Population
  - Total: 1,156 (UCL 2021)
- Postcode: 5276
- County: County of Robe
- Mean max temp: 18.2 °C (64.8 °F)
- Mean min temp: 10.9 °C (51.6 °F)
- Annual rainfall: 631.6 mm (24.87 in)
Localities around Robe
Ocean	Guichen Bay	Mount Benson
Ocean	Robe	Mount Benson; Bray
Ocean	Nora Creina	Nora Creina; Bray

Robe is a town and fishing port located in the Limestone Coast region in the south-eastern part of South Australia. The town's distinctive combination of historical buildings, ocean, fishing fleets, lakes and dense bush attracts many tourists. Robe lies on the southern shore of Guichen Bay, just off the Princes Highway. At the 2021 census, Robe had a population of 1252. Robe is the main town in the District Council of Robe local government area. It is in the state electorate of MacKillop and the federal Division of Barker.

== History ==
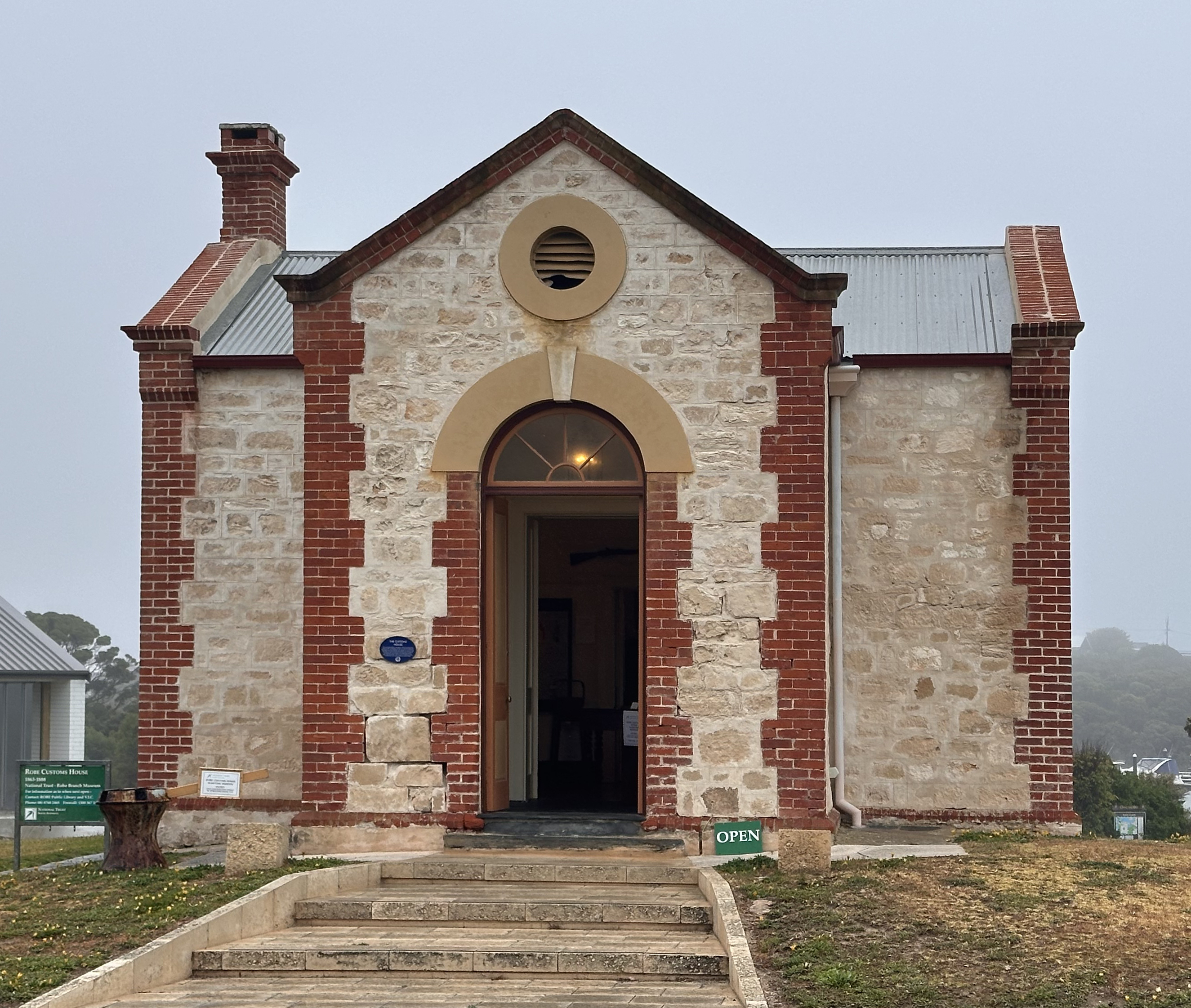
The former customs house, a legacy of pre‑Federation times when individual colonies collected customs duties, is typical of many heritage-listed places in Robe built of local limestone

=== Early history ===
Robe is situated on the ancestral lands of the Buandig and Ngarrindjeri peoples.

Europeans founded the town of Robe on 19 March 1846, ten years after the Province of South Australia was established, as a seaport, administrative centre, and township.

Robe was named after the fourth Governor of South Australia, Major Frederick Robe, who chose the site as a port in 1845. The town was proclaimed as a port in 1847. It became South Australia's second-busiest international port, after Port Adelaide, in the 1850s. Robe's trade was drawn from a large hinterland that extended into western Victoria, and many roadside inns were built to cater for the bullock teamsters bringing down the wool, including the Bush Inn, still standing on the outskirts of Robe. Exports included horses, sheep skins, and wool.

The Customs House has been listed on the South Australian Heritage Register since 1980.

=== "Robe Walk" ===
During the Victorian gold rushes after the discovery of gold in Victoria in 1851, the government of the colony of Victoria introduced a landing tax of £10 per person to deter Chinese immigrants – more than the cost of their voyage. To bypass the tax, more than 16,000 Chinese people landed at Robe to walk overland for 320 kilometres (200 miles) to the goldfields, mainly at Ballarat and Bendigo. The walk became known as the "Robe Walk".

=== Shipwrecks ===
There have been a number of shipwrecks along the coast, with many occurring in the mid-19th century. They include:

- Phaeton – 2 February 1857
- Sultana – 27 April 1857
- Alma 15 December 1861
- Livingstone – 16 December 1861
- SS Admella – 6 August 1859
- Koning Willem II – 30 June 1857, on Long Beach around 5 km (3.1 mi) east of Robe

A stone obelisk was built on Cape Dombey in 1852 to help ships navigate safely into the bay, and an automatic lighthouse was built on higher ground in 1973.

=== Decline in economic importance ===
Robe's importance decreased with the building of railways in the 19th century to Kingston and Beachport, about 40 kilometres (25 miles) respectively to its north and south.

== Heritage listings ==
Robe has many heritage-listed places, including:

- Burr Street: Robe Cemetery
- Cape Dombey: Cape Dombey Obelisk
- 1A Hagen Street: Robe House
- 2 Hagen Street: The Lady Star of the Sea Catholic Chapel and Schoolroom
- 7 Karatta Road: Karatta House
- Main Road: Lakeside
- Main Road: Lakeside Stables and Coach House
- Main South Eastern Road: Richmond Park Homestead
- Millicent Road: Bush Inn
- 2 Mundy Terrace: Robe Post Office and Telegraph Station
- Nora Creina Road: The Hermitage
- Nora Creina Road: CSIRO Field Research Station
- Nora Creina Road: Dingley Dell (dwelling)
- Nora Creina Road: Bellevue Homestead
- Obelisk Road: Robe Gaol Ruins
- Royal Circus: Royal Circus and Slipwall
- 1 Royal Circus: Robe Customs House
- Smillie Street: Robe Institute
- Smillie Street: Criterion Hotel
- 8 Smillie Street: Robe Courthouse, Police Station, Old Cells and Stables
- 10 Smillie Street: Ormerod Cottages
- 24 Smillie Street: Bank of South Australia Building
- 26 Smillie Street: Campbell's Shop
- 32 Smillie Street: Davison's Shop and Residence
- 38 Smillie Street: Graymasts
- 4-8 Sturt Street: Moorakyne House
- 15 Sturt Street: Granny Banks' Cottage
- 1 Victoria Street: Caledonian Inn
- 5 Victoria Street: Wilson's Saddlery
- 18 Victoria Street: Attic House

== Economy and facilities ==
Robe continues as a service centre for the surrounding rural areas and home to a fishing fleet; especially important in the local economy is the rocklobster fishery.

== Attractions and tourism ==
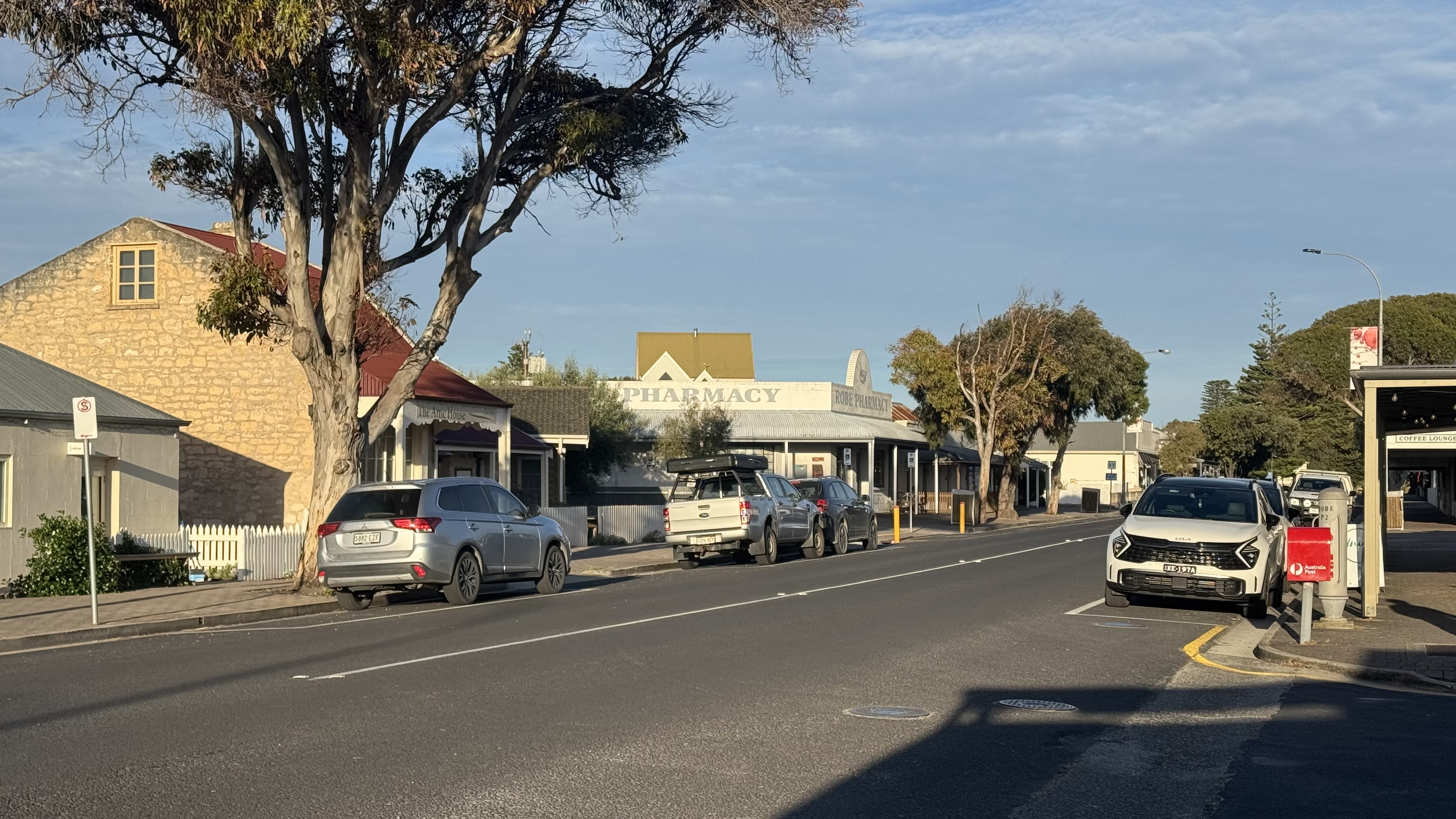
Victoria Street, looking west

Robe has always been a popular holiday destination for South Australians, but since Victorian tourists have discovered it, it has become the most popular coastal town in the state.

There are several beaches along the Robe and Guichen Bay coast. Long Beach, east of Robe and stretching up the eastern side of the bay, is 10–17 km (6.2–10.6 mi) long. During summer, the sand is very firm, and cars are allowed on the beach. It is Robe's main surfing beach, and beach fishing is also a popular recreation along this stretch. There is a surf school during summer months and a surf shop. The largest surf is found past the third ramp.

Other beaches include the Outlet, known for its birdlife; Fox's Beach, with a rocky reef off it; and Town Beach, which has a pontoon for swimming to.

== Demographics and governance ==
At the 2021 census, the town of Robe had a population of 1252.

Robe is the main town in the District Council of Robe local government area. It is in the state electorate of MacKillop and the federal Division of Barker. It lies within the Limestone Coast region of South Australia.

The County of Robe is one of the 49 cadastral counties of South Australia, proclaimed by Governor Frederick Robe in 1846.

== Climate ==
Robe has a warm-summer mediterranean climate (Köppen: Csb), with mild, dry summers and cool, wet winters. Average maxima range from 22.7 °C (72.9 °F) in January and February to 13.9 °C (57.0 °F) in July, and average minima from 14.3 °C (57.7 °F) in January to 8.6 °C (47.5 °F) in July. The mean annual rainfall is 622.0 mm (24.49 in) spread on 165 days. The town has 56 clear days and 163 cloudy days per annum. Extreme temperatures have ranged from 39.6 °C (103.3 °F) on 14 February 1981 to −2.6 °C (27.3 °F) on 19 July 1982.

Climate data for Robe, elev. 3 m (9.8 ft) (1991–2020, extremes 1884–2025)
Month	Jan	Feb	Mar	Apr	May	Jun	Jul	Aug	Sep	Oct	Nov	Dec	Year
Record high °C (°F)	39.2 (102.6)	39.6 (103.3)	35.8 (96.4)	31.7 (89.1)	26.5 (79.7)	20.4 (68.7)	21.2 (70.2)	22.8 (73.0)	26.6 (79.9)	33.3 (91.9)	36.3 (97.3)	37.1 (98.8)	39.6 (103.3)
Mean daily maximum °C (°F)	22.7 (72.9)	22.7 (72.9)	21.4 (70.5)	19.3 (66.7)	16.7 (62.1)	14.5 (58.1)	13.9 (57.0)	14.7 (58.5)	16.3 (61.3)	18.4 (65.1)	20.0 (68.0)	21.4 (70.5)	18.5 (65.3)
Mean daily minimum °C (°F)	14.3 (57.7)	14.2 (57.6)	13.0 (55.4)	11.7 (53.1)	10.5 (50.9)	9.1 (48.4)	8.6 (47.5)	8.9 (48.0)	9.7 (49.5)	10.6 (51.1)	11.9 (53.4)	13.1 (55.6)	11.3 (52.3)
Record low °C (°F)	5.2 (41.4)	5.1 (41.2)	5.0 (41.0)	2.2 (36.0)	0.8 (33.4)	−0.1 (31.8)	−2.6 (27.3)	0.2 (32.4)	0.8 (33.4)	2.1 (35.8)	3.3 (37.9)	3.9 (39.0)	−2.6 (27.3)
Average precipitation mm (inches)	18.6 (0.73)	19.4 (0.76)	28.5 (1.12)	39.3 (1.55)	66.5 (2.62)	92.1 (3.63)	99.5 (3.92)	91.8 (3.61)	63.2 (2.49)	40.1 (1.58)	34.1 (1.34)	28.1 (1.11)	622.0 (24.49)
Average precipitation days (≥ 0.2 mm)	6.7	5.8	8.9	13.3	17.7	19.4	21.2	20.7	17.6	13.6	10.4	9.7	165.0
Average afternoon relative humidity (%)	63	65	66	68	75	77	77	73	70	67	64	64	69
Average dew point °C (°F)	13.0 (55.4)	13.5 (56.3)	12.7 (54.9)	11.5 (52.7)	10.9 (51.6)	9.5 (49.1)	8.8 (47.8)	8.6 (47.5)	9.2 (48.6)	10.0 (50.0)	11.0 (51.8)	11.9 (53.4)	10.9 (51.6)
Source: Australian Bureau of Meteorology (humidity 1991–2010)

Climate data is also available for Robe Airport, located 4.6 kilometres (2.9 mi) SE of the town. The inland weather station has a greater diurnal and seasonal range, and experiences slightly less rainfall.

Climate data for Robe Airfield (37º10'48"S, 139º48'36"E, 3 m AMSL) (2003–2024)
Month	Jan	Feb	Mar	Apr	May	Jun	Jul	Aug	Sep	Oct	Nov	Dec	Year
Record high °C (°F)	42.1 (107.8)	41.7 (107.1)	38.4 (101.1)	33.5 (92.3)	29.1 (84.4)	24.3 (75.7)	19.8 (67.6)	26.5 (79.7)	28.0 (82.4)	35.0 (95.0)	38.0 (100.4)	43.3 (109.9)	43.3 (109.9)
Mean daily maximum °C (°F)	24.6 (76.3)	24.2 (75.6)	23.1 (73.6)	20.5 (68.9)	17.4 (63.3)	15.2 (59.4)	14.5 (58.1)	15.3 (59.5)	16.8 (62.2)	18.8 (65.8)	21.2 (70.2)	22.9 (73.2)	19.5 (67.2)
Mean daily minimum °C (°F)	13.0 (55.4)	12.8 (55.0)	11.4 (52.5)	9.6 (49.3)	8.6 (47.5)	6.7 (44.1)	6.7 (44.1)	7.2 (45.0)	8.0 (46.4)	8.6 (47.5)	10.5 (50.9)	11.9 (53.4)	9.6 (49.3)
Record low °C (°F)	4.0 (39.2)	2.7 (36.9)	0.6 (33.1)	0.4 (32.7)	−2.0 (28.4)	−3.5 (25.7)	−1.4 (29.5)	−2.0 (28.4)	−1.4 (29.5)	−1.0 (30.2)	1.8 (35.2)	1.0 (33.8)	−3.5 (25.7)
Average precipitation mm (inches)	19.8 (0.78)	21.6 (0.85)	23.5 (0.93)	40.3 (1.59)	66.0 (2.60)	90.7 (3.57)	97.0 (3.82)	88.0 (3.46)	53.7 (2.11)	35.1 (1.38)	32.7 (1.29)	29.0 (1.14)	599.5 (23.60)
Average precipitation days (≥ 0.2 mm)	5.8	5.3	8.5	13.3	18.3	19.7	21.8	21.3	16.8	13.2	9.8	8.8	162.6
Source: Bureau of Meteorology

== Notable people ==
Notable people associated with Robe include:

- Jordan Dawson, AFL Footballer who as of 2025 plays for the Adelaide Crows and has captained the team since 2023

== See also ==
- Little Dip Conservation Park
- Lake Hawdon System Important Bird Area
- Woakwine Conservation Park
