= Millicent, South Australia =

Millicent
- Town
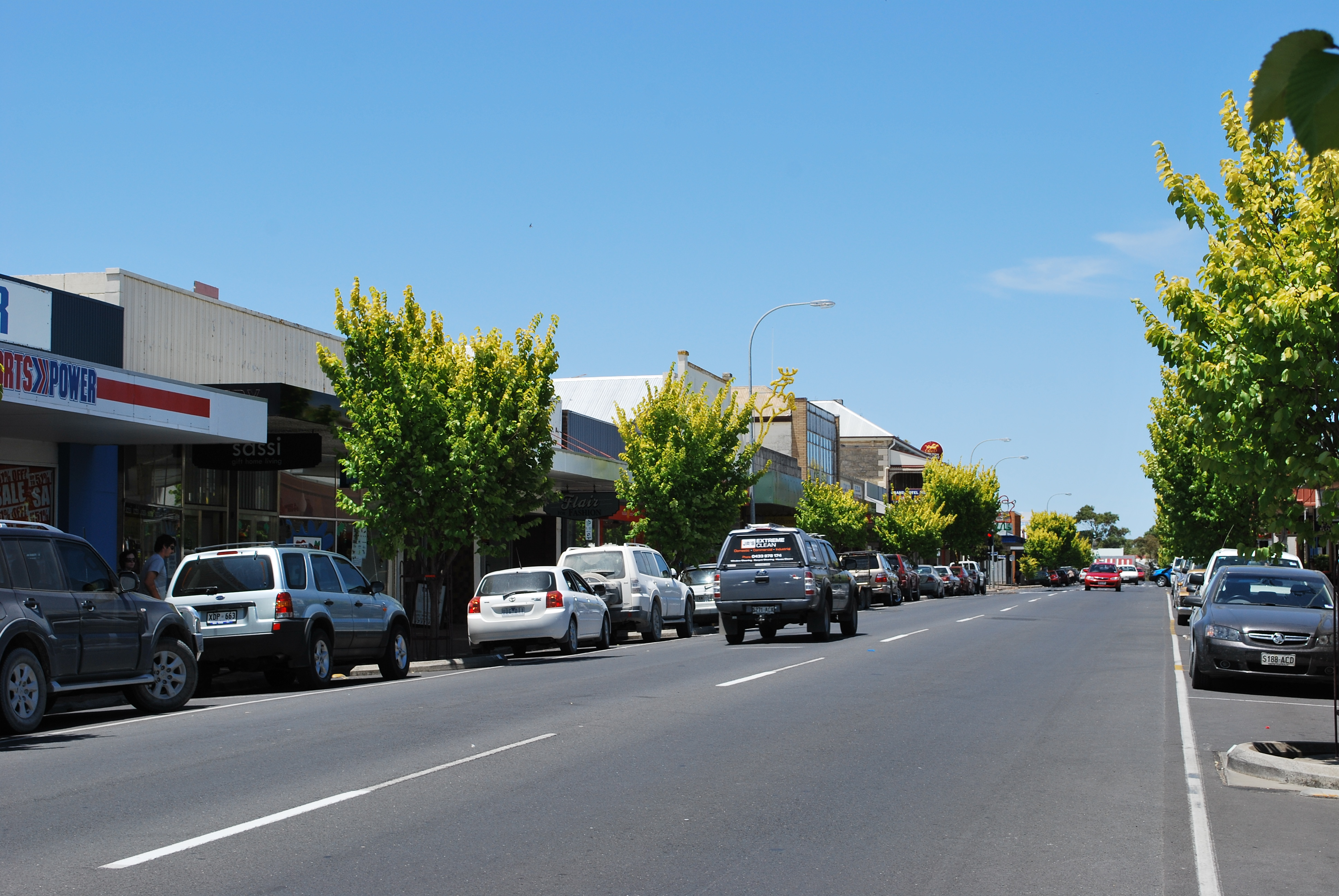
- Main street

- Coordinates: 37°35′48″S 140°21′09″E
- Country: Australia
- State: South Australia
- Region: Limestone Coast
- LGA: Wattle Range Council
- Location: 399 km (248 mi) SE of Adelaide; 50 km (31 mi) N of Mount Gambier

Government
  - State electorate: MacKillop
  - Federal division: Barker
- Elevation: 19 m (62 ft)

Population
  - Total: 4,760 (UCL 2021)
- Time zone: UTC+9:30 (ACST)
  - Summer (DST): ACST
- Postcode: 5280
- County: Grey
- Mean max temp: 19.0 °C (66.2 °F)
- Mean min temp: 8.2 °C (46.8 °F)
- Annual rainfall: 708.4 mm (27.89 in)
Localities around Millicent
Hatherleigh; Rendelsham	Hatherleigh	Hatherleigh; Sebastopol
Rendelsham; Canunda	Millicent	Sebastopol; Rocky Camp
Tantanoola	Tantanoola	Tantanoola

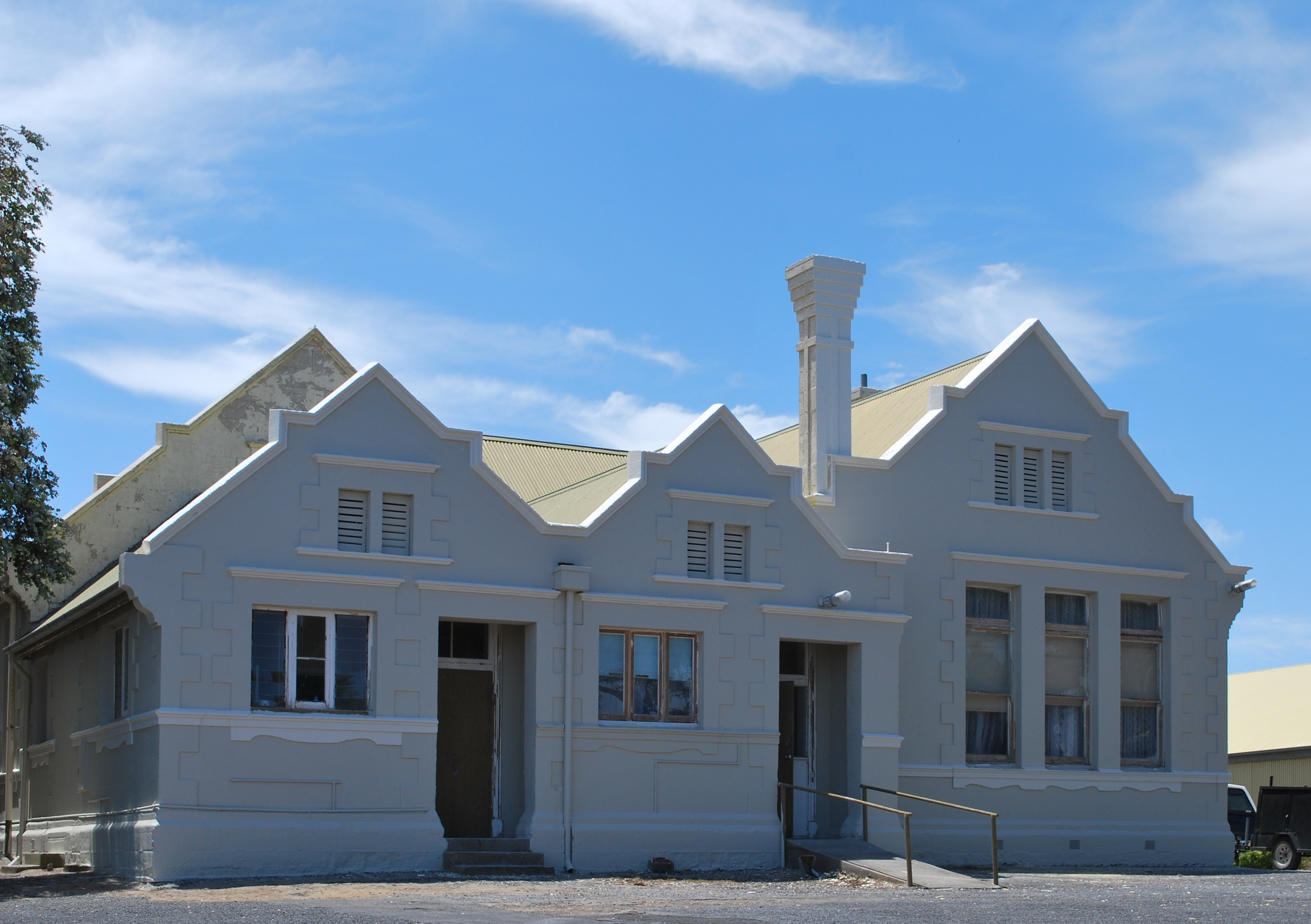
Old Millicent Primary School building which the museum shares with the South East Family History Group

Millicent is a town in the Australian state of South Australia located about 399 kilometres (248 mi) south-east of the state capital of Adelaide and about 50 kilometres (31 mi) north of the regional centre of Mount Gambier. In the 2021 census, the population was 4,760.

The town is home to the Millicent National Trust Museum, Millicent Library & Gallery, Millicent Civic & Arts Centre, the South East Family History Group, and more attractions where locals commonly go to. Millicent is also nearby to the Tantanoola Caves Conservation Park and the Canunda National Park.

Close by is Lake Bonney SE which is home to South Australia's largest wind turbine farm. Millicent is also home to a constructed lake, Lake McIntyre, home to many bird and wildlife species. Lake McIntyre takes approximately 20 minutes to walk around, and the lake also hosts over 50 species of water birds and waders.

== History ==
Millicent was proclaimed in 1870 after a township developed on the limestone ridge in the centre of the newly drained Millicent flats. It is named after Millicent Glen (née Short), wife of one of the early pioneers and daughter of the first Anglican Bishop of Adelaide, Augustus Short.

Millicent is also home to a Kimberly Clark Australia paper mill which is located 10 km away from the town; it is the largest employer in the area with approximately 400 employees. The factory produces Kleenex, Cottonelle and Viva product lines for the Australian and some regional overseas markets. Millicent is also well known for its primary production, which include many varied crops. Pine and blue gum plantation cover large areas. It is also home to the only seaweed harvesting and processing plant in South Australia.

=== Heritage listings ===
Millicent has a number of heritage-listed sites, including:

- 48 George Street (rear): 1874 Police Lockup
- Mayurra Road: Mayura Homestead
- Plunkett Terrace: South East Drainage Scheme Powder Magazine
- Frontage Road: Lake Bonney Woolwash and Fellmongery Sites

== Transport ==
The Princes Highway (B1) passes through Millicent from the north in a south-easterly direction towards Mount Gambier and into Victoria. The south-east end of the Southern Ports Highway (B101) terminates at Millicent.

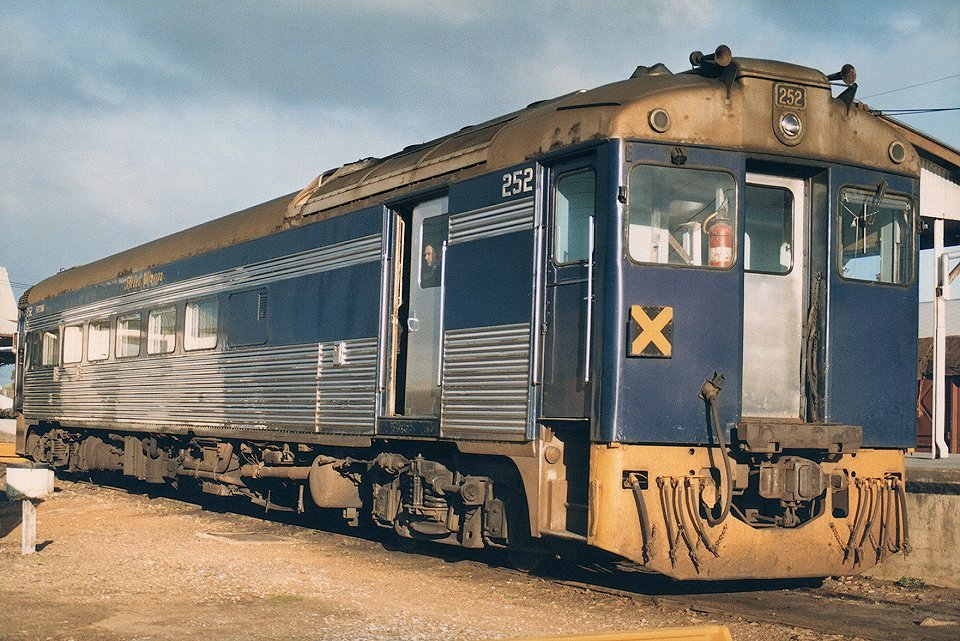
Bluebird 252 "Blue Wren" in Millicent dead end siding, July 1983, ready for piloting to loco out in New marshalling yard.

Millicent was on the route of the Mount Gambier and Rivoli Bay railway, which was constructed in 1879. The railway was shortened to Millicent in 1959, after the section between Millicent and Mount Gambier was converted from narrow to broad gauge in the mid-1950s. It has not been used for freight since the broad gauge line was isolated in April 1995 (when the main line between Adelaide and Melbourne was converted to standard gauge) then to Limestone Coast Railway passenger tourist services in 1998 until 21 March 1999.

== Sport ==
The Millicent Bandits baseball club, comprising both junior and senior teams, are a part of the Mount Gambier and District Baseball League. Bandits baseball club has produced junior players that have competed at state level and also in the national Little League competition.

The Millicent football and netball clubs play in the Western Border Football League. The nickname of the clubs is the Saints, and the teams share the same red, white and black colours as the St Kilda Football Club in the AFL. The town also has strong links with the Mid-South Eastern League, a league made up of teams representing the smaller towns in the district. Many Millicent residents play for teams from the neighbouring towns of Mount Burr (green and gold, the Mozzies), Tantanoola (red and white, the Tigers) and Hatherleigh (blue and gold, the Eagles). The town's basketball team is called the Magic. (colours: silver, red, black). There is a Soccer club in Millicent Called the Millicent United Soccer Club (green, gold).

The Millicent racecourse last held official meetings in the 1960s, but is still used daily by local horse trainers for trackwork gallops.

== Popular culture ==
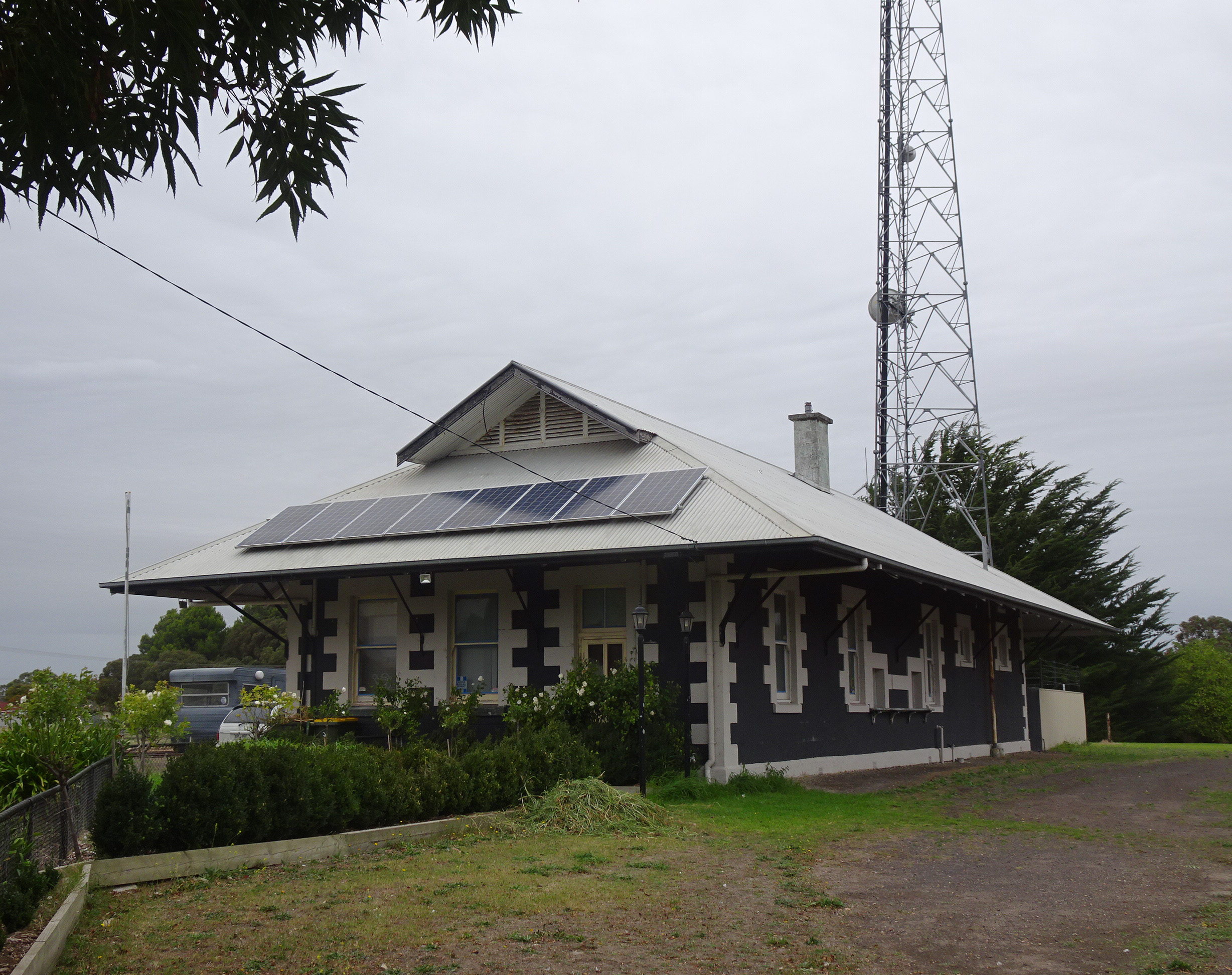
The studios of radio station 5THE (107.7 FM)

=== Geltwood Festival ===
Millicent hosts a festival that is held once a year in late March and early April which is called the Geltwood Festival. The Geltwood Festival is about a ship that was wrecked in the late 1800s. The festival is known for arts and crafts, the shops of Millicent put quilts in the front windows. George Street is closed for the public to walk on to do various of activities, stalls and a small car Show 'N Shine. The festival has been running for over nine years and every year attracts crowds from neighbour towns of Millicent and Western Victoria.

=== Pines Enduro ===
Millicent also hosts the Teagle Excavations ARB Pines Enduro 400 at Teagle's Quarry just outside Millicent in late September or early October once a year. On Saturday's at the Pines Enduro they have the qualifying's and the Dash for Cash, on Sunday the big race is held from the Quarry and then they go into the Mount Burr Pines until they come back to the quarry to finish.

=== Radio station ===
Millicent has a community radio station broadcasting from the former railway station in Millicent, 5THE (107.7 FM). 5THE FM has won the national award of Most Outstanding Small Station award in the nation, a personal national award of Most Outstanding Contribution in Australia and has been a finalist in the National Awards 7 times in recent years in varying categories including Most Outstanding Station 4 times. 5THE FM was awarded the MBCA Most Outstanding Community Spirit Award in 2016 for outstanding contribution to community which includes Radio Courses run for local schools each spanning a 26-week period and is celebrated with an Outside Broadcast from the station's mobile studio in the school yard and features all students from the course.

5THE FM is the only radio station in Wattle Range, broadcasts on 107.7 and live streams.

=== Recreation ===
Millicent has access to all forms of recreation other than snow. It boasts access to beach fishing off the expansive coastline from Beachport, Southend, Canunda and through to Carpenters Rocks. Four wheel driving is popular as is trail bike riding. Surfing, sailing and small boat fishing are also very popular and bush walking trails are also available in the national parks along with well equipped camp sites for basic getaways. The reclaimed lake Bonney is now open to sailing and canoeing and borders the national park of Canunda. Cave exploring is nearby at the Tantanoola caves and cave diving in the areas water filled limestone caves is nearby. Millicent is also within half an hours travel of the Coonawarra wine region and the city of Mount Gambier, home to the Blue Lake and its picnic grounds.

== Notable people ==
- Mason Redman - AFL player
- Natalie Medhurst - Netballer
- Ryan Gamble - AFL player
- Jason Baker- Musician
- Kasey Chambers - Musician

== Education ==
There are three reception to Year 7 (R-YR7) primary schools in Millicent.

- Millicent North Primary School
- Newbery Park Primary School
- St. Anthony's Catholic Primary School

There is one high school in Millicent called Millicent High School.

There is a Millicent Community Learning Centre, across from the high school for students aged 15–21 years old who have trouble with education in high school.

== Media ==
=== Newspapers ===
The local newspaper for Millicent and rural areas of the South East was the South Eastern Times. Daily newspapers from Melbourne (Herald Sun and The Age) and Adelaide (The Advertiser) as well as national newspapers such as The Australian and The Australian Financial Review Sunday Mail are also available in Millicent and the southeast SA region. Some newspapers from nearby towns such as Mount Gambier and Penola.

=== Television ===
- The Australian Broadcasting Corporation (ABC) – ABC1, ABC2, ABC3, ABC News 24 (digital channels)
- The Special Broadcasting Service (SBS) – SBS One, SBS Two (digital channels)
- The National Indigenous Television (NITV) NITV (digital channels)
- WIN Television (7, 7two, 7mate, 9, 9Gem, 9GO!, 9Life 10, 10Peach, 10Bold) as SES-8 – SES-8 relays the programming from Seven Network (Seven SA, 7two, 7mate), Nine Network (Nine SA, 9GEM, 9GO!, 9Life) & Network Ten (Ten SA, 10Peach Comedy, 10Bold Drama).
- Foxtel – Subscription Television service Foxtel is also available via satellite.

WIN Television broadcasts Nine Network programming, Channel Seven broadcasts Seven Network programming & Channel Ten broadcasts Network Ten programming. The programming schedules for these channels is the same as Channel Nine, Channel Seven and Channel Ten in Adelaide, with local commercials inserted and some variations for coverage of Australian Football League or National Rugby League matches, state and national news and current affairs programs, some lifestyle and light entertainment shows and infomercials.

=== Radio ===
ABC

- ABC South East SA (1161 and 1476 AM)
- ABC Triple J (102.5 FM)
- ABC Radio National (103.3 FM)
- ABC Classic (104.1 FM)
- ABC NewsRadio (105.7 FM)

Commercial

- Radio TAB
- Triple M Limestone Coast (963 AM)
- SAFM (96.1 FM)
- 5GTR FM (100.1 FM)
- 5THE FM (107.7 FM)
- Lime FM (104.9 FM) (Formerly Rhema FM, Mount Gambier)
