= Electoral district of MacKillop =

State electoral district of South Australia

MacKillop South Australia—House of Assembly
- Interactive map of electoral district boundaries from the 2022 state election (Note: The electorate will have no change in boundaries at the 2026 state election.)
- State: South Australia
- Created: 1993
- MP: Jason Virgo
- Party: One Nation
- Namesake: Mary MacKillop
- Electors: 27,886 (2026)
- Area: 34,138 km^{2} (13,180.8 sq mi)
- Demographic: Rural
- Coordinates: 36°39′S 139°55′E
Electorates around MacKillop:
Finniss Hammond	Chaffey	Victoria
Southern Ocean	MacKillop	Victoria
Southern Ocean	Mount Gambier	Victoria

MacKillop is a single-member electoral district for the South Australian House of Assembly. It was named in 1991 after Sister Mary MacKillop who served the local area, and later became the first Australian to be canonised as a Roman Catholic saint. MacKillop is a large rural electorate based in the south-east of the state, stretching south and west from the mouth of the Murray River to the Victorian State border, but excluding the far-southern point of the state, (which includes Mount Gambier). It contains the Kingston District Council, Naracoorte Lucindale Council, District Council of Robe, Tatiara District Council, Wattle Range Council, as well as parts of the Coorong District Council. The main population centres are Bordertown, Keith, Kingston SE, Meningie, Millicent, Naracoorte, Penola and Robe.

== History ==
MacKillop was first contested at the 1993 election, essentially as a reconfigured version of the old electoral district of Victoria. Like its predecessor, it is a comfortably safe Liberal seat. Counting its time as Victoria, the seat has been held by the Liberals or their predecessors, the Liberal and Country League, for all but two terms since the switch to single-member seats in 1938.

The last member for Victoria, Dale Baker, a former state leader of the Liberal Party, transferred to MacKillop and won it easily. Baker went on to serve as a minister in the Brown and Olsen governments before being unseated at the 1997 election by Mitch Williams, who ran as an independent after losing a preselection battle with Baker. Williams returned to the Liberal Party in 1999 and was easily re-elected as a Liberal at the 2002 election. He held the seat without serious difficulty until his retirement in 2018, handing the seat to fellow Liberal Nick McBride.

The seat is almost entirely within the equally conservative federal seat of Barker.

== Members for MacKillop ==
Member	Party	Term
Dale Baker	Liberal	1993–1997
Mitch Williams	Independent	1997–1999
Mitch Williams	Liberal	1999–2018
Nick McBride	Liberal	2018–2023
Nick McBride	Independent	2023–2026
Jason Virgo	One Nation	2026–present

== Election results ==
2026 South Australian state election: MacKillop
Party	Candidate	Votes	%	±%
One Nation	Jason Virgo	8,407	35.3	+27.2
Liberal	Rebekah Rosser	5,623	23.6	−38.7
Labor	Mark Braes	3,715	15.6	−4.5
Independent	Nick McBride	3,398	14.2	+14.2
Greens	Cathy Olsson	862	3.6	+3.6
National	Jonathan Pietzsch	780	3.3	−1.5
Legalise Cannabis	Tim Green	528	2.2	+2.2
Australian Family	Joanna Day	350	1.5	+1.5
Independent	Steven Davies	180	0.7	+0.7
Total formal votes		23,843	95.0	−1.5
Informal votes		1,267	5.0	+1.5
Turnout		25,110	90.0	−0.6
Two-candidate-preferred result
One Nation	Jason Virgo	12,123	50.8	+50.8
Liberal	Rebekah Rosser	11,720	49.2	−23.4
One Nation gain from Liberal				
