= Limestone Coast =

- Region
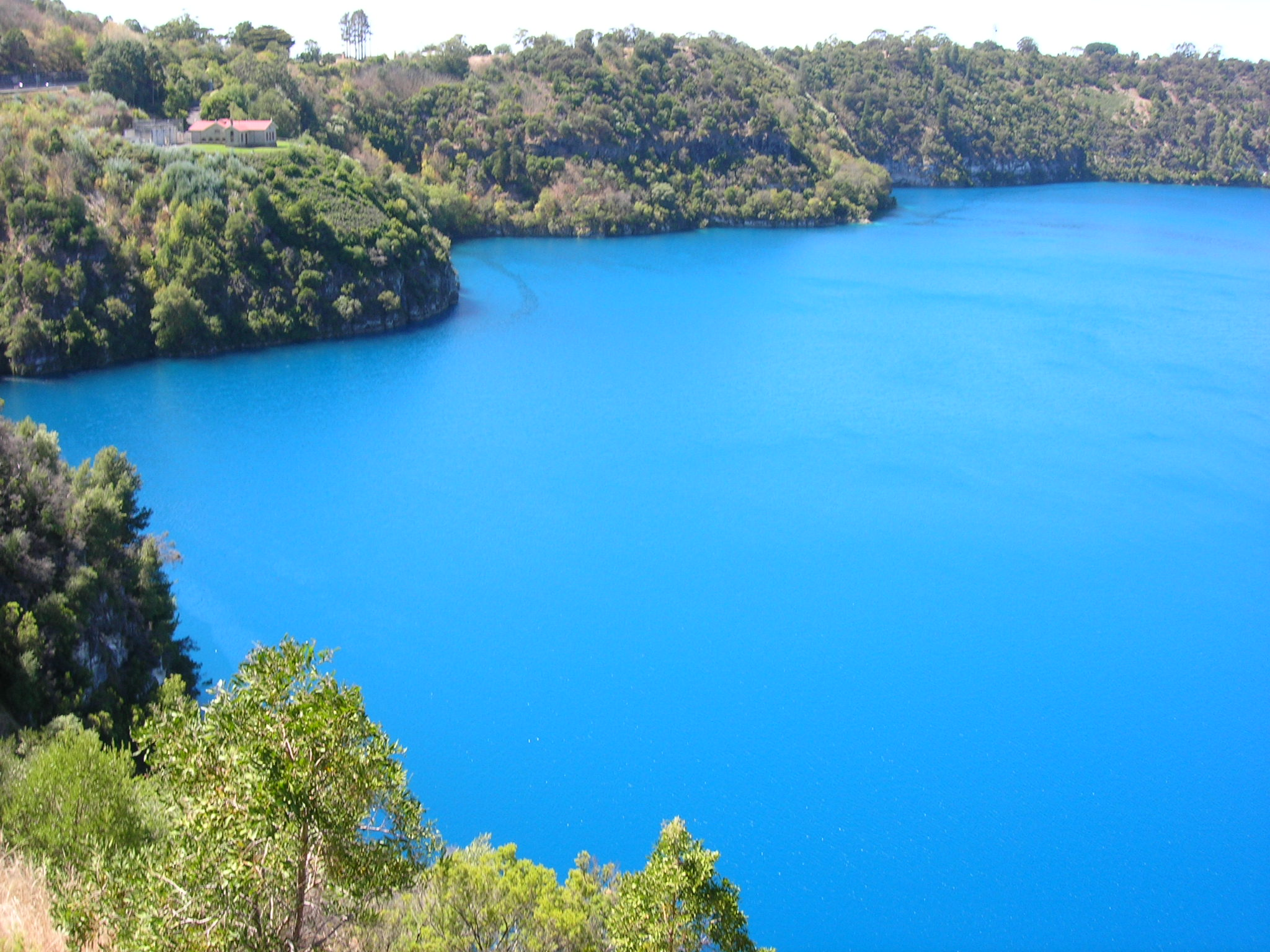
- Blue Lake, Mount Gambier

- Coordinates: 37°S 140°E
- Country: Australia
- State: South Australia
- LGA: City of Mount Gambier District Council of Grant District Council of Robe Kingston District Council Naracoorte Lucindale Council Tatiara District Council Wattle Range Council

Government
  - State electorates: MacKillop; Mount Gambier
  - Federal division: Barker

Population
  - Total: 64,585 (2006 ABS data)

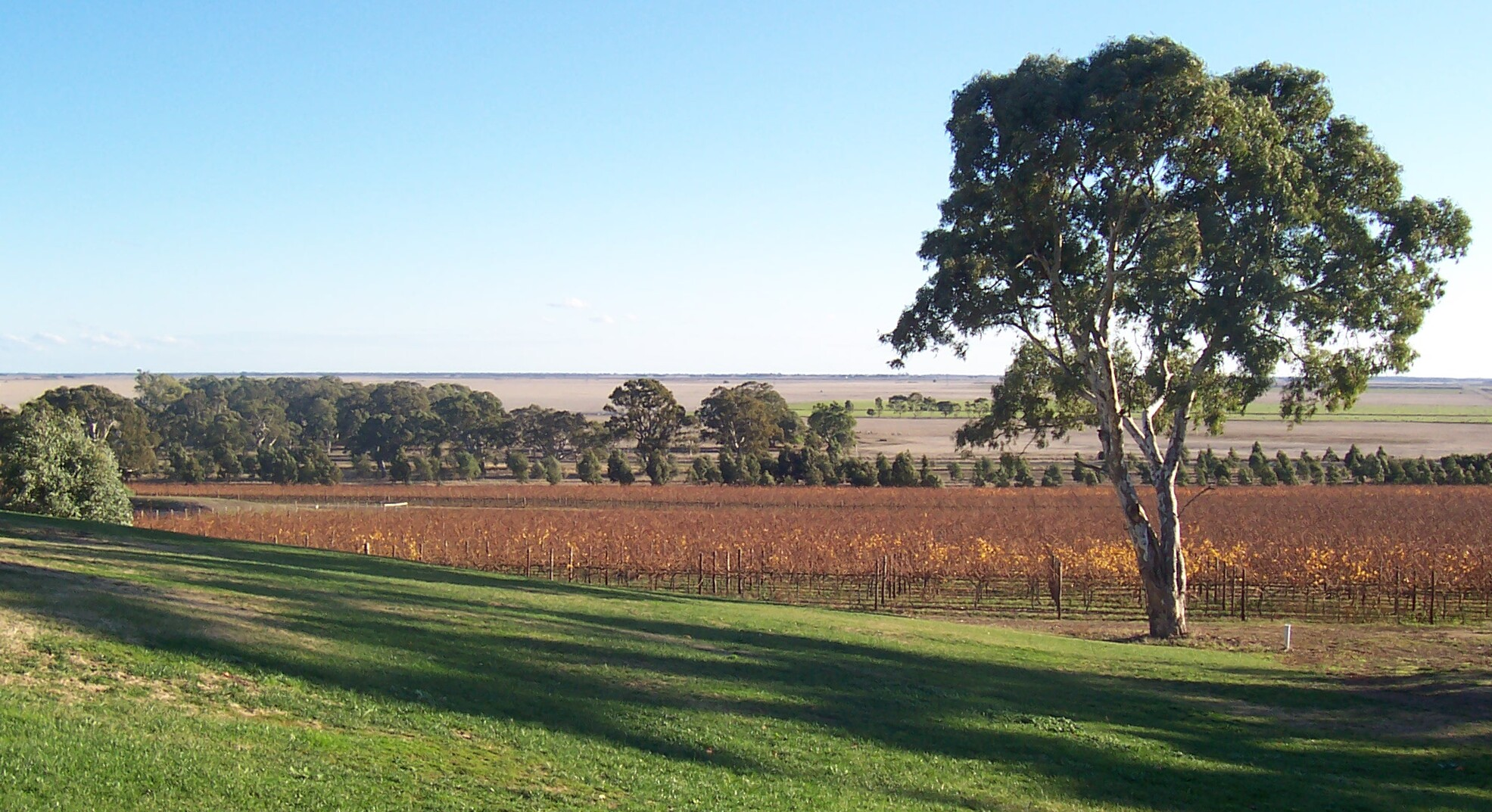
View across the plains near Naracoorte from Russet Ridge Winery

Aerial views of the Limestone Coast region of South Australia.

The Limestone Coast is a name used since the early 21st century for a South Australian government region located in the south east of South Australia which immediately adjoins the continental coastline and the Victorian border. The name is also used for a tourist region and a wine zone both located in the same part of South Australia.

== Extent ==
The Limestone Coast is a South Australian Government Region which consists of land within the following local government areas located in the south east of the state: the City of Mount Gambier and the District Councils of Grant, Kingston, Robe, Tatiara and Naracoorte Lucindale and the Wattle Range Council, and the extent of "coastal waters" up to three nautical miles seaward of the low water mark between the border with Victoria in the east and the northern boundary of the Kingston District Council in the north-west.

=== Industry regions with the same name ===
==== Limestone Coast Tourism Region ====
The words 'Limestone Coast' also used in the name of a tourism region which occupies a similar part of South Australia. The tourism region consists of the following local government areas: the City of Mount Gambier, The Coorong District Council, the District Councils of Grant, Kingston, Robe, Tatiara and Naracoorte Lucindale, and the Wattle Range Council.

==== Limestone Coast Wine Zone ====
The words 'Limestone Coast' also used in the name of a wine zone which occupies a similar part of South Australia. The wine zone is the land south of a line located at appropriately 36 degrees 50 minutes south, i.e. in line with Cape Willoughby at the east end of Kangaroo Island. The zone includes the following wine-growing regions: Coonawarra, Mount Benson, Mount Gambier, Padthaway, Robe and Wrattonbully.

== Location and description ==
From the Victoria border to the Younghusband Peninsula this area has been settled since colonisation by mainly European settlers in the 1840s, displacing an indigenous population that had resided in the region for thousands of years. The region currently supports farming, viticulture, forestry and tourism. Towns include Bordertown, Keith, Millicent, Mount Gambier, Penola, and Naracoorte and the coastal resorts of Beachport, Kingston SE and Robe.

Much of the Limestone Coast is low-lying, and was inundated by sea as recently as 2 million years ago. It had previously also been flooded 15–20 million years ago. The plains are lined by rows of low sandhills parallel to the coast, created at times when the coastline was at that level. Prior to European settlement, much of the land between the sandhills was swamp fed by streams and subject to inundation. A network of drains totalling 1450 km has been constructed to channel the water away through the sandhills to the ocean. Important areas of wetland remain including the lakes and lagoons such as the southern end of the Coorong and Bool Lagoon. Meanwhile, areas of upland in the Limestone Coast include the volcanic craters of Mount Gambier.

The Mediterranean climate of this coast is cool and moist with wet winters.

== History ==
There are deep limestone deposits created from the coral and other sealife. The limestone in Victoria Fossil Cave and the other Naracoorte Caves contains are Australia's biggest source of fossils and a World Heritage Site.

== Ecology ==
=== Flora ===
The natural vegetation was woodland of river red gum and other eucalyptus trees.

=== Fauna ===
Although there are few purely endemic species the coast is rich in wildlife including possums, Cercartetus pygmy possums, Petaurus gliding possums, and other marsupials many of which do not spread further west than here. Endemic species include reptiles such as the striped legless lizard (Delma impar) and invertebrates like an endemic cave cricket. The Naracoorte caves are occupied by the common bent-wing bat.

The lakes and lagoons are particularly important habitats for waterbirds such as black swan, grey teal, Pacific black duck, and especially the critically endangered orange-bellied parrot (Neophema chrysogaster) which winters here along with many other birds including the red-necked stint (Calidris ruficollis), sharp-tailed sandpiper (Calidris acuminata), and curlew sandpiper (Calidris ferruginea).

Most of the original habitat has been cleared for agriculture and only fragments remain (particularly in areas of wetland) with Coorong National Park and Canunda National Park being the largest areas. Therefore, most indigenous wildlife has also disappeared or been severely reduced in number with introduced species of animals an ongoing threat to that which remains.

== See also ==
- Regions of South Australia
- South Australian Forestry Corporation
- Kanawinka Geopark
