= Trihi, South Australia =

Trihi South Australia
- Coordinates: 37°31′59″S 140°37′35″E
- Population: 519 (shared with other localities) (2011 census)
- Established: 18 December 1997
- Abolished: 26 November 2015
- Postcode(s): 5279
- Time zone: ACST (UTC+9:30)
  - Summer (DST): ACDT (UTC+10:30)
- Location: 343 km (213 mi) SE of Adelaide; 25 km (16 mi) NE of Millicent
- LGA(s): Wattle Range Council
- Region: Limestone Coast
- County: Grey
- State electorate(s): MacKillop (2014 boundaries)
- Federal division(s): Barker (2011 boundaries)
Suburbs around Trihi:
Wattle Range	Wattle Range East	Monbulla
Wattle Range; Mount Burr	Trihi	Moerlong; Kalangadoo
Mount McIntyre	Kalangadoo; Mount McIntyre	Kalangadoo
- Footnotes: Adjoining localities as of 26 November 2015; Locations

Trihi is a former locality in the Australian state of South Australia located in the state's south east about 343 kilometres (213 mi) south-east of the state capital of Adelaide and about 25 kilometres (16 mi) north-east of the municipal seat in Millicent.

Trihi was assigned a locality name under the Geographical Names Act 1991 in 1997 with revised boundaries being gazetted in 2001. It was named after Trihi Lagoon. It was abolished on 26 November 2015 and the land within was divided between the localities of Kalangadoo and Mount McIntyre.

The 2011 Australian Census which was conducted in August 2011 and which was the last conducted for Trihi before its abolition reports that it shared a population of 519 people with other localities in the area described as the State Suburb of Kalangadoo by the Australian Bureau of Statistics. However, another source suggests a population as low as a "dozen or so families".

At the time of its abolition, Trihi was located within the federal division of Barker, the state electoral district of MacKillop and the local government area of the Wattle Range Council.
