= Hundred of Hindmarsh =

Hindmarsh
- Cadastral division
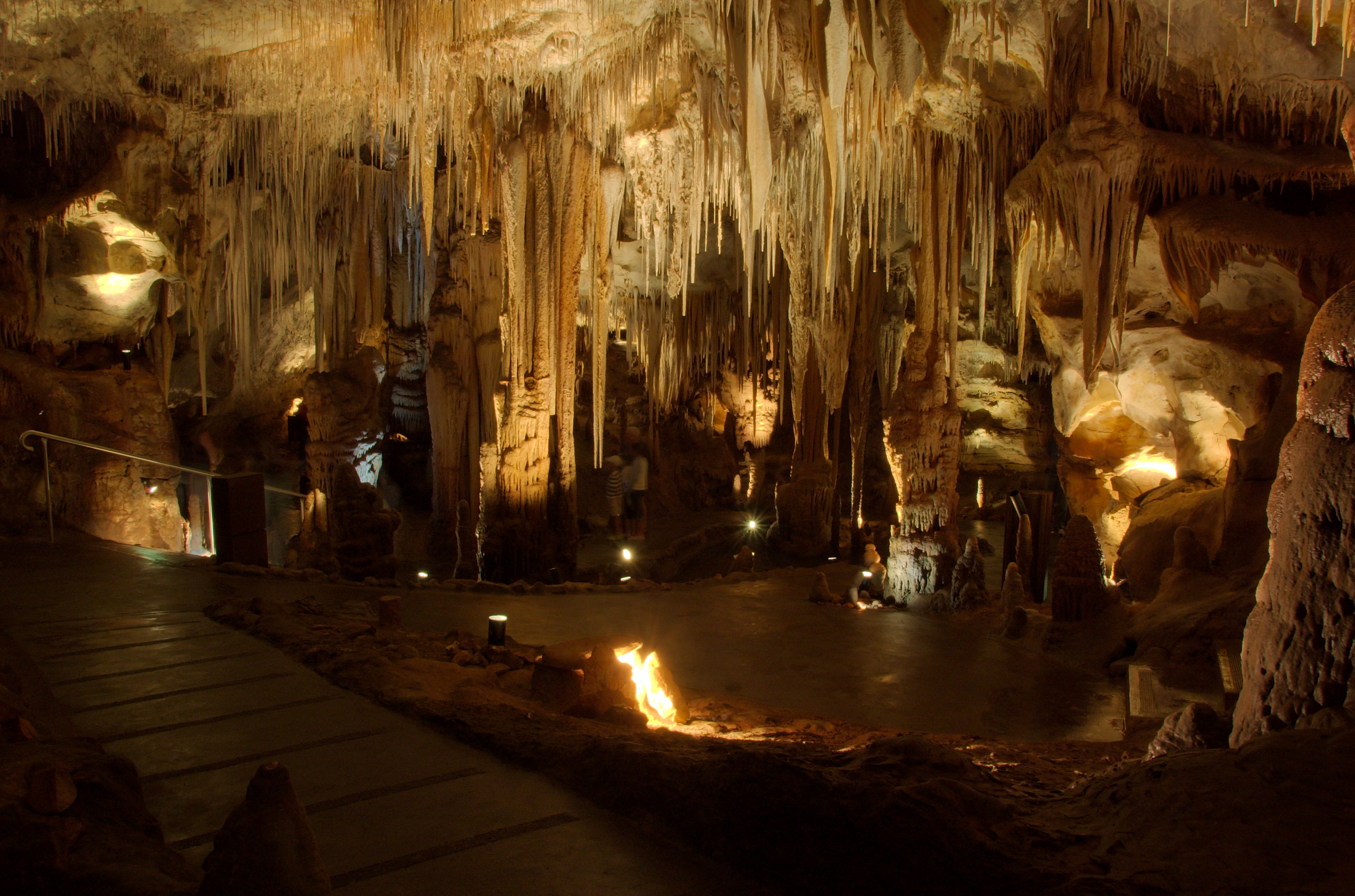
- Dolomite formations in Tantanoola Caves in the south of the hundred

- Coordinates: 37.68°S 140.52°E
- Country: Australia
- State: South Australia
- Established: 1 April 1858

Area
  - Total: 250 km^{2} (98 sq mi)
- County: Grey
Lands administrative divisions around Hindmarsh
Mount Muirhead	Riddoch	Grey
Mayurra	Hindmarsh	Young
Benara	Benara	Blanche

The Hundred of Hindmarsh is a cadastral unit of hundred covering much of the locality of Tantanoola, South Australia, including the township. It is one of the 21 hundreds of the County of Grey located within the former Tantanoola Drainage District. Parts of the localities of Burrungule, Glencoe, Koorine and Mount McIntyre are also within the hundred. It was named in 1858 by Governor Richard Graves MacDonnell after former governor John Hindmarsh.

== Local government ==
The District Council of Tantanoola was established out of the Tantanoola Drainage District in 1888, bringing local government to the hundred for the first time. Tantanoola council was amalgamated into the District Council of Millicent circa 1950s. It ultimately became part of Wattle Range Council when Millicent was amalgamated with its neighbouring local councils in 1997.

== See also ==
- Lands administrative divisions of South Australia
