= Suttontown, South Australia =

Suttontown Mount Gambier, South Australia
- Coordinates: 37°48′14″S 140°46′26″E
- Population: 692 (SAL 2021)
- LGA(s): District Council of Grant; City of Mount Gambier
- Region: Limestone Coast
- County: Grey
- State electorate(s): Mount Gambier
- Federal division(s): Barker
Suburbs around Suttontown:
Wandilo	Wandilo	Mingbool
Compton	Suttontown	Mil-Lel
Compton	Mount Gambier	Worrolong
- Footnotes: Adjoining localities

Suttontown (originally Sutton Town) is a north-western suburb of Mount Gambier, a city in the south-east of South Australia.

Boundaries for the suburb were created in February 1999 for the “long established name.” It was originally a private subdivision of sections 259 and 265 of the Hundred of Blanche, which were adjacent to the Wandilo and Wireless W roads level crossing of the Kalangadoo railway line.

The dwelling known as ‘Pine Hall’ is listed as a state heritage place on the South Australian Heritage Register.

Suttontown is located within the federal division of Barker, the state Electoral district of Mount Gambier and the local government areas of the District Council of Grant and the City of Mount Gambier.
