= Hundred of Mayurra =

- Cadastral division
- Coordinates: 37.68°S 140.35°E
- Country: Australia
- State: South Australia
- Region: Limestone Coast
- LGA(s): Wattle Range Council
- Established: July 15, 1869

Area
  - Total: 240 km^{2} (93 sq mi)
- County: County of Grey
- Hundred: Mayurra
Lands administrative divisions around Hundred of Mayurra
| Hundred of Rivoli Bay | Hundred of Mount Muirhead | Hundred of Riddoch |
| Southern Ocean | Hundred of Mayurra | Hundred of Hindmarsh |
| | Hundred of Benara |

The Hundred of Mayurra is a cadastral division of the County of Grey in southeastern South Australia. It was named on 15 July 1869 for an Aboriginal word meaning fern straws.

There are no significant towns in the Hundred of Mayurra. It is south of the town of Millicent, west of Tantanoola and extends to the coast. It includes the central part of the locality of Canunda along with parts of the localities of Millicent, Tantanoola and German Flat. It includes part of Canunda National Park and the northern part of Lake Bonney SE.

The Lake Bonney Wind Farm, Canunda Wind Farm and Snuggery Power Station are in the Hundred of Mayurra. The wind farms are both on the Woakwine Range which runs parallel to the coast.

The historic Drainage District of Mayurra (established 1882) was centred in the north of the hundred and formed the basis of the early local government body, the District Council of Mayurra, later renamed to Millicent.
