= Eucalyptus × kalangadooensis =

Scientific classification
- Kingdom: Plantae
- Clade: Tracheophytes
- Clade: Angiosperms
- Clade: Eudicots
- Clade: Rosids
- Order: Myrtales
- Family: Myrtaceae
- Genus: Eucalyptus
- Species: E. × kalangadooensis

Binomial name
- Eucalyptus × kalangadooensis Maiden & Blakely

Species of eucalyptus

Eucalyptus × kalangadooensis is a species of tree that is endemic to a small area in South Australia. It has smooth bark, lance-shaped adult leaves, flower buds in groups of between four and ten and top-shaped fruit. It is thought to be a hybrid between E. camaldulensis subsp. camaldulensis and either E. ovata or E. viminalis subsp. cygnetensis.

== Description ==
Eucalyptus × kalangadooensis is a tall tree with smooth bark. The leaves on young plants and on coppice regrowth are glossy green on both sides, broadly-shaped, up to 80 mm (3 in) long, 40–50 mm (2–2 in) wide and have a short petiole. Adult leaves are lance-shaped, glossy green on both sides, 80–140 mm (3–6 in) long and 15–30 mm (0.6–1 in) wide and have a petiole. The flower buds are arranged in leaf axils in groups of between four and ten on a peduncle 10–15 mm (0.4–0.6 in) long, the individual flowers on a short pedicel. The mature buds are top-shaped, 10–12 mm (0.39–0.47 in) long and 5–7 mm (0.20–0.28 in) wide with a beak-shaped operculum about the same length as the floral cup. The fruit is a top-shaped capsule, about 10 mm (0.39 in) long and 7–8 mm (0.28–0.31 in) wide with the valves protruding above the rim.

The Australian Plant Census lists this species as a natural hybrid between E. camaldulensis subsp. camaldulensis and either E. ovata or E. viminalis subsp. cygnetensis.

== Taxonomy and naming ==
Eucalyptus × kalangadooensis was first formally described in 1925 by Joseph Maiden and William Blakely in Journal and Proceedings of the Royal Society of New South Wales.

== Distribution and habitat ==
This eucalypt is only known from near Kalangadoo and Mount Burr.

== See also ==
- List of Eucalyptus species
