= Glencoe, South Australia =

Glencoe South Australia
- Coordinates: 37°41′0″S 140°36′0″E
- Population: 633 (SAL 2021)
- Established: 1844
- Postcode(s): 5291
- Elevation: 102 m (335 ft)
- Area: 45 km^{2} (17.4 sq mi)
- Time zone: ACST (UTC+9:30)
  - Summer (DST): ACDT (UTC+10:30)
- Location: 434 km (270 mi) from Adelaide; 484 km (301 mi) from Melbourne
- LGA(s): Wattle Range Council
- Region: Limestone Coast
- County: Grey
- State electorate(s): MacKillop
- Federal division(s): Barker
Mean max temp	Mean min temp	Annual rainfall
18.9 °C; 66 °F	8.1 °C; 47 °F	850 mm 33.5 in
Localities around Glencoe:
Mount McIntyre	Koorine	Wepar
Tantanoola	Glencoe	Dismal Swamp
	Burrungule	Wandilo, Mount Gambier

Glencoe is a town in South Australia, Australia, located 27 kilometres (17 mi) north-west of Mount Gambier.

== History ==
=== Establishment ===
On 6 March 1844, Tasmanian pastoralists Edward Leake and Robert Leake established Glencoe as a sheep station covering 53,000 acres (21,000 ha). They brought with them Saxon Merino sheep, cattle, and broke horses nearby at Lake Leake establishing the Inverary run with Adam Lindsay Gordon.

In acquiring the land, the Leake brothers soon came into conflict with the local Aboriginal people, killing one or two in a skirmish in late 1844. In 1845, Leake with six other armed horsemen gave battle to a group of around 200 Aboriginal people who had taken a large number of sheep, and dispersed them after a couple of shots. The Chief Protector of Aborigines reported in 1845 that thirty employees at Glencoe had public copulation in the presence of each other with two native females, while an Aboriginal man was shot there.

On the death of Robert in 1860, his brother Edward inherited Glencoe Station, and continued to build the Glencoe Woolshed in 1863. Edward died in 1867. Letitia Leake sold the station to John Riddoch and George Riddoch, who later divided the property between themselves. When the Riddoch brothers dissolved their partnership in 1898, George took the northern half, which he named "Koorine". John broke up his portion for closer settlement.

=== Governance ===
In 1846, the cadastral unit County of Grey, and subsequent Hundred of Young was proclaimed by the then Governor Frederick Robe. Glencoe was annexed by the since amalgamated District Council of Mount Gambier West in 1888 by the enactment of the District Councils Act 1887, a statewide legislative push to ensure all settled areas of the state be under local governance. The former District Council of Tantanoola annexed the settlement from Mount Gambier West by virtue of the Local Government Areas (Re-arrangement) Acts 1929 and 1931, effective from 23 May 1932. The council was subsequently subdivided into Wards named Glencoe East Ward, Glencoe West Ward, Central Ward, and Bridge's Flat Ward.

Glencoe has been a part of the Wattle Range Council local government area since 1997 following an amalgamation between the former District Councils of Beachport, Millicent and Penola.

=== Glencoe Woolshed ===
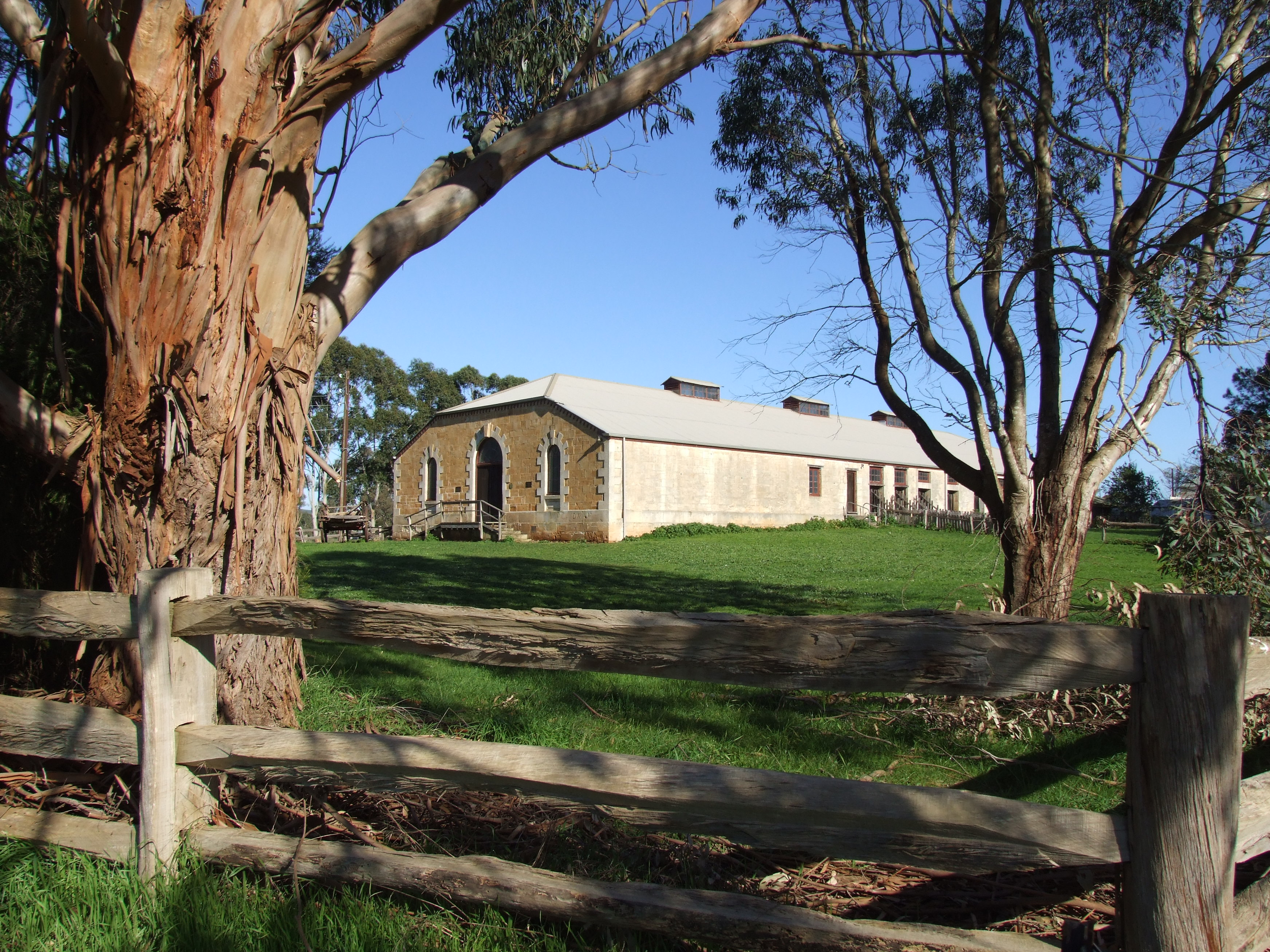
The Glencoe Woolshed has been preserved in its original state

The Glencoe Woolshed is a heritage listed, 36 stand, sheep sheering shed built in 1863 by brothers Edward and Robert Leake. Constructed from local limestone and hand-hewn hardwood timber, it has been maintained in its original condition and now serves as a museum. The shed was not converted to mechanical shears, and remains operational as a blade shearing shed, now hosting shearing exhibitions and guided tours. It is located in the centre of the town, and forms a part of the larger Glencoe Station settlement, including the former homestead, Frontier House, and the Glencoe Station stables and coach-house. The historic Glencoe Woolshed and Glencoe Station Stables and coach-house are listed on the South Australian Heritage Register.

=== Wandilo-Glencoe Railway ===
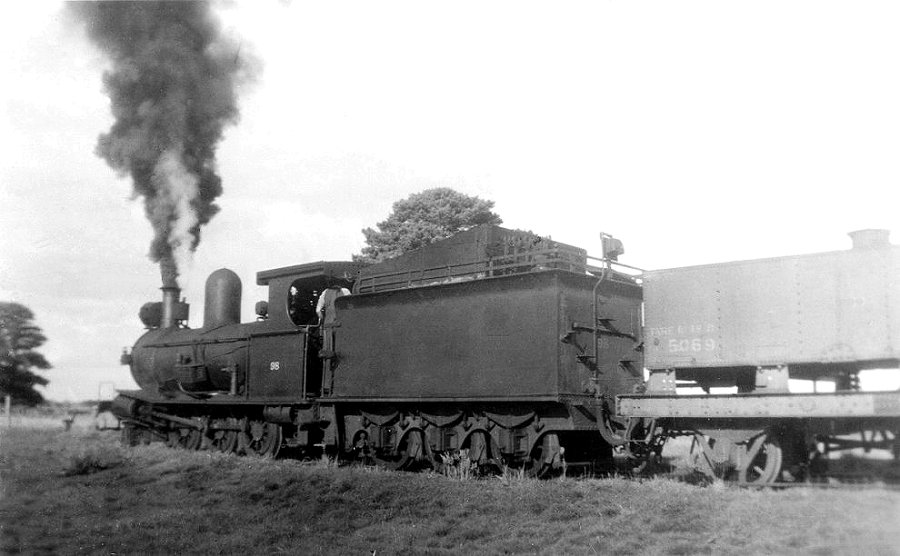
A South Australian Railways Y class locomotive departs Glencoe for the final time in 1957

On 22 August 1904, the 9 miles (14 km), narrow-gauge Wandilo-Glencoe Railway officially began operation. It branched from the Mount Gambier-Naracoorte siding at Wandilo — 8 miles (13 km) north-west of Mount Gambier. The branch was built to service the local agriculture and horticulture industry. The branch was decommissioned in June 1957 when the main line was converted to broad-gauge.

== Etymology ==
The settlement was named in honour of John McIntyre's birthplace, Glen Coe, Scotland. The Aboriginal name for the district was kilap, "deep water".

== Economy ==
Surrounding Glencoe are pine tree plantations used in the production of paper pulp and for the supply to sawmills in the area. Sheep and cattle farming is also a strong part of the economy.

== Education ==
The town has one R-7 primary school and one pre-school, Glencoe Central Primary School and Glencoe & District Kindergarten.

== Sport ==
The single main sporting complex in Glencoe caters for multiple sporting leagues and activities including Australian rules football, cricket, netball and tennis. The facilities include: an oval, shared cricket and football clubrooms, football change rooms, shared tennis and netball clubrooms and change rooms.

The Glencoe Football Club which is a part of the Mid South Eastern Football League has 4 teams; A-Grade, B-Grade, Senior Colts and Junior Colts. Glencoe was also a founding member of the league when it was established in 1936.

== Lake Leake ==
Lake Leake, an extinct volcanic crater associated with the Newer Volcanics Province, formed when rising red-hot molten rock encountered water in the limestone plain. Massive steam-driven explosions blew rock and lava high into the air. Powdered rock (ash)and rocks fell back to form a low rim around a wide flat crater – a part of which remains today. Lake Leake and the nearby Lake Edward, are unique in the Mount Burr Range. They perch above the regions water table and are filled by rainwater and run-off only. Pollen spores collected from lake sediment indicate that the volcanic activity occurred here much earlier than 20,000 years ago.
