= Gower Conservation Park =

Protected area in South Australia

- IUCN category III (natural monument or feature)
- Location within South Australia
- Location: South Australia
- Nearest city: Tantanoola
- Coordinates: 37°42′48″S 140°31′03″E
- Area: 40 ha (99 acres)
- Established: 21 January 1971
- Governing body: Department for Environment and Water

Gower Conservation Park (formerly the Gower National Parks Reserve) is a protected area located in the Australian state of South Australia in the locality of Tantanoola about 353 kilometres (219 mi) south-east of the state capital of Adelaide and about 25 kilometres (16 mi) north west of the regional city of Mount Gambier.

The conservation park occupies land in section 517 of the cadastral unit of the Hundred of Hindmarsh. It was proclaimed as a national park on 21 January 1971 under the National Parks Act 1966 and was given the name of Gower National Parks Reserve. On 27 April 1972, it was renamed as the Gower Conservation Park upon the proclamation of the National Parks and Wildlife Act 1972 which repealed the former act along with other statutes concerned with conservation. As of 2016, it covered an area of 40 hectares (99 acres).

In 1980, it was considered to be significant because it was “an area representative of The eucalypt Forest [sic] which would once have covered much of the lower south east of South Australia”.

In 1990, the conservation park was described as having a landscape of “undulating consolidated calcarenite dunes are overlain by brown/grey, weakly-structured sandy soils” with “some limestone outcrops located in the central and southern parts (of the conservation park) in association with rough barked manna gum”. The vegetation cover was described as “mainly an open forest of messmate stringybark… and brown stringybark… with a shrub understorey of austral bracken… and a sparse shrub layer of spike wattle…, grass tree… and some silver leaved banksia… ” with “a stand of rough barked manna gum and some large black wattle… “ in southern end of the conservation park.

The conservation park is classified as an IUCN Category III protected area. In 1980, it was listed on the now-defunct Register of the National Estate.

== See also ==
- Protected areas of South Australia
