= Calectasia Conservation Park =

Protected area in South Australia

- IUCN category IV (habitat/species management area)
- Location within South Australia
- Location: South Australia, Wattle Range
- Nearest city: Penola
- Coordinates: 37°21′28″S 140°33′03″E
- Area: 14 ha (35 acres)
- Established: 7 September 1967
- Governing body: Department for Environment and Water

Calectasia Conservation Park, formerly the Calectasia National Parks Reserve, is a protected area located in the Australian state of South Australia in the locality of Wattle Range about 320 kilometres (200 mi) south-east of the state capital of Adelaide and about 25 kilometres (16 mi) west of the town of Penola.

The conservation park occupies land in section 157 of the cadastral unit of the Hundred of Short on the southern side of the Robe - Penola Road. The land first acquired protected area status as the Calectasia National Parks Reserve proclaimed on 7 September 1967 under the National Parks Act 1966. On 27 April 1972, it was renamed as the Calectasia Conservation Park upon the proclamation of the National Parks and Wildlife Act 1972 which repealed the former act along with other statutes concerned with conservation. As of 2016, it covered an area of 14 hectares (35 acres).

In 1980, the statement of significance provided for the now-defunct Register of the National Estate states that it “preserves a population of the blue tinsel lily… now rare in South Australia and a small seasonal swamp important for water birds and eastern swamp rats”.

In 1990, the conservation park was described as consisting of a "stranded dune system" remnant divided into two areas by a low-lying area that accounts for about 70% of the conservation park's area and which is “subject to inundation during the wetter months of the year”. The area in the south supports a brown stringybark woodland with an understorey of austral grass tree, the "low-lying area" supports “a dense grassland of mainly introduced species” while the area in the north supports a “low woodland of brown stringybark with large scattered desert banksia… and a dense heath understorey”. The blue tinsel lily grows in the north east part of the conservation park where a protective enclosure has been erected around the main stand of the plant. Additional protection exists for the species in the form of a vermin proof fence to the perimeter of the conservation park.

The conservation park was within the part of the state that was burnt during the Ash Wednesday bushfires in February 1983.

The conservation park is classified as an IUCN Category IV protected area.

== See also ==
- Protected areas of South Australia
