= Penola Conservation Park =

Protected area in South Australia

- IUCN category III (natural monument or feature)
- Location within South Australia
- Location: South Australia, Monbulla
- Nearest city: Penola
- Coordinates: 37°21′20″S 140°41′50″E
- Area: 2.27 km^{2} (0.88 sq mi)
- Established: 19 February 1970
- Governing body: Department for Environment and Water
- Website: Official website

Penola Conservation Park (formerly the Penola National Park) is a protected area located in the Australian state of South Australia in the locality of Monbulla about 329 kilometres (204 mi) south-east of the state capital of Adelaide and about 12 kilometres (7.5 mi) west of the town of Penola.

The conservation park occupies land in sections 255 and 256 of the cadastral unit of the Hundred of Monbulla. It is bounded by roads on three sides - Clay Wells Road (also known as the Robe - Penola road) to the south, Searle Road to the east and Rifle Range Road to the west. A wetland called Green Swamp located in its south-west was described in 1990 as “a semi-permanent wetland of approximately 10 hectares (25 acres)” while in its south-east corner, there is a “small disused quarry”.

It originally acquired protected area status as one of two parcels of land proclaimed as a fauna sanctuary on 19 February 1970 under the Fauna Conservation Act 1964-1965 with the other parcel being located in the Hundred of Penola. On 10 September 1970, Sections 255 and 256 in the Hundred of Monbulla were proclaimed under the National Parks Act 1966 as the Penola National Park. On 27 April 1972, it was renamed as the Penola Conservation Park upon the proclamation of the National Parks and Wildlife Act 1972 which repealed both of the above-mentioned acts along with other statutes concerned with conservation. The land was reported in 1990 as being previously used for grazing on the basis of the condition of the vegetation and the presence of a well at the edge of the Green Swamp. As of 2016, it covered an area of 2.27 square kilometres (0.88 sq mi).

In 1980, the conservation park's listing on the now-defunct Register of the National Estate argued it to be significant for the following reasons:

A fine reserve preserving a range of habitat types representative of the stranded dune and swale terrain of the lower south-east of South Australia. The Park incorporates both dune and swale with associated seasonal swamp. Macropus rufogriseus, Trichosurus vulpecula, Tachylglossus aculeatus and Rattus leutreolus. The diverse avifauna is augmented by a winter influx of waterbirds.

In 1990, the conservation park was described as follows:

…underlain by consolidated calcarenite dunes, overlain with red, weakly structured sandy soils and unconsolidated stranded dunes of bleached sands with a yellow-grey B horizon. Two large wetland areas have a marl base and black organic soils. River red gum flats have sandy, mottled-yellow duplex soil.

In 1990, the following vegetation associations were present:

1. A “woodland or open woodland of brown stringybark” occupied the dunes.
2. A river red gum woodland with an understorey of “annual grasses and herbs and scattered shrubs” was present on “the flats associated with the wetlands”.
3. “Isolated stands” of swamp gum and rough barked manna gum were present on “the edges of the wetter areas”.
4. The north-west of the conservation park which was subject to periodic inundation supported “a large area of low heath”.
5. ”Water-ribbons and yellow marsh flower” were present in the wetlands.

As of 1990, visitation consisted of use “mainly by local residents and schools groups” and “occasional” use for “bush camping”.

The conservation park is classified as an IUCN Category III protected area.

== See also ==
- Protected areas of South Australia
