= Mil-Lel, South Australia =

Mil-Lel South Australia
- Coordinates: 37°46′23″S 140°49′46″E
- Population: 382 (SAL 2021)
- Postcode(s): 5291
- Location: 374 km (232 mi) SE of Adelaide; 7 km (4 mi) NE of Mount Gambier
- LGA(s): District Council of Grant
- Region: Limestone Coast
- County: Grey
- State electorate(s): Mount Gambier
- Federal division(s): Barker
Mean max temp	Mean min temp	Annual rainfall
19.0 °C; 66 °F	8.2 °C; 47 °F	712.4 mm 28 in
Localities around Mil-Lel:
Wandilo	Mingbool	Strathdownie
Suttontown	Mil-Lel	Strathdownie; Mumbannar
Suttontown	Worrolong; Glenburnie	Mumbannar
- Footnotes: Locations; Adjoining localities

Mil-Lel is a northern suburb of Mount Gambier.

The name for this suburb is believed to be a corruption of "Mullel", the name of a nearby waterhole. The name was historically written as two words: "Mil Lel" until the spelling was changed to "Mil-Lel" on 28 May 2009.

Mil Lel Post Office opened on 1 September 1899, was downgraded to a receiving office from October 1910 until being upgraded again on 1 July 1927, and closed on 30 June 1993.

Mil-Lel is located within the federal division of Barker, the state electoral district of Mount Gambier and the local government area of the District Council of Grant. It is also part of Mount Gambier’s urban sprawl.
