= Monbulla, South Australia =

Monbulla
- Town
- Coordinates: 37.396°S 140.724°E
- Country: Australia
- State: South Australia
- LGA: Wattle Range Council
- Location: 10 km (6.2 mi) west of Penola; 330 km (210 mi) southeast of Adelaide

Government
  - State electorate: MacKillop
  - Federal division: Barker

Population
  - Total: 122 (SAL 2021)
- Postcode: 5277
Localities around Monbulla
Maaoupe		Coonawarra
Wattle Range East	Monbulla	Penola
Kalangadoo	Moerlong, Krongart	Nangwarry

Monbulla is a locality in the Limestone Coast region of South Australia. It is west of Penola and occupies the eastern part of the Hundred of Monbulla. There is no town centre, and the locality population was 122 at the 2021 census. Monbulla school opened in 1894 but has now closed.

The locality includes the Penola Conservation Park on its western edge. It is crossed by the roads connecting Penola to Clay Wells (towards Robe), Mount Burr (towards Millicent) and Kalangadoo. The Ladbroke Grove Power Station is near the southeastern corner of the locality.
