= Hundred of Mount Muirhead =

- Cadastral division
- Coordinates: 37.528°S 140.333°E
- Country: Australia
- State: South Australia
- Region: Limestone Coast
- LGA(s): Wattle Range Council
- Established: July 15, 1869

Area
  - Total: 260 km^{2} (101 sq mi)
- County: County of Grey
- Hundred: Mount Muirhead
Lands administrative divisions around Hundred of Mount Muirhead
Symon	Kennion	Short
Rivoli Bay	Mount Muirhead	Riddoch
Mayurra	Mayurra	Hindmarsh

The Hundred of Mount Muirhead is a cadastral division of the County of Grey in southeastern South Australia. It was named on 15 July 1869 for the geographical feature of the same name which, in turn, was named by Charles Bonney for one of his stockmen.

Two townships lie within the hundred—Millicent and Hatherleigh along with the localities of Sebastopol and Rocky Camp. Parts of Rendelsham, Furner, Canunda and Mount Burr localities also overlap the hundred. The hundred includes the northern part of Canunda National Park.

== Local government ==
The historic Drainage District of Mount Muirhead and Drainage District of Mayurra (established 1882) were located in the vicinity of the hundred. The Mayurra district formed the basis of the early local government body, the District Council of Mayurra, later renamed to Millicent, and likewise Mount Muirhead to the north formed the basis for the District Council of Mount Muirhead (both established in 1888). Mount Muirhead district was amalgamated into Millicent district in 1914, bringing the whole hundred under a single local government for the first time. Millicent was amalgamated with Beachport and Penola councils in 1997 to form the much larger Wattle Range Council but the council seat remained at Millicent.
