= Telford Scrub Conservation Park =

Protected area in South Australia

- IUCN category III (natural monument or feature)
- Location within South Australia
- Location: South Australia
- Nearest city: Mount Gambier
- Coordinates: 37.6969°S 140.7864°E
- Area: 1.7 km^{2} (0.66 sq mi)
- Established: 12 March 1987
- Governing body: Department for Environment and Water
- Website: Official website

Telford Scrub Conservation Park is a protected area in the Australian state of South Australia located in the state's Limestone Coast in the gazetted locality of Dismal Swamp about 14 kilometres (8.7 mi) north of the city centre in Mount Gambier.

The conservation park occupies land in section 134 of the cadastral unit of the Hundred of Young to the west of the Riddoch Highway. It is bounded by Grundys Lane to the south with access for visitors provided by a 5 metres (16 ft) wide vehicle track to the inside of its boundaries. In 1992, it was bounded on three sides by land using for grazing while the land south of Grundy Lane was used as a pine plantation. A facility known as the Pine Lodge Holiday Camp is located to the immediate east of its north eastern corner. Its name is derived from the former owners, the Telford family.

The conservation park was proclaimed on 12 March 1987 with access permitted for the purpose of petroleum exploration under the Petroleum Act 1940. As of July 2016, the conservation park covered an area of 1.7 square kilometres (0.66 sq mi).

In 1992, the conservation park was described as consisting of “a series of sand ridges overlying limestone, giving way to low lying wetlands in the southern and eastern sections”. It supports the following major vegetation associations:

1. an “open woodland” of brown stringybark
2. an association which covers most of the conservation park and consists of an “open woodland” of brown stringybark and rough barked manna gum with isolated stands of blackwood, silver banksia and native box over an understorey of bracken
3. an association which dominates the southern end of the conservation park and consists of an “open woodland” of swamp gum with an understorey consisting of heath tea-tree, bottlebrush tea-tree, sword-sedge and rushes
4. a “low open shrubland dominated by tea-tree …, heath tea-tree …, sedges … and rushes …”

The conservation park was also reported in 1992 as having a “rich faunal population including a population of short-nosed bandicoot”.

As of 1992, visitors to the conservation park consisted of “local residents, school groups, and guests at Pine Lodge Holiday Camp”.

The conservation park is classified as an IUCN Category III protected area.

== See also ==
- Protected areas of South Australia
