= Wandilo, South Australia =

Wandilo South Australia
- Coordinates: 37.7259°S 140.72571°E
- Population: 194 (SAL 2021)
- Postcode(s): 5291
- Elevation: 66 m (217 ft)
- Location: 12 km (7 mi) north of Mount Gambier
- Region: Limestone Coast
- County: Grey
- State electorate(s): Mount Gambier
- Federal division(s): Barker
Mean max temp	Mean min temp	Annual rainfall
19.0 °C; 66 °F	8.2 °C; 47 °F	712.4 mm 28 in
Localities around Wandilo:
Glencoe	Dismal Swamp
Burrungule	Wandilo	Mingbool
Compton	Suttontown	Mil-lel

Wandilo is a north-western suburb of Mount Gambier in the Australian state of South Australia. It was named after the railway station on the Mount Gambier railway line, and is recorded to mean "a swamp where native companions resort".

Wandilo was a junction on the railway line, 8 miles (13 km) north of Mount Gambier, with a branch line to Glencoe constructed in 1904, until it was decommissioned in 1959 then along with the Wolseley line to freight on 12 April 1995 and tourist services 1 July 2006.

Mount Gambier Airport is located in this suburb.

Wandilo is located within the federal division of Barker, the state electoral district of Mount Gambier and the local government area of the District Council of Grant. It is also part of Mount Gambier's urban sprawl.

== See also ==
- Mount Gambier Airport
- Wandilo bushfire
