= Pleasant Park =

Pleasant Park may refer to:

- Pleasant Park, Ontario, Canada
- Pleasant Park station, Ottawa, Canada
- Pleasant Park Public School, Ottawa, Canada
- Pleasant Park, South Australia in the Hundred of Mingbool, South Australia
- A park in Apex, North Carolina
- A locale in the video game Fortnite Battle Royale

== See also ==
- Point Pleasant Park
- SS Point Pleasant Park
