= Flight 904 =

Flight 904 may refer to

- Whyalla Airlines Flight 904, crashed on 31 May 2000
- Kam Air Flight 904, crashed on 3 February 2005
- Lion Air Flight 904, crashed on 13 April 2013
