= Burrungule, South Australia =

Burrungule South Australia
- Coordinates: 37°46′56″S 140°34′21″E
- Population: 115 (SAL 2021)
- Elevation: 29 m (95 ft)
- Time zone: ACST (UTC+9:30)
  - Summer (DST): ACST (UTC+10:30)
- LGA(s): District Council of Grant; Wattle Range Council
- Region: Limestone Coast
- County: Grey
- State electorate(s): Mount Gambier
- Federal division(s): Barker
Localities around Burrungule:
Tantanoola	Glencoe	Glencoe
Tantanoola; German Creek	Burrungule	Wandilo; Compton
German Creek	Kongorong	Moorak
- Footnotes: Adjoining localities

Burrungule is a locality in South Australia.

Most of the locality is in the District Council of Grant, however the northernpart is in the Wattle Range Council. It is traversed by both the Princes Highway and the former Mount Gambier-Beachport railway line which closed to freight in April 1995 and tourist services 1 July 2006.

The locality derives its name from the former railway siding. In turn, the siding derived its name from an Aboriginal word for currant bush, also the name of a legendary hero.
