= Wandilo Bushfire =

1958 bushfire in South Australia

- Date: 5 April 1958
- Location: Wandilo, South Australia

Impacts
- Deaths: 8
- Injuries: 3

The Wandilo Bushfire took place on 5 April 1958 at Wandilo, South Australia. The bushfires claimed 8 lives at a pine plantation near Wandilo in the South East of South Australia after a dry autumn.

The eight fatalities were all employees of a state government department involved in fighting the fire with three others surviving. Fire trucks had been sent to fight the fire in the morning but were trapped following a sudden and dramatic change in wind direction.

Two of the trucks became bogged leaving their crews unable to escape. Vaporising of fuel lines and the absence of two way radios also hindered the attempt of the men to fight the fire highlighting the need for improved equipment.

An inquiry by the state coroner did not make a finding as to the cause of the fire.
