= Ladbroke Grove Power Station =

- Country: Australia
- Location: Monbulla, South Australia
- Coordinates: 37°27′23.1″S 140°46′56″E
- Status: Operational
- Construction began: 1998
- Commission date: 2000
- Owner: Origin Energy
- Operator: Origin Energy

Thermal power station
- Primary fuel: Natural gas
- Turbine technology: Gas turbine

Power generation
- Units operational: 2
- Make and model: Alstom Australia
- Nameplate capacity: 80 MW

Ladbroke Grove Power Station is a gas-fired power station in the locality of Monbulla near Penola in the Limestone Coast region of South Australia. It was built by Boral Limited in 2000. It is now owned by Origin Energy.

The power station was originally built with a generating capacity of 40 MW, and now has a generating capacity of 80 MW. It is used as a peaking power plant.

Ladbroke Grove power station was built next to the Katnook gas processing plant, which processed gas extracted from the Katnook Gas Field in the western Otway Basin. Originally, Ladbroke Grove used gas processed next door. When the wells in the field were becoming depleted, a branch from the SEAGas pipeline was built to the Katnook plant, and gas from that pipeline, drawn from further east in the Otway Basin, now fuels the power station.
