= German Creek, South Australia =

German Creek
- Town
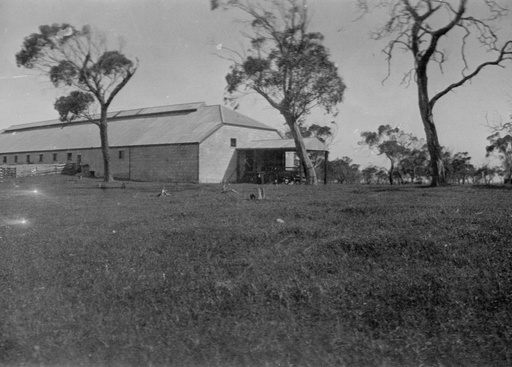
- Coola Shearing Shed, State Library of South Australia B 3393

- Coordinates: 37.828270°S 140.482310°E
- Country: Australia
- State: South Australia
- Region: Limestone Coast
- LGA: District Council of Grant

Government
  - State electorate: Mount Gambier
  - Federal division: Barker

Population
  - Total: 25 (SAL 2021)
- Postcode: 5291
- County: County of Grey
Localities around German Creek
| German Flat | Tantanoola | Burrungule |
| German Flat | German Creek | Burrungule |
| Carpenter Rocks | Kongorong | Kongorong |
- Coordinates; Adjoining localities

German Creek, formerly known as Benara Creek, is a rural locality in south-eastern South Australia, situated in the District Council of Grant. The boundaries were formalised in October 1995 for the long established name. The postcode was originally 5280, but was altered to 5291 in 2004. It was reportedly named for a German who was shepherding in the area.

== History ==
The German Creek area was offered to the government for closer settlement purposes in 1911; however, while the government purchased the nearby Moorak estate, it declined to purchase land at German Creek, and the area was privately subdivided.

It was renamed Benara Creek in 1918, one of many German-themed named places in South Australia to be renamed during World War I; however, it reverted to its original name in 1986. It still to this day still remains "German Creek"

== Geography and Climate ==
German Creek is located within the federal division of Barker, the state electoral district of Mount Gambier and the local government area of the District Council of Grant. The principal land use at German Creek is primary production.

The Coola Shearing Shed has been listed as a state heritage place on the South Australian Heritage Register.

German Creek has a Warm-Summer Mediterranean climate abbreviated csb on the Köppen-Scale.

Climate data for German Creek
| Month | Jan | Feb | Mar | Apr | May | Jun | Jul | Aug | Sep | Oct | Nov | Dec | Year |
|---|---|---|---|---|---|---|---|---|---|---|---|---|---|
| Mean daily maximum °C (°F) | 26.0 (78.8) | 26.0 (78.8) | 24.6 (76.3) | 20.8 (69.4) | 17.0 (62.6) | 14.0 (57.2) | 14.0 (57.2) | 15.0 (59.0) | 17.0 (62.6) | 19.0 (66.2) | 22.0 (71.6) | 24.0 (75.2) | 20.0 (67.9) |
| Mean daily minimum °C (°F) | 10.0 (50.0) | 11.0 (51.8) | 10.0 (50.0) | 8.0 (46.4) | 7.0 (44.6) | 5.0 (41.0) | 5.0 (41.0) | 5.0 (41.0) | 6.0 (42.8) | 6.0 (42.8) | 8.0 (46.4) | 9.0 (48.2) | 7.5 (45.5) |
| Average rainfall mm (inches) | 27.4 (1.08) | 21.4 (0.84) | 34.4 (1.35) | 46.4 (1.83) | 64.2 (2.53) | 86.4 (3.40) | 95.3 (3.75) | 96.0 (3.78) | 69.2 (2.72) | 52.8 (2.08) | 38.9 (1.53) | 37.2 (1.46) | 669.6 (26.35) |
| Average rainy days | 4 | 2 | 4 | 7 | 9 | 12 | 13 | 14 | 11 | 8 | 6 | 5 | 95 |
Source: NOAA.
