= Tarpeena, South Australia =

Tarpeena South Australia
- Coordinates: 37°37′44″S 140°47′41″E
- Population: 329 (UCL 2021)
- Established: 1860 (town); 25 February 1999 (locality)
- Postcode(s): 5277
- Elevation: 112 m (367 ft)
- LGA(s): District Council of Grant
- Region: Limestone Coast
- County: Grey
- State electorate(s): Mount Gambier
- Federal division(s): Barker
Mean max temp	Mean min temp	Annual rainfall
19.0 °C; 66 °F	8.2 °C; 47 °F	712.4 mm 28 in
Localities around Tarpeena:
Wepar	Wepar; Nangwarry	Nangwarry
Wepar	Tarpeena	Pleasant Park; Mingbool
Dismal Swamp	Dismal Swamp; Mingbool	Mingbool
- Footnotes: Adjoining localities

Tarpeena is a town and a locality on the Riddoch Highway between Penola and Mount Gambier in the Limestone Coast region of South Australia.

The town was named by Governor MacDonnell, after the aboriginal words tart pena which means red gum tree. The town was surveyed in October 1860. Boundaries for the locality were created on 25 February 1999.

== Industry ==
Pastoralists entered the area in the 1840s and soon established sheep stations for wool. With the improvement in transport and the road system Tarpeena has become largely a dormitory suburb of the regional centre of Mount Gambier but the timber mill is still a valuable part of the infrastructure and helps the post office remain viable with the trade generated from over 700 employees.

== Governance ==
Tarpeena is located within the federal division of Barker, the state electoral district of Mount Gambier and the local government area of the District Council of Grant.

== Education ==
After 106 years, the primary school in Tarpeena closed in 2011 due to diminished enrolment.
