= Mount McIntyre, South Australia =

Mount McIntyre
- Suburb
- Coordinates: 37°33′39″S 140°32′14″E
- Country: Australia
- State: South Australia
- Region: Limestone Coast
- LGA: Wattle Range Council
- Location: 338 km (210 mi) SE of Adelaide; 16 km (9.9 mi) W of Millicent
- Established: 23 February 1995

Government
  - State electorate: MacKillop
  - Federal division: Barker

Population
  - Total: 70 (SAL 2016)
- Time zone: UTC+9:30 (ACST)
  - Summer (DST): UTC+10:30 (ACST)
- Postcode: 5279
- County: Grey
- Mean max temp: 19.0 °C (66.2 °F)
- Mean min temp: 8.2 °C (46.8 °F)
- Annual rainfall: 712.4 mm (28.05 in)
Suburbs around Mount McIntyre
Wattle Range	Wattle Range East	Wattle Range East
Wattle Range East; Mount Burr; Tantanoola	Mount McIntyre	Kalangadoo; Koorine
Tantanoola	Tantanoola; Glencoe; Koorine	Koorine
- Locations; Adjoining localities

Mount McIntyre is a locality in the Australian state of South Australia located in the state's south-east about 388 kilometres (241 mi) south-east of the state capital of Adelaide and about 16 kilometres (9.9 mi) east of the municipal seat in Millicent.

Mount McIntyre's boundaries were created on 23 February 1995 for the part within the then District Council of Millicent and on 18 December 1997 within the then District Council of Beachport. Land from the former locality of Trihi was added on 26 November 2015. The locality was given the ”long established name” which is derived from Mount McIntyre, a hill located within its boundaries.

Land use within Mount McIntyre is zoned as primary production.

Mount McIntyre is located within the federal division of Barker, the state electoral district of MacKillop and the local government area of the Wattle Range Council.
