= O'Connor Airlines =

IATA	ICAO	Call sign
UQ	OCM	OCONNOR
- Founded: 1973
- Ceased operations: 14 December 2007
- Hubs: Mount Gambier
- Focus cities: Adelaide
- Frequent-flyer program: Qantas Frequent Flyer
- Alliance: Oneworld
- Fleet size: 2 (March 2017)
- Headquarters: Mount Gambier
- Website: www.oconnorairlines.com.au

O'Connor Airlines was an airline based in Mount Gambier, South Australia. It operated scheduled services from Mount Gambier to destinations in South Australia and Victoria. Its main base was Mount Gambier Airport, with a hub at Adelaide Airport, which serviced Mildura Airport and Port Augusta Airport. The airline also serviced Whyalla Airport until September 2007.

== History ==
The airline was established and started operations in 1973. Beginning as a one-aeroplane flight school in South Australia, O'Connor Airlines developed, over some years, into a freight and passenger service flying to 18 regional and country centres across the state. This was to change when it lost the freight contact. It subsequently relaunched itself, rebasing in Mount Gambier, and began services from that city to Adelaide and Melbourne. The IATA Code OL was used up to 1990. It then started flying to Whyalla. It began to service Mildura in 1998, purchasing a QantasLink route. In 2006, after Airlines of South Australia ceased operations, it began flying from Adelaide to Port Augusta.

The airline used Qantas facilities at both Adelaide and Melbourne airports. Originally, it used those of Australian Airlines.

In November 2007 O'Connor Airline was placed into voluntary administration with debts of between $4–5m AUD. This was largely blamed on high maintenance costs and high competition. Administrator McGrathNicol was at the time looking for a buyer of the service.

O'Connor Airlines ceased operations on 14 December 2007 after its administrators were unable to find a buyer willing to purchase the airline as a going concern. On 21 February 2008, the airline's creditors voted for a pooled Deed of Company Arrangement (DoCA) for the airline group to be broken up and then commence trading again under new ownership. Many of the assets were subsequently purchased by Mount Gambier businessman Adrian de Bruin, including the Air Operator's Certificate, and used to establish de Bruin Air.

== Destinations ==
- South Australia
  - Adelaide Airport
  - Port Augusta Airport
  - Mount Gambier Airport
  - Whyalla Airport
- Victoria
  - Mildura Airport
  - Melbourne Airport
- O'Connor flew to Renmark for a brief period in 2001. During 2000 the airline carried 41,732 passengers.

Melbourne services ceased 1 July 2007 and Whyalla services ceased 3 September 2007

== Fleet ==
The O'Connor Airlines fleet consisted of the following aircraft (at March 2007):

- 2 BAe Jetstream 32
