= Nangwarry =

- Town
- Coordinates: 37°32′37″S 140°48′56″E
- Country: Australia
- State: South Australia
- Region: Limestone Coast
- LGA: Wattle Range Council
- Location: 352 km (219 mi) SE of Adelaide; 32 km (20 mi) N of Mount Gambier; 19 km (12 mi) S of Penola
- Established: 17 October 1974 (town); 13 December 2001 (locality)

Government
  - State electorate: Mount Gambier
  - Federal division: Barker
- Time zone: UTC+9:30 (ACST)
  - Summer (DST): UTC+10:30 (ACST)
- Postcode: 5277
- County: Grey
- Mean max temp: 19.0 °C (66.2 °F)
- Mean min temp: 8.2 °C (46.8 °F)
- Annual rainfall: 712.4 mm (28.05 in)
Localities around Nangwarry
| Monbulla | Penola | Lake Mundi, Victoria |
| Krongart; Kalangadoo; Wepar | Nangwarry | Lake Mundi, Victoria; Lindsay, Victoria |
| Tarpeena | Tarpeena; Pleasant Park | Lindsay, Victoria |
- Locations; Adjoining localities

Nangwarry is a town and a locality in the Australian state of South Australia located about 352 kilometres (219 mi) south-east of the state capital of Adelaide and about 32 kilometres (20 mi) north-west of the regional centre of Mount Gambier.

The Town of Nangwarry was proclaimed under the Crown Lands Act 1929 on 17 October 1974. The boundaries for the locality were proclaimed on 13 December 2001 which include the extent of the Town of Nangwarry and which align with the boundaries of the cadastral unit of the Hundred of Nangwarry. The locality was given the "long established name".

Nangwarry has a petrol station, a general store, bottle shop, post office, timber mill, and a museum. And a football / netball team known as the Nangwarry Saints, who play in the Mid South Eastern Football League.

Nangwarry is located within the federal division of Barker, the state electoral district of Mount Gambier and the local government area of the Wattle Range Council.
