= Hundred of Mingbool =

- Cadastral division
- Coordinates: 37.682°S 140.879°E
- Country: Australia
- State: South Australia
- Region: Limestone Coast
- LGA(s): District Council of Grant
- Established: October 24, 1867

Area
  - Total: 250 km^{2} (97 sq mi)
- County: County of Grey
- Hundred: Mingbool
Lands administrative divisions around Hundred of Mingbool
Grey	Nangwarry	Victoria
Young	Mingbool	Victoria
Blanche	Gambier	Victoria

The Hundred of Mingbool is a cadastral division of the County of Grey in southeastern South Australia. It was named on 24 October 1867, after an indigenous phrase of unknown meaning.

The township of Tarpeena is in the north-western corner of the hundred, with the locality of Mingbool occupying the heart of the hundred and Pleasant Park the northeast.
