= District Council of Mount Muirhead =

District Council of Mount Muirhead South Australia
- Coordinates: 37°35′31″S 140°20′38″E
- Established: 1888
- Abolished: 1914
LGAs around District Council of Mount Muirhead:
		Kennion
Beachport	Mount Muirhead	Kennion
Mayurra/Millicent	Mayurra/Millicent	Tantanoola

The District Council of Mount Muirhead was a local government area in South Australia from 1888 to 1914.

== History ==
According to South Australian local government historian Sue Marsden "development of South Australia's South East was greatly helped by drainage schemes. Elsewhere in South Australia the Local Board of Main Roads was the precursor to local government, but in the South East it was district drainage boards."

The original South-East Drainage District was formed in April 1876. Part of this district and part of the Tantanoola Drainage District within the vicinity of the Hundred of Mount Muirhead were split off later in 1876 to form a new drainage district called Mount Muirhead Drainage District. In 1879 the Mount Muirhead district was expanded to include more of the South-East district. On 27 April 1882 both the Mount Muirhead and South-East districts were dissolved and a new (second) Mount Muirhead Drainage District was established along with the new drainage district of Mayurra.

The District Council of Mount Muirhead was established in 1888 by the enactment of the District Councils Act 1887, a statewide legislative push to ensure all settled areas of the state be under local governance. It stated that all existing drainage districts (and the accompanying drainage boards) were to effectively become district councils.

On 4 June 1914, Mount Muirhead district was annexed by the District Council of Millicent. The enlarged council area was divided into five wards: Central, Mayurra, Mount Muirhead, Nangula, and Rendlesham.
