= Dismal Swamp, South Australia =

Location in South Australia

Dismal Swamp South Australia
- Coordinates: 37.695090°S 140.716670°E
- Population: 63 (SAL 2021)
- Established: 1999
- Postcode(s): 5291
- Time zone: ACST (UTC+9:30)
  - Summer (DST): ACST (UTC+10:30)
- Location: 361 km (224 mi) south-east of Adelaide; 17 km (11 mi) north of Mount Gambier
- LGA(s): District Council of Grant
- Region: Limestone Coast
- County: Grey
- State electorate(s): Mount Gambier
- Federal division(s): Barker
Mean max temp	Mean min temp	Annual rainfall
19.0 °C; 66 °F	8.2 °C; 47 °F	710.9 mm 28 in
Suburbs around Dismal Swamp:
Koorine	Wepar; Tarpeena	Tarpeena; Mingbool
Glencoe	Dismal Swamp	Mingbool
Glencoe	Wandilo	Mingbool
- Footnotes: Locations; Adjoining localities

Dismal Swamp is a locality in the Australian state of South Australia located about 361 kilometres (224 mi) south-east of the state capital of Adelaide and about 19 kilometres (12 mi) north-west of the municipal seat of Mount Gambier.

Boundaries for the locality were created in February 1999 for the “long established name.” The name Dismal Swamp was used as early as 1845 when Anthony Sutton used the name for an occupation license on land described as being near Tarpeena. It is possible the name was inspired by the Great Dismal Swamp in the United States of America. A school with the name operated from 1948 to 1954.

Dismal Swamp is bounded on its east side by the Riddoch Highway which passes through the locality from north to south The Mount Gambier railway line which has been closed to freight since 12 April 1995 and tourist services since 1 July 2006, passes from north to south through the locality. The site of the former Wandilo railway station is located just north of the locality‘s southern boundary with Wandilo. The former Glencoe branch line passed through what is now the locality from 1904 to 1959 from the junction with the Mount Gambier railway line in Wandilo to the terminus in Glencoe.

The principal land use in the locality is primary production. Three parcels of land have been proclaimed for conservation purposes as the Telford Scrub Conservation Park and as the native forest reserves respectively known as Grundy Lane and Wandilo.

Dismal Swamp is located within the federal division of Barker, the state electoral district of Mount Gambier and the local government area of the District Council of Grant.
