= Mingbool, South Australia =

Mingbool South Australia
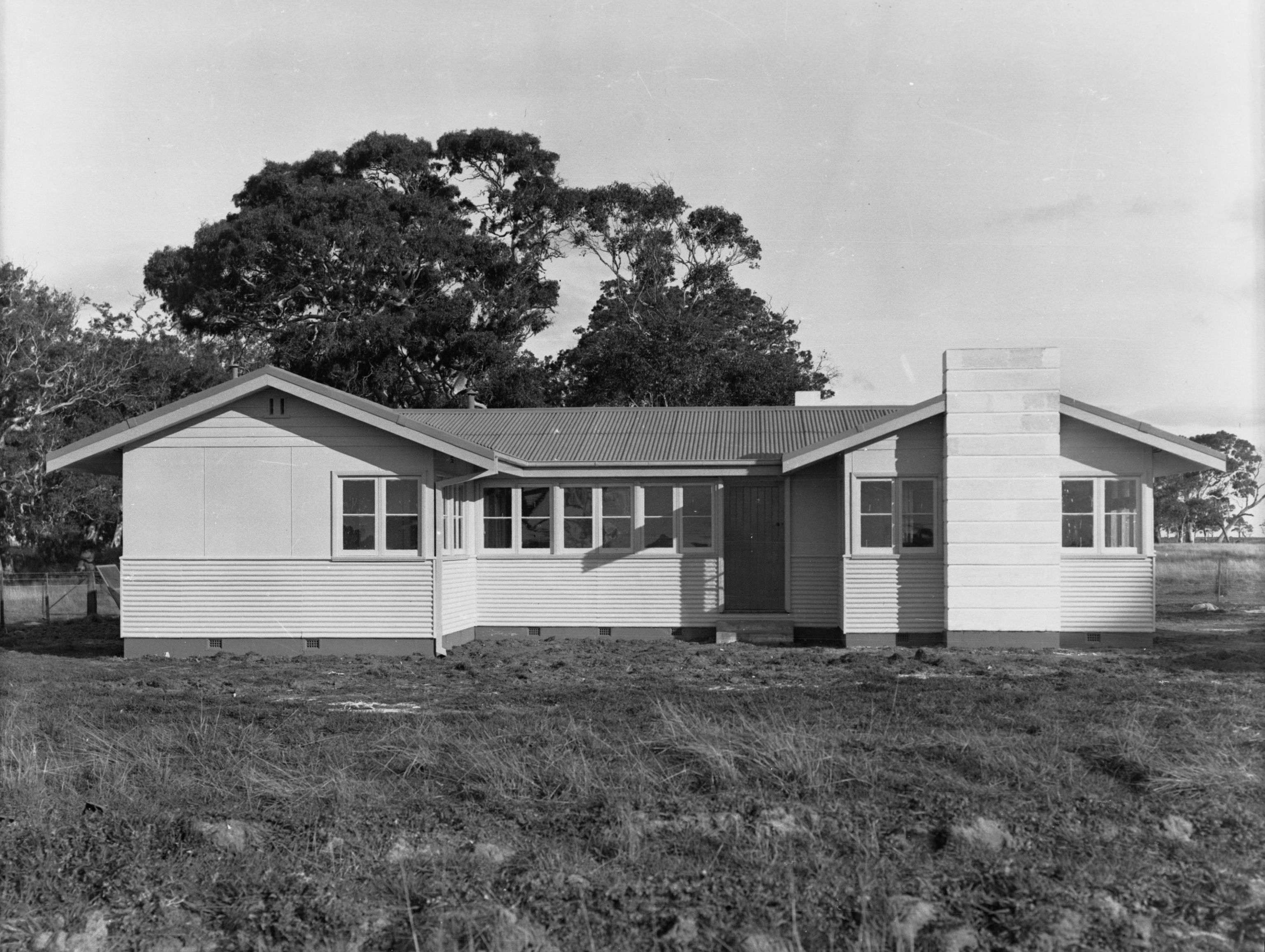
- Soldiers Home, May 1947

- Coordinates: 37°42′34″S 140°52′52″E
- Population: 123 (SAL 2021)
- Established: 1999
- Postcode(s): 5291
- Time zone: ACST (UTC+9:30)
  - Summer (DST): ACST (UTC+10:30)
- Location: 372 km (231 mi) south-east of Adelaide; 16 km (10 mi) north of Mount Gambier
- LGA(s): District Council of Grant
- Region: Limestone Coast
- County: Grey
- State electorate(s): Mount Gambier
- Federal division(s): Barker
Mean max temp	Mean min temp	Annual rainfall
19.0 °C; 66 °F	8.2 °C; 47 °F	710.9 mm 28 in
Suburbs around Mingbool:
Tarpeena	Tarpeena; Pleasant Park	Strathdowne
Tarpeena; Dismal Swamp; Wandilo	Mingbool	Strathdowne
Wandilo	Mil-Lel	Strathdowne
- Footnotes: Locations; Adjoining localities

Mingbool is a locality in the Australian state of South Australia located about 372 kilometres (231 mi) south-east of the state capital of Adelaide adjoining the border with the state of Victoria and about 16 kilometres (9.9 mi) north-west of the municipal seat of Mount Gambier.

Boundaries for the locality were created in February 1999 for the “long established name.” Its name is derived from the cadastral unit of the Hundred of Mingbool and ultimately from an aboriginal word for “water.”

Mingbool's western boundary aligns with the route of the Riddoch Highway while its eastern boundary is the state border.

The principal land use in the locality is primary production. Two parcels of land in its south-west corner located close to both the Riddoch Highway and the Mount Gambier Airport in the adjoining locality of Wandilo are zoned for industrial purposes.

The Mingbool homestead and stables is listed as a state heritage place on the South Australian Heritage Register.

Mingbool is located within the federal division of Barker, the state electoral district of Mount Gambier and the local government area of the District Council of Grant.
