= District Council of Tantanoola =

- Local government area
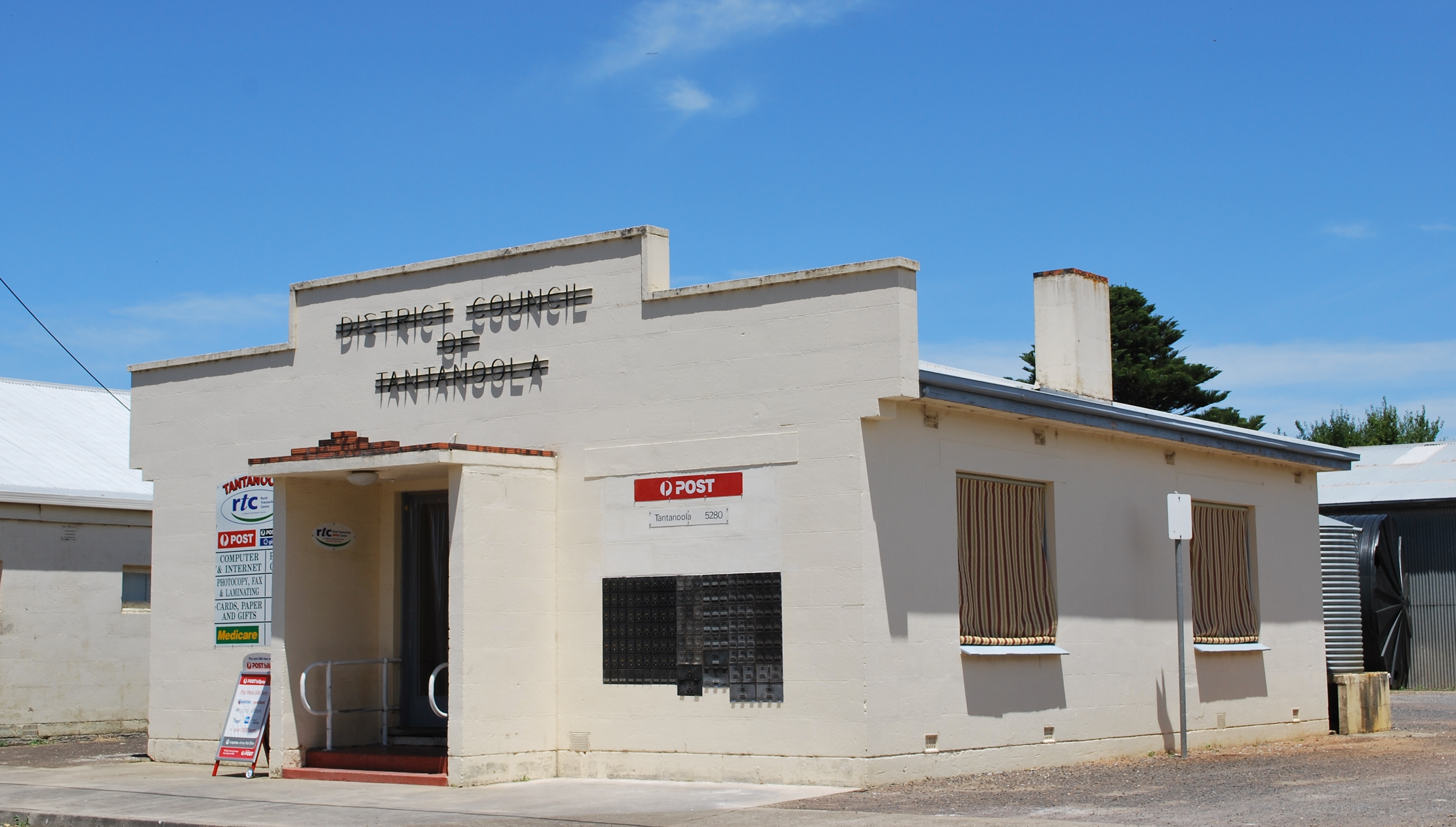
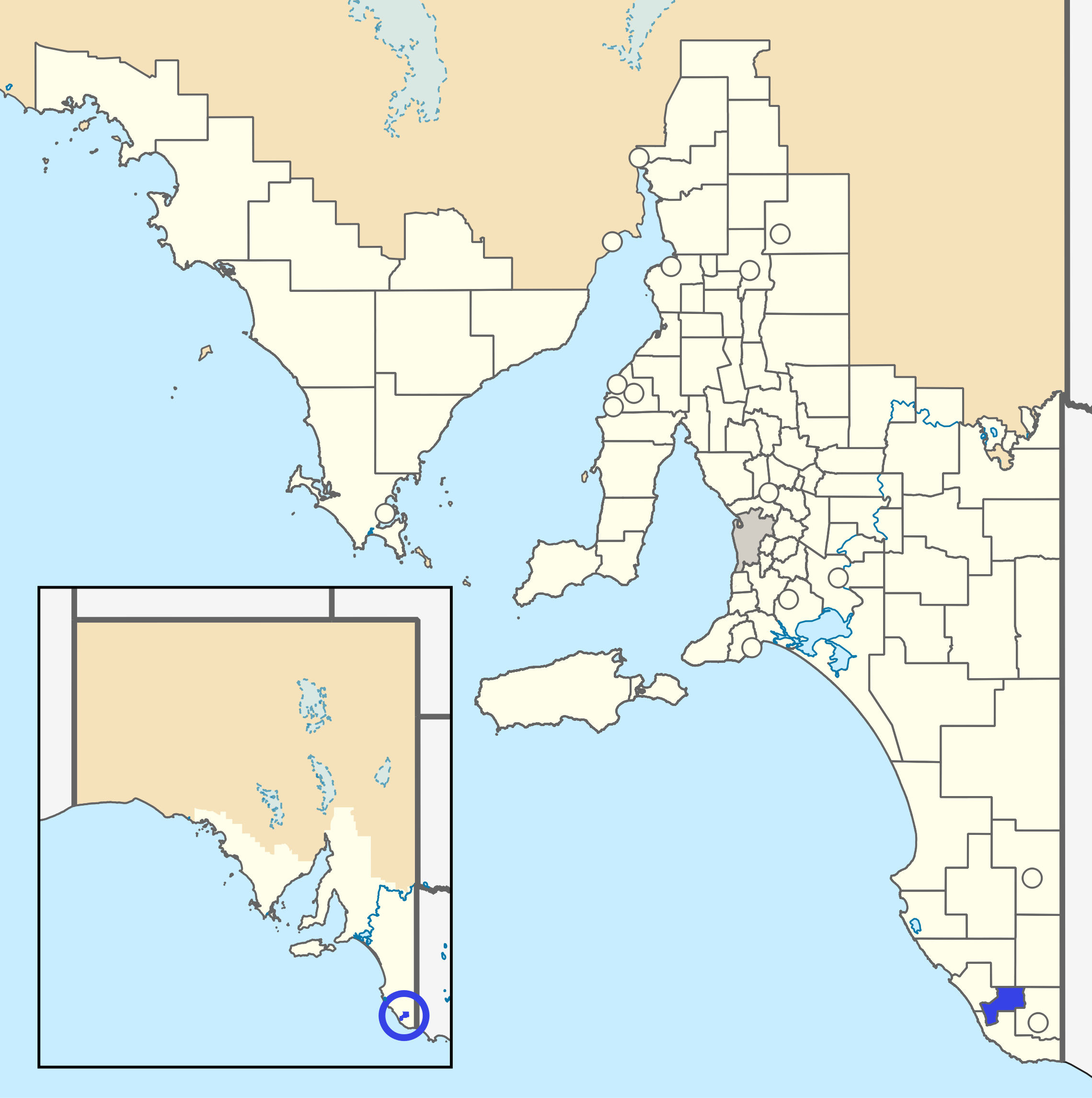
- Former chambers of the District Council of Tantantoola The District Council of Tantanoola as it was prior to disestablishment (blue)
- Coordinates: 37°41′51″S 140°27′20″E
- Country: Australia
- State: South Australia
- Established: 1888
- Abolished: 1975
- Council seat: Tantanoola
LGAs around District Council of Tantanoola
Mayurra/Millicent (1888–?)	Mount Muirhead (1888–1914); Mayurra/Millicent (1914–?)	Penola
Mount Muirhead (1888–1914); Mayurra/Millicent (1914–?)	Tantanoola	Mount Gambier (1888–?)
	Benara (1888–1932); Port MacDonnell (1932—?)	Mount Gambier (1888–?)

The District Council of Tantanoola was a local government area seated at Tantanoola in South Australia from 1888 to 1975.

== History ==
According to South Australian local government historian Sue Marsden "development of South Australia's South East was greatly helped by drainage schemes. Elsewhere in South Australia the Local Board of Main Roads was the precursor to local government, but in the South East it was district drainage boards." The original South-East Drainage District was formed in April 1876. Over the next five years parts were split off to form new drainage districts. The Tantanoola Drainage District was established in 1882 in the vicinity of Tantanoola township.

Six years later in January 1888 the drainage district was declared a council district and expanded to included all of the Hundred of Hindmarsh not already a part of the council area. The District Councils Act 1887 was a statewide legislative push to ensure all settled areas of the state be under local governance. It stated that all existing drainage districts (and the accompanying drainage boards) were to effectively become district councils.

Effective 23 May 1932, Tantanoola annexed a western part of the abolished District Council of Benara and District Council of Mount Gambier West. The Council was subsequently subdivided into Wards named Glencoe East Ward, Glencoe West Ward, Central Ward, and Bridge's Flat Ward.
