= Wattle Range, South Australia =

Wattle Range South Australia
- Coordinates: 37°25′38″S 140°32′41″E
- Population: 68 (SAL 2021)
- Established: 18 December 1997
- Postcode(s): 5280
- Time zone: ACST (UTC+9:30)
  - Summer (DST): ACST (UTC+10:30)
- Location: 328 km (204 mi) SE of Adelaide; 25 km (16 mi) NE of Millicent
- LGA(s): Wattle Range Council
- Region: Limestone Coast
- County: Grey
- State electorate(s): MacKillop
- Federal division(s): Barker
Mean max temp	Mean min temp	Annual rainfall
20.5 °C; 69 °F	8.1 °C; 47 °F	568.7 mm 22.4 in
Suburbs around Wattle Range:
Furner	Short	Short; Wattle Range East
Furner	Wattle Range	Wattle Range East
Furner	Mount Burr; Mount McIntyre	Mount McIntyre; Kalangadoo
- Footnotes: Locations; Adjoining localities

Wattle Range is a locality in the Australian state of South Australia located in the state’s south-east about 328 kilometres (204 mi) south-east of the state capital of Adelaide and about 25 kilometres (16 mi) north-east of the municipal seat in Millicent.

Wattle Range’s boundaries were created on 18 December 1997 for the “local established name” which is derived from the Wattle Range Community Centre which is located in the adjoining locality of Wattle Range East. The locality’s boundaries align with following existing roads and drains. Clay Wells Road, and Lde Road (sic) to the north, a section of the Grey Riddoch Drain to the north-east, Manga Road to the east, the Reedy Creek B13 Drain and the Mount Burr Road in the south, and O’neills Lane to the west.

Land use within Wattle Range is zoned as primary production with the exception of land dedicated as the Calectasia Conservation Park in the locality’s north-east corner.

Wattle Range is located within the federal division of Barker, the state electoral district of MacKillop and the local government area of the Wattle Range Council.
