= Whyalla Airlines Flight 904 =

2000 aviation accident

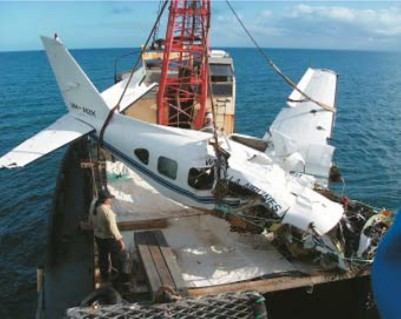
- Wreckage after the recovery, showing the missing right wing and severely crushed cockpit

Accident
- Date: 31 May 2000
- Summary: Water landing following dual engine failure
- Site: Spencer Gulf, South Australia

Aircraft
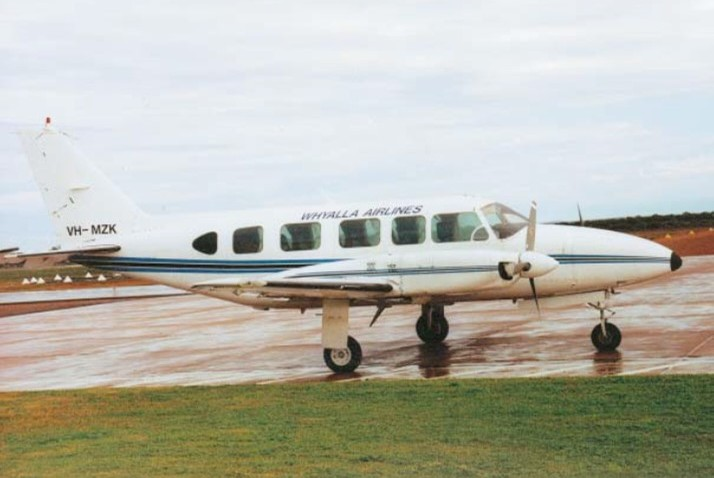
- VH-MZK, the aircraft involved in the accident
- Aircraft type: Piper PA-31 Navajo
- Operator: Whyalla Airlines
- IATA flight No.: WW904
- Call sign: MIKE ZULU KILO
- Registration: VH-MZK
- Flight origin: Adelaide Airport
- Destination: Whyalla Airport
- Occupants: 8
- Passengers: 7
- Crew: 1
- Fatalities: 8
- Survivors: 0

Whyalla Airlines Flight 904 was a scheduled commuter flight, operated by a Piper PA-31 Navajo which crashed while attempting to ditch in the Spencer Gulf, South Australia after suffering failures of both engines on the evening of 31 May 2000. All 8 people on board the aircraft were killed as a result of the accident. The findings of a subsequent investigation by the Australian Transport Safety Bureau highlighting the airline's operating procedures as a key factor leading to the accident were later overturned after they were contradicted by evidence presented at a coronial inquiry into the deaths of those on board the flight. The safety implications arising from the accident led to a recall by engine manufacturer Textron Lycoming which saw close to 1000 aircraft grounded worldwide while defects were rectified at an estimated cost of $A66 million. Australia's aviation regulator, the Civil Aviation Safety Authority also mandated lifejackets be carried on all aircraft operating over water after the crash.

== Accident ==
Flight 904 departed Adelaide Airport at 18:23 and climbed to an altitude of 6,000 ft (1,800 m) before turning to track directly towards Whyalla. Much of the route was flown over the waters of Gulf St Vincent and Spencer Gulf while in darkness, with a short distance crossing the isolated Yorke Peninsula. Approximately 30 minutes later the pilot notified Adelaide Air Traffic Control that he was commencing descent into Whyalla. At 19:01, the pilot issued a distress call, advising both engines had failed and he intended to ditch the aircraft if unable to make the destination. Contact with flight 904 was maintained for another three minutes, to a point approximately 15 nautical miles (28 km) from Whyalla. Shortly after the final transmission from the aircraft, the crew of another flight nearby detected a signal from an Emergency Locator Transmitter which lasted between 10 and 20 seconds.

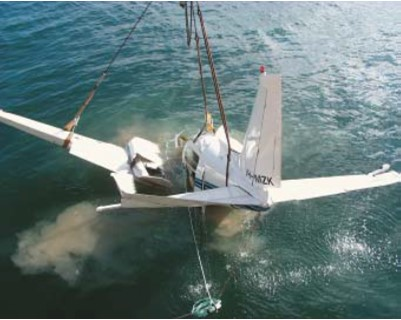
Wreckage being recovered and lifted out of the water

A search and rescue operation recovered two bodies and debris from the water the following morning. On 6 June, a further five bodies were recovered by police divers from the main wreckage which had been located on the sea floor. The eighth victim was never located. The accident was the first recorded ditching involving a Piper Navajo in Australia, and the deadliest crash involving a scheduled airline since 1980.

== Aftermath and ATSB investigation ==
The main wreckage of the Piper Navajo was raised from the sea floor on 9 June and found to be relatively intact. During the investigation, aviation regulator CASA grounded the small airline as part of a separate, ongoing audit of its operations, hearing allegations that the airline forced pilots who reported they were fatigued to continue working or face dismissal and that records of duty hours had been falsified. These claims were strongly denied by the company management who insisted they maintained a good safety culture. The grounding resulted in the dismissal of the airline's pilots and disruption to air services throughout the isolated Eyre Peninsula. The company had previously been subject to investigation by the regulator following a 1997 forced landing when one of its aircraft had run low on fuel. An audit had uncovered 119 breaches, and saw the chief pilot's endorsement revoked. However, the airline was able to satisfy the regulator and was permitted to continue operating. On 21 April 2000, just weeks before the accident the original chief pilot was approved by CASA and reinstated in the position, after his replacement quit amid concerns about the company management and safety culture. It was also revealed the accident aircraft had suffered another engine failure in January 2000 while being flown by the same pilot. The engine had been replaced following the incident.

The ATSB's report on the accident was released in December 2001. The 150-page document included nine separate safety recommendations, focusing on the apparent relationship between Whyalla Airlines' fuel mixture practices and chemical deposits from accumulating inside pistons and cylinder heads affecting engine reliability. Recommendations were also made with regards to safety and survival equipment carried on small aircraft operated commercially. The report found that the aircraft's left engine first suffered a catastrophic failure after the crankshaft failed as a result of fatigue cracking. It suggested the actions of the pilot in continuing to Whyalla while increasing power on the right engine contributed to it also failing as a result of mishandling and overloading due to extra strain. The report did not attribute a probable cause of the accident.

The findings of the report were disputed by many in the aviation industry, in particular the emphasis on lead oxybromide deposits formed as a result of the engines running at high temperatures due to the company's fuel saving policies. The report attributed these deposits as the cause of detonation within the cylinder head which blew a hole in the right engine, although the validity of this finding was disputed outside of the Bureau. Commentators in the United States where the aircraft was manufactured weighed in to the controversy. John Deakin, a highly experienced pilot and writer for US aviation news website AVweb raised further questions. Deakin pointed out that one month after the report was published, engine manufacturer Textron Lycoming notified operators of the same model fitted to flight 904 of a recall to address defective crankshafts, and provided a number of plausible scenarios leading to engine failures which were overlooked by the investigation. With a lack of corroborating evidence other than the ATSB's own research, Deakin labelled the findings as "junk science". Flying magazine editor Richard Collins disagreed however, describing the report as "the most complete accident report on a mechanically related general aviation piston airplane accident" he had ever seen.

== Coronial inquest and second report ==
A coronial inquest into the deaths of the accident victims and adequacy of the ATSB investigation began in July 2002. South Australian Coroner Wayne Chivell delivered his findings on 24 July 2003, exonerating the pilot and overturning the ATSB's conclusions. The conduct of the ATSB during the inquiry was described by the court as "uncooperative and defensive" after reviewing scientific evidence which contradicted the report, indicating that the initial failure occurred in one of the cylinders in the right engine as a result of overheating that may have been exacerbated by the presence of lead oxybromide deposits. The engine however would have continued operating at a reduced power, affecting the pilot's decision to continue to Whyalla. The coroner found the failure of the left engine was caused by a metallurgic defect, present in the broken crankshaft since its manufacture, hence the failures were independent of each other. The inquest was critical that the ATSB had not taken into account as many as 15 similar engine failures leading to Textron Lycoming's recall, including two that occurred in Australia after the accident. Just days before the report was released in December 2001, the Bureau was notified of an incident involving a Sharp Airlines Piper Chieftain which suffered a broken crankshaft in one of its engines.

Chivell also accused the ATSB of dismissing the possibility of the engines on flight 904 failing independently of one another simply because it was extremely unlikely, and that the original investigation was flawed because it had tried to make the available evidence fit a theory, instead of exploring all possibilities and described the Bureau's attitude to the investigation as arrogant.

In response to the coroner's findings, the ATSB undertook to improve the way in which it interacted with State Coroners during safety investigations, developing a memorandum of understanding to engage with and clarify the aspects of the investigation that the Bureau considered within its scope and encouraging coroners to share information and liaise with the Bureau on matters they believed should be included in reporting and analysis of accidents. It argued however that while it was not the ATSB's job to attribute blame in an accident, the coroner's investigation commissioned experts including representatives from a US firm acting on behalf of victims families in a civil litigation case seeking damages from engine manufacturer Textron Lycoming. A supplementary accident investigation was opened in November 2002 to consider new evidence heard before the Coronial Inquest. The second report was published in October 2003, acknowledging the coroner's findings, but maintaining that the sequence of events and contributing factors discussed in the Bureau's original report remained the most likely explanation for the accident.

== Legacy and safety action ==
As a result of the investigations into the crash of Whyalla Airlines 904, the Civil Aviation Safety Authority accepted and acted upon some of the recommendations made by both the ATSB and the South Australian Coroner. This included immediately mandating that all flights operated within Australia over water with paying passengers on board were to carry life jackets. Previously, this had been only required for aircraft carrying more than nine passengers. Subsequent revisions of the regulations in the aftermath of the accident also went further, requiring emergency beacons, lighting and provisions to be carried on such flights. The investigations also prompted CASA to take action warning pilots and operators of high performance piston engine aircraft about potential dangers of running engines with a leaner than optimal fuel-air mixture.
