= Mount Gambier Airport =

Mount Gambier Regional Airport
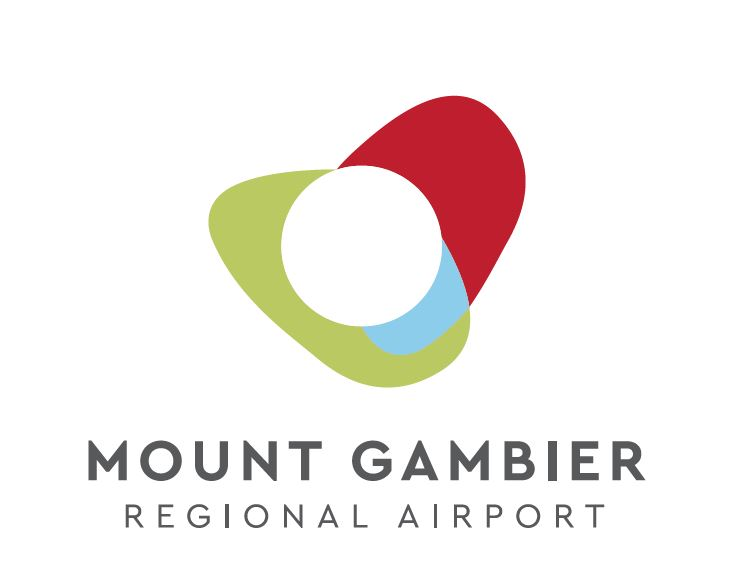

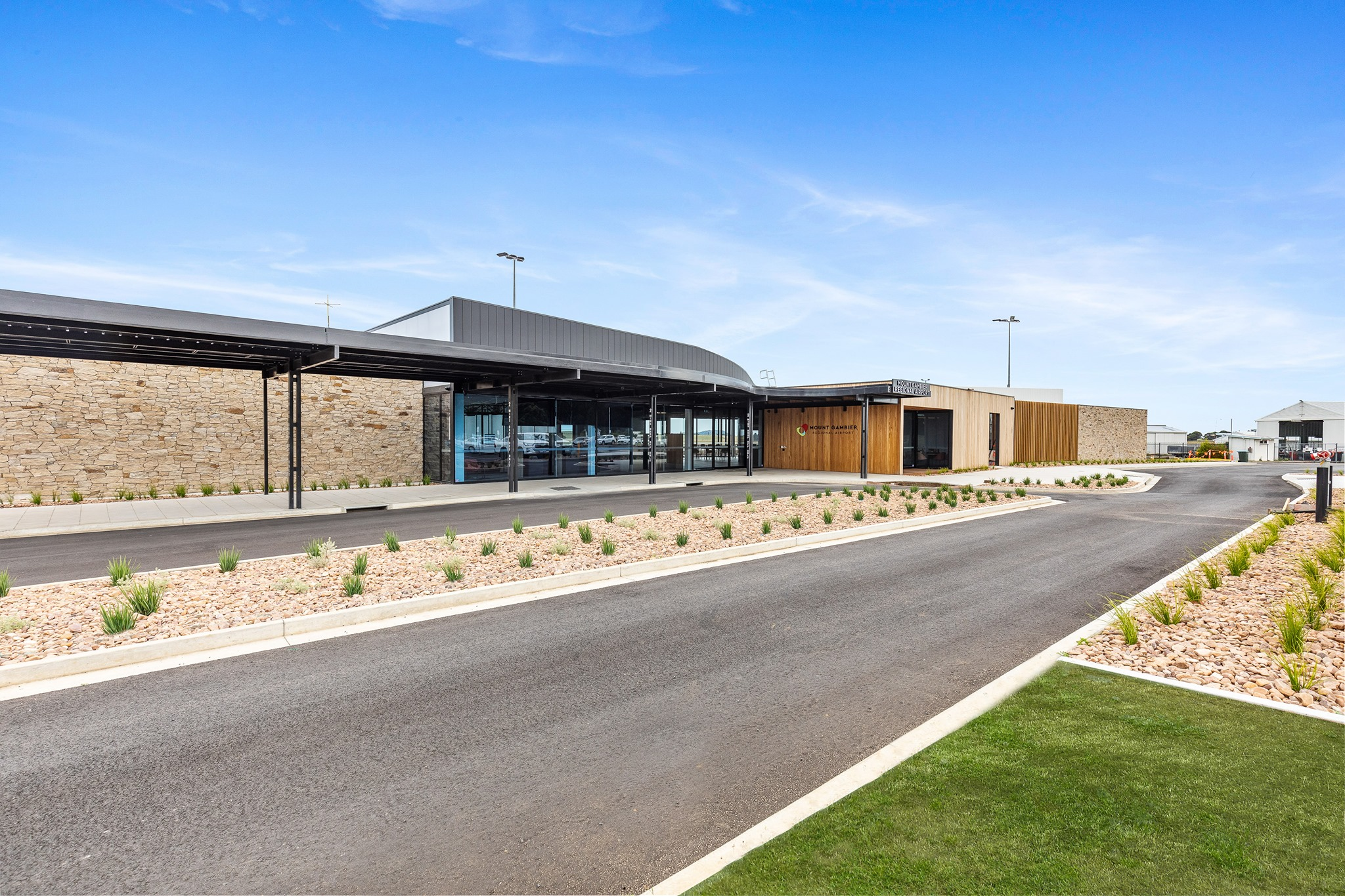
- Terminal building in March 2021.
- IATA: MGB; ICAO: YMTG

Summary
- Airport type: Public
- Owner/Operator: District Council of Grant
- Serves: Mount Gambier, the Limestone Coast region and neighbouring Victorian towns
- Location: Wandilo, South Australia
- Elevation AMSL: 212 ft (65 m)
- Coordinates: 37°44′52″S 140°47′01″E
- Website: Official website

Map
- Location in South Australia

Runways
Direction	Length		Surface
Direction	m	ft	Surface
18/36	1,644	5,394	Asphalt
11/29	922	3,025	Asphalt
06/24	846	2,776	Asphalt

Statistics (2010/11)
- Passengers: 92,261
- Aircraft movements: 4,149
- Sources: Australian AIP and aerodrome chart, passenger and aircraft movements from the BITRE

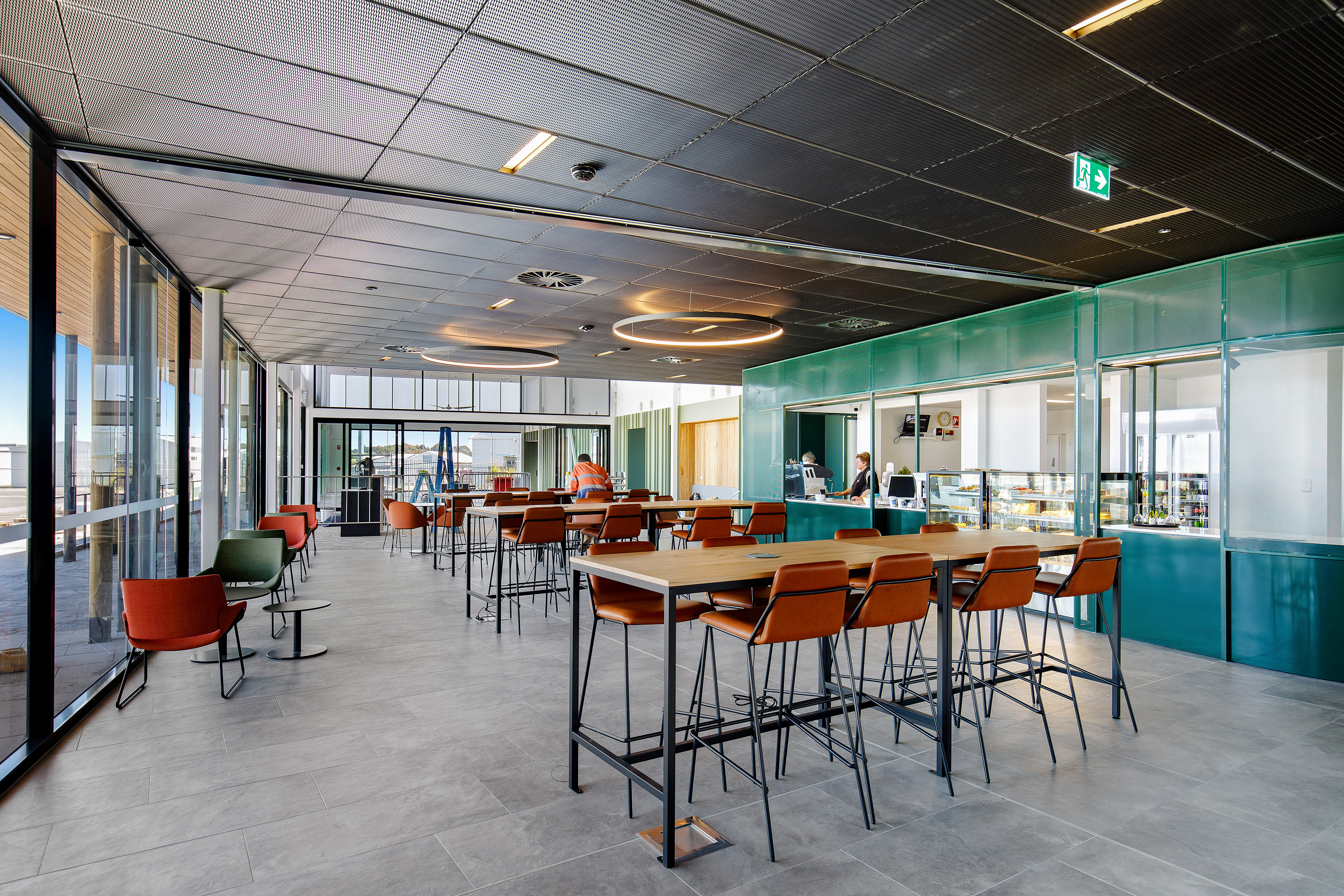
Waiting area in the terminal.

Mount Gambier Regional Airport (IATA: MGB, ICAO: YMTG) is a domestic and general aviation airport serving the city of Mount Gambier, being the fourth-busiest airport in South Australia, Australia.

Located on the Riddoch Highway in the suburb of Wandilo, approximately 12 km (7.5 mi) north of the city center, it is the primary airport serving the Limestone Coast region of South Australia as well towns in the bordering state of Victoria.

As of October 2026, the airport is served by Rex Airlines, with multiple daily flights to Adelaide and Melbourne. Car rental options are provided by Avis, Thrifty, Budget and Hertz.

== History ==
The original Mount Gambier aerodrome was established when Mr H.S. (Stan) May and Mr S.C. Davis purchased land directly opposite the present airport on the Riddoch Highway. An aerodrome was established and basic infrastructure provided with the aerodrome officially opened on 21 May 1930. Scheduled airline services to Adelaide and Melbourne began the same year. The aerodrome owners then purchased 82 hectares of land that was part of 'Croyle Estate' and then another 66 hectares of the same property on 2 June 1936. This site is where the airport is today. A licence was granted by the then-Civil Aviation Branch of the Department of Defence on 1 July 1936 and the new airport began hosting regular public transport flights.

In July 1939, the Federal Government purchased the aerodrome from its civilian owners and commenced the construction of a Royal Australian Air Force base which was to house the No. 2 Air Observers School (2AOS). It was officially formed on 6 February 1941 and the first intake of trainees began on 6 March 1941.

The school had its own ambulance, hospital, butcher, gymnasium and even cinema and at its peak was home to over 1000 personnel. It was eventually disbanded in January 1946 after training over 4000 Air Observers, Navigators and Wireless Operators, of which many served with RAF Bomber Command over Germany, Atlantic Ocean, the Middle East and South East Asia. 2AOS also conducted coastal surveillance operations in the South East of South Australia, reporting a number of submarine sightings.

On 29 May 1947, the airport was handed over to the Department of Civil Aviation and this saw the return of regular public transport flights to the region with Ansett Airways announcing that a daily service would operate between Mount Gambier and Melbourne. In July 1947, the Mount Gambier Gliding Club was formed and over the next 40 years the airport continued to prosper as a critical port for flights from Adelaide and Melbourne.

== Upgrades ==
In 2011, it was announced that Mount Gambier Airport would be upgraded under a $3.4 million program. This project was partly funded by the Government of South Australia who awarded a $500,000 infrastructure grant with the balance coming from the airport's reserve fund. The upgrade, part of a 15-year redevelopment plan, will strengthen the main runway, aprons and taxiways, to enable larger aircraft to operate to the airport and help increase the area's tourism appeal.

A further more substantial upgrade was unveiled in July 2019 which included replacement of the existing terminal with a new modern and larger facility, with the ability to implement future security screening. Construction commenced in November 2019 and was completed in early 2021. The $9.2M upgrade project was jointly funded by the Australian Government through the Building Better Regions Fund in partnership with the South Australian State Government. The City of Mount Gambier also supported the Airport upgrade with a financial contribution.

As well as the new $6.2m terminal, the upgrade also includes an extension of 120 metres to the main runway to service larger aircraft, a brand new heavy aircraft apron to house a larger contingent of fire bombers and other heavy aircraft and the entire airport precinct has had a full electrical upgrade from the previous 1950s system.

== Operations ==
=== Ansett Airways ===
The defunct airline Ansett Airways formerly operated scheduled domestic services with routes to Adelaide and Melbourne before being placed into administration in 2001.

=== Aerostar Aviation ===
In 2014, Adelaide-based company Aerostar Aviation announced they would open a flight training school utilising existing infrastructure. The facility will include 1 full-time flight instructor and a Cessna 172. It had been 15 years since the airport had been able to offer flight training, since the closure of the O'Connor Airlines training facility in 1999.

=== deBruin Air ===
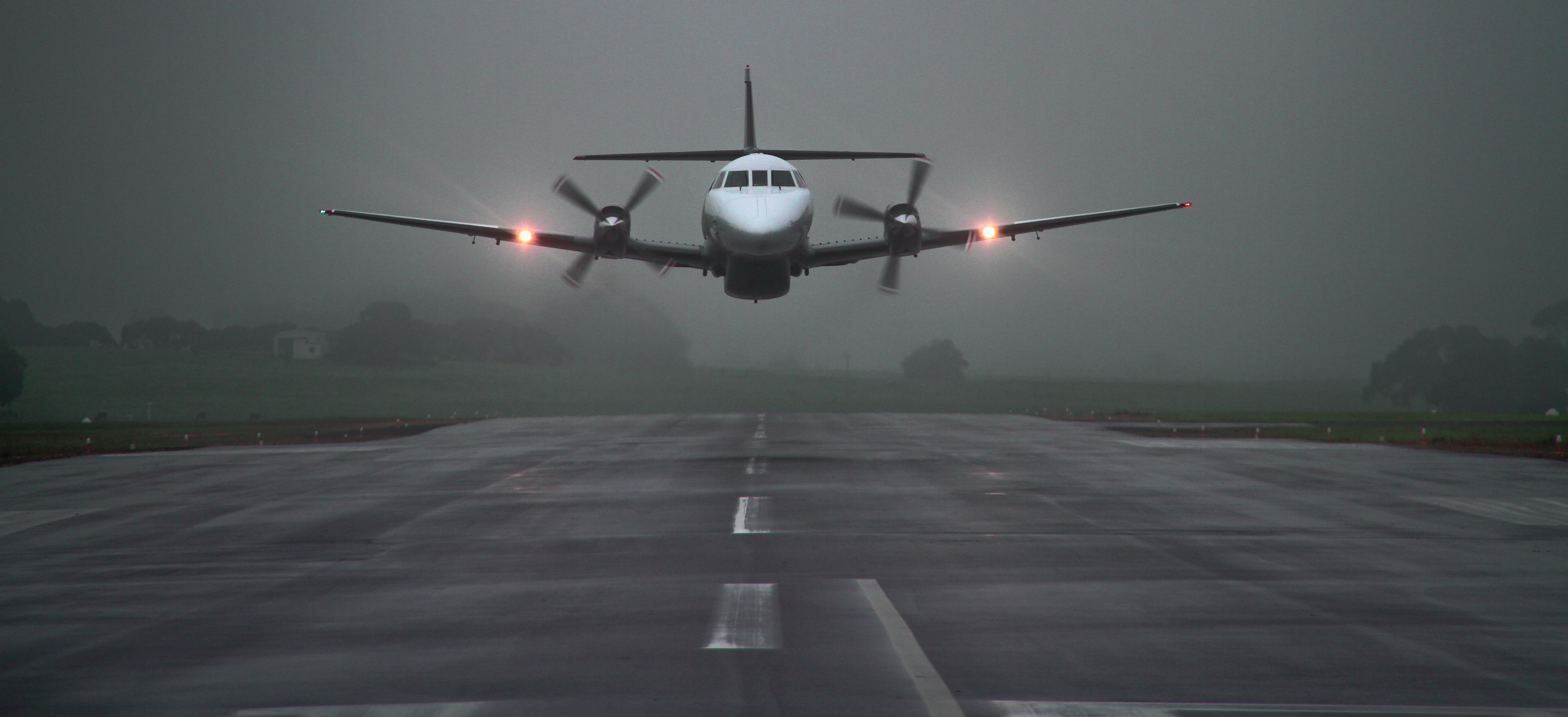
de Bruin Air Jetstream 32 takes off at Mount Gambier Airport (2014)

In 2008, Mount Gambier businessman Adrian deBruin formed air charter company deBruin Air after acquiring the assets of defunct airline O'Connor Airlines. The company catered for executive and business charter, contract charter including fly-in fly-out, aerial photography, fire spotting and freight. DeBruin Air was formally closed in early 2016.

=== Gambier Flying School ===
In mid-2016, flight instructor Tony Peters commenced operations trading as Gambier Flying School. The school currently operates two small aircraft and caters for students working towards either their RA, GA or Commercial Pilots licences.

=== O'Connor Airlines ===
O'Connor Airlines, which ceased operations 14 December 2007, was formerly based at the airport before going into voluntary administration. The airline initially began with a flight training school in 1973 before expanding into freight and passenger services with scheduled domestic routes to Adelaide and Melbourne..

=== Rex Airlines ===
In 2002, Australiawide Airlines, a consortium of former Ansett Australia employees acquired Hazelton Airlines and Kendell Airlines to form a new regional airline. Rex Airlines continues to operate daily flights between Adelaide, Mount Gambier and Melbourne.

=== QantasLink ===
In 2009, QantasLink announced it was exploring further services into regional South Australia, including flights to Mount Gambier. The airline has announced it will introduce a new air service between Adelaide to Port Lincoln, however QantasLink says while Port Lincoln is its primary focus, it will explore further expansion into regional areas.

In 2014, QantasLink announced a further 1 of 2 destinations were under consideration – Mount Gambier and Whyalla. The new service was awarded to Whyalla.

In 2020, QantasLink announced further expansion of regional routes, with flights from Mount Gambier to Adelaide and Melbourne commencing in March 2021, using Dash 8 300 Series aircraft. After only six weeks of flying to Mount Gambier, QantasLink increased the frequency on the Adelaide route from 5 weekly return flights to 12. This was part of a partnership between Qantas and the SA Government to establish a base at Adelaide Airport.

On April 14, 2026 Qantas announced the Adelaide route due to fuel shortages and declining demand was to end on May 18, 2026.

== Airlines and destinations ==
Rex Airlines connects Mount Gambier Airport to Adelaide Airport and Melbourne Airport.

== Statistics ==
Mount Gambier Airport was ranked 45th in Australia for the number of revenue passengers served in financial year 2010–2011.

Annual passenger and aircraft statistics for Mount Gambier
Year	Revenue passengers	Aircraft movements
2000/01	78,058	7,326
2001/02	65,998	7,564
2002/03	68,501	7,278
2003/04	78,198	7,913
2004/05	95,502	7,782
2005/06	102,121	7,614
2006/07	109,435	5,704
2007/08	115,365	4,348
2008/09	98,247	4,459
2009/10	97,085	4,459
2010/11	92,261	4,149
2011/12	89,178	4,170
2012/13	83,011	4,028
2013/14	78,967	3,978
2014/15	76,950	3,985
2015/16	77,191	3,990
2016/17	78,304	3,948
2017/18	80,571	3,801
2018/19	81,781	3,571
2019/20	62,661	2,802
2020/21	26,714	1,587
2021/22	51,652	2,916
2022/23	76,673	3,629
2023/24	72,865	3,226
2024/25	71,002	3,227

Source Bitre

== Aero Club ==
The Mount Gambier Aero Club Inc. was originally formed in the 1930s and continued through to the Second World War when the airport was taken over by the Royal Australian Air Force. The present day aero club was established as the Mount Gambier Gliding and Soaring Club in July 1947 and continued under this name until 31 May 1957 when it was renamed the Mount Gambier Aero Club, the name used to the present day.

== See also ==
- List of airports in South Australia
