= Snuggery Power Station =

- Country: Australia
- Location: South Australia
- Coordinates: 37°39′52″S 140°24′57.7″E
- Status: Operational
- Commission date: 1978
- Operator: Synergen Power - International Power

Thermal power station
- Primary fuel: Diesel
- Turbine technology: Gas turbine

Power generation
- Units operational: 3
- Nameplate capacity: 63 MW

Snuggery Power Station is a power station near Tantanoola in the Limestone Coast region of South Australia. It was built in 1978. It is now owned by Synergen Power, a subsidiary of Engie Energy International.

The power station has a generating capacity of 63 MW, consisting of three diesel-fueled open cycle gas turbines. It is used as a peaking power plant. Engie announced in February 2024 that Snuggery and Port Lincoln diesel power plants would be taken out of regular service from July 2024, and fully closed in 2028, serving as reserve power in the meantime.
