= Tantanoola Caves Conservation Park =

Conservation park in South Australia

- IUCN category III (natural monument or feature)
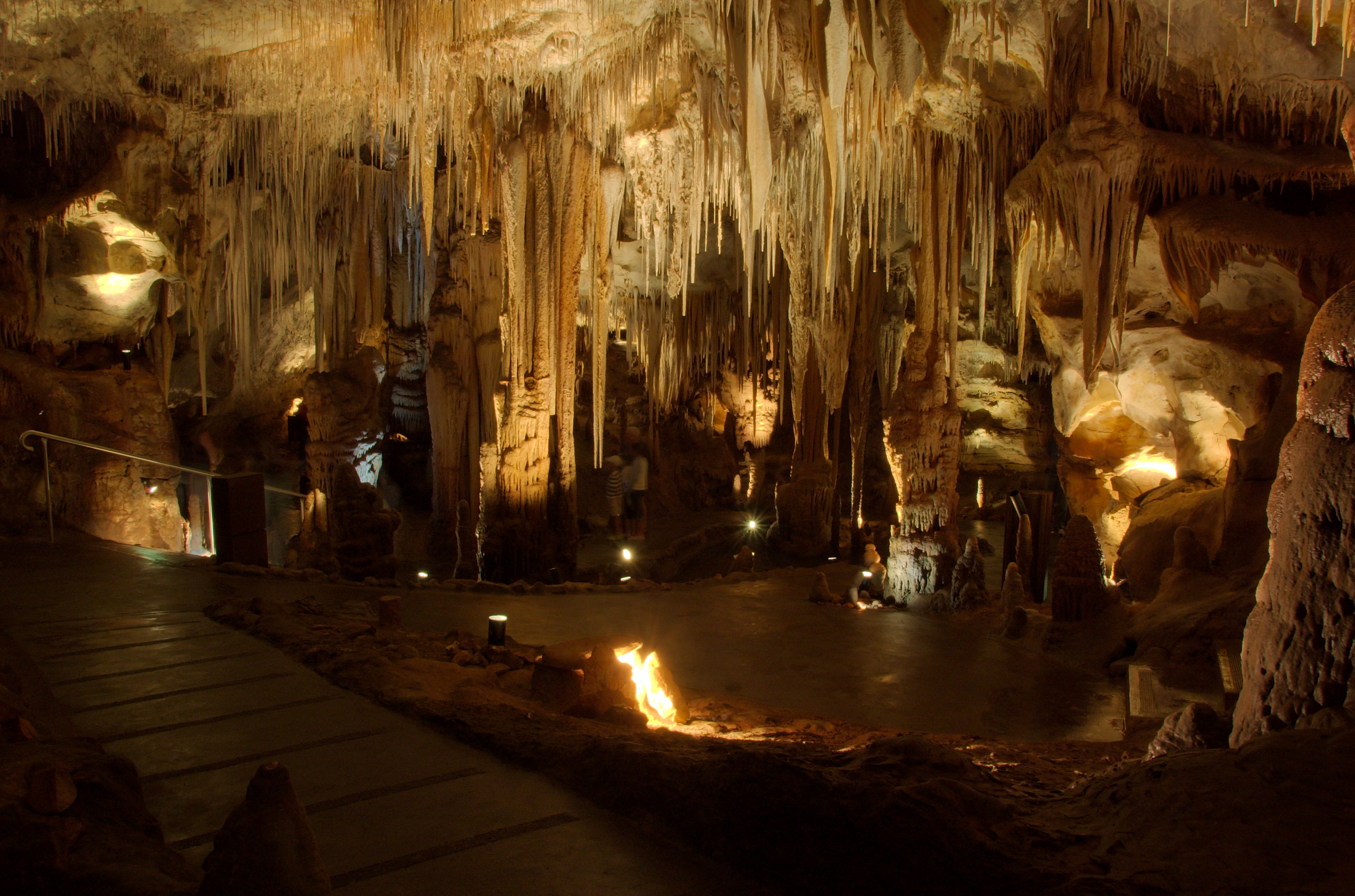
- Main chamber of Tantantoola cave
- Location: South Australia, Tantanoola
- Governing body: Department for Environment and Water

The Tantanoola Caves Conservation Park is a 14-hectare (35-acre) protected area near Tantanoola in the Limestone Coast tourism region in the south-east of South Australia. The conservation park preserves two main caves; the wheelchair accessible Tantanoola Cave which is developed as a show cave and Lake Cave which is a restricted access cave used by the Department for Environment and Water scientists as a reference site for other karst features in the region. Visitors can explore the information centre and learn about the caves during a guided tour.

== History ==
=== European discovery ===
The Tantantoola cave, which is located within the boundaries of what is now the conservation park, was first discovered in 1930 by local boy Boyce Lane.

== Structure ==
The Tantanoola cave is located inside Up and Down Rock, an ancient marine cliff towering over the highway. The Miocene bryozoan dolomite which underlies the Gambier limestone of the area was once uplifted along the Tartwaup fault-line. During the Pleistocene the seashore was located right at this dolomite. The sea worked on the rocks and formed a cliff by continually destroying the rocks at the bottom of the cliff with the energy of the waves. This work results in sea caves, overhangs and a cliff face which is always more or less vertical. But then the sea receded, either because the sea level lowered or because the land was uplifted.

Today the cliff is far from the sea, but shells, pebbles and seal bones left behind by the ocean can be found inside Tantanoola Cave, and witness the marine history. The pounding waves of the sea breached entrances to the cave, still, it is a karst cave, not a sea cave. The marine sediments entered first through cracks and solution tubes until a larger breach occurred. The material formed a bar, which blocked the entrance off again. Later the speleothems appeared, covering some of the marine deposits and old entrances.

As Tantanoola Cave is rather small, and only a single chamber, there are no narrow passages. So in 1983 the entrance of the cave was lowered and the steps of the path removed. This made it Australia's first wheelchair access cave.

== Visitor attraction ==
The park is a visitor destination in itself, with picnic grounds and play areas for children. Show cave tours are guided by professional interpreters through Tantanoola Cave, showcasing the numerous decorations on display.

== Notes ==
This article incorporates text available under the CC0 license.

== See also ==
- Protected areas of South Australia
