= Tantanoola, South Australia =

Tantanoola
- Town
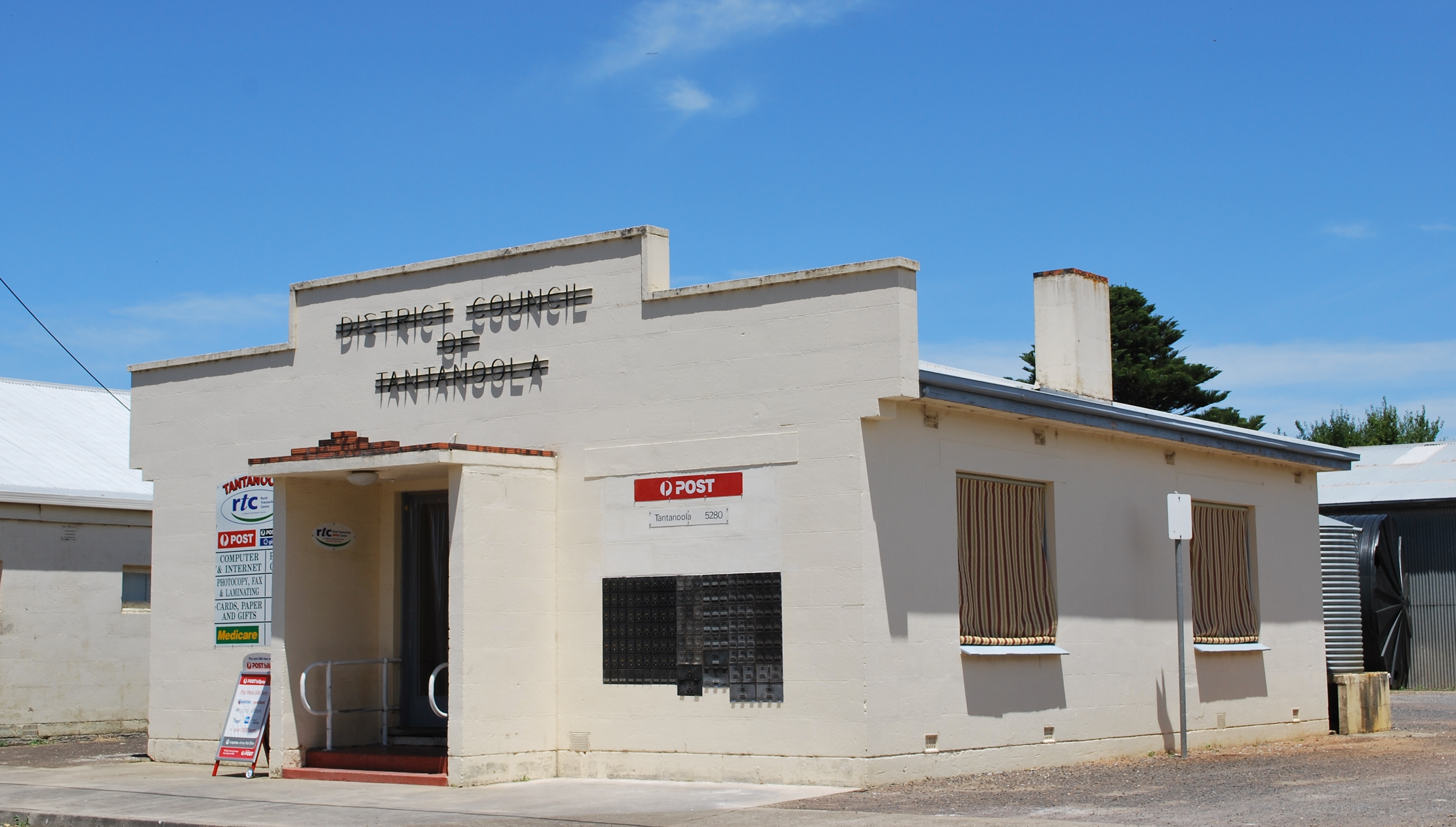
- Post office

- Coordinates: 37°41′51″S 140°27′20″E
- Country: Australia
- State: South Australia
- Region: Limestone Coast
- LGAs: Wattle Range Council; District Council of Grant
- Location: 350 km (220 mi) SE of Adelaide; 18 km (11 mi) SE of Millicent
- Established: 10 July 1879 (town); 23 February 1995 (locality)

Government
  - State electorate: MacKillop
  - Federal division: Barker
- Elevation (Railway Station): 25 m (82 ft)

Population
  - Total: 226 (UCL 2021)
- Time zone: UTC+9:30 (ACST)
  - Summer (DST): UTC+10:30 (ACDT)
- Postcode: 5280
- County: Grey
- Mean max temp: 19.0 °C (66.2 °F)
- Mean min temp: 8.2 °C (46.8 °F)
- Annual rainfall: 712.4 mm (28.05 in)
Localities around Tantanoola
| Millicent | Rocky Camp; Mount Burr | Mount McIntyre |
| Canunda | Tantanoola | Glencoe |
| German Flat | German Creek | Burrungule |

Tantanoola is a town in regional South Australia. The name is derived from the aboriginal word tentunola, which means boxwood / brushwood hill or camp. Tantanoola was originally named 'Lucieton' by Governor Jervois after his daughter Lucy Caroline, on 10 July 1879. It was changed by Governor Robinson to 'Tantanoola' on 4 October 1888. At the 2006 census, Tantanoola had a population of 255.

Tantanoola is in the Wattle Range Council local government area, the South Australian House of Assembly electoral districts of MacKillop and Mount Gambier, and the Australian House of Representatives Division of Barker.

The primary school closed in July 2020 after having more staff than students. The remaining students transferred to nearby schools in Millicent and Mount Gambier.

== History ==
The township of Tantanoola is situated in the Hundred of Hindmarsh, 425 km south east of Adelaide, and was once a portion of Mayurra Station. It was the second town of importance on the Mount Gambier to Rivoli Bay railway line which was built in 1878, converted from narrow to broad gauge in 1957 and ceased operating to freight in April 1995 then Limestone Coast Railway tourist passengers on 1 July 2006 which spanned across 128 years between Tantanoola and Mount Gambier.

The historic Tantanoola railway station is listed on the South Australian Heritage Register.

== Tantanoola Tiger ==
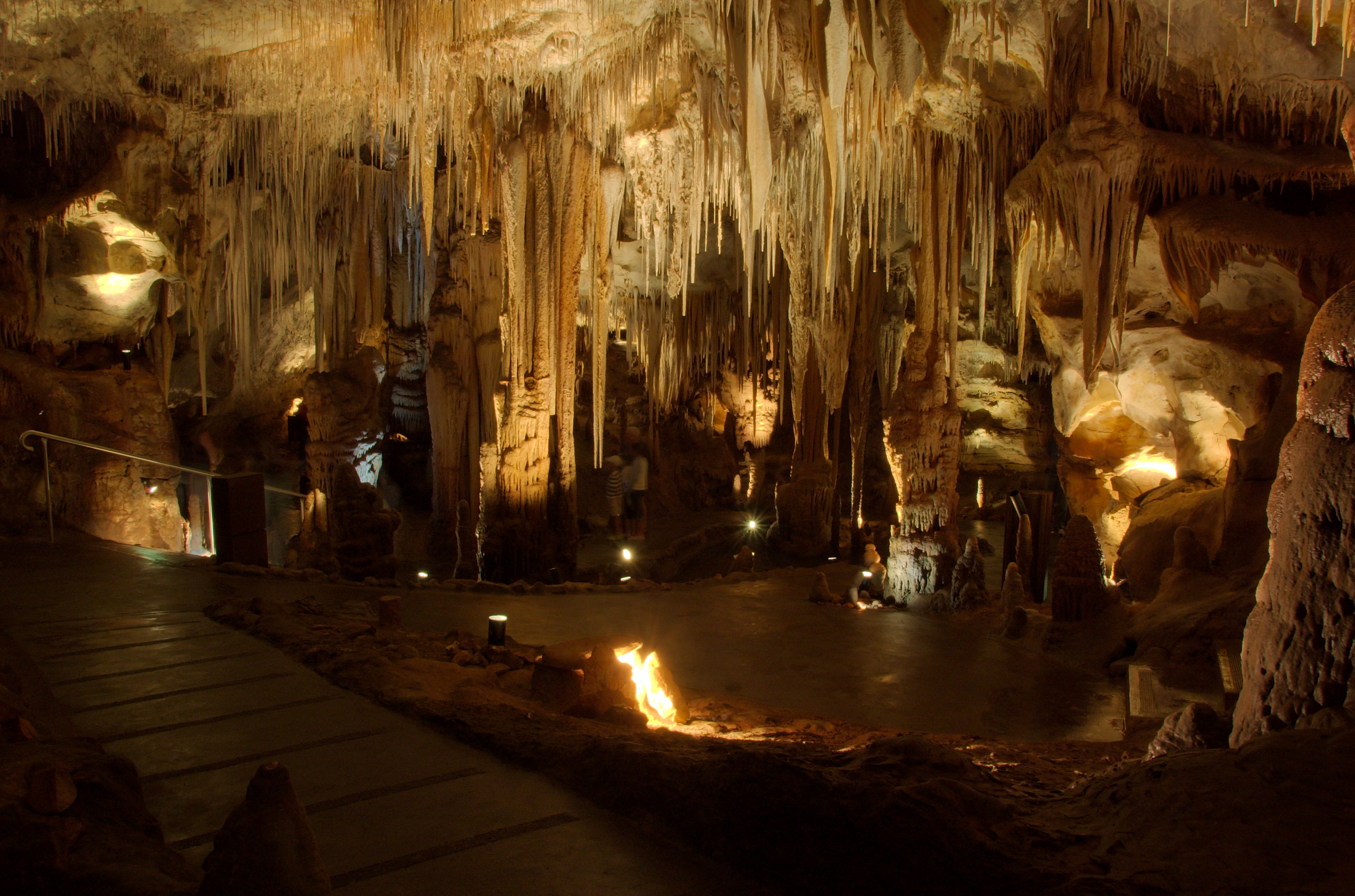
Caves near Tantanoola

Tantanoola is known for the Tantanoola Tiger, a phantom cat which supposedly stalked the area during the late nineteenth century. In August 1895 an animal was shot by one Thomas John Donovan, which was believed to have been the mysterious predator. The animal turned out to be more like a wolf than a cat. Later, it was determined to be an Arabian wolf, although how it arrived in South Australia has been the subject of a number of theories. It is currently preserved and on display at the Tantanoola Hotel (which is also known colloquially as the Tantanoola Tiger Hotel). The football club is also known as the Tantanoola Tigers in honour of the famous story. Tantanoola Caves Conservation Park, featuring a spectacular dolomite cave is located nearby.

Australian poet Max Harris wrote a poem titled "The Tantanoola Tiger", which is included in the collection The Angry Penguin: the Poetry of Max Harris, published by the National Library of Australia.

== Snuggery ==
The next station northwest along the railway line was Snuggery. Snuggery is not recognised as a separate town, but is part of Tantanoola towards Millicent. The area includes the Snuggery Power Station with three diesel-powered gas turbines, and the Kimberly-Clark woodchip and paper pulp mill. The pulp mill was commissioned in 1992 but ceased operations in 2011. It was demolished in November 2012.

== See also ==
- Gower Conservation Park
