= District Council of Millicent =

District Council of Millicent South Australia
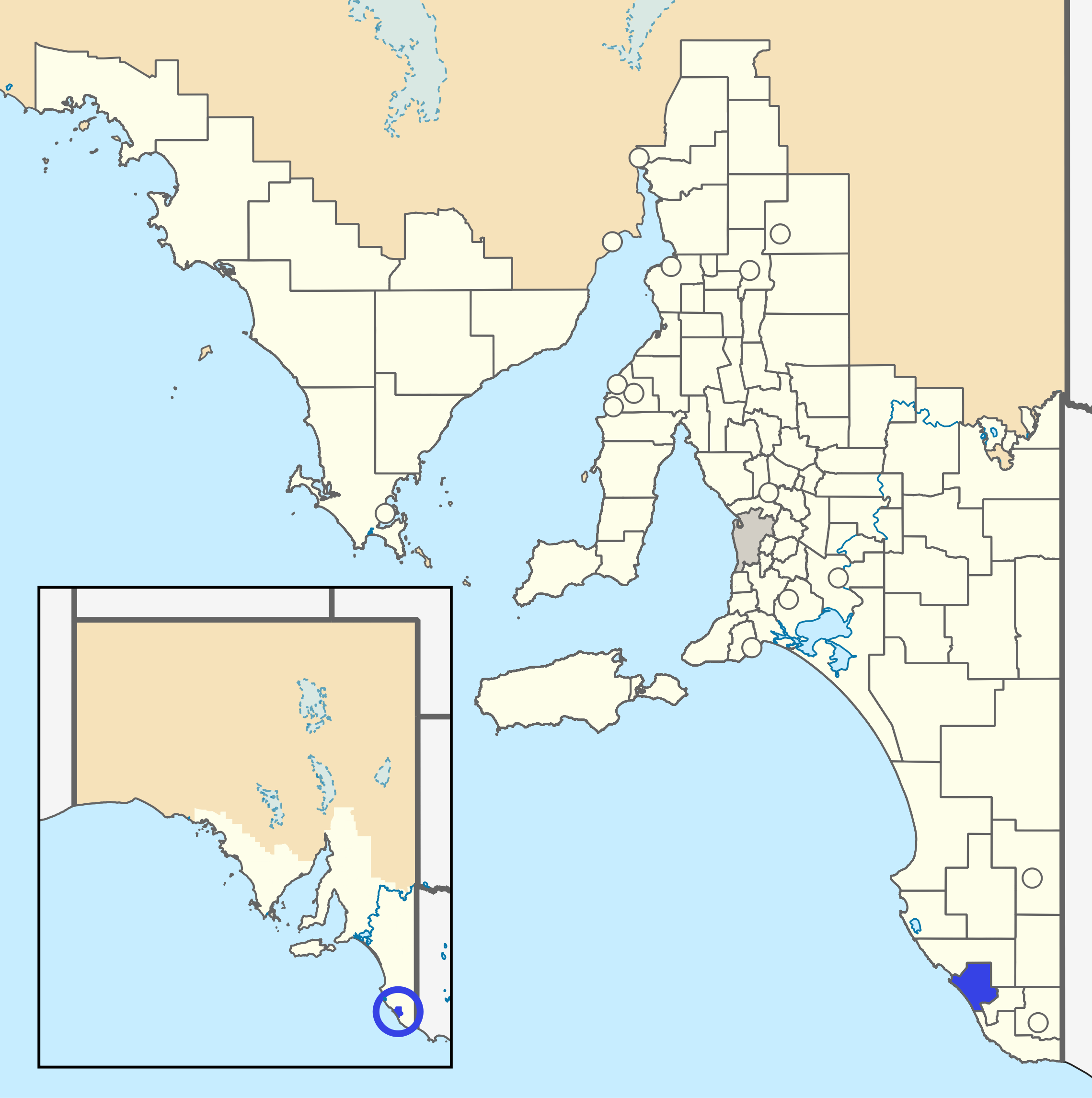
- The District Council of Millicent as it was in 1970 (blue)
- Coordinates: 37°35′48″S 140°21′09″E
- Established: 1888
- Abolished: 1997
- Council seat: Millicent
LGAs around District Council of Millicent:
Beachport	Mount Muirhead	Kennion
	Mayurra / Millicent	Tantanoola
		Tantanoola

The District Council of Millicent (formerly the District Council of Mayurra) was a local government area in South Australia seated at Millicent.

== History ==
According to South Australian local government historian Sue Marsden "development of South Australia's South East was greatly helped by drainage schemes. Elsewhere in South Australia the Local Board of Main Roads was the precursor to local government, but in the South East it was district drainage boards." The original South-East Drainage District was formed in April 1876. Over the next five years parts were split off to form new drainage districts. The Mayurra Drainage District was established on 27 April 1882 in the vicinity of the Hundred of Mayurra and the township of Millicent, which lies across the hundred northern border in the Hundred of Mount Muirhead.

The District Council of Mayurra was established in 1888 by the enactment of the District Councils Act 1887, a statewide legislative push to ensure all settled areas of the state be under local governance. It stated that all existing drainage districts (and the accompanying drainage boards) were to effectively become district councils.

In 1903 the council name was changed from Mayurra to Millicent.

On 4 June 1914, Millicent annexed the District Council of Mount Muirhead. The enlarged council area was divided into five wards: Central, Mayurra, Mount Muirhead, Nangula, and Rendlesham.

The council amalgamated with the District Council of Beachport and District Council of Penola in 1997 to form the Wattle Range Council.
