= Kalangadoo, South Australia =

Kalangadoo South Australia
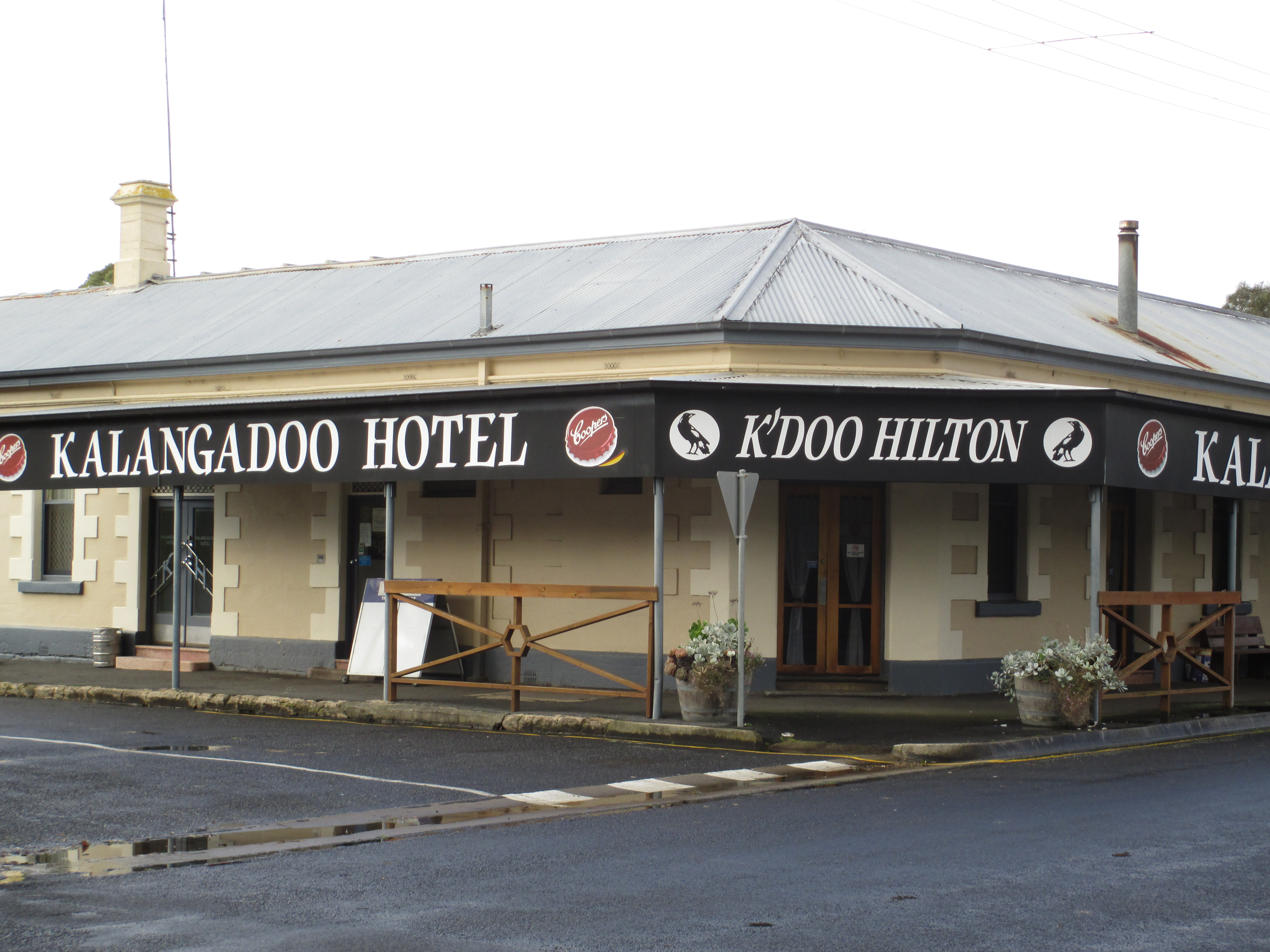
- Kalangadoo Hotel

- Coordinates: 37°33′S 140°42′E
- Population: 287 (UCL 2021)
- Established: 1891 (town); 13 December 2001 (locality)
- Postcode(s): 5278
- Time zone: ACST (UTC+9:30)
  - Summer (DST): ACDT (UTC+10:30)
- Location: 348 km (216 mi) south-east of Adelaide; 31 km (19 mi) north of Mount Gambier
- LGA(s): Wattle Range Council
- Region: Limestone Coast
- County: Grey
- State electorate(s): MacKillop
- Federal division(s): Barker
Mean max temp	Mean min temp	Annual rainfall
19.0 °C; 66 °F	8.2 °C; 47 °F	712.4 mm 28 in
Localities around Kalangadoo:
Wattle Range	Wattle Range East; Moerlong; Krongart	Nangwarry
Mount McIntyre; Koorine	Kalangadoo	Nangwarry
Koorine	Koorine; Wepar	Nangwarry
- Footnotes: Adjoining localities Locations

Kalangadoo, formerly Kalangadoo East, is a locality in the Australian state of South Australia located about 348 kilometres (216 mi) south-east of the state capital of Adelaide and about 31 kilometres (19 mi) north of the regional centre of Mount Gambier.

== History ==
The town was originally proclaimed as Kalangadoo East in 1891. An Aboriginal word, the name means "big trees in water."

The town grew around the Kalangadoo railway station on the Mount Gambier railway line, which ran between Naracoorte and Mount Gambier, and was opened in 1887.

The village flourished after the narrow gauge railway arrived in 1887, and the public school was established in 1892. The railway station was built in 1907.

The name was changed to Kalangadoo in 1940, but after World War II the town languished, as farmers used their cars to shop in Penola and Mount Gambier.

The public school reached a peak enrolment of 150 pupils in 1966, falling to 74 by 1991.

The railway station closed in 1985, although the railway line continued to carry trains past the town. The station remained empty until 1999, when the local mill bought it for use as a retail outlet for timber. The line closed to freight on 12 April 1995, but tourist trains continued to be run by the Limestone Coast Railway, until they too ceased running, on 1 July 2006.

The old timber mill was purchased by Sydney company Shield Formply in 2016 with plans to transform the plant and create new jobs. It was planned that the mill would use locally-grown blue gum and pine to manufacture wood veneer for export.

The town has a community club, which serves as a home ground the Kalangadoo Football Club, Kalangadoo Netball Club, Kalangadoo Cricket Club & Kalangadoo Bowls Club. In 2021, an upgrade to facilities was unveiled

== Description ==
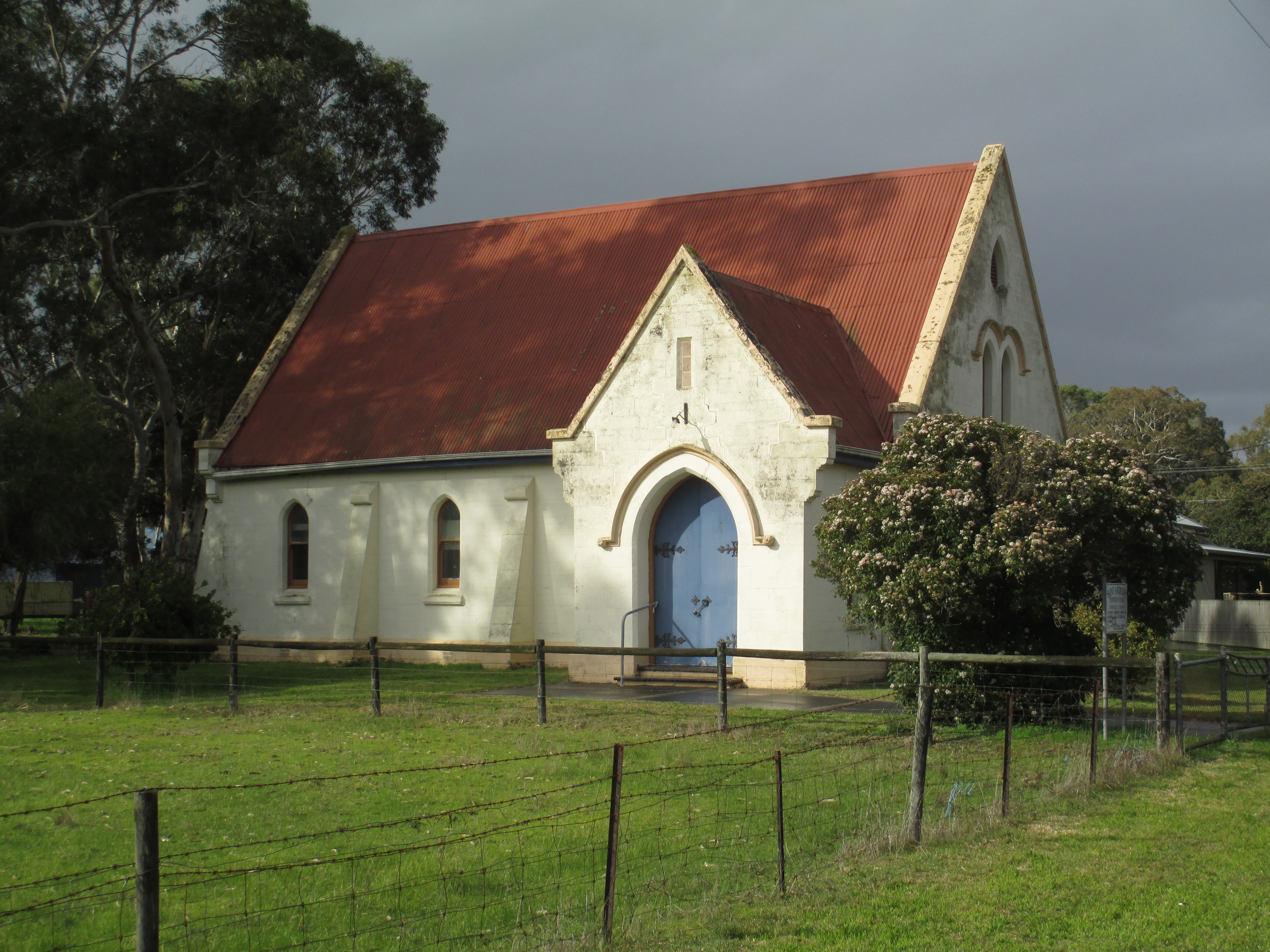
Saint Andrews Presbyterian Church, Kalangadoo

Kalangadoo is the centre of a rich agricultural district that specialises in potatoes and timber, as well as apple orchards, beef cattle, sheep and dairy cattle. Today the small business district includes a general store, a farm supply store, a pub, and a timber mill.

At the 2016 Australian census, the state suburb of Kalangadoo had a population of 473, while the locality had 288.

The Anglican Church of St Alban the Martyr is the only active church, because the Catholic church, built in 1904, is seldom used, and the Presbyterian church, which opened 1914, is now a bed and breakfast. What became the Uniting Church opened in 1906 and closed in 2007, with its old buildings used for the weekly farmers' market.

As of 2022 enrolment at Kalangadoo Primary School was 27, with pupils split into two classes.

The disused railway station houses a small museum created in 2011 and run by former stationmaster and railway enthusiast Peter Savage, who has collected memorabilia relating to the station from all over the country.

The historic Kalangadoo House, off the Kalangadoo-Nangwarry Road, is on the South Australian Heritage Register.

== Governance ==
Kalangadoo is located within the federal division of Barker, the state electoral district of MacKillop, and the local government area of Wattle Range Council.
