= Mount Burr, South Australia =

Mount Burr
- Town
- Coordinates: 37°32′29″S 140°27′26″E
- Country: Australia
- State: South Australia
- LGA: Wattle Range Council
- Location: 55 km (34 mi) NW of Mount Gambier
- Established: 1844

Government
  - State electorate: MacKillop
  - Federal division: Barker
- Elevation: 67 m (220 ft)

Population
  - Total: 324 (UCL 2021)
- Time zone: UTC+9:30 (ACST)
  - Summer (DST): UTC+10:30 (ACST)
- Postcode: 5279
Localities around Mount Burr
Furner	Wattle Range	Wattle Range; Mount McIntyre
Furner; Sebastopol; Rocky Camp	Mount Burr	Mount McIntyre
Rocky Camp; Tantanoola	Tantanoola	Mount McIntyre; Tantanoola

Mount Burr is a small town in the south-east of South Australia, about 10 km (6.2 mi) east of Millicent and about 55 km (34 mi) north-west of Mount Gambier, in the Limestone Coast region. It derives its name from a nearby mountain, Mount Burr.

== History ==
The nearby mountain was named Mount Burr by Governor George Grey after George Dominicus Burr, a surveyor and Professor of Mathematics at Sandhurst Military College. His son, Thomas Burr, a surveyor, accompanied Governor Grey on the expedition to Mount Gambier in 1844:

7 May 1844: At about 2pm we made the top of a range, the principal summit of which his Excellency has done me the honour to call after my father. The Mount Burr range is about 1600 feet above the level of the sea...

— Mr Thos. Burr, Dep Surv.-Gen.

Also in the surveying party was artist George French Angas.

In 1873, an Act of Parliament was passed which encouraged the planting of forests, and the South Australian Department of Woods and Forests was quite likely the first government forestry department created in the British Commonwealth. The first trees planted included not only the native eucalypts, but also hardwoods from Europe and conifers from Europe and North America. The radiata pine, native to California, proved especially successful, and huge numbers were planted.

The town of Mount Burr was established in 1931, home to a large timber mill which was the first of its kind in the area. The town and all of its facilities were built by the Government of South Australia in the middle of a forest, mostly using locally sawn timber.

A cricket and football club were established in 1932 and 1940 respectively.

In October 1965, when the first regional South Australian commercial television station, SES-8, located at Mount Gambier, was readying for transmission in the South-east, a tensioning cable on a 500 ft (150 m) transmitter mast broke, and the steel tower crashed to the ground. Fortunately nobody was seriously injured and the launch went ahead in March 1966. SES-8 was sold to WIN Television in 1999, and regional broadcasting from Mt Gambier ceased in 2013.

In late 2000 the timber mill closed.

== Geography ==
The town is named after a local mountain called Mount Burr, which it measures 240 metres (790 feet) tall and is a dormant volcano. Mount Burr lies within the Limestone Coast region.

The mountain of Mount Burr is home to the SES-8 television transmitter, which is responsible for transmitting WIN Television, Seven SA, Ten SA, SBS and ABC television to households across the south-east of SA and western Victoria.

== Facilities, industries and attractions ==
The main industries in the town are forestry, transport and agriculture. Paper manufacturer Kimberly-Clark is a major source of employment.

Mt Burr Primary School caters for children from pre-school age through to Year 7.

Mt Burr Forest is a forest reserve, named after Thomas Burr, deputy surveyor of the town. Within the forest live endangered species such as the southern brown bandicoot, as well as the red-necked wallaby, emus and more than 60 other species of birds.

== Historic buildings ==
The historic Mount Graham Homestead is listed on the South Australian Heritage Register, as is the Noolook Bark Mill, which is within Mt Burr Forest.

== Mount Burr Swamp ==
Mount Burr Swamp is a large, former deep freshwater marsh, managed by Nature Glenelg Trust with the aim of restoring the 300 ha (740-acre) wetlands which lie adjacent to The Marshes Wetland Complex. Mount Burr Swamp is an area of great biodiversity, providing habitat for little galaxias (fish), growling grass frog, Australasian bitterns, southern brown bandicoots, red-tailed black cockatoos, brolgas and southern bent-wing bats.

In mid-2021, students from the University of South Australia's 18-month Aboriginal Pathways Program accompanied local Aboriginal elders on a land management course at the swamp. Traditional methods of conservation are taught, and the students are experience connection to country and caring for country.

== See also ==
- Burr (disambiguation)
