= County of Grey =

Grey South Australia
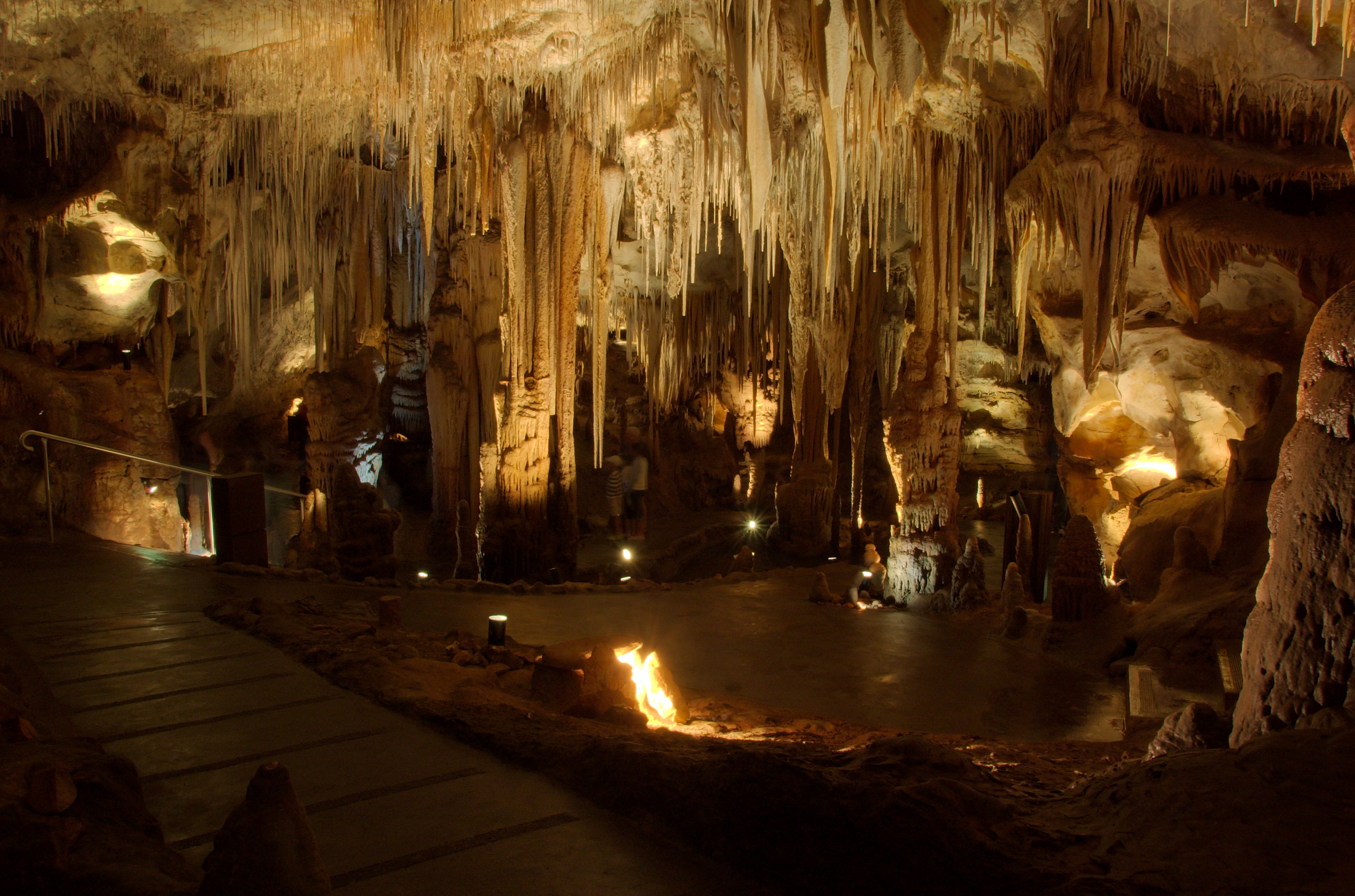
- Dolomite formations in Tantanoola Caves within the Hundred of Hindmarsh

- Coordinates: 37.65°S 140.64°E
- Established: 23 July 1846
- Area: 5,294 km^{2} (2,044.0 sq mi)
- LGA(s): District Council of Grant; City of Mount Gambier; Wattle Range Council
Lands administrative divisions around Grey:
Ocean	Robe	Lowan (Vic)
Ocean	Grey	Follett (Vic)
Ocean	Ocean	Normanby (Vic)

The County of Grey is one of the 49 cadastral counties of South Australia. It was proclaimed in 1846 by Governor Frederick Robe and named for former Governor George Grey. It covers the extreme south-east of the state from Penola and Lake George southwards. This includes the following contemporary local government areas of the state:

- Wattle Range Council (most part)
- District Council of Grant
- City of Mount Gambier

== Hundreds ==
The County of Grey is divided into the following 21 hundreds:

- Hundred of Lake George (Lake George)
- Hundred of Symon (Thornlea)
- Hundred of Kennion (Furner)
- Hundred of Short (Wattle Range)
- Hundred of Monbulla (Monbulla)
- Hundred of Penola (Penola)
- Hundred of Rivoli Bay (Beachport)
- Hundred of Mount Muirhead (Millicent)
- Hundred of Riddoch (Mount McIntyre)
- Hundred of Grey (Kalangadoo)
- Hundred of Nangwarry (Nangwarry)
- Hundred of Mayurra (Canunda)
- Hundred of Hindmarsh (Tantanoola)
- Hundred of Young (Dismal Swamp)
- Hundred of Mingbool (Mingbool)
- Hundred of Benara (German Creek)
- Hundred of Blanche (Mount Gambier, Compton)
- Hundred of Gambier (Glenburnie)
- Hundred of Kongorong (Kongorong)
- Hundred of MacDonnell (Allendale East)
- Hundred of Caroline (Caroline)
