= District Councils Act 1887 =

The District Councils Act 1887 was an act of the Parliament of South Australia. It received assent on 9 December 1887, and its provisions came into effect when proclaimed by Governor William C. F. Robinson on 5 January 1888.

The legislation introduced local government to many areas of South Australia in which it had not previously existed, especially in the north and west of the state, and involved substantial change to many existing municipalities. In total, it involved the creation of 20 new councils, the expansion of 35 existing councils into lands previously without local government, and the amalgamation of 17 pre-existing councils into eight larger councils. The remaining existing councils were left unchanged, as were individual incorporated towns. The legislation fixed both a minimum number of five councillors and a maximum of ten councillors for District Councils across the state. The Governor appointed councillors for all of the new councils, to hold office for six months until elections could be held in July: these councillors were required to determine their own wards, assess the rateable property and prepare rolls of ratepayers.

The financial impact of the legislation had been a source of controversy both before and after its passage by parliament, and several northern councils protested to the government in 1888 about the arrangements for subsidies and license fees, arguing that they were inadequate to meet the cost of establishing the municipalities. There was lingering dissent around the authority of councils, in particular over the control of dams, wells and reservoirs, which the legislation had maintained as a state government responsibility. The individual councillors chosen by the Governor also met with staunch opposition in some districts, while the administrative impact of changes to councils already in office was the subject of debate at a local level.

Three of the councils created by the act remain today: Elliston, Franklin Harbour and Streaky Bay.

== Councils created ==
A total of 20 new district councils were created, bringing local government to huge swathes of unincorporated land.

- District Council of Blanchetown
- District Council of Broughton
- District Council of Coglin
- District Council of Davenport
- District Council of Elliston
- District Council of Eurelia
- District Council of Franklin Harbour
- District Council of Hawker
- District Council of Kanyaka
- District Council of Kingscote
- District Council of Meningie
- District Council of Minlaton
- District Council of Morgan
- District Council of Orroroo
- District Council of Port Germein
- District Council of Snowtown
- District Council of Streaky Bay
- District Council of Terowie
- District Council of Wilmington
- District Council of Yorke Peninsula

== Amalgamations ==
16 pre-existing district councils were amalgamated to form eight.

- The District Council of Alexandrina was amalgamated into the existing District Council of Bremer along with the previously unincorporated Hundred of Brinkley.
- The District Council of Barossa East and the District Council of Barossa West were amalgamated into the new District Council of Barossa.
- The District Council of Black Springs was amalgamated into the existing District Council of Stanley.
- The District Council of Flaxman's Valley was amalgamated into the existing District Council of South Rhine.
- The District Council of Glanville was amalgamated into the existing District Council of Woodville.
- The District Council of Myponga was amalgamated into the existing District Council of Yankalilla.
- The District Council of Narridy was amalgamated into the existing District Council of Georgetown along with the unincorporated portions of the hundreds of Yackamoorundie and Bundaleer.
- The District Council of Wirrega was amalgamated into the existing District Council of Tatiara along with the unincorporated portion of the Hundred of Tatiara, the hundreds of Parsons and Stirling, the as yet ungazetted hundreds of Willalooka, Pendleton, Cannawigara and Senior in the County of Buckingham, and the as yet ungazetted hundreds of Beeamma and Geegeela in the County of MacDonnell.

== Councils expanded ==
A total of 35 district councils were expanded in an effort to ensure unincorporated portions of settled lands would be subject to local government.

- The District Council of Queenstown and Alberton gained a small portion of the Hundred of Yatala south of the Corporate Town of Port Adelaide and north west of the present-day suburb of Queenstown.
- The District Council of Munno Para West gained an unincorporated northern portion of the Hundred of Port Adelaide.
- The District Council of Mannum gained the Hundred of Younghusband.
- The District Council of Caurnamont gained the Hundred of Forster.
- The District Council of Port Wakefield gained the Hundred of Cameron.
- The District Council of English gained the Hundred of Bower.
- The District Council of Apoinga gained the hundreds of Bright and Bundey.
- The District Council of Blyth gained the Hundred of Everard.
- The District Council of Green's Plains became the District Council of Kadina and gained all unincorporated portions of the hundreds of Kadina and Wallaroo. The change was not explicitly declared to be a renaming of the existing council, and was the subject of considerable local debate, particularly by ratepayers in the former council of Green's Plains.
- The District Council of Clinton gained the Hundred of Tiparra.
- The District Council of Melville gained the hundreds of Carribie, Coonarie, Para Wurlie and Warrenben, and the unincorporated portion of the Hundred of Moorowie.
- The District Council of Ninnes gained the hundreds of Tickera and Wiltunga.
- The District Council of Hutt and Hill Rivers gained the Hundred of Hart.
- The District Council of Booborowie gained the Hundred of Anne.
- The District Council of Caltowie gained the Hundred of Tarcowie.
- The District Council of Crystal Brook gained the unincorporated portions of the hundreds of Pirie and Crystal Brook, the hundreds of Napperby and Wandearah, and a southern portion of the Wirrabara Forest Reserve (the as yet ungazetted Hundred of Howe).
- The District Council of Gladstone gained the unincorporated portion of the Hundred of Yangya.
- The District Council of Belalie gained the Hundred of Whyte and the unincorporated portion of the Hundred of Belalie.
- The District Council of Yongala gained the hundreds of Morgan and Mannanarie.
- The District Council of Hallett gained the Hundred of Tomkinson and the unincorporated portion of the Hundred of Hallett.
- The District Council of Mount Bryan gained the hundreds of Mongolata and Rees.
- The District Council of Burra gained the hundreds of Baldina and King.
- The District Council of Lacepede gained the unincorporated portion of the hundred of Lacepede, the hundreds of Bowaka, Duffield, Minecrow, Mount Benson and Murrabinna, and the as yet ungazetted hundreds of Landseer, Peacock, Marcollat and Woolumbool in the County of MacDonnell.
- The District Council of Naracoorte gained the hundreds of Binnum, Glen Roy, Hynam, Jessie, Joanna, Lochaber, and Robertson.
- The District Council of Lucindale gained the hundreds of Conmurra, Spence and Townsend.
- The District Council of Robe gained the hundreds of Bray, Ross and Smith, and the unincorporated portion of the Hundred of Waterhouse.
- The District Council of Beachport gain the Hundred of Symon and the unincorporated portion of the Hundred of Lake George and a central unincorporated portion of the Hundred of Rivoli Bay.
- The District Council of Kennion gained the hundreds of Coles, Fox, Riddoch and Short.
- The District Council of Mount Muirhead was expanded from the pre-existing Drainage District of Mount Muirhead, gaining a portion of the Hundred of Mount Muirhead and the remaining unincorporated southern portion of the Hundred of Rivoli Bay "south of the cutting from Lake Frome to the sea".
- The District Council of Tantanoola was expanded from the pre-existing Drainage District of Tantanoola, gaining the remaining portion of the unincorporated portion of the Hundred of Hindmarsh.
- The District Council of Penola gained the hundreds of Comaum, Grey, Killanoola, Monbulla, Nangwarry, and the unincorporated portion of the Hundred of Penola.
- The District Council of Mount Gambier East gained the Hundred of Mingbool.
- The District Council of Mount Gambier West gained the Hundred of Young.
- The District Council of Port MacDonnell gained the remaining unincorporated portion of the Hundred of Caroline.
- The District Council of Lincoln gained the entire remaining unincorporated portion of the County of Flinders.

== See also ==
- Local Government Areas (Re-arrangement) Acts 1929 and 1931
