= Hundred of Townsend =

Townsend
- Cadastral division
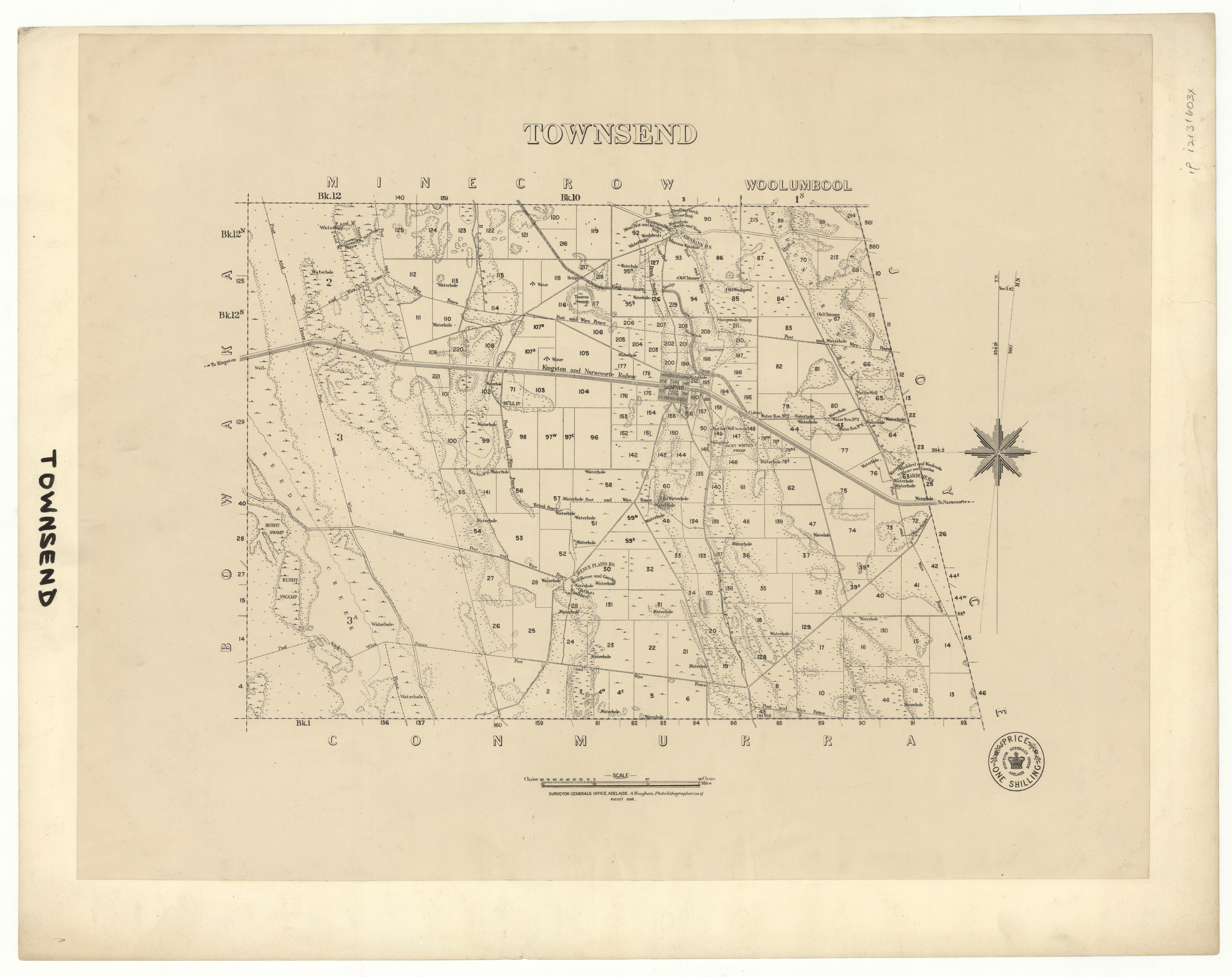
- Plan of the Hundred of Townsend in 1885

- Coordinates: 36.967°S 140.204°E
- Country: Australia
- State: South Australia
- Region: Limestone Coast
- LGA(s): Naracoorte Lucindale
- Established: 11 April 1878

Area
  - Total: 310 km^{2} (119 sq mi)
- County: Robe
Lands administrative divisions around Townsend
Murrabinna	Minecrow	Woolumbool
Bowaka	Townsend	Joyce
Ross	Conmurra	Joyce

The Hundred of Townsend is a cadastral unit of hundred located in the Limestone Coast region in the south-east of South Australia.

It is one of the 18 hundreds of the County of Robe. It was named in April 1878 by Governor William Jervois for South Australian settler and member of parliament, William Townsend.

There are no townships within the hundred, the nearest township being that of Lucindale about 5 kilometres (3.1 mi) east of the central eastern border of the hundred. The Government Town of Downer, also known as Avenue for the "parallel arrangement of the swamp flats and stringybark ridges in the area", was surveyed and proclaimed within the hundred on 9 December 1886. The town failed to develop. The Avenue Railway Station had been established at the planned town site on the Kingston-Naracoorte railway line since 1876. In 1940 the name of the locality was officially changed to Avenue with the modern bounded locality of Avenue Range now surrounding the planned town site and covering all land in the hundred apart from a strip on the eastern side which sits in the bounded locality of Lucindale.

== Local government ==
In 1888 the Hundred of Townsend was annexed to the District Council of Lucindale as part of the District Councils Act 1887. In 1998 it became part of the Naracoorte Lucindale Council following the amalgamation of Lucindale with the District Council of Naracoorte.

== See also ==
- Lands administrative divisions of South Australia
