= Stewart Range, South Australia =

Stewart Range South Australia
- Coordinates: 36°57′40″S 140°35′43″E
- Population: 67 (2016 census)
- Established: 29 April 1886 (town); 3 December 1998 (locality)
- Postcode(s): 5271
- Elevation: 45 m (148 ft)(railway station)
- Time zone: ACST (UTC+9:30)
  - Summer (DST): ACST (UTC+10:30)
- Location: 289 km (180 mi) south-east of Adelaide; 12 km (7 mi) west of Naracoorte
- LGA(s): Naracoorte Lucindale Council
- Region: Limestone Coast
- County: Robe
- State electorate(s): MacKillop
- Federal division(s): Barker
Mean max temp	Mean min temp	Annual rainfall
21.6 °C; 71 °F	8.1 °C; 47 °F	484.0 mm 19.1 in
Suburbs around Stewart Range:
Lucindale	Lochaber	Lochaber
Lucindale	Stewart Range	Naracoorte
Lucindale	Spence; Moyhall	Moyhall
- Footnotes: Locations; Adjoining localities

Stewart Range (formerly Stewarts and Tryon) is a locality in the Australian state of South Australia located about 289 kilometres (180 mi) south-east of the state capital of Adelaide and about 12 kilometres (7.5 mi) west of the municipal seat of Naracoorte.

Stewart Range came in existence as a government town which was proclaimed with the name Tryon on 29 April 1886. It was renamed as Stewarts in 1940. Boundaries for the locality within the former District Council of Lucindale were created in 1998 which includes “the Government Town of Stewarts“ and was given the “long established name” which was derived from a range of hills known as Stewart Range. The portion within the Naracoorte Lucindale Council was added on 12 April 2001. A school named as "Stewart's Range" opened in 1885 and closed in 1945 after a name change in 1941. The western two-thirds of the locality is roughly the northern half of the Hundred of Spence. The eastern portion is part of the Hundred of Naracoorte.

The Stewarts railway station opened on the narrow gauge Kingston-Naracoorte railway line in 1876. The railway was converted to broad gauge in 1957 and closed in 1987. It was dismantled in 1991.

The principal land use in the locality is primary production.

The 2016 Australian census which was conducted in August 2016 reports that Stewart Range had a population of 67 people.

Stewart Range is located within the federal division of Barker, the state electoral district of MacKillop and the local government area of the Naracoorte Lucindale Council.
