= District Council of Lucindale =

District Council of Lucindale South Australia
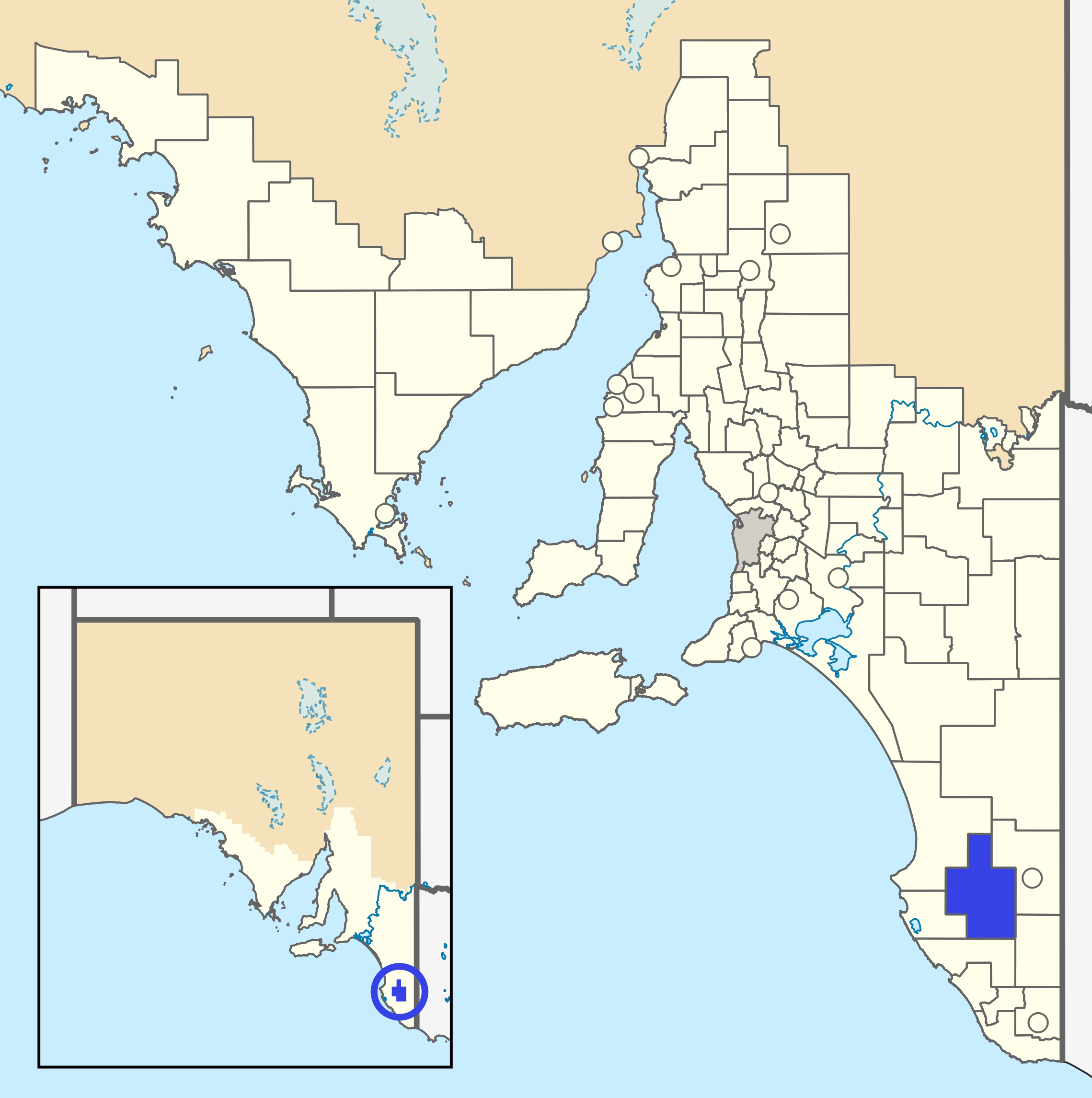
- The District Council of Lucindale as it was prior to disestablishment (blue)
- Coordinates: 36°59′0″S 140°22′0″E
- Population: 1,700 (1985)
  - Density: 0.719/km^{2} (1.86/sq mi)
- Established: 1878
- Abolished: 1998
- Area: 2,363.4 km^{2} (912.5 sq mi)(1985)
- Council seat: Lucindale

The District Council of Lucindale was a local government area in the Australian state of South Australia that existed from 1878 to 1998 on land in the state’s south-east.

It was proclaimed on 28 February 1878 with its seat being located in the town of Lucindale.

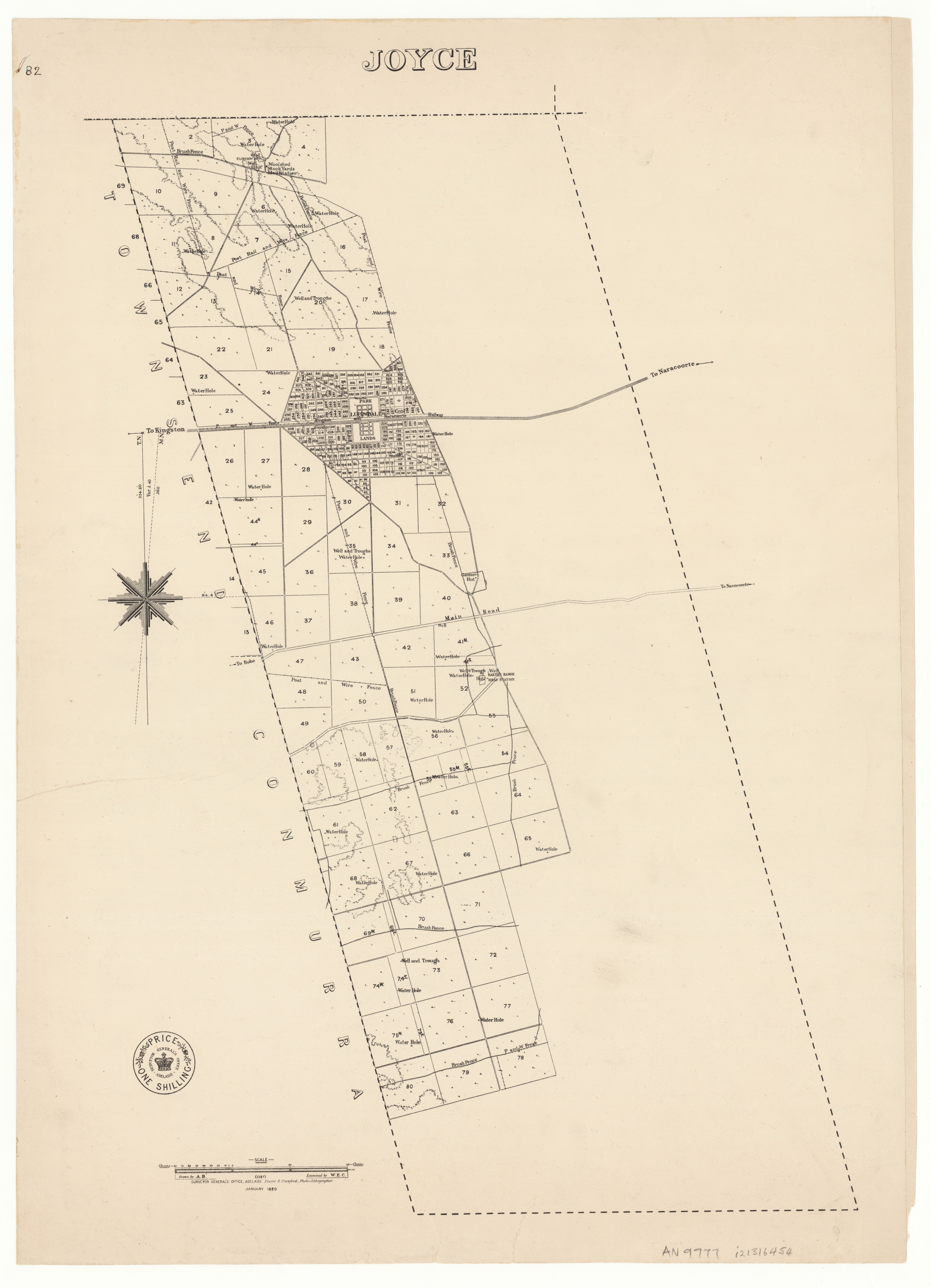
The district originally consisted of the Hundred of Joyce

At establishment, it consisted of the whole of the Hundred of Joyce. By 1985, the district's extent had grown by the addition of the following six hundreds - Coles, Conmurra, Fox, Spence, Townsend and Woolumbool. As of 1985, the population of each hundred was represented by a ward whose boundary aligned with the respective hundred, with an eighth ward representing the population of the Town of Lucindale.

On 1 December 1998, it was amalgamated with the District Council of Naracoorte to create the Naracoorte Lucindale Council.

== Chairmen ==
The following persons were elected to serve as chairman of the council for the following terms:

1. J.McCallum (1878-?)
2. G. Copping (? - ?)
3. A. Robson (? - ?)
4. E. Hall (? - ?)
5. S. Tavender (? - ?)
6. E. Feurheerdt (? - ?)
7. D. Findlater (? - ?)
8. P.J. Burke (? - 1923)
9. Aitchison Grieve (1923-49)
10. Ratcliffe George Nosworthy (1949-52)
11. Geoffrey Trafford Cowan (1952-57)
12. Peter William Robertson Daw (1957-63)
13. Horace William Mason (1963-77)
14. Kenneth Ralph James OAM (1977-85)
