= Mary Seymour Conservation Park =

Protected area in South Australia

- IUCN category III (natural monument or feature)
- Location within South Australia
- Location: South Australia
- Nearest city: Naracoorte
- Coordinates: 37°10′11″S 140°37′24″E
- Area: 3.4 km^{2} (1.3 sq mi)
- Established: 18 September 1980
- Visitors: "low" (in 1992)
- Governing body: Department for Environment and Water

Mary Seymour Conservation Park is a protected area in the Australian state of South Australia located in the south-east of the state in the gazetted locality of Bool Lagoon about 25 kilometres (16 mi) south-west of the town centre of Naracoorte.

The conservation park occupies land in sections 199, 200 and 365 of the cadastral unit of the Hundred of Robertson. It is bounded by the Coles-Killanoola Road to the west and by the Bool Lagoon West Road to the north while the land reserved for roads on its east and south boundaries have not been developed as of 1992.

A drain known as "Killanoola Drain", which is part of the drainage infrastructure built in the south east of the state since European settlement, passes through the eastern quarter of the conservation park, carrying water to a drain known as "Drain M" located to the north and which terminates in the sea at Beachport in the south. The presence of the drain is reported as having “modified the natural water regime of the wetland system” within the conservation park. As of 1992, it included a “former sand quarry and two stone quarries” in its south west corner, a system of yards “which are historically significant remnants of past land use” on its eastern side and a network of tracks to its boundaries and to its interior.

It was proclaimed under the National Parks and Wildlife Act 1972 on 18 September 1980. As of July 2016, it covered an area of 3.4 square kilometres (1.3 sq mi).

In 1992, the conservation park was described as having a landscape consisting of a limestone ridge in its “western quarter” while its remainder is a “complex wetland system, with limestone outcrops”. It supports the following “distinct vegetation types” with one type in the “western quarter” and three types within the wetland system:

1. the “western quarter” supports a “low open forest of brown stringybark … and pink gum … associations over a sparse low shrub layer”.
2. “a two strata mid-dense low shrub formation of mallee honey-myrtle (Melaleuca neglecta) with cutting grass … over a sparse tussock grass and dwarf shrub stratum dominated by bare twig-rush (Machaerinajuncea) and small darwinia …;”
3. “a two strata low shrub formation of prickly tea-tree and mallee honey-myrtle over a sparse dwarf shrub layer dominated by clustered sword-sedge (Lepidospefllla congestum), bare twigrush, running marsh-flower (Villarsia reniformis), and prickly tea-tree; and”
4. ”an isolated tree formation of South Australian blue gum … , pink gum and river red gum …, over a sparse ground stratum of clustered sword-sedge and bare twig-rush with annual grasses and forbs”.

As of 1992, visitor use as reported as being “low” with visitors consisting mainly of “members of the local and Naracoorte communities for nature study, with the former sand quarry used regularly for picnicking” and with camping being “an occasional activity” for which sites and associated facilities were absent.

The conservation park is classified as an IUCN Category III protected area.

== See also ==
- Protected areas of South Australia
