= Hacks Lagoon Conservation Park =

Protected area in South Australia

- IUCN category IV (habitat/species management area)
- Location within South Australia
- Location: South Australia, Bool Lagoon
- Nearest city: Naracoorte
- Coordinates: 37°06′04″S 140°43′23″E
- Area: 2.02 km^{2} (0.78 sq mi)
- Established: 8 June 1967
- Governing body: Department for Environment and Water
- Website: Official website

Hacks Lagoon Conservation Park is a protected area in the Australian state of South Australia located in the locality of Bool Lagoon about 24 kilometres (15 miles) south of the municipal seat of Naracoorte.

The conservation park consists of land in sections 249, 372, 373, 379, 382, and 383 of the cadastral unit of the Hundred of Robertson. The land acquired protected area status on 8 June 1967 simultaneously as a fauna reserve declared under the Fauna Conservation Act, 1964–1965 and as a Fauna Conservation Reserve under the Crown Lands Act, 1929–1967 along with land in sections 223 and 224. On 27 April 1972, land in section 249 was reconstituted as the Hacks Lagoon Conservation Park under the National Parks and Wildlife Act 1972. In 1985, the area covered by both the conservation park and the adjoining Bool Lagoon Game Reserve was added under the name "Bool and Hacks Lagoons" to the List of Wetlands of International Importance maintained by the Ramsar Convention. Land in sections 373, 379, 382 and 383 was added to the conservation park on 27 August 1992.

The conservation park is classified as an IUCN Category IV protected area. In 1980, it was listed on the now-defunct Register of the National Estate.

== See also ==
- Protected areas of South Australia
