= Moyhall, South Australia =

Moyhall
- Town
- Coordinates: 37°1′57″S 140°39′57″E
- Country: Australia
- State: South Australia
- Region: Limestone Coast
- LGA: Naracoorte Lucindale Council
- Established: 12 April 2001

Government
  - State electorate: MacKillop
  - Federal division: Barker

Population
  - Total: 52 (2021 census)
- Postcode: 5271
- County: Robe
Localities around Moyhall
Stewart Range	Stewart Range; Naracoorte	Naracoorte
Spence	Moyhall	Mount Light; Struan
Spence	Bool Lagoon	Struan

Moyhall is a locality located within the Naracoorte Lucindale Council in the Limestone Coast region of South Australia.
