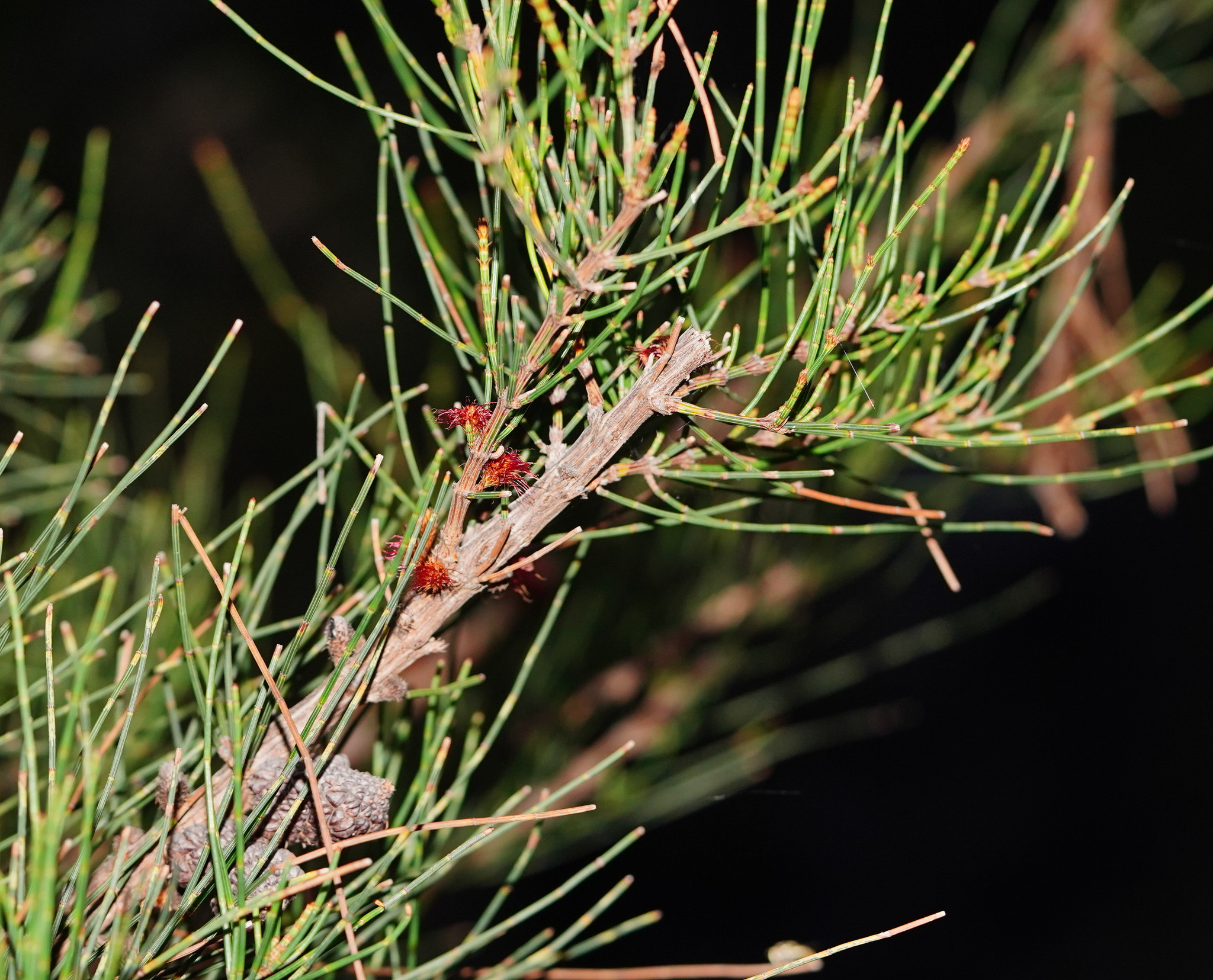
- Branchlets and female cones

Scientific classification
- Kingdom: Plantae
- Clade: Tracheophytes
- Clade: Angiosperms
- Clade: Eudicots
- Clade: Rosids
- Order: Fagales
- Family: Casuarinaceae
- Genus: Allocasuarina
- Species: A. mackliniana

Binomial name
- Allocasuarina mackliniana L.A.S.Johnson
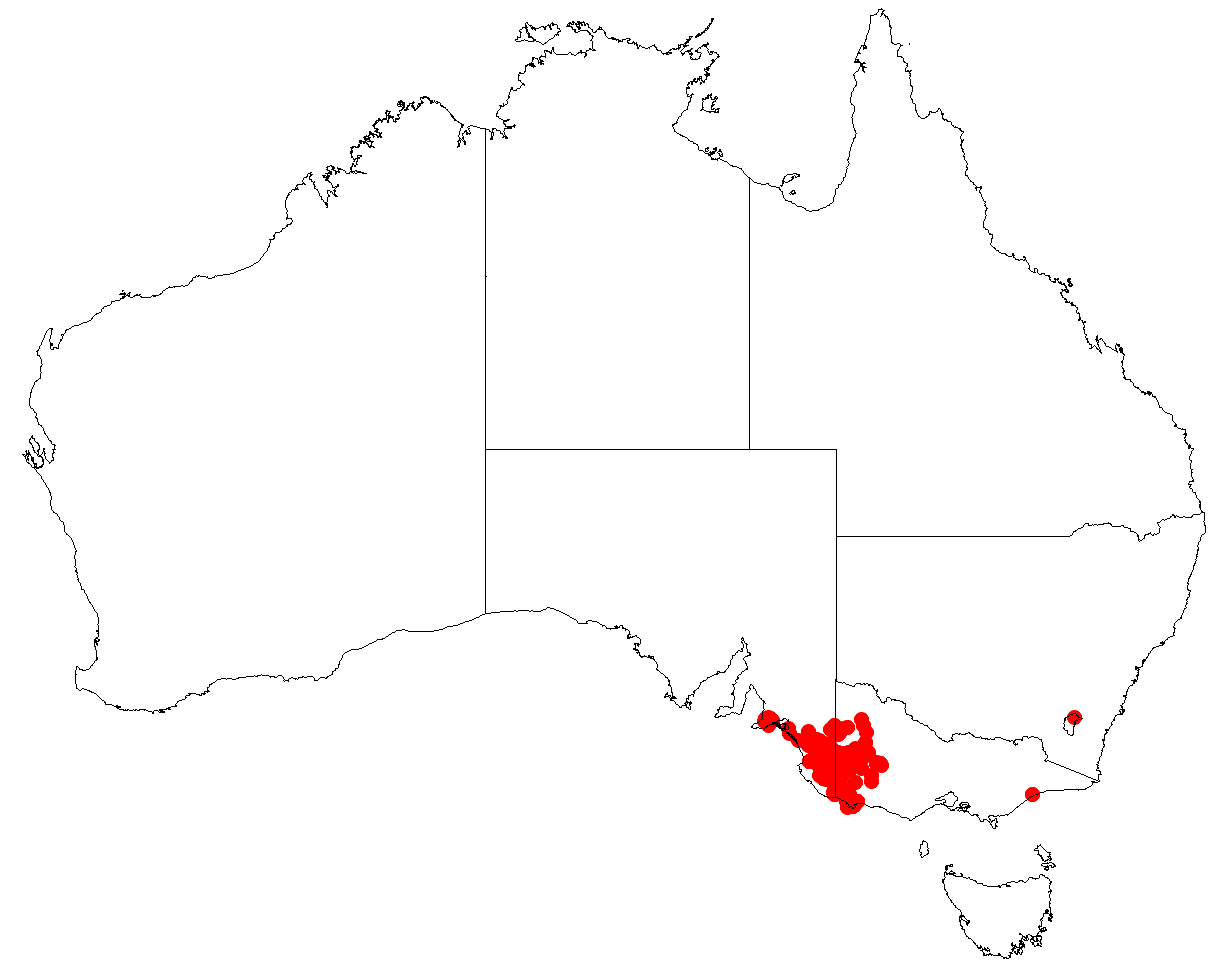
- Occurrence data from AVH

= Allocasuarina mackliniana =

Species of flowering plant

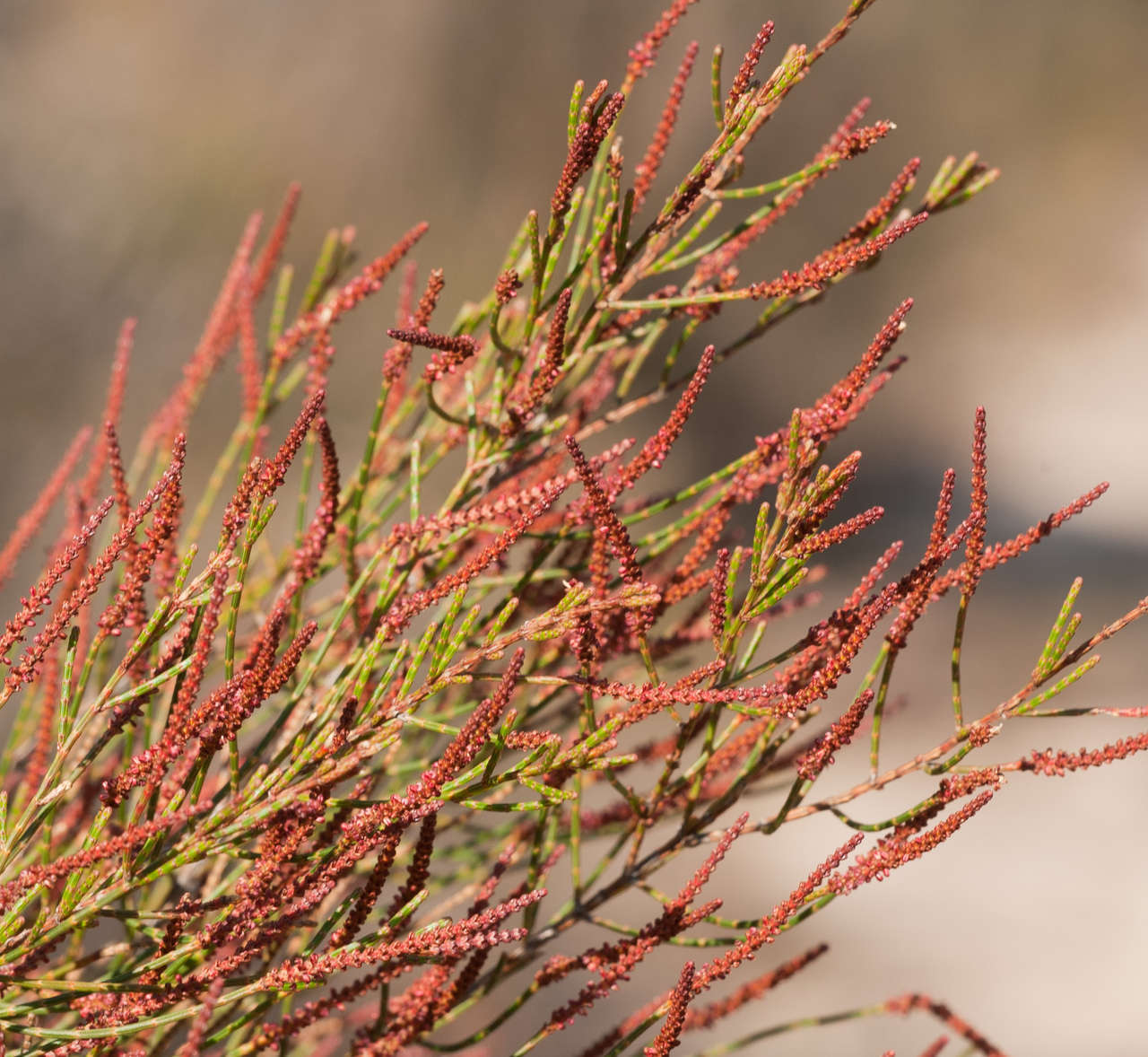
Male spikes of subsp. xerophila

Allocasuarina mackliniana is a species of flowering plant in the family Casuarinaceae and is endemic to southern continental Australia. It is a dioecious, rarely a monoecious shrub that has more or less erect branchlets up to 200 mm (7.9 in) long, the leaves reduced to scales in whorls of seven to ten, the fruiting cones 12–22 mm (0.47–0.87 in) long containing winged seeds (samaras) 5–8 mm (0.20–0.31 in) long.

== Description ==
Allocasuarina mackliniana is a dioecious, or rarely a monoecious shrub that typically grows to a height of 0.5–3 m (1 ft 8 in – 9 ft 10 in) and has smooth bark. Its branchlets are more or less erect, up to 200 mm (7.9 in) long, the leaves reduced to spreading or curved, scale-like teeth 0.7–2 mm (0.028–0.079 in) long, arranged in whorls of seven to ten around the branchlets. The sections of branchlet between the leaf whorls (the "articles") are 7–17 mm (0.28–0.67 in) long, 0.8–1.4 mm (0.031–0.055 in) wide. Male flowers are arranged in thick, dense spikes 10–40 mm (0.39–1.57 in) long, the anthers 0.8–1.5 mm (0.031–0.059 in) long. Female cones are cylindrical and sessile or on a peduncle up to 3 mm (0.12 in) long. Mature cones are cylindrical, mostly 12–22 mm (0.47–0.87 in) long and 8–14 mm (0.31–0.55 in) in diameter, the samaras dark reddish-brown to black, and 5–8 mm (0.20–0.31 in) long.

== Taxonomy ==
Allocasuarina mackliniana was first formally described in 1989 by Lawrie Johnson in the Flora of Australia from specimens collected near Lucindale in 1986. The specific epithet, (mackliniana) honours "Miss Ellen D. Macklin, of Adelaide".

In the same edition of Flora of Australia, Johnson described three subspecies of A. mackliniana, and the names are accepted by the Australian Plant Census:

- Allocasuarina mackliniana subsp. hirtilinea L.A.S.Johnson has articles 11–15 mm (0.43–0.59 in) long, eight or nine teeth, the "ribs" along the articles slightly rounded and the furrows between the ribs softly hairy.
- Allocasuarina mackliniana L.A.S.Johnson subsp. mackliniana has articles 9–17 mm (0.35–0.67 in) long, seven to ten teeth, the "ribs" rounded, the furrows with minute, soft hairs. It is similar to A. paradoxa.
- Allocasuarina mackliniana subsp. xerophila L.A.S.Johnson is intermediate between the other two subspecies, and has articles 7–13 mm (0.28–0.51 in) long, seven or eight teeth, the "ribs" nearly flat to slightly rounded and the furrows between the ribs softly hairy when young.

== Distribution and habitat ==
This sheoak is found from the southern Mount Lofty Ranges in South Australia to western Victoria. Subspecies hirtlinea grows in woodland and is restricted to the western parts of the Grampians National Park. Subspecies mackliniana grows in heath from the southern Mount Lofty Ranges to Portland in Victoria and subsp. xerophila grows in heath from near Pinnaroo and Keith in South Australia to the Wyperfield and Little Desert National Parks in Victoria.
