= Lucindale railway station =

Former railway station in South Australia, Australia

Lucindale
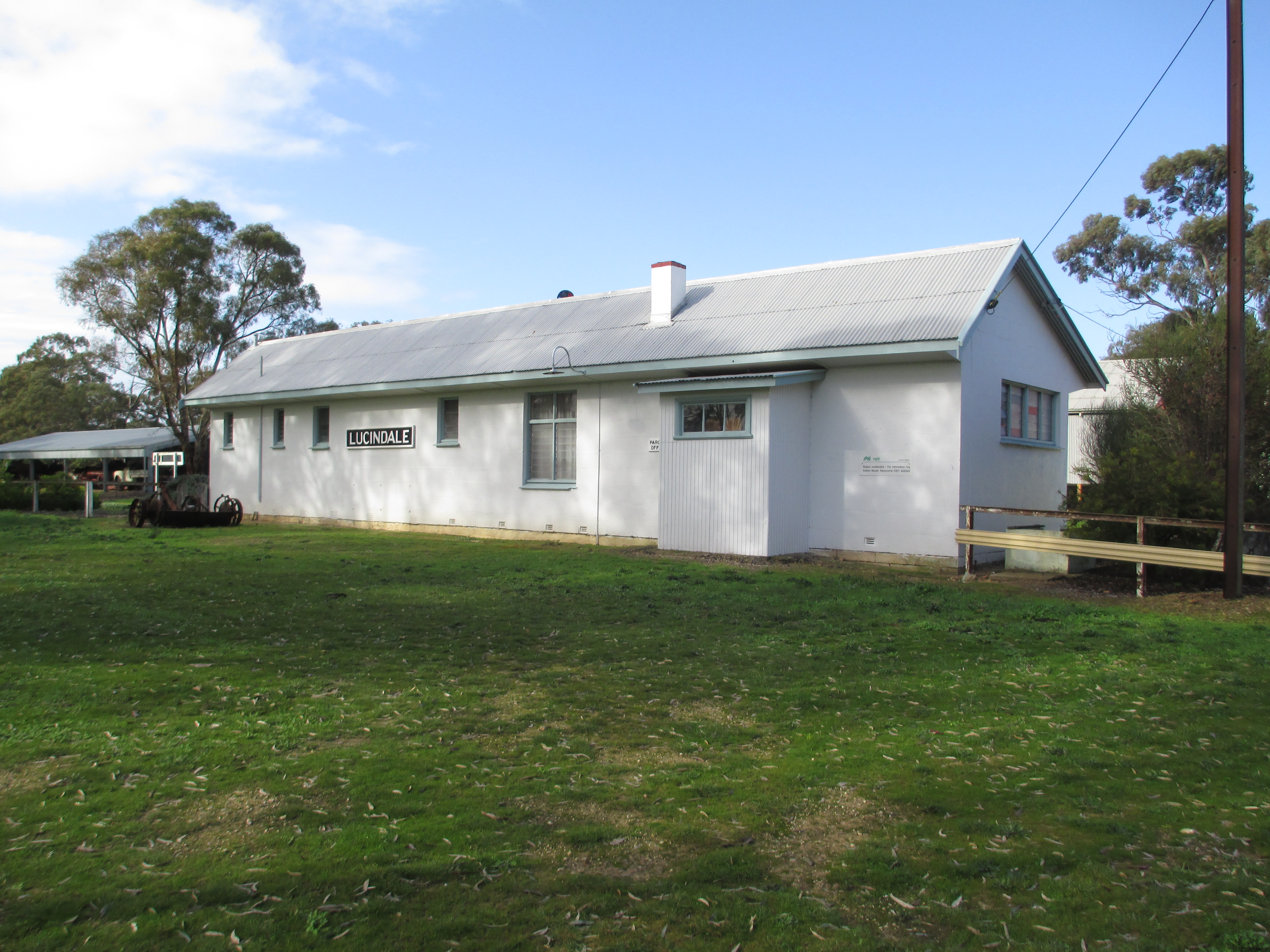
- The former Lucindale railway station (2016)

General information
- Location: Railway Terrace, Lucindale, South Australia
- Coordinates: 36.971727140742594°S 140.37388216656416°E
- Operator: Australian National
- Line: Kingston SE line
- Distance: 345 kilometres from Adelaide
- Platforms: 1
- Tracks: 1

Construction
- Structure type: Ground

Other information
- Status: Closed, repurposed as a museum

History
- Closed: 28 November 1987

Services
Preceding station	Australian National Railways Commission	Following station
Stewarts towards Naracoorte	Kingston-Naracoorte railway line	Avenue towards Kingston SE
Location

Lucindale railway station was located on the Kingston SE railway line. It served the town of Lucindale, South Australia.

== History ==
Lucindale railway station opened in 1876 when a narrow gauge railway line completed in 1876 from the port at Kingston SE inland via Lucindale to Naracoorte. For the first six months after the line was completed, no locomotives were available, so wagons on the line were towed by horses. It was converted to broad gauge with a new terminus one kilometre east of Kingston, on the edge of the port township in 1957. Lucindale station was relocated to the centre of the town when the line was gauge converted. The line through Lucindale was closed on 28 November 1987 and was removed on 15 September 1991; The railway station has since been converted into a museum.
