= Hundred of Bray =

The Hundred of Bray refers to a cadastral unit (land division) of a hundred. It may refer to:

- The Hundred of Bray, in Palmerston County, Northern Territory, Australia
- The Hundred of Bray (South Australia)
- The Hundred of Bray, Berkshire, England
