= Vivigani Ardune Conservation Park =

Protected area in South Australia

- IUCN category III (natural monument or feature)
- Location within South Australia
- Location: South Australia
- Nearest city: Lucindale
- Coordinates: 36°56′03″S 140°17′44″E/
- Area: 41 ha (100 acres)
- Established: 20 March 2008
- Governing body: Department for Environment and Water

Vivigani Ardune Conservation Park is a protected area located in the Australian state of South Australia in the locality of Lucindale about 270 kilometres (170 mi) south-east of the state capital of Adelaide and about 7 kilometres (4.3 mi) north-west of the town of Lucindale.

The conservation park consists of land described as “Allotment 1 of Filed Plan 18259” and which is located in the cadastral unit of the Hundred of Townsend. It came into existence on 20 March 2008 by proclamation under the National Parks and Wildlife Act 1972. The name which was approved on 17 July 2006 is derived from two nearby places – the Vivigani Sanctuary which is a private protected area declared under the above-mentioned act in 1974 and which occupies adjoining land to the conservation park's west, the south and the east, and the Ardune Range, a geographical feature. As of 2016, it covered an area of 41 hectares (100 acres).

In 2008, the conservation park was described by Gail Gago, the Minister for Environment and Conservation, as follows:

Vivigani Ardune Conservation Park is well covered in intact native vegetation and provides an important link between other properties managed for conservation. The land contains regionally threatened vegetation associations (dryland tea-tree woodland and tussock grassland), regionally threatened flora (Blue Devil), and fauna of conservation significance, including the Yellow-tailed Black Cockatoo, the Little Lorikeet, the Diamond Firetail, and the Red-necked Wallaby.

The conservation park is classified as an IUCN Category III protected area.

== See also ==
- Protected areas of South Australia
