= Hundred of Waterhouse =

The Hundred of Waterhouse refers to a cadastral unit (land division). It may refer to:

- Hundred of Waterhouse (Northern Territory)
- Hundred of Waterhouse (South Australia)
