= Hundred of Waterhouse (South Australia) =

Administrative area in South Australia, Australia

Waterhouse
- Cadastral division
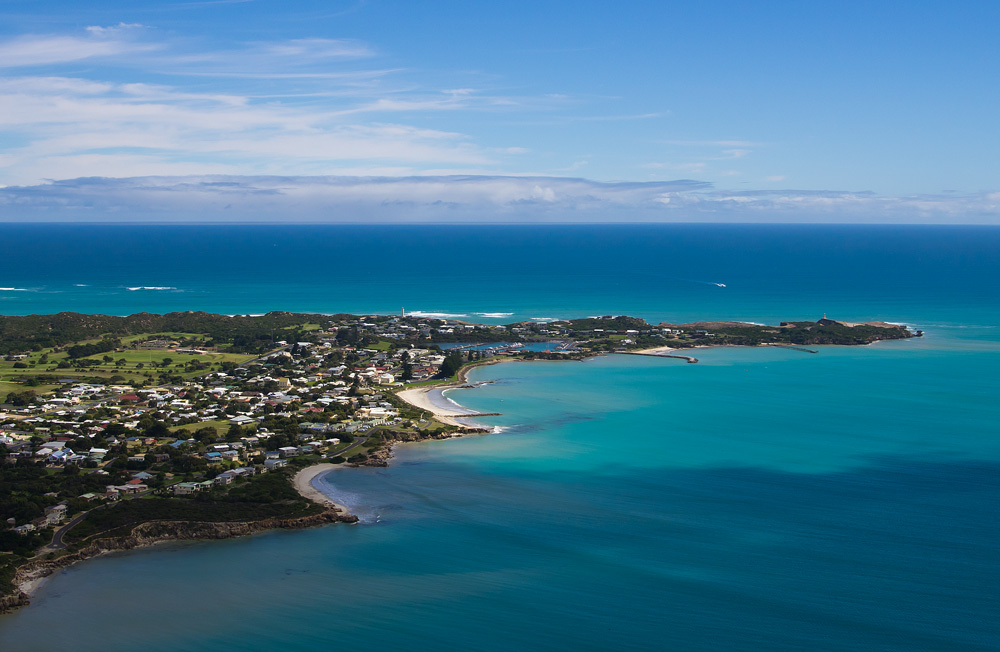
- Cape Dombey, Robe

- Coordinates: 37.17°S 139.84°E
- Country: Australia
- State: South Australia
- Region: South East
- LGA(s): District Council of Robe
- Established: 18 April 1846

Area
  - Total: 360 km^{2} (139 sq mi)
- County: Robe
Lands administrative divisions around Waterhouse
Southern Ocean	Mount Benson	Bowaka
Southern Ocean	Waterhouse	Ross; Bray
Southern Ocean	Lake George	Lake George

The Hundred of Waterhouse is a cadastral hundred of the County of Robe, South Australia, established in 1846.

The hundred is located on the south-east coast near Lake Hawdon and the port of Robe.
