= Avenue railway station =

Former railway station in South Australia, Australia

Avenue

General information
- Location: Avenue Range Road, Avenue Range, South Australia
- Coordinates: 36.94249131700346°S 140.22788933461703°E
- Operator: Australian National
- Line: Kingston SE line
- Distance: 331 kilometres from Adelaide
- Platforms: 1
- Tracks: 1

Construction
- Structure type: Ground

Other information
- Status: Closed and demolished

History
- Closed: 28 November 1987

Services
Preceding station	Australian National Railways Commission	Following station
Lucindale towards Naracoorte	Kingston-Naracoorte railway line	Reedy Creek towards Kingston SE
Location

Avenue railway station was located on the Kingston SE railway line. It served the locality of Avenue Range, South Australia.

== History ==
An isolated line was authorised by the South-Eastern Railway Act in 1871 and completed in 1876 from the port at Kingston SE inland via Lucindale to Naracoorte as narrow gauge. For the first six months after the line was completed, no locomotives were available, so wagons on the line were towed by horses. It was converted to broad gauge with a new terminus one kilometre east of Kingston, on the edge of the port township in 1957 although it is unclear when Avenue station was opened.

In 1941, the station was burnt down by a fire.

The line through Avenue was closed on 28 November 1987 and was removed on 15 September 1991; The station shelter remains at the site in a dismantled condition.
