= County of Robe =

Robe
- Cadastral division
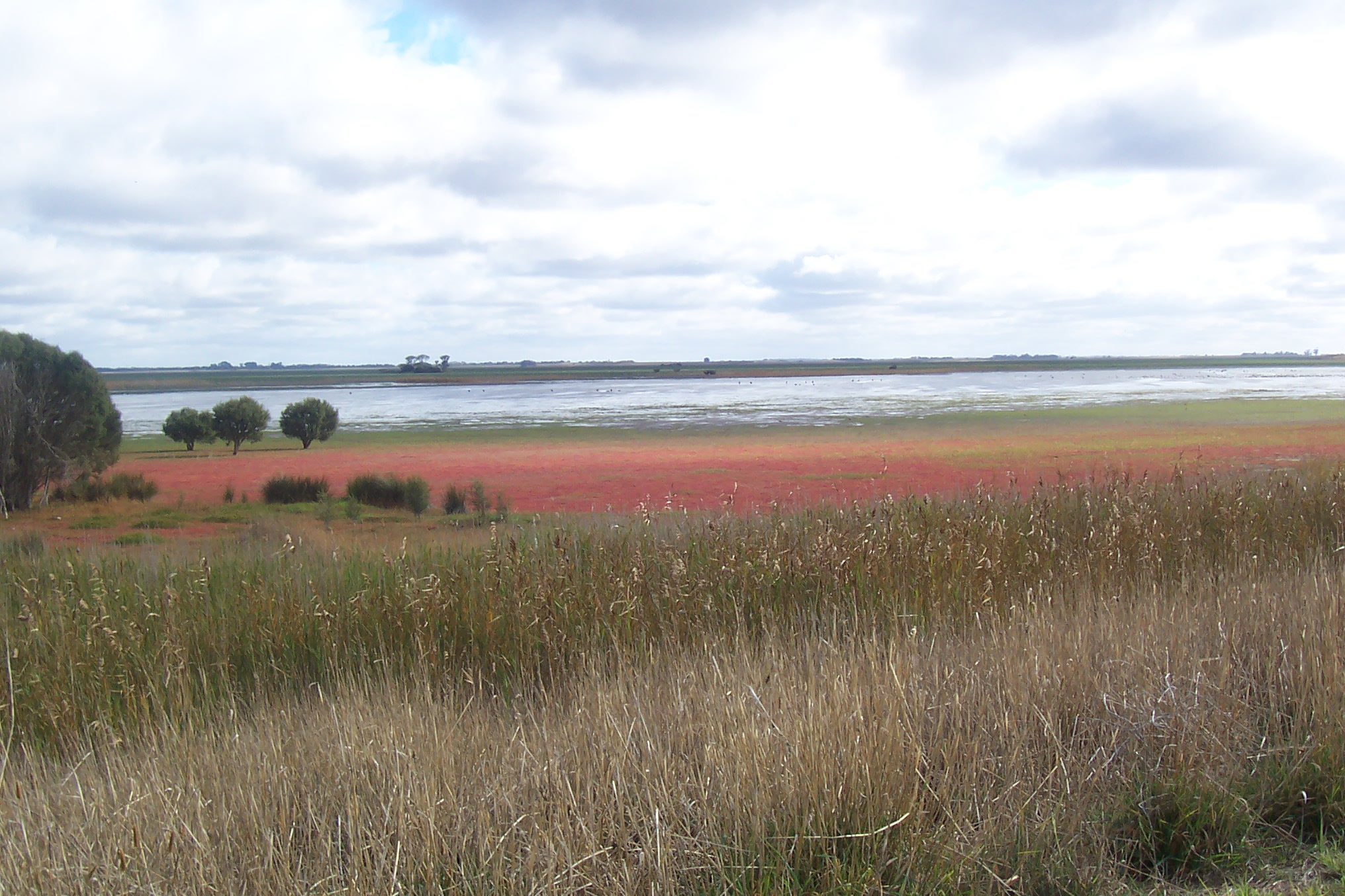
- Samphire on the edges of Bool Lagoon in the Hundred of Robertson

- Coordinates: 37°06′50″S 140°23′46″E
- Country: Australia
- State: South Australia
- LGA(s): Naracoorte Lucindale Council; District Council of Robe; Kingston District Council; Wattle Range Council
- Established: 23 July 1846

Area
  - Total: 5,080 km^{2} (1,962 sq mi)
Lands administrative divisions around Robe
Ocean	MacDonnell	Lowan (Vic)
Ocean	Robe	Lowan (Vic); Follett (Vic)
Ocean	Grey	Follett (Vic)

The County of Robe is one of the 49 cadastral counties of South Australia. It was proclaimed by and named for Governor Frederick Robe in 1846. It covers a portion of the state's south-east from the west coast at Robe to the border with Victoria on the east. This includes the following contemporary local government areas of the state:

- District Council of Robe
- Naracoorte Lucindale Council (excluding north third)
- Kingston District Council (small south portion)
- Wattle Range Council (small north portion)

== Hundreds ==
The County of Robe is divided into the following 18 hundreds:

- Hundred of Mount Benson (Wangolina)
- Hundred of Bowaka (Reedy Creek)
- Hundred of Townsend (Avenue Range)
- Hundred of Joyce (Lucindale)
- Hundred of Spence (Spence)
- Hundred of Naracoorte (Naracoorte)
- Hundred of Jessie (Hynam)
- Hundred of Waterhouse (Robe)
- Hundred of Ross (Mount Benson)
- Hundred of Conmurra (Conmurra)
- Hundred of Robertson (Bool Lagoon)
- Hundred of Joanna (Joanna)
- Hundred of Bray (Bray)
- Hundred of Smith (Greenways)
- Hundred of Fox (Fox)
- Hundred of Coles (Coles)
- Hundred of Killanoola (Maaoupe)
- Hundred of Comaum (Coonawarra, Comaum)
