= Hundred of Bray (South Australia) =

Hundred of South Australia

- Cadastral division
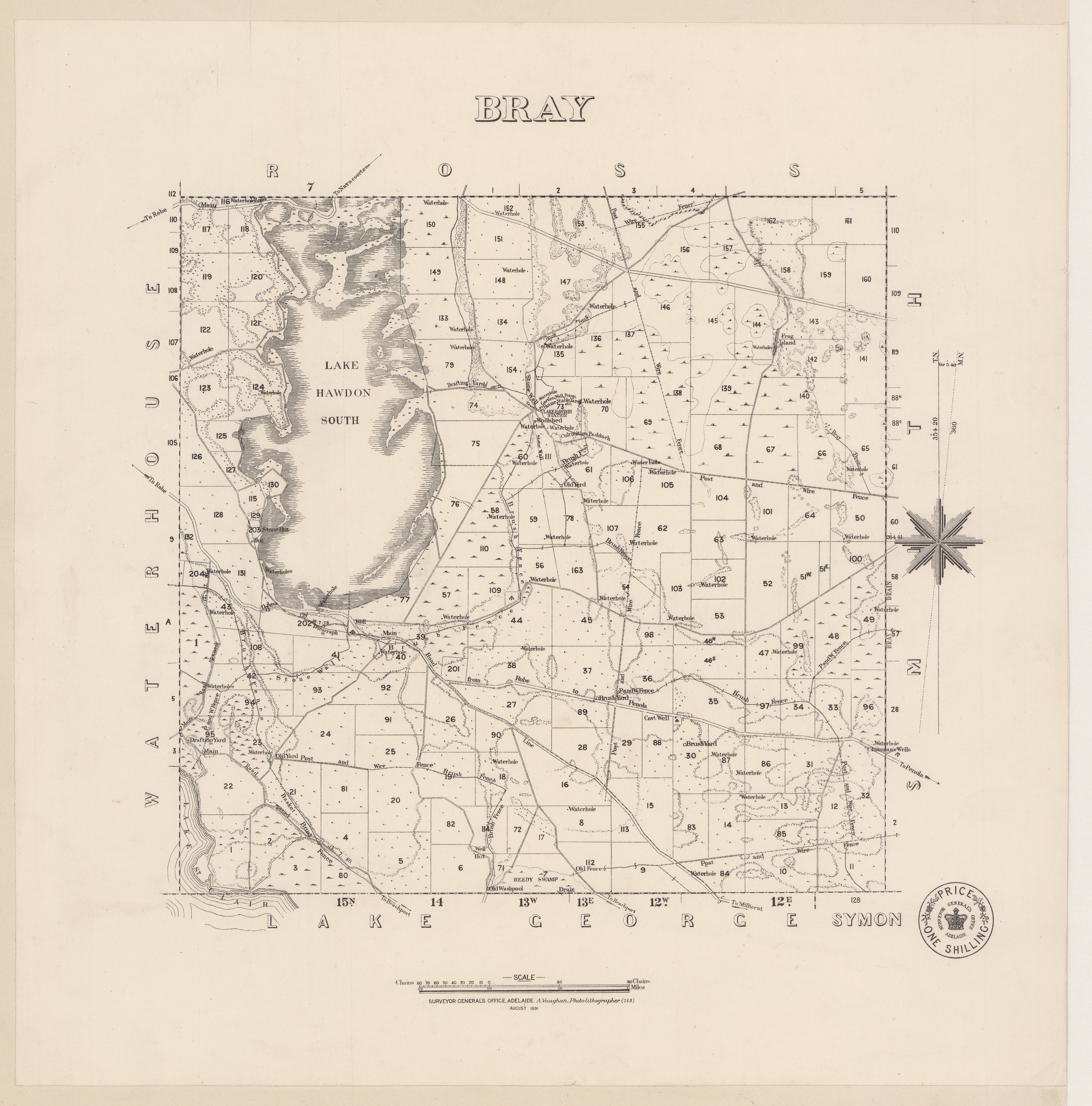
- Hundred of Bray, 1891

- Interactive map of Hundred of Bray
- Coordinates: 37.246°S 139.995°E
- Country: Australia
- State: South Australia
- County: Robe
Lands administrative divisions around Hundred of Bray
	Hundred of Ross	Hundred of Conmurra
Hundred of Waterhouse	Hundred of Bray	Hundred of Smith
	Hundred of Lake George	Hundred of Symon

The Hundred of Bray, is a hundred in the County of Robe within the Limestone Coast region of South Australia. Its extent is roughly the same as the locality of Bray, South Australia.

The main geographic feature of the hundred is Lake Hawden.
