= Bool Lagoon, South Australia =

Bool Lagoon South Australia
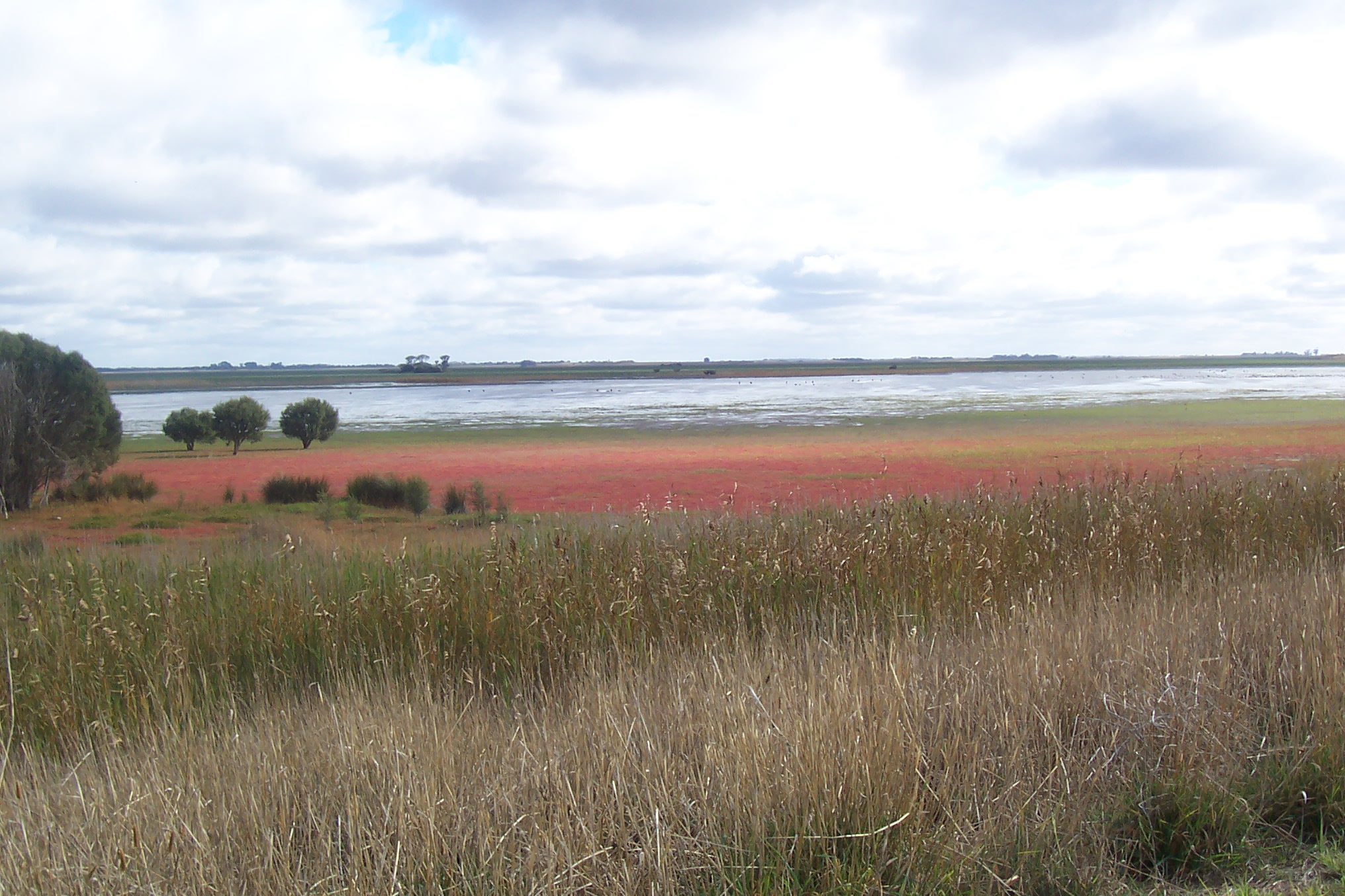
- The locality’s name is derived from Bool Lagoon.

- Coordinates: 37.139210°S 140.7218°E
- Population: 42 (SAL 2016)
- Established: 12 April 2001
- Postcode(s): 5271
- Time zone: ACST (UTC+9:30)
  - Summer (DST): ACST (UTC+10:30)
- Location: 311 km (193 mi) south-east of Adelaide; 20 km (12 mi) south of Naracoorte; 60 km (37 mi) north-east of Millicent
- LGA(s): Naracoorte Lucindale Council; Wattle Range Council
- State electorate(s): MacKillop
- Federal division(s): Barker
Mean max temp	Mean min temp	Annual rainfall
20.7 °C; 69 °F	8.0 °C; 46 °F	548.5 mm 21.6 in
Suburbs around Bool Lagoon:
Spence	Moyhall	Struan
Spence	Bool Lagoon	Struan; Glenroy
Coles	Maaoupe	Glenroy
- Footnotes: Locations; Local government areas Adjoining localities

Bool Lagoon is a locality in the Australian state of South Australia located in the south-east of the state in the Limestone Coast region about 311 kilometres (193 miles) south east of the state capital of Adelaide.

Its boundaries were created in 2001 firstly for the part in the former District Council of Millicent in April of that year followed in December by the part in the former District Council of Penola. Its name is derived from Bool Lagoon, a freshwater lagoon located within its boundaries.

Land use within the locality is divided between agriculture and conservation with the latter being represented by the following protected areas all located in the northern part of the locality - the Bool Lagoon Game Reserve, the Hacks Lagoon Conservation Park and the Mary Seymour Conservation Park.

The locality includes the following state heritage place - Farm Group Killanoola.

Bool Lagoon is located within the federal Division of Barker, the state electoral district of MacKillop, and the local government areas of the Naracoorte Lucindale Council and the Wattle Range Council.
