= Bool Lagoon Game Reserve =

Game reserve in South Australia

- IUCN category VI (protected area with sustainable use of natural resources)
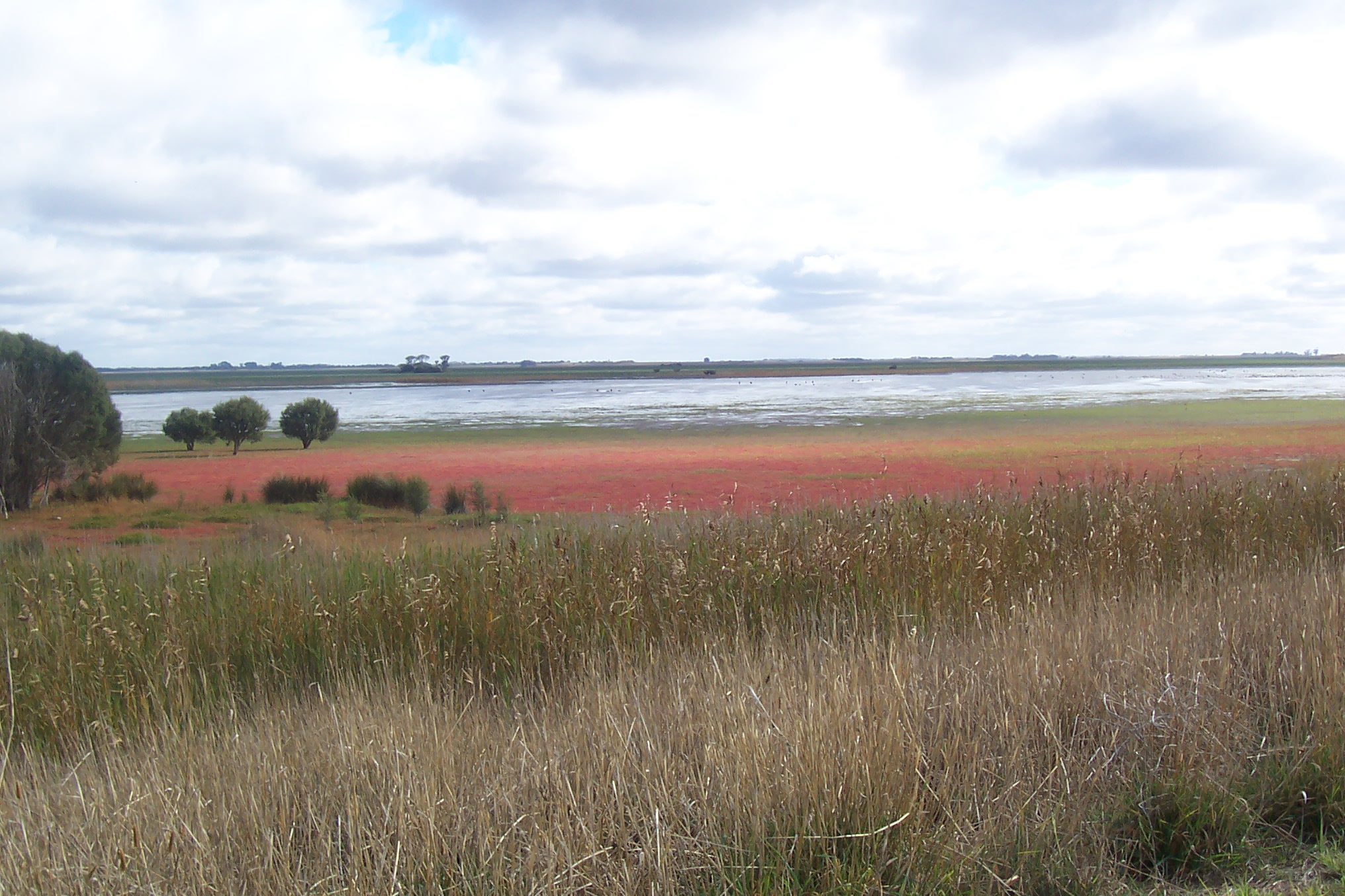
- Bool Lagoon. The red plant is samphire.

- Location within South Australia
- Location: South Australia
- Nearest city: Naracoorte
- Coordinates: 37°07′S 140°41′E
- Area: 31.03 km^{2} (11.98 sq mi)
- Established: 8 June 1967
- Governing body: Department for Environment and Water
- Website: http://www.environment.sa.gov.au/parks/Find_a_Park/Browse_by_region/Limestone_Coast

Bool Lagoon Game Reserve is a protected area located in the Limestone Coast region of South Australia, about 24 kilometres (15 miles) south of the town of Naracoorte.

== History ==
The game reserve began as land in sections 223 and 224 of the cadastral unit of the Hundred of Robertson which acquired protected area status on 8 June 1967 simultaneously as a game reserve declared under the Fauna Conservation Act, 1964-1965 and as a Fauna Conservation Reserve under the Crown Lands Act, 1929-1967 in association with land in section 249. On 17 February 1972, section 356 was added to the game reserve. On 27 April 1972, land in sections 223 and 224 and 356 was reconstituted as the Bool Lagoon Game Reserve under the National Parks and Wildlife Act 1972.

In 1980, it was listed on the now-defunct Register of the National Estate.

In 1985, the area covered by both the game reserve and the Hacks Lagoon Conservation Park was added under the name "Bool and Hacks Lagoons" to the List of Wetlands of International Importance maintained by the Ramsar Convention.

== Ecology ==
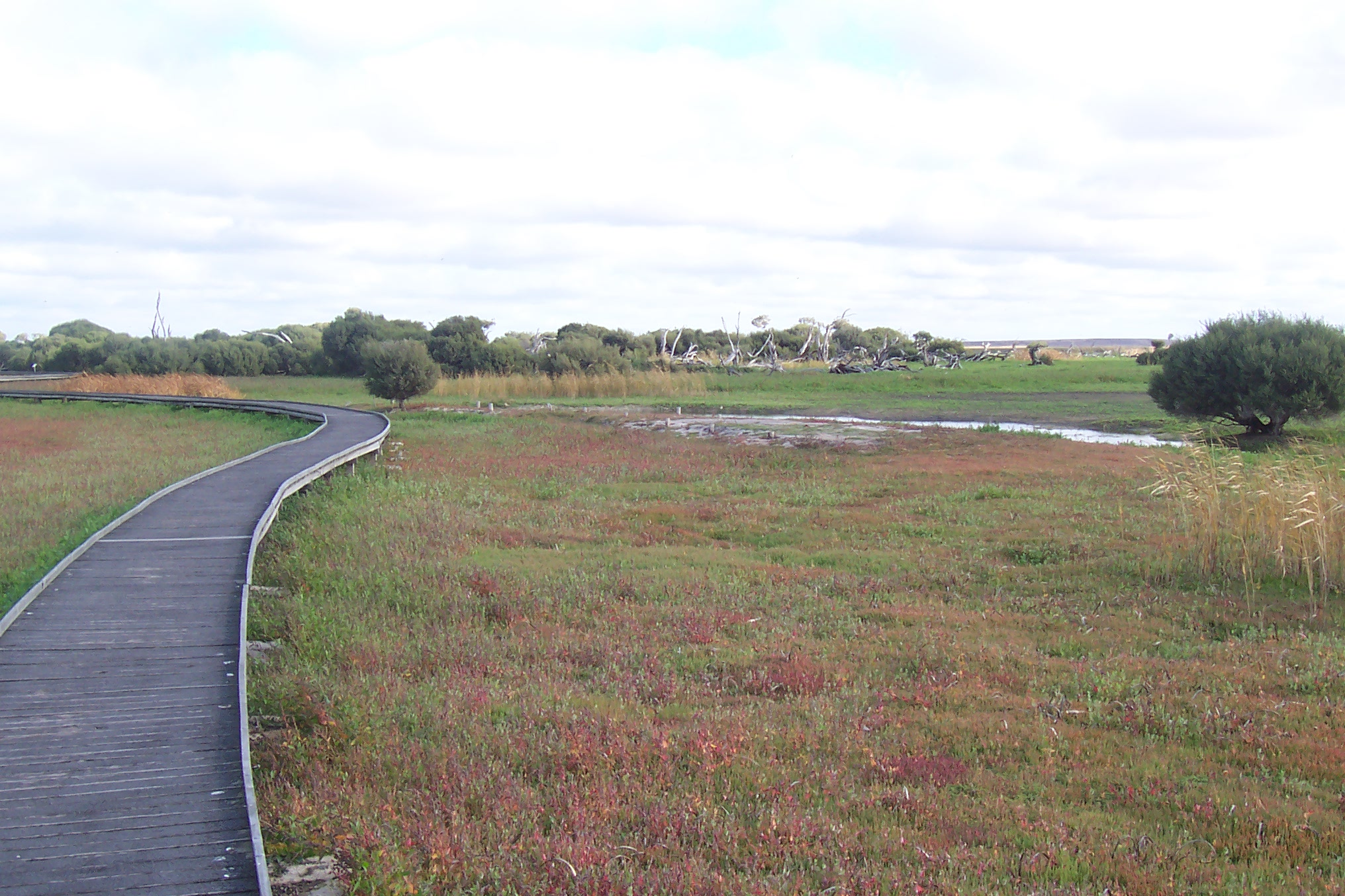
Bool Lagoon provides boardwalks and bird hides.

While Bool Lagoon is officially a game reserve, in dry years it attracts many waterbirds of many species, and is frequently a point of contention between duck hunters and animal rights activists. The adjacent Hacks Lagoon Conservation Park also provides refuge for waterbirds. There are a number of boardwalks and bird hides at both lagoons to facilitate birdwatching. The lagoons are visited by up to 150 species of birds, many having migrated from the Northern Hemisphere. The reserve is classified as an IUCN Category VI protected area.

Another ecological issue is that in the past, hunters used much lead shot. In recent times, even when the lagoon is opened for hunting, only steel shot may be used.

== Hydrology ==
Mosquito Creek flows into Hacks Lagoon, and any overflow flows into Bool Lagoon. Mosquito Creek used to continue out of Hacks Lagoon to spread out on the plains near Naracoorte, but is now blocked and any excess water is directed through a drain from Bool Lagoon to the coast near Beachport.

== See also ==
- Bool (disambiguation)
- Duck hunting in South Australia
