= Kingston SE railway line =

Former railway line in South Australia

Overview
- Status: Closed and removed
- Locale: Limestone Coast, South Australia
- Termini: Naracoorte; Kingston SE
- Continues from: Mount Gambier–Wolseley line
- Stations: Naracoorte, Stewarts, Lucindale, Bull Islands, Reedy Creek, Avenue Range (Avenue), Kingston SE

Service
- System: South Australian Railways
- Operator(s): South Australian Railways (1876–1978), Australian National (1978–1987)

History
- Opened: June 1876
- Closed: 28 November 1987

Technical
- Line length: 94.95 km (59.00 mi)
- Track gauge: 1600 mm (5 ft 3 in) from 1957
- Old gauge: 1067 mm (3 ft 6 in) (1876–1957)

The Kingston SE railway line was a railway line on the South Australian Railways network.

== History ==
An isolated line was authorised by the South-Eastern Railway Act in 1871 and completed in June 1876 from the port at Kingston SE (Note: "SE", meaning "South East" of South Australia, was added to the town's name to distinguish it from Kingston on Murray.) inland via Lucindale to Naracoorte as narrow gauge. For the first six months after the line was completed, no locomotives were available, so wagons on the line were towed by horses.

On the night of 26 February 1941, a fire broke out at the Avenue Range (Avenue) station grounds, completely destroying the station office and its contents. The immediate cause of the fire was not evident, and an official inquest into the incident, on 7 March 1941, could not determine it either. The railway administration subsequently replaced the building with a basic corrugated iron waiting shed.

The line was converted to broad gauge with a new terminus 1 kilometre (0.6 miles) east of Kingston, on the edge of the port township in 1957. Freight and passenger services ceased on 28 November 1987.

The last train on the line (which was temporarily reopened for the event) was Bluebird railcar 255 Pelican, organised by the Rail Tourist Association on 9 December 1987. The line was dismantled in September 1991.

== Stations ==
Station / Siding	Opened	Closed	Current Status	Notes
Naracoorte	1876	12 April 1995	Closed	Junction with the Wolseley–Mount Gambier line.
Stewart Range	1876	-	Demolished	-
Lucindale	1876	28 November 1987	Preserved	Station building survived; repurposed as a local museum.
Avenue	1876	28 November 1987	Demolished	Original weatherboard building destroyed in fire
Reedy Creek	1876	-	Demolished	-
Kingston SE	1876	28 November 1987	Demolished	Relocated 1 km inland during the 1957 broad-gauge conversion.
