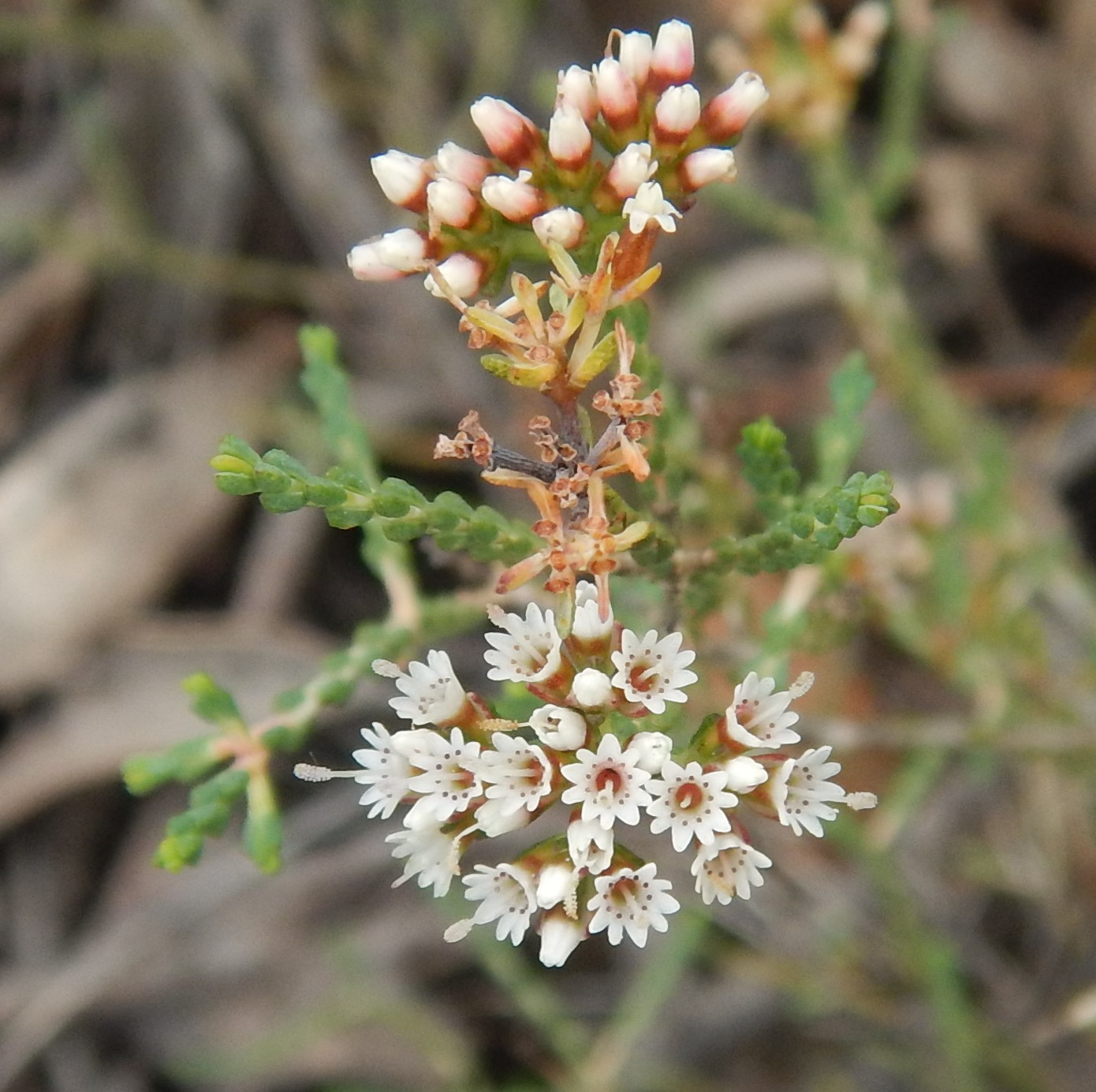
- Near Petherick, South Australia

Scientific classification
- Kingdom: Plantae
- Clade: Tracheophytes
- Clade: Angiosperms
- Clade: Eudicots
- Clade: Rosids
- Order: Myrtales
- Family: Myrtaceae
- Genus: Darwinia
- Species: D. micropetala

Binomial name
- Darwinia micropetala (F.Muell.) Benth.
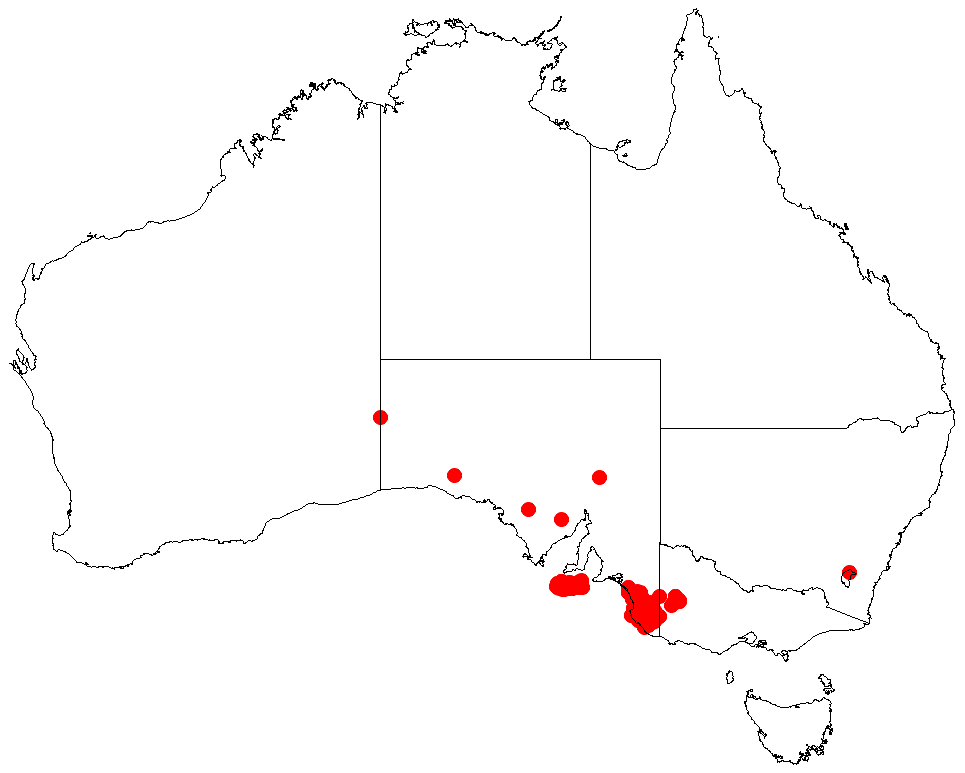
- Occurrence data from AVH

Synonyms
- Chamaelaucium micropetalum F.Muell. orth. var.; Chamelaucium micropetalum (F.Muell.) F.Muell.; Genethyllis micropetala F.Muell. orth. var.; Genetyllis micropetala F.Muell.

= Darwinia micropetala =

Species of plant

Darwinia micropetala, commonly known as small darwinia, is a species of flowering plant in the family Myrtaceae and is endemic to south-eastern continental Australia. It is a small, erect shrub with linear leaves, and heads of white to pink flowers.

== Description ==
Darwinia micropetala is an erect, wiry shrub that typically grows to a height of 30–50 cm (12–20 in). Its leaves are arranged in opposite pairs, linear, 2–3 mm (0.079–0.118 in) long, about 0.5 mm (0.020 in) wide and triangular to egg-shaped in cross-section. The flowers are borne in upper leaf axils in compound, corymbose heads with two to four flowers in each partial head. The bracteoles are white to pink and egg-shaped with the narrower end towards the base, and often fall off as the flowers open. The floral tube is 2–3 mm (0.079–0.118 in) long and about 1 mm (0.039 in) wide, the sepals and petals white to pink, egg-shaped and about 1 mm (0.039 in) long.

== Taxonomy ==
Darwinia micropetala was first formally described in 1858 by Victorian Government Botanist Ferdinand von Mueller who named it Genetyllis micropetala in Fragmenta Phytographiae Australiae from specimens collected by "Bannier" on Kangaroo Island. In 1865, George Bentham changed the name to Darwinia micropetala.

== Distribution and habitat ==
Small darwinia grows in swales and near salt lakes in south-eastern South Australia and in the Little Desert area of western Victoria.
