= Hundred of Killanoola =

Hundred of South Australia

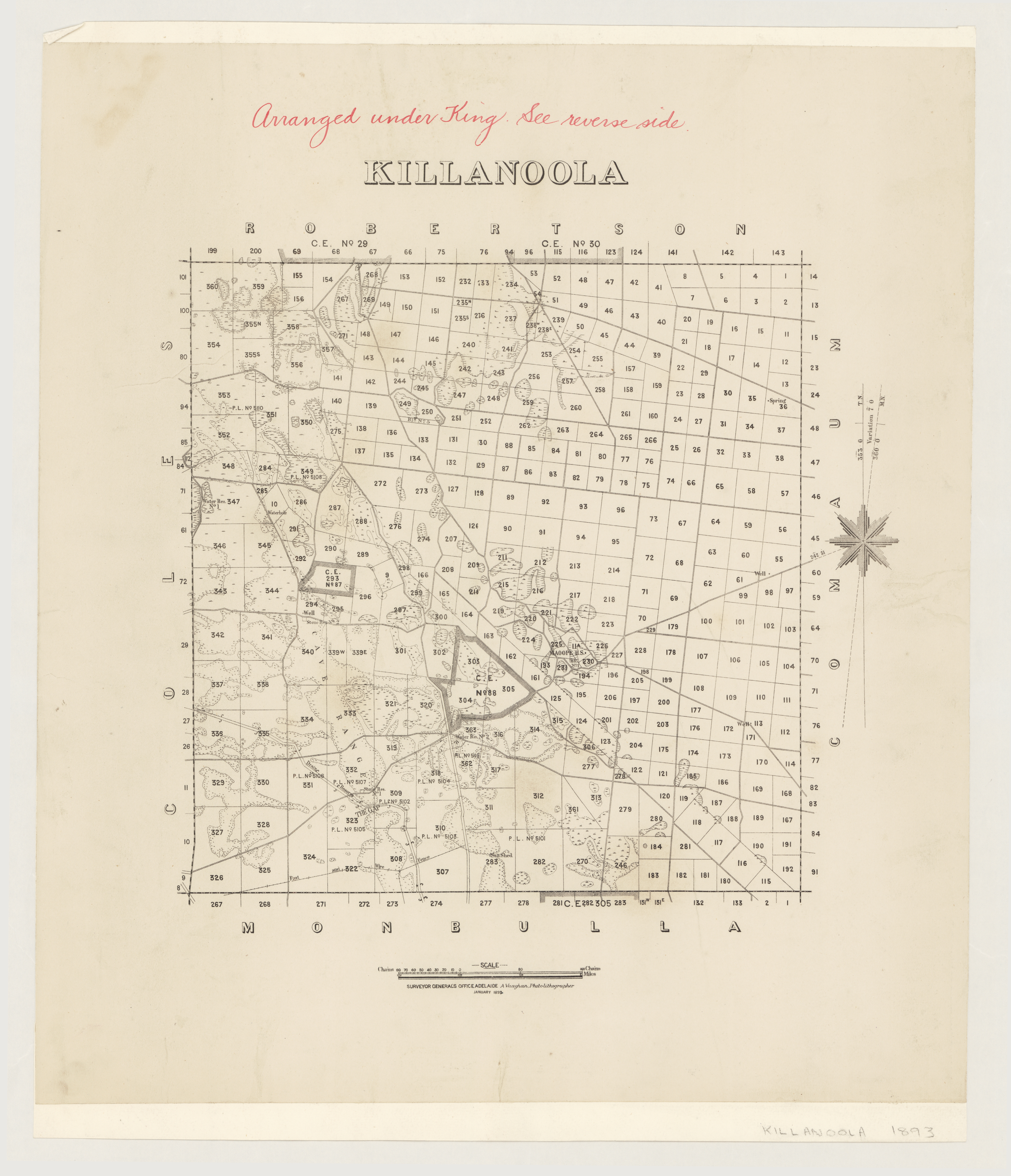
Hundred of Killanoola, 1893

The Hundred of Killanoola is a hundred in the County of Robe in the Limestone Coast region of South Australia.

The hundred is part of the Coonawarra wine-growing area.
