= Coles, South Australia =

Coles South Australia
- Coordinates: 37°12′45″S 140°27′39″E
- Population: 35 (SAL 2021)
- Established: 3 December 1998
- Postcode(s): 5272
- Time zone: ACST (UTC+9:30)
  - Summer (DST): ACST (UTC+10:30)
- Location: 316 km (196 mi) SE of Adelaide; 39 km (24 mi) SW of Naracoorte
- LGA(s): Naracoorte Lucindale Council
- Region: Limestone Coast
- County: Robe
- State electorate(s): MacKillop
- Federal division(s): Barker
Mean max temp	Mean min temp	Annual rainfall
21.2 °C; 70 °F	8.4 °C; 47 °F	603.5 mm 23.8 in
Suburbs around Coles:
Lucindale	Lucindale; Spence	Spence
Fox	Coles	Spence; Bool Lagoon; Maaoupe
Furner	Short	Wattle Range East
- Footnotes: Locations; Adjoining localities

Coles is a locality in the Australian state of South Australia located in the state's south-east within the Limestone Coast region about 316 kilometres (196 mi) south east of the state capital of Adelaide and about 39 kilometres (24 mi) south-west of the municipal seat of Naracoorte.

Boundaries for the locality were created and was given the name of Coles on 3 December 1998. The name is derived from the cadastral unit of the Hundred of Coles in which the locality is located. The hundred itself was named after Jenkin Coles who was a member of the South Australian House of Assembly from 1875 to 1911.

Coles is located within the federal division of Barker, the state electoral district of MacKillop and the local government area of the Naracoorte Lucindale Council.

In January 2022 a bushfire burning within the locality resulted in the death of a CFS volunteer Louise Hincks.
