= Hundred of Smith =

Hundred of South Australia

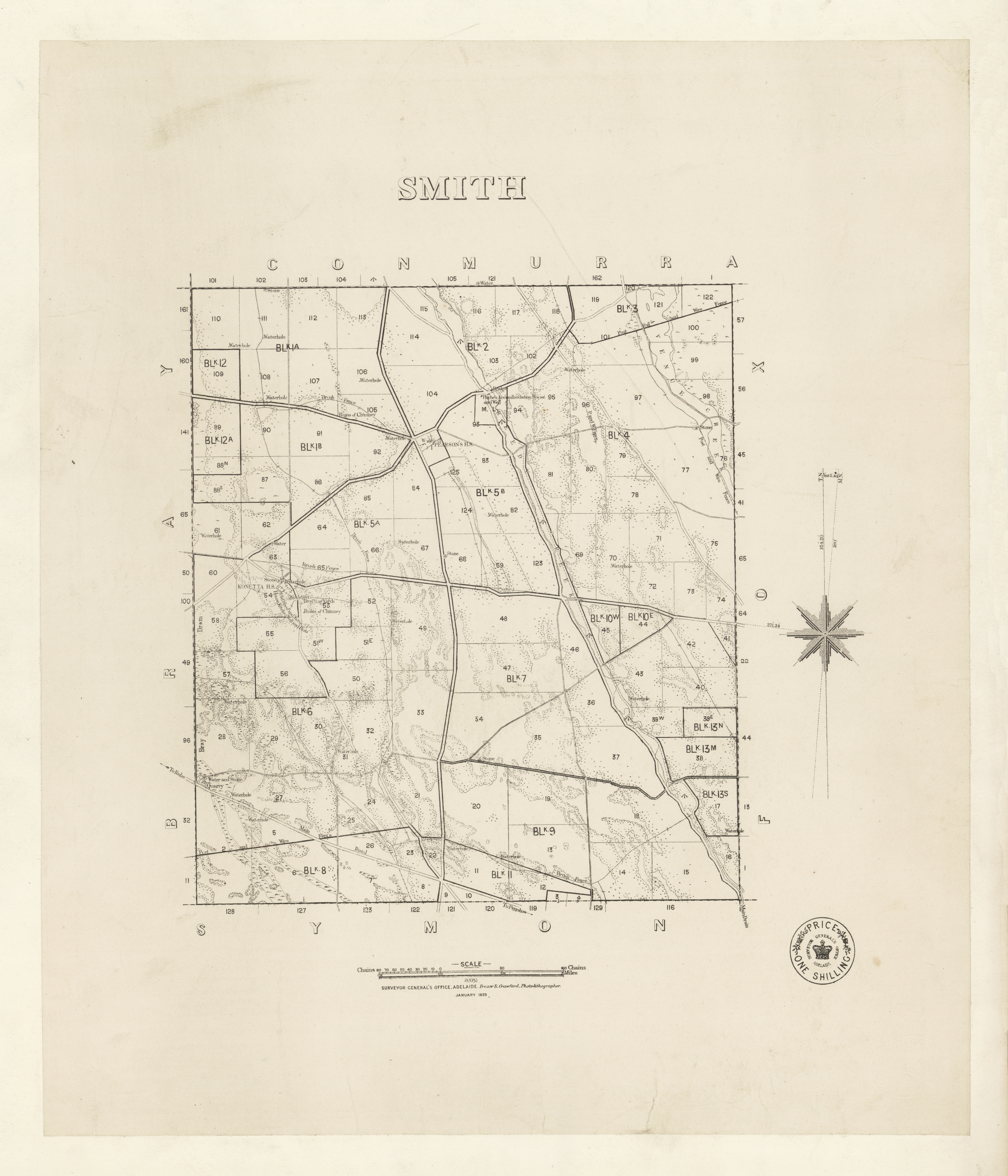
Hundred of Smith, 1889

The Hundred of Smith is a hundred in the County of Robe, in the Limestone Coast region of South Australia.
