= Hundred of Mount Benson =

Hundred of South Australia

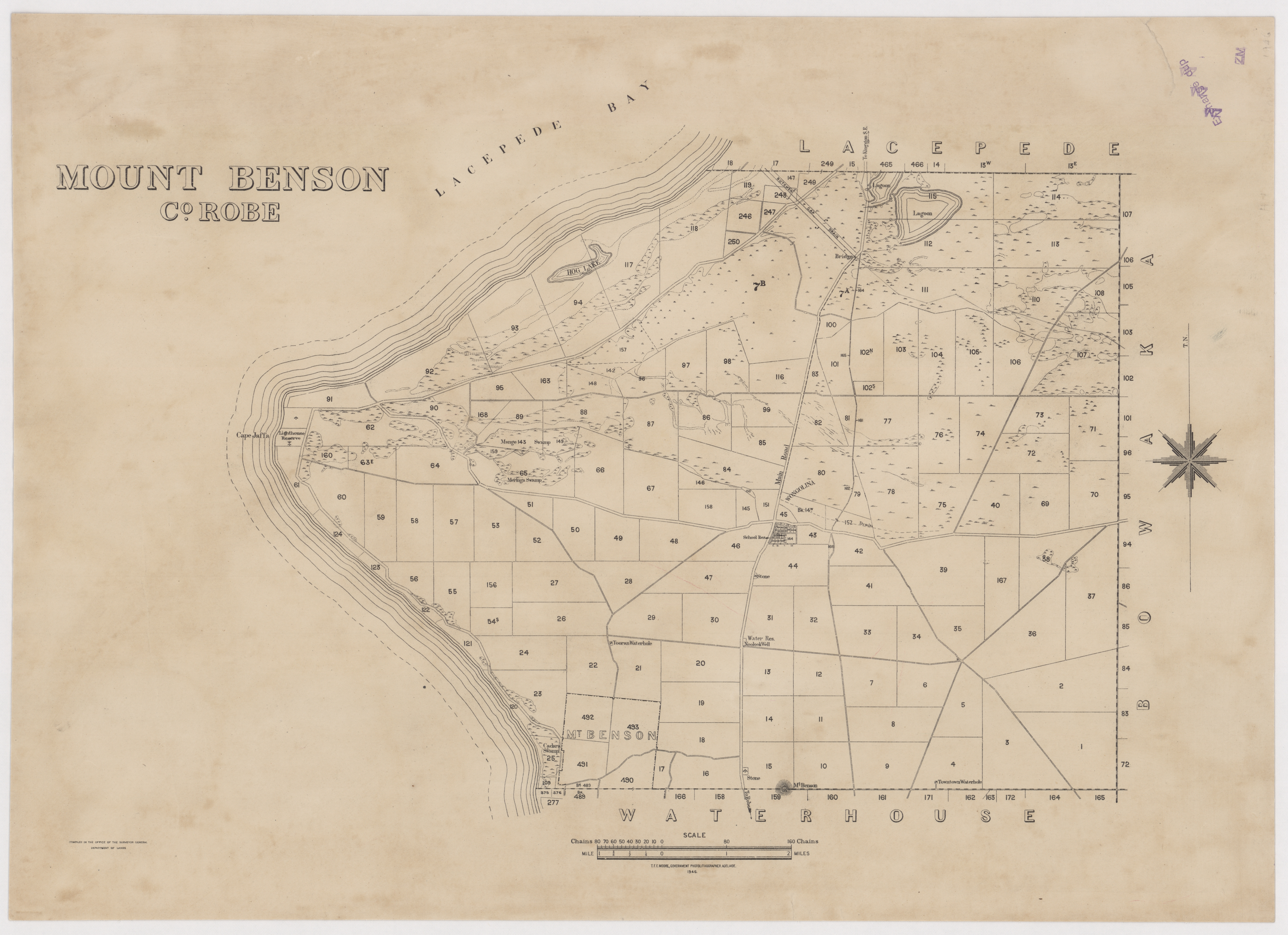
Hundred of Mount Benson, 1946

The Hundred of Mount Benson, is a hundred in the County of Robe, within the Limestone Coast region of South Australia.

The Hundred is located at 36.942°S 139.818°E, about 252 km (157 mi) south-east of Adelaide city centre. The main economic activity is agriculture with the hundred being within the Mount Benson wine region. A small portion of the Coastal fringe is set aside for conservation.

The main geographic feature of the hundred is Cape Jaffa promontory jutting into Lacepede Bay. The Southern Ports Highway passes through the Hundred.

== History ==
The traditional owners of the hundred are the Ngarrindjerri and Bindjali peoples. The first Europeans to the area were Peron in 1903 and Freycinet of the Baudin expedition of 1800–03.

== See also ==
- Wangolina, South Australia
