= Spence, South Australia =

Spence South Australia
- Coordinates: 37°3′48″S 140°33′59″E
- Population: 51 (2016 census)
- Established: 3 December 1998
- Postcode(s): 5271
- LGA(s): Naracoorte Lucindale Council
- State electorate(s): MacKillop
- Federal division(s): Barker
Localities around Spence:
Lucindale	Stewart Range	Stewart Range
Lucindale	Spence	Moyhall; Bool Lagoon
Coles	Coles	Bool Lagoon
- Footnotes: Adjoining localities

Spence is a locality located within the Naracoorte Lucindale Council in the Limestone Coast region of South Australia. It comprises approximately the southern half of the Hundred of Spence.
