= Hundred of Bowaka =

Hundred of South Australia

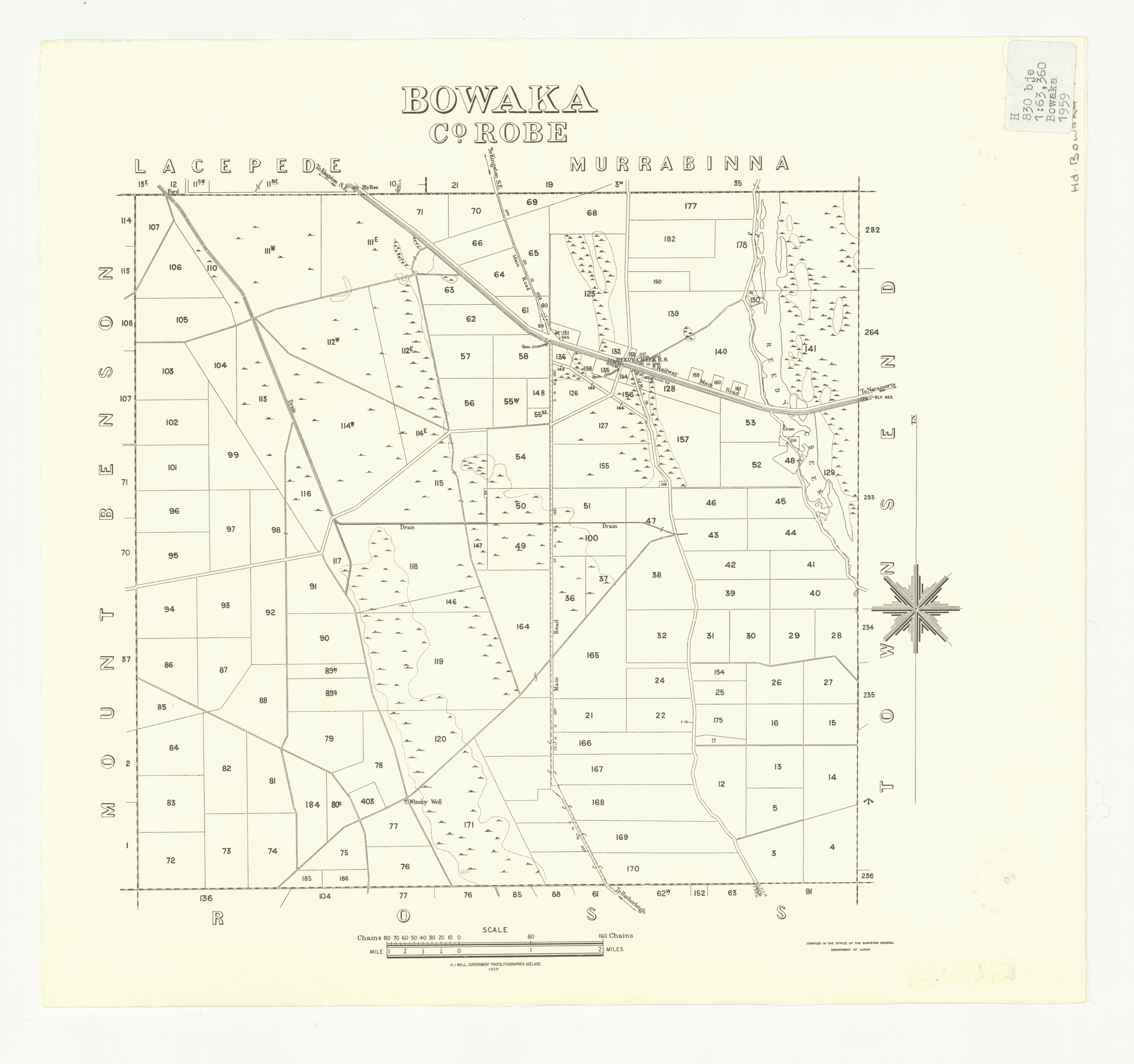
Hundred of Bowaka, 1959

The Hundred of Bowaka, is a hundred in the County of Robe, within the Limestone Coast region of South Australia. The hundred is located at 36°55′38″S 140°1′33″E.

== See also ==
- Reedy Creek, South Australia
