= Hundred of Robertson =

Hundred of South Australia

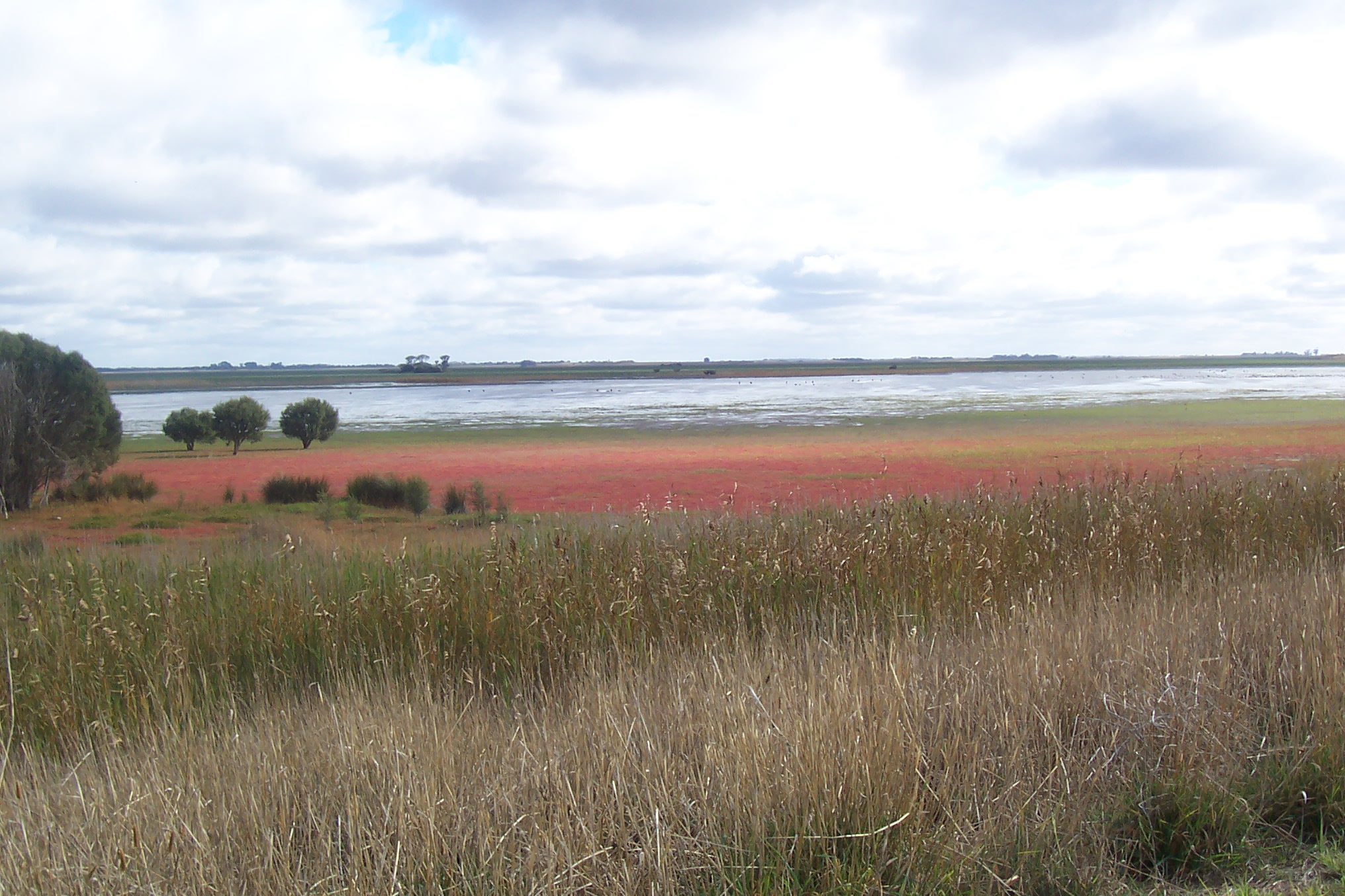
countryside in Hundred of Robertson

The Hundred of Robertson is a Hundred of the County of Robe in South Australia. The hundred is located on the Limestone Coast region, south east of the state capital of Adelaide. The Hundred is located inland from the coast.
