= Hundred of Ross =

Hundred of South Australia

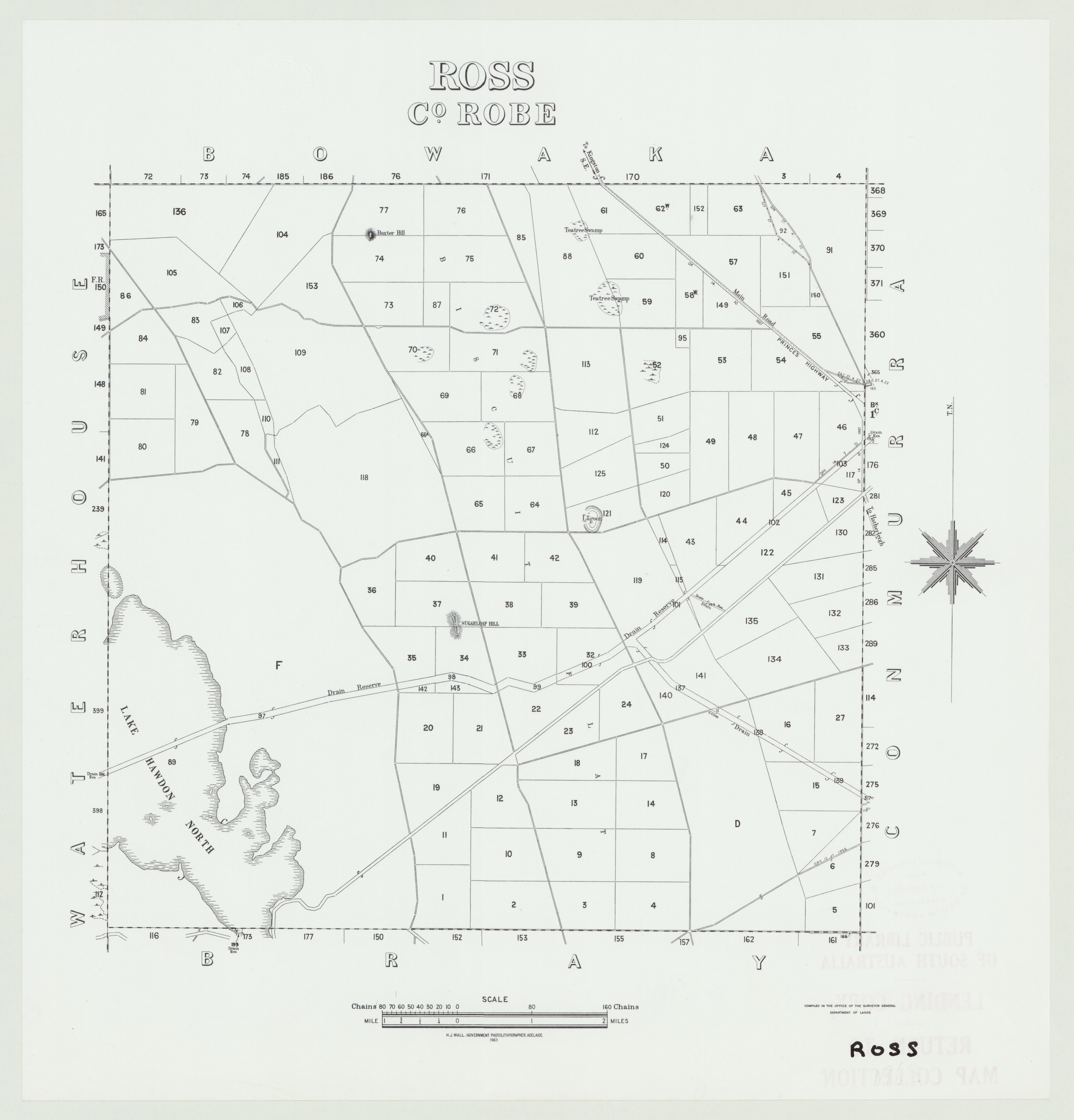
Hundred of Ross, 1963

The Hundred of Ross, is a hundred in the County of Robe in the Limestone Coast region of South Australia.
