= Lucindale, South Australia =

Lucindale
- Town
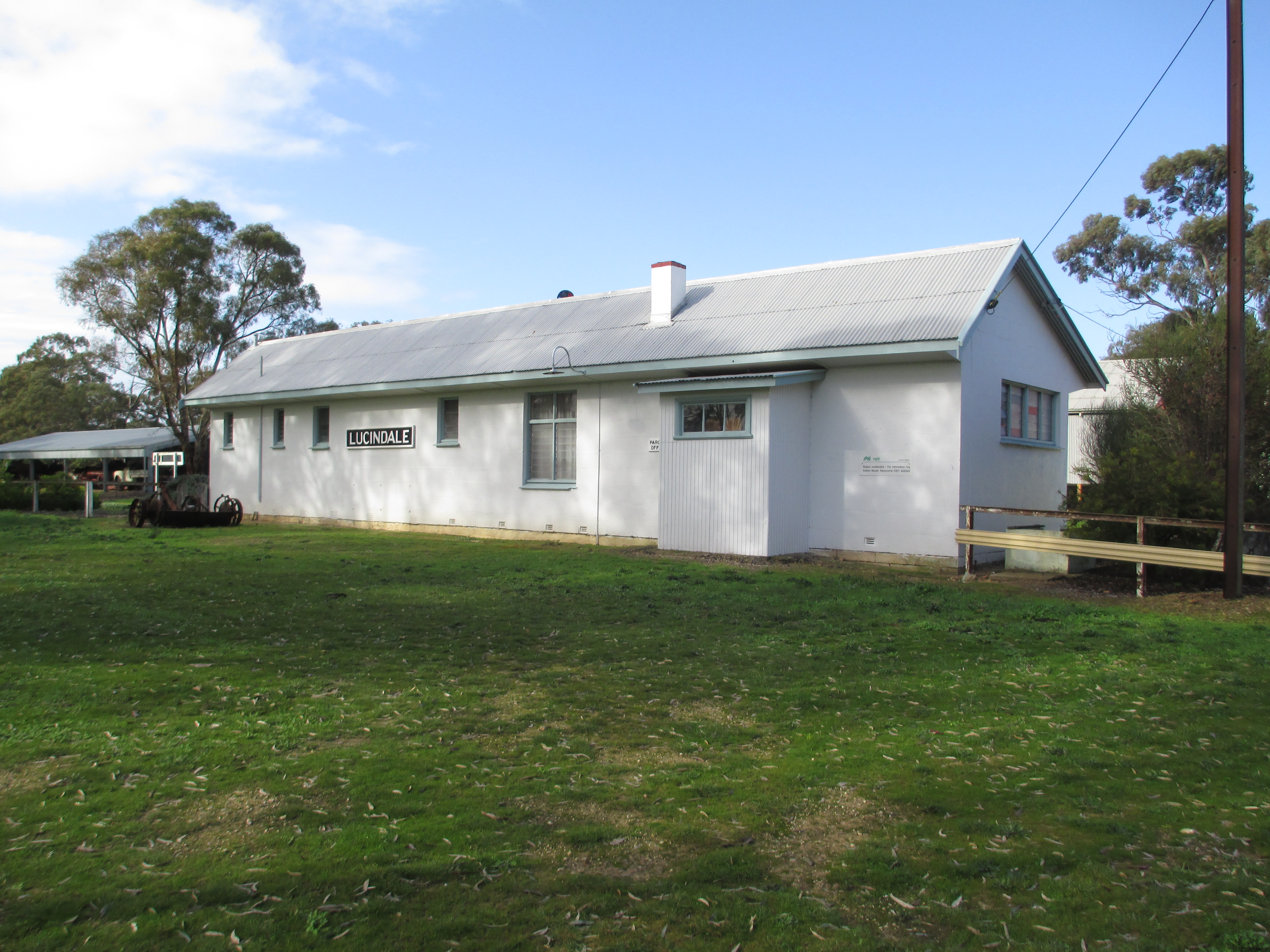
- Former railway building at the Lucindale museum

- Coordinates: 36°59′0″S 140°22′0″E
- Country: Australia
- State: South Australia
- Region: Limestone Coast
- LGA: Naracoorte Lucindale Council
- Location: 345 km (214 mi) SE of Adelaide; 127 km (79 mi) NW of Mount Gambier; 41 km (25 mi) W of Naracoorte
- Established: 25 January 1877 (town); 3 December 1998 (locality)

Government
  - State electorate: MacKillop
  - Federal division: Barker
- Elevation: 30 m (98 ft)

Population
  - Totals: 288 (urban centre) (2021 census); 637 (state suburb) (2021 census)
- Time zone: UTC+9:30 (ACST)
  - Summer (DST): UTC+10:30 (ACST)
- Postcode: 5272
- County: Robe
- Mean max temp: 21.2 °C (70.2 °F)
- Mean min temp: 8.4 °C (47.1 °F)
- Annual rainfall: 601.6 mm (23.69 in)
Localities around Lucindale
Avenue Range	Woolumbool	Lochaber
Avenue Range; Conmurra	Lucindale	Stewart Range; Spence
Conmurra	Coles; Fox	Spence

Lucindale is a small town in the south-east of South Australia. The town is located 345 kilometres (214 mi) south east of the state capital, Adelaide. At the 2021 census, Lucindale had a population of 288. The town is best known for hosting the annual South East Field Days, attracting over 26,000 visitors every March.

== History ==
The town was proclaimed on 25 January 1877. It was named after Lady Jeannie Lucinda Musgrave—the wife of the Governor of South Australia, Anthony Musgrave. It was a station on the Kingston-Naracoorte railway line which opened around the same time and closed on 28 November 1987 then dismantled on 15 September 1991. A school was established in 1878. The Post Office opened on 1 May 1877 but was known as Baker's Range for a few months.

The locality of Lucindale was proclaimed on 3 December 1998.

== Today ==
Lucindale is home to a health centre, licensed post office and newsagent and a service station. Education from reception to Year 12 is provided by the Lucindale Area School.

Lucindale was named Australia's tidiest town by the Keep Australia Beautiful Council in 1994 and was a finalist in 2006.

The town hosted the triple j One Night Stand on 14 September 2019. More than 15,000 people attended.

The town has an Australian Rules football team competing in the Kowree-Naracoorte-Tatiara Football League.

In January 2021, a significant bushfire destroyed over 14,000 hectares of land surrounding the town of Lucindale. At least 4 homes were destroyed in the blaze.

== Notable people from Lucindale ==
- Sandy Roberts – television personality and sports presenter.
- Andrew McKay (born 1970) – former player of Carlton Football Club
- Darcy Fogarty (born 1999) – Adelaide Football Club since 2018

== Climate ==
Climate data for Lucindale
Month	Jan	Feb	Mar	Apr	May	Jun	Jul	Aug	Sep	Oct	Nov	Dec	Year
Record high °C (°F)	44.1 (111.4)	44.0 (111.2)	42.0 (107.6)	35.0 (95.0)	28.8 (83.8)	21.2 (70.2)	22.2 (72.0)	25.6 (78.1)	29.8 (85.6)	35.4 (95.7)	42.0 (107.6)	43.0 (109.4)	44.0 (111.2)
Mean daily maximum °C (°F)	28.6 (83.5)	29.2 (84.6)	25.9 (78.6)	21.6 (70.9)	17.6 (63.7)	15.0 (59.0)	14.4 (57.9)	15.5 (59.9)	17.2 (63.0)	20.3 (68.5)	23.1 (73.6)	25.8 (78.4)	21.2 (70.2)
Mean daily minimum °C (°F)	11.7 (53.1)	12.0 (53.6)	11.0 (51.8)	8.8 (47.8)	7.3 (45.1)	5.3 (41.5)	5.1 (41.2)	5.8 (42.4)	6.6 (43.9)	7.6 (45.7)	8.8 (47.8)	10.4 (50.7)	8.4 (47.1)
Record low °C (°F)	3.4 (38.1)	2.3 (36.1)	1.1 (34.0)	−2.2 (28.0)	−2.8 (27.0)	−3.7 (25.3)	−4.2 (24.4)	−2.9 (26.8)	−2.3 (27.9)	−1.7 (28.9)	−0.5 (31.1)	0.6 (33.1)	−4.2 (24.4)
Average rainfall mm (inches)	22.7 (0.89)	19.2 (0.76)	25.9 (1.02)	45.2 (1.78)	64.1 (2.52)	78.9 (3.11)	87.2 (3.43)	79.4 (3.13)	63.8 (2.51)	49.0 (1.93)	33.9 (1.33)	32.3 (1.27)	601.6 (23.68)
Average rainy days (≥ 0.2mm)	4.8	3.9	5.7	9.5	13.3	14.8	16.8	16.8	14.3	10.7	8.1	6.6	125.3
Source: Bureau of Meteorology

== See also ==
- Vivigani Ardune Conservation Park
