= Sea spinach =

Sea spinach is a common name for several plants and may refer to:

- Beta vulgaris subsp. maritima, native to Europe and North Africa
- Mesembryanthemum aitonis
- Tetragonia decumbens, native to southern Africa
- Tetragonia tetragonioides, native to New Zealand, Australia, Japan and southern South America
