= Rivoli =

Rivoli may refer to:

== Places ==
- Rivoli, Piedmont, a comune in Turin, Italy
- Rivoli Veronese, a comune in the province of Verona, Italy
- Rivoli Bay, a bay in South Australia
- Rivoli Township, Mercer County, Illinois, US
- Rue de Rivoli, a street in Paris

== Structures ==
- Rivoli (Turin Metro), a railway station in Rivoli, Piedmont
- The Rivoli, a restaurant/club in Toronto, Ontario, Canada
- The Rivoli Ballroom, a dance venue in South London, UK
- Rivoli Cinemas, a multiplex cinema in Melbourne, Australia
- Rivoli Theatre (disambiguation), several theaters

== Other uses ==
- Rivoli (surname)
- Rivoli United F.C., a Jamaican football club
- Battle of Rivoli, a 1797 battle near Rivoli Veronese
- SS Rivoli, originally Empire Bute, a coaster in service with A Scotto Pugliese Fils & Compagnie, Algeria, 1948–1952
