= Penguin Island (South Australia) =

Island in South Australia

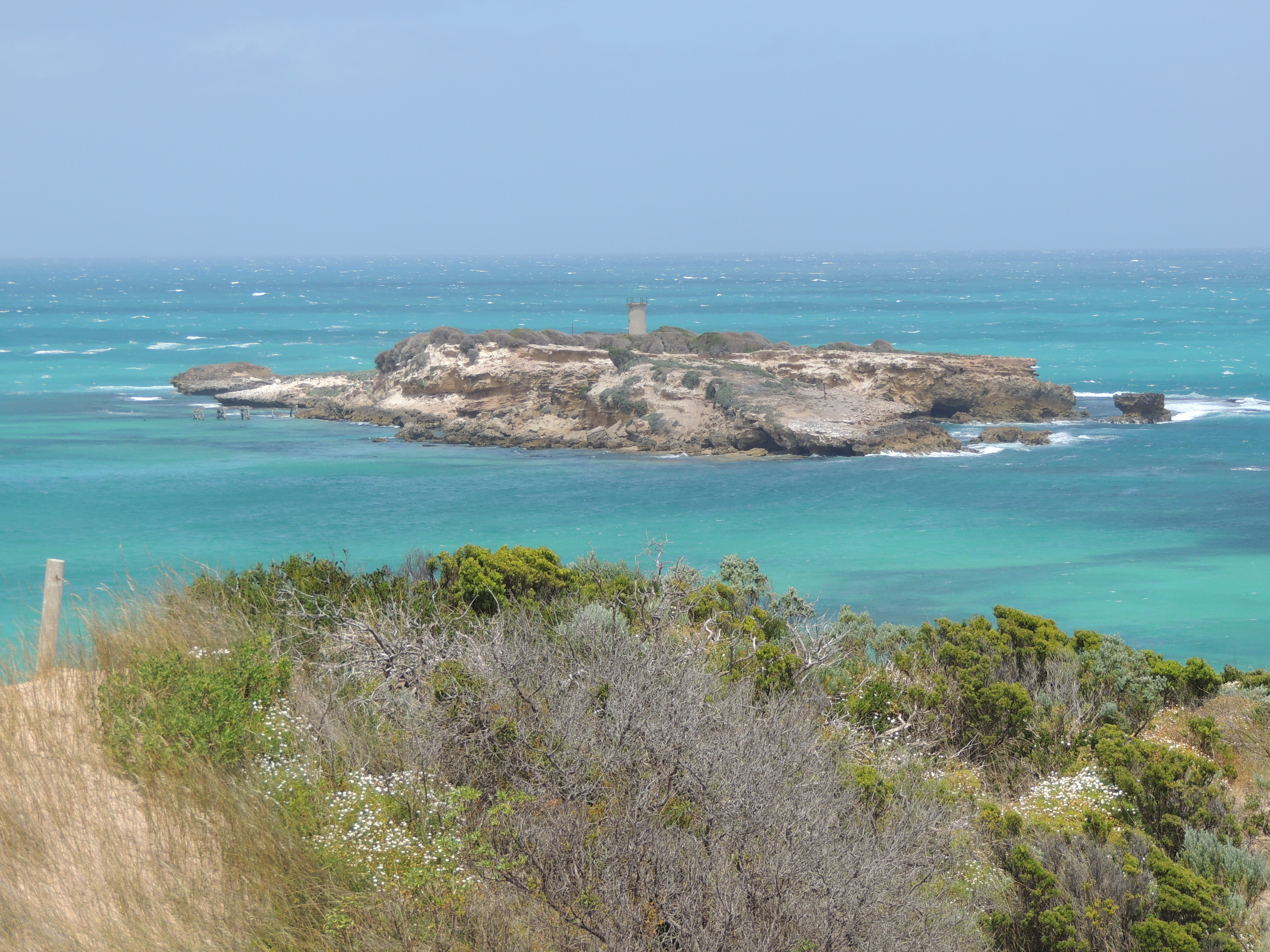
- View of Penguin Island from Cape Martin, South Australia

- Location within South Australia

Geography
- Location: Rivoli Bay
- Coordinates: 37°29′54″S 140°00′50″E
- Area: 2.02 ha (5.0 acres)
- Highest elevation: 16 m (52 ft)

Administration
- Australia

Demographics
- Population: 0

Penguin Island is an island in the Australian state of South Australia located in Rivoli Bay on the state's south east coast of approximately 1.5 kilometres (0.93 miles) south of Beachport. From 1878 to 1960, it was the site of an operating lighthouse. Since at least 1972, it has been part of the Penguin Island Conservation Park.

== Description ==
Penguin Island is located about 1.5 kilometres (0.93 miles) south of Beachport and about 120 metres (390 feet) south-east of the headland known as Cape Martin. The island consists of two outcrops which are reported as being unofficially known as Outer Penguin Island and Inner Penguin Island. The latter outcrop came into existence in 1968 when a storm caused the collapse of a section of Cape Martin thereby creating a channel of about 40 metres (130 feet) in width between the remains of the headland and an isolated stack of remnant cliff now known as Inner Penguin Island. Both outcrops are surrounded by vertical cliffs that rise to between 10 metres (33 feet) to 15 metres (49 feet) in height above sea level, with exception to the south-western end of the outer island where the ground falls steeply to a rocky spit. A wave cut platform surrounds most of the island. The major outcrop along with minor outcrops and submerged strata form an island which is about 400 metres (1,300 feet) long and up to 150 metres (490 feet) wide. The island is partially covered with sand which itself has partially developed in a soil. The inner island was reported in 1994 as being accessible by foot at low water while the outer island could only be accessed by boat or by swimming.

== Formation, geology and oceanography ==
Penguin Island was formed about 6000 years ago when sea levels rose at the start of the Holocene. The island is composed of Bridgewater Formation calcareous sandstone which is a remnant of now partially submerged Robe Range which was formed during the Pleistocene. The island which is located in relatively shallow water rises from a depth of 10 m (33 ft) within 1,000 m (3,300 ft) to its west, 200 m (660 ft) to its south and 300 m (980 ft) to its east.

== Flora and fauna ==
=== Flora ===
As of 1994, Penguin Island was reported as having a low shrubland dominated by grey saltbush while as of 1996, it was reported as having a shrubland dominated by coastal daisybush. Other species present as of 1996 included native species fleshy saltbush, austral seablite, bower spinach and leafy peppercress while introduced species included Athel pines, African boxthorn and mallows. In 1977, an introduced species, marram grass was planted on the inner island to stabilise sand drift and to assist in the regeneration of native vegetation.

=== Fauna ===
As of 1996, Penguin Island was reported as accommodating breeding populations of little penguins, crested terns, short-tailed shearwaters and silver gulls. In addition to being notable as being a breeding ground for seabirds, the island is also known as a site for the study of both the crested tern and the silver gull. The crested tern and silver gull population has been the subject of banding programs respectively since 1953 and 1968. Feral birds such as starlings and feral pigeons have also been recorded on Penguin Island. Mammal species observed on the island include Australian fur seals and rabbits which have been specifically observed on the inner island.

== History ==
=== Aboriginal use ===
As Penguin Island has been historically accessible by foot at low water, it is possible that local Aboriginal people may have used the island as a source of food, particularly sea birds such as little penguins and silver gulls.

=== European discovery ===
Penguin Island was first described by Baudin in 1802 possibly in respect to its relevance as a source of danger to navigation:

It ends in a fitting cape [Cape Martin], at the tip of which there lies a small island [Penguin Island], reaching about half a league out to sea. Its southern section is low and narrow, but the northern part is [higher] and can be seen from a fair way off. The island is completely surrounded by rocks and so is hardly approachable. The same applies to the whole coast, which is shielded by a reef and a line of more or less large rocks that prevent any landing there (Baudin, in Cornell, 1974).

While it appears that Baudin did not name the island, it is likely that its naming was made in acknowledgement of the presence of little penguins on the island.

=== Navigation aids ===
The island was the site of an operating lighthouse from 1878 to 1960 until its service was replaced by the Cape Martin Lighthouse. As of 1994, the lighthouse tower, a shed and a small jetty on the east side of the island were still present with the former two reported as being in ‘reasonable condition’, while the jetty was reported as having ‘fallen into disrepair’.

== Protected areas status ==
Since 1961, Penguin Island has enjoyed protected area status and at least since 1972, it has been part of the Penguin Island Conservation Park.

== Citations and references ==
=== References ===
- Boating Industry Association of South Australia (BIA); South Australia. Department for Environment and Heritage (2005), South Australia's waters an atlas & guide, Boating Industry Association of South Australia, ISBN 978-1-86254-680-6
- South Australia. Department of Marine and Harbors (DMH) (1985), The Waters of South Australia a series of charts, sailing notes and coastal photographs, Dept. of Marine and Harbors, South Australia, pp. Chart 3, ISBN 978-0-7243-7603-2
- National Parks and Wildlife Service (NPWS) (1990). Small Coastal Parks of the South East Management Plan (PDF). National Parks and Wildlife Service, Department of Environment and Planning, South Australia. ISBN 978-0-7308-4651-2.
- Parsons, Ronald (1985), Lighthouses of South Australia, R. Parsons, ISBN 978-0-909418-35-9
- A.C., Robinson; Canty, P.; Mooney, T.; Rudduck, P. (1996). South Australia's offshore islands (PDF). Canberra: Australian Heritage Commission. ISBN 0-644350-11-3.
