= Penguin Island Conservation Park =

Protected area in South Australia

- IUCN category Ia (strict nature reserve)
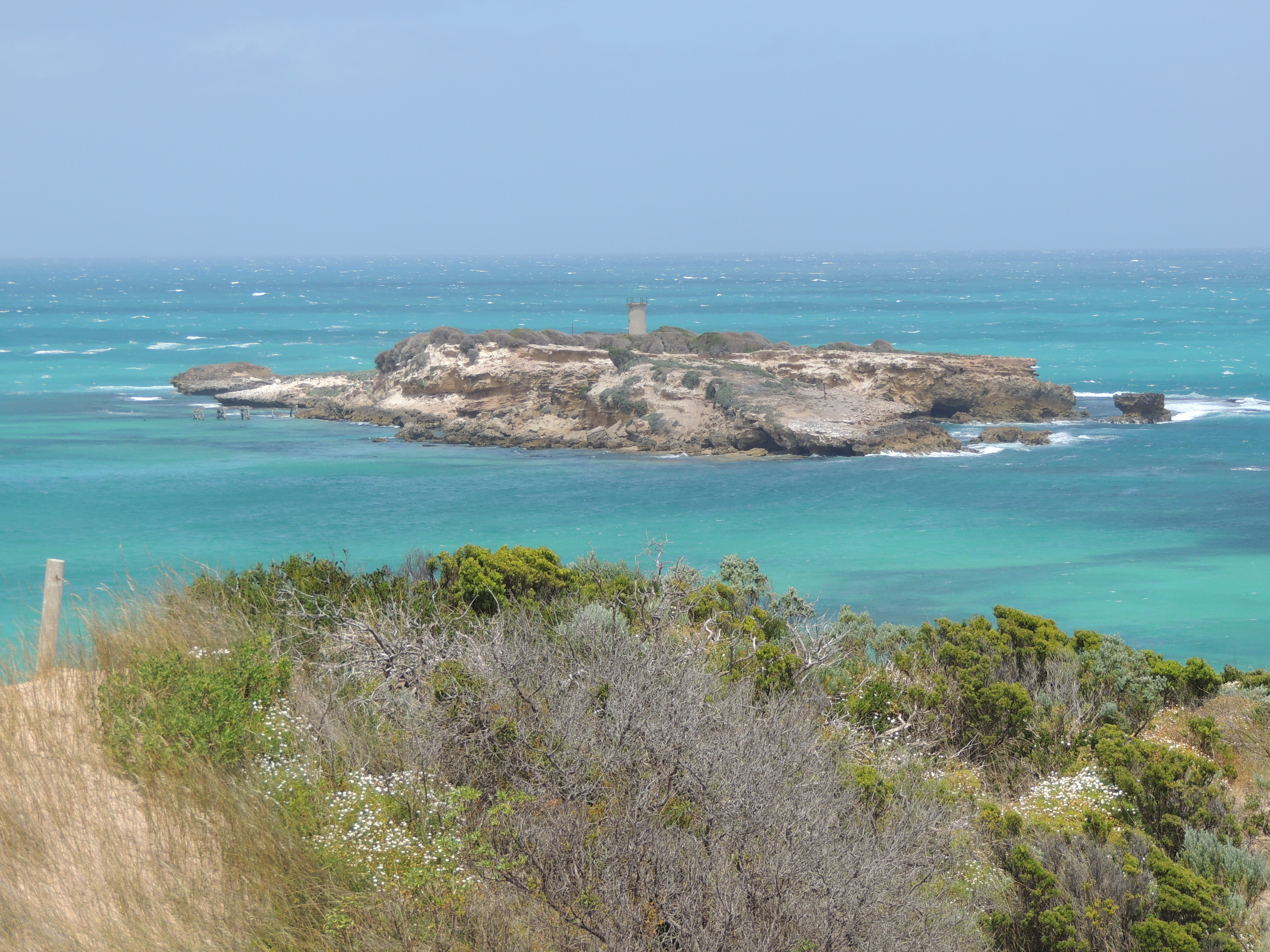
- View of Penguin Island from Cape Martin, South Australia

- Location within South Australia
- Location: South Australia
- Nearest city: Beachport
- Coordinates: 37°29′48″S 140°0′48″E/
- Area: 6 ha (15 acres)
- Established: 1 August 1963
- Governing body: Department for Environment and Water

Penguin Island Conservation Park (formerly Penguin Island National Parks Reserve) is a protected area occupying Penguin Island and part of Cape Martin on the mainland in Rivoli Bay on the south east coast of South Australia about 1 kilometre (0.62 miles) south of Beachport.

The land on Penguin Island became subject to protection after the decommissioning of the Penguin Island Lighthouse in 1960 due to recognition by the South Australian government of "the importance of Penguin Island as a seabird haven". Initially, the island was resumed under the Crown Lands Act 1929-57 and then it was declared as a "closed area" under the Animals and Birds Protection Act 1919-1953. In 1961, the island was established as a wildlife reserve. On 9 November 1967, the entire island was proclaimed under the National Parks Act 1966 as Penguin Island National Parks Reserve. Land associated with Cape Martin was added to the protected area in 1970 and 1976 respectively.

The conservation park is classified as an IUCN Category IA protected area.
