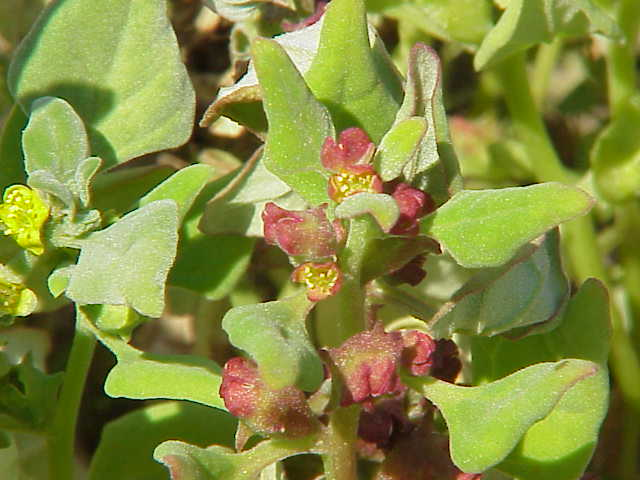

Scientific classification
- Kingdom: Plantae
- Clade: Tracheophytes
- Clade: Angiosperms
- Clade: Eudicots
- Order: Caryophyllales
- Family: Aizoaceae
- Genus: Tetragonia
- Species: T. echinata

Binomial name
- Tetragonia echinata Aiton

= Tetragonia echinata =

Species of succulent

Tetragonia echinata is a Southern African annual spreading plant, common in open or disturbed areas.

== Description ==
The species is highly variable. However, it is usually a decumbent, spreading, papulose, semi-succulent annual.

The leaves are often rounded oval-triangular, with clear stalks (petiolate).

The flowers are in groups (3 to 5 or more), on short pedicels.

The fruit has ridges, each ridge with spiney protrusions.

== Distribution ==
Its distribution extends from Riviersonderend and Stormsvlei (Swellendam) in the south west, eastwards through Ashton, Riversdale and the Little Karoo as far east as Grahamstown. Northwards it occurs near Hex River, Laingsburg and Prince Albert as far north-east as Cradock.

It is also a pioneer species that is often found on roadsides, open spaces or disturbed areas.
