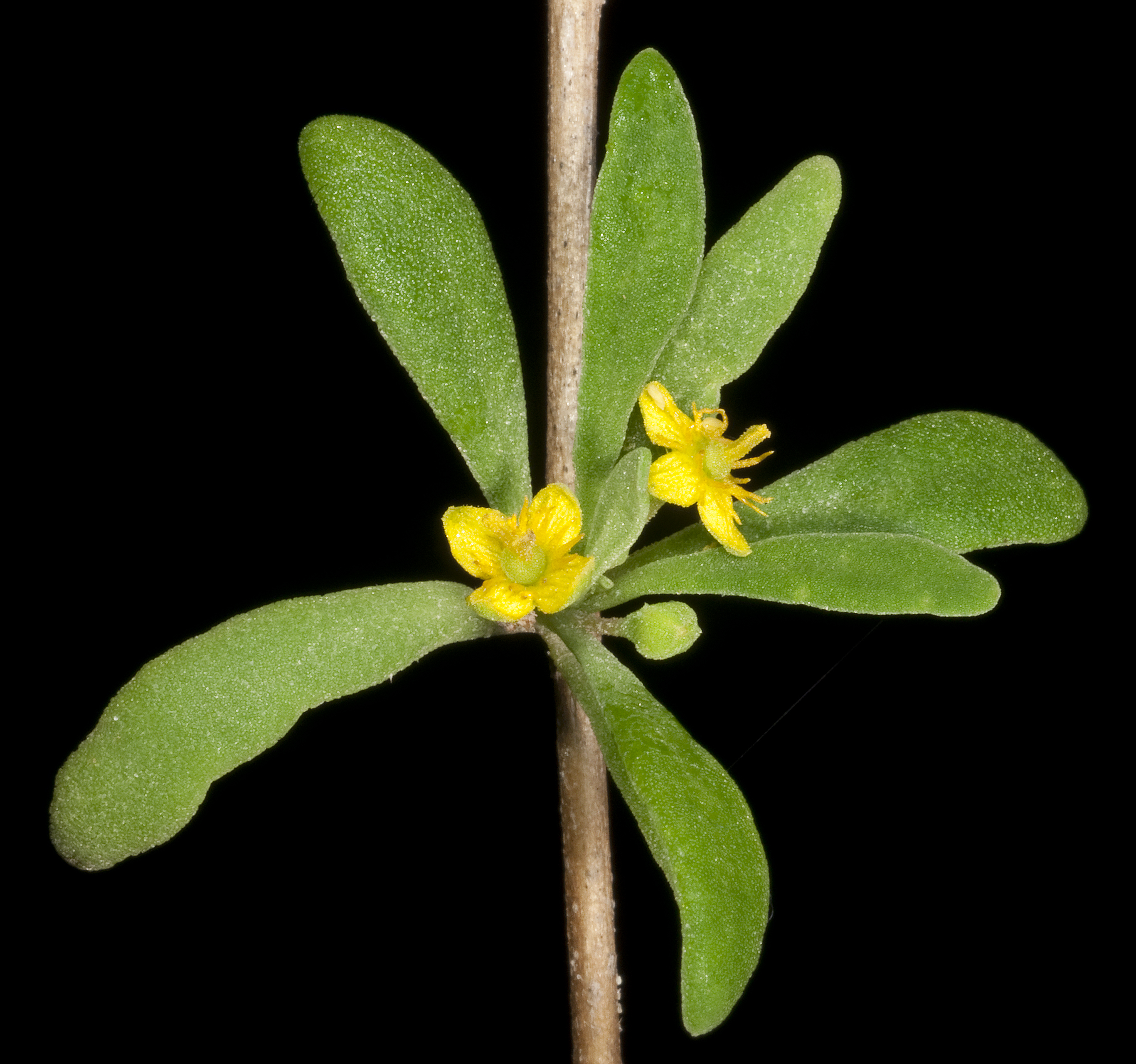
- Tetragonia implexicoma

Scientific classification
- Kingdom: Plantae
- Clade: Tracheophytes
- Clade: Angiosperms
- Clade: Eudicots
- Order: Caryophyllales
- Family: Aizoaceae
- Genus: Tetragonia
- Species: T. implexicoma

Binomial name
- Tetragonia implexicoma (Miq.) Hook.f.

Synonyms
- Tetragonia trigyna Banks & Sol. ex Hook.f.

= Tetragonia implexicoma =

Species of plant

Tetragonia implexicoma, commonly known as bower spinach, is a species of plant in the Aizoaceae, or ice-plant family. A similar species is Tetragonia tetragonioides, however this species has larger leaves and a shorter flowering time.

== Distribution and habitat ==
Bower spinach is found mainly in coastal regions of New Zealand and southern Australia as well as on many nearby island groups. It occupies a variety of habitats from sand and shingle beaches through coastal woodland, shrubland and grassland, and as exposed, salt-pruned vegetation on cliffs and stacks. It may also be found well inland, in farmland where it is grown in barberry hedges, or on calcareous sandstone or limestone outcrops in dense forest.

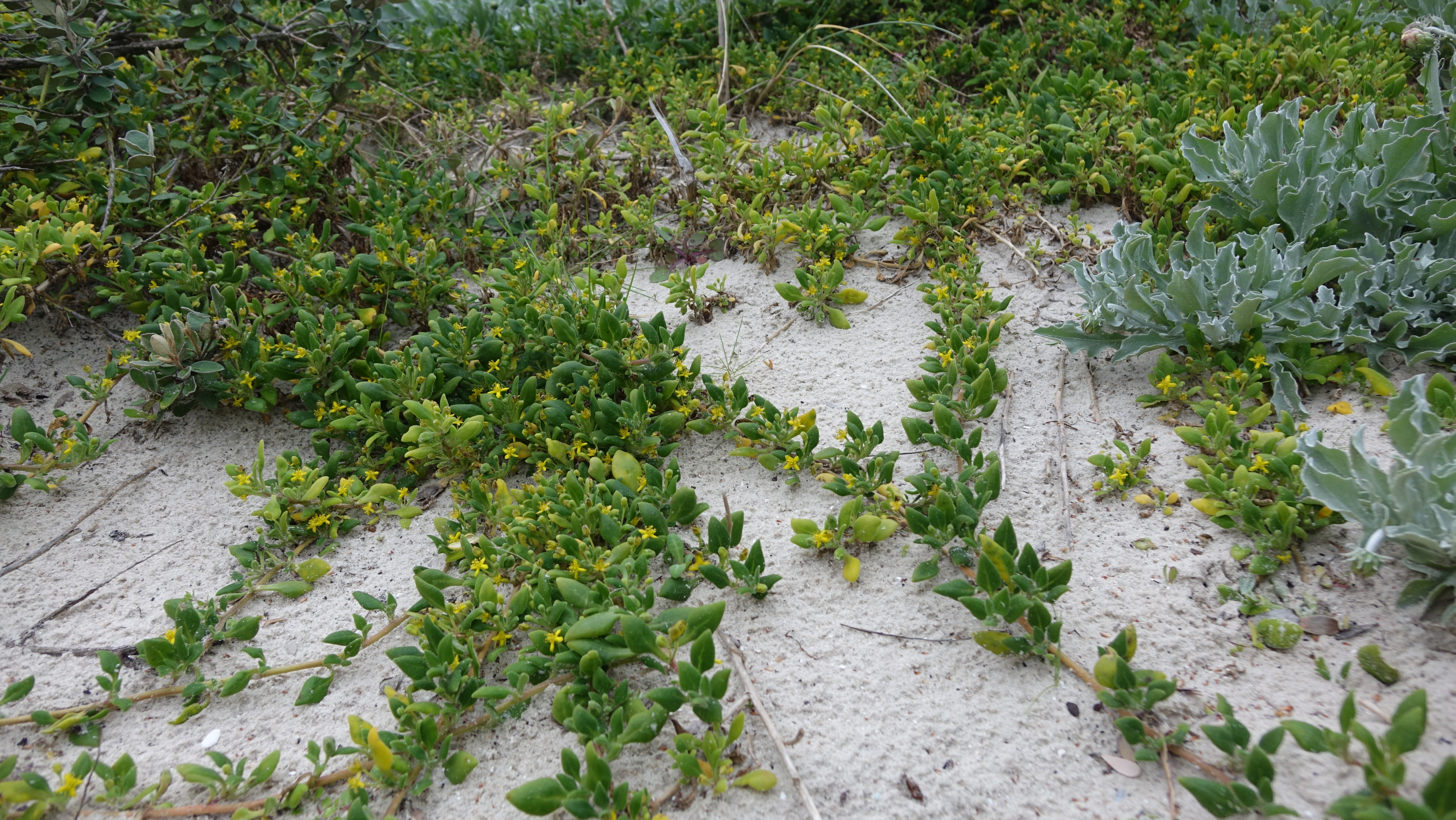
Tetragonia implexicoma as a groundcover. Located on beach foredune in Carrum.

== Description ==
Bower spinach is a scrambling subshrub that forms dense leafy patches of up to 4 metres (13 ft). The stems are long and trailing, often succulent and coloured red or pink when young, maturing to dark green to brown-black and becoming woody. The leaves are alternate, clustered and semi-succulent. Leaves are rhombic to angular-ovate, sometimes bearing coarse hairs when young. The yellow flowers are solitary, strongly scented and have 12-20 stamens; 2 styles. Flowering August to November. The fruits are 5–8 millimetres (0.20–0.31 in) long, pink to dark red, succulent berries which are eaten by birds and lizards. It is being planted on Phillip Island as a fire retardant plant.
