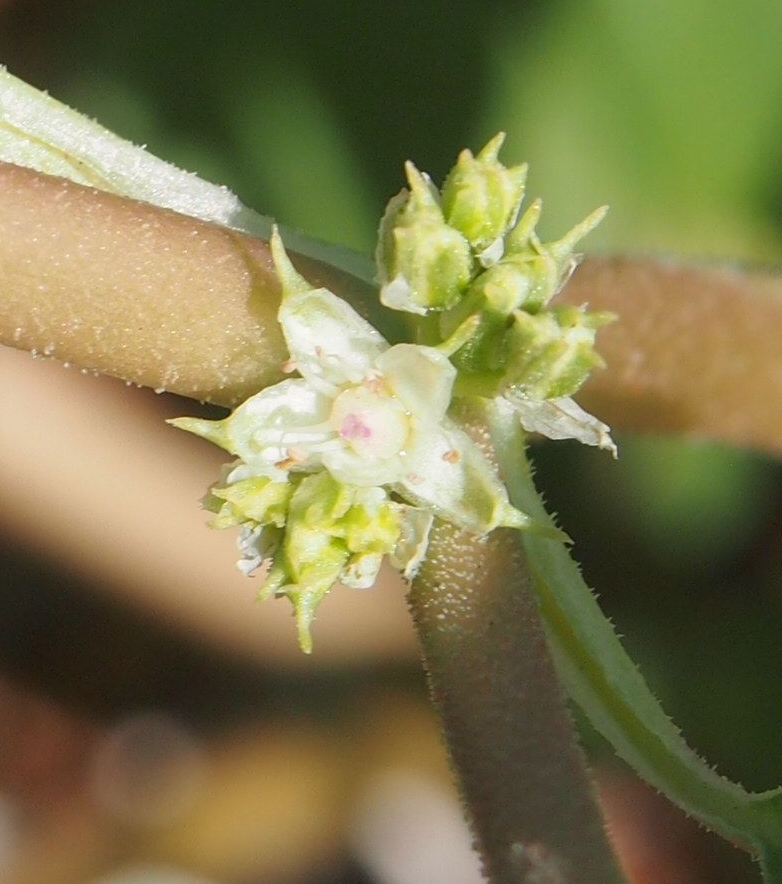

Scientific classification
- Kingdom: Plantae
- Clade: Tracheophytes
- Clade: Angiosperms
- Clade: Eudicots
- Order: Caryophyllales
- Family: Aizoaceae
- Genus: Tetragonia
- Species: T. eremaea

Binomial name
- Tetragonia eremaea Ostenf.

= Tetragonia eremaea =

Species of succulent

Tetragonia eremaea is a member of the genus Tetragonia and is endemic to Australia.

The annual herb has a prostrate habit that typically grows to a height of 3 to 20 centimetres (1.2 to 7.9 in). It blooms between August and October producing yellow-green flowers.

The plant is often found over granite or limestone and has a distribution throughout southern Australia

The species was first formally described by the botanist Carl Hansen Ostenfeld in 1921 in the article Contributions to West Australian Botany, part III : Additions and notes to the flora of extra-tropical W. Australia. in the journal Biologiske meddelelser, Kongelige Danske Videnskabernes Selskab.
