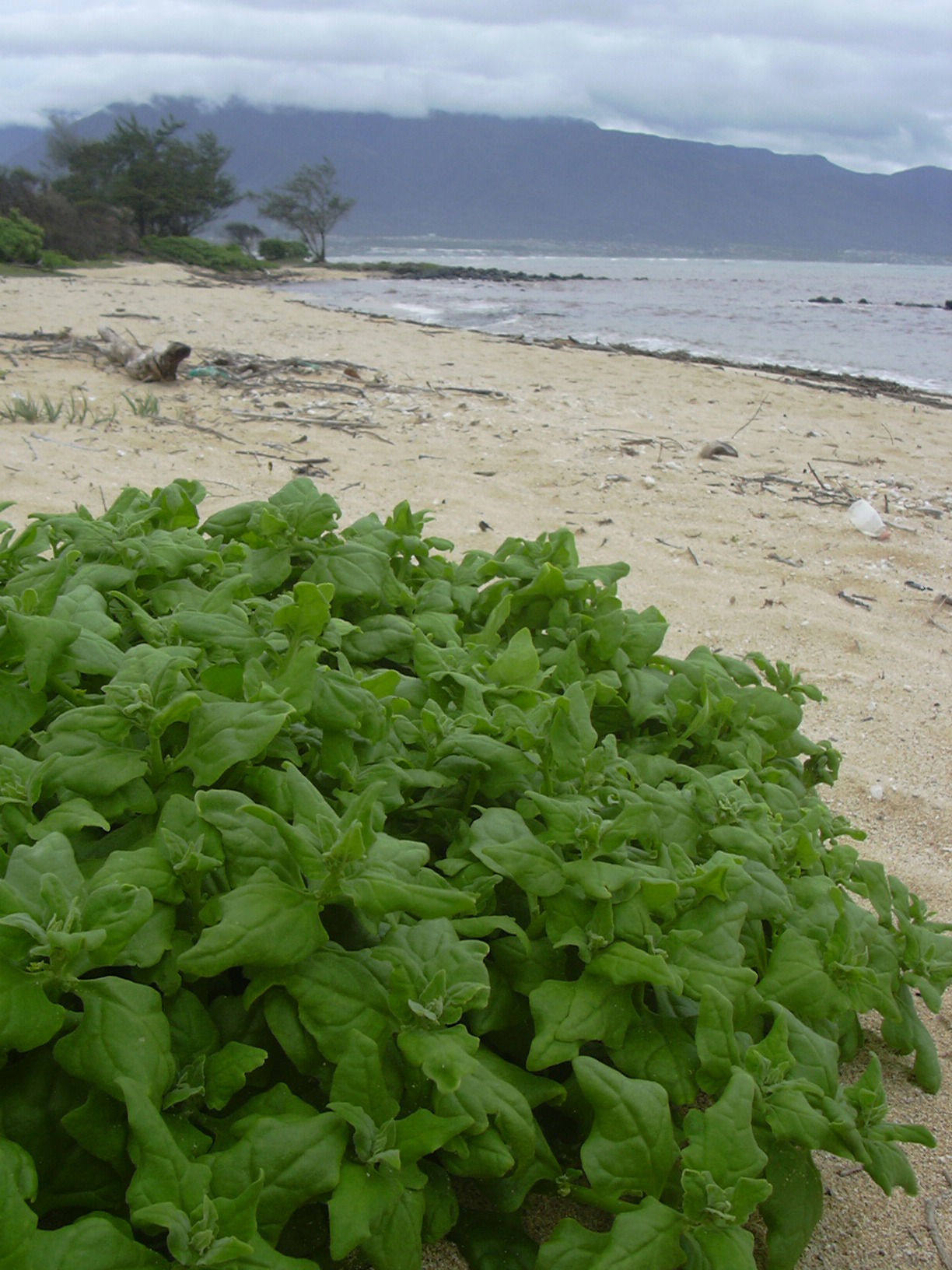
- Tetragonia tetragonoides

Scientific classification
- Kingdom: Plantae
- Clade: Embryophytes
- Clade: Tracheophytes
- Clade: Spermatophytes
- Clade: Angiosperms
- Clade: Eudicots
- Order: Caryophyllales
- Family: Aizoaceae
- Subfamily: Aizooideae
- Genus: Tetragonia; L.

Species
- 51, see text

Synonyms
- Demidovia Pall. (1781); Ludolfia Adans. (1763), nom. superfl.; Tetragonella Miq. (1845); Tetragonocarpos Mill. (1754)

= Tetragonia =

Genus of flowering plants

Tetragonia is a genus of 51 species of flowering plants in the family Aizoaceae, native to temperate and subtropical regions mostly of the Southern Hemisphere, in New Zealand, Australia, southern and eastern Africa, and western South America, and eastern Asia.

== Description ==
Plants of the genus Tetragonia are herbs or small shrubs. Leaves are alternate and succulent, with flowers typically yellow and small in size. Flowers can be axillary, solitary or fasciculate, greenish or yellowish in colour and mostly bisexual. Fruit are initially succulent but become dry and woody with age.

The genus name comes from "tetragonus", meaning "four-angled" (as in a tetragon) and referring to the shape of the plants' fruits.

Sphaeraphides occur in at least the leaves and stalks of at least some species. Leaves are approximately kite shaped.

== Distribution ==
About forty species of Tetragonia are found in southern Africa, from Angola to South Africa. They also occur in Australia, eastern Africa (Kenya and Ethiopia), western south America (Peru and Chile), and Asia (Japan, Korea, Taiwan, southern China, Myanmar, and Vietnam).

== Classification ==
The genus was first formally described by the botanist Carl Linnaeus in 1753 in the work Species Plantarum. Synonyms for the genus include Tetragonocarpos Mill., Demidovia Pall., and Tetragonella Miq.

== Human use and cultivation ==
The best known species of Tetragonia is the leafy vegetable food crop, Tetragonia tetragonoides ("New Zealand spinach"). New Zealand spinach is widely cultivated as a summer leafy vegetable.

Some of the other species are also eaten locally, such as Tetragonia decumbens ("Dune spinach") which is a local delicacy in its native southern Africa.

== Species ==
51 species are accepted.

- Tetragonia acanthocarpa Adamson
- Tetragonia angustifolia Barnéoud
- Tetragonia arbuscula Fenzl
- Tetragonia caesia Adamson
- Tetragonia calycina Fenzl
- Tetragonia chenopodioides Eckl. & Zeyh.
- Tetragonia copiapina Phil.
- Tetragonia coronata Rye & Trudgen
- Tetragonia cristata C.A.Gardner ex A.M.Prescott
- Tetragonia crystallina L'Hér.
- Tetragonia decumbens Mill.
- Tetragonia diptera F.Muell.
- Tetragonia distorta Fenzl
- Tetragonia echinata Aiton
- Tetragonia erecta Adamson
- Tetragonia eremaea Ostenf.
- Tetragonia espinosae Muñoz
- Tetragonia fruticosa L.
- Tetragonia galenioides Fenzl
- Tetragonia glauca Fenzl
- Tetragonia halimoides Fenzl
- Tetragonia haworthii Fenzl
- Tetragonia herbacea L.
- Tetragonia hirsuta L.f.
- Tetragonia implexicoma (Miq.) Hook.f.
- Tetragonia lasiantha Adamson
- Tetragonia macrocarpa Phil.
- Tetragonia macroptera Pax
- Tetragonia maritima Barnéoud
- Tetragonia microcarpa Phil.
- Tetragonia microptera Fenzl
- Tetragonia moorei M.Gray
- Tetragonia namaquensis Schltr.
- Tetragonia nigrescens Eckl. & Zeyh.
- Tetragonia ovata Phil.
- Tetragonia pedunculata Phil.
- Tetragonia pillansii Adamson
- Tetragonia portulacoides Fenzl
- Tetragonia rangeana Engl.
- Tetragonia reduplicata Welw. ex Oliv.
- Tetragonia robusta Fenzl
- Tetragonia rosea Schltr.
- Tetragonia saligna Fenzl
- Tetragonia sarcophylla Fenzl
- Tetragonia sphaerocarpa Adamson
- Tetragonia spicata L.f.
- Tetragonia tetragonoides (Pall.) Kuntze
- Tetragonia trigyna Banks & Sol. ex Hook.f.
- Tetragonia verrucosa Fenzl
- Tetragonia vestita I.M.Johnst.
- Tetragonia virgata Schltr.

=== Formerly placed here ===
- Anisostigma schenckii (Schinz) Schinz (as Tetragonia schenckii Schinz)

== Gallery ==
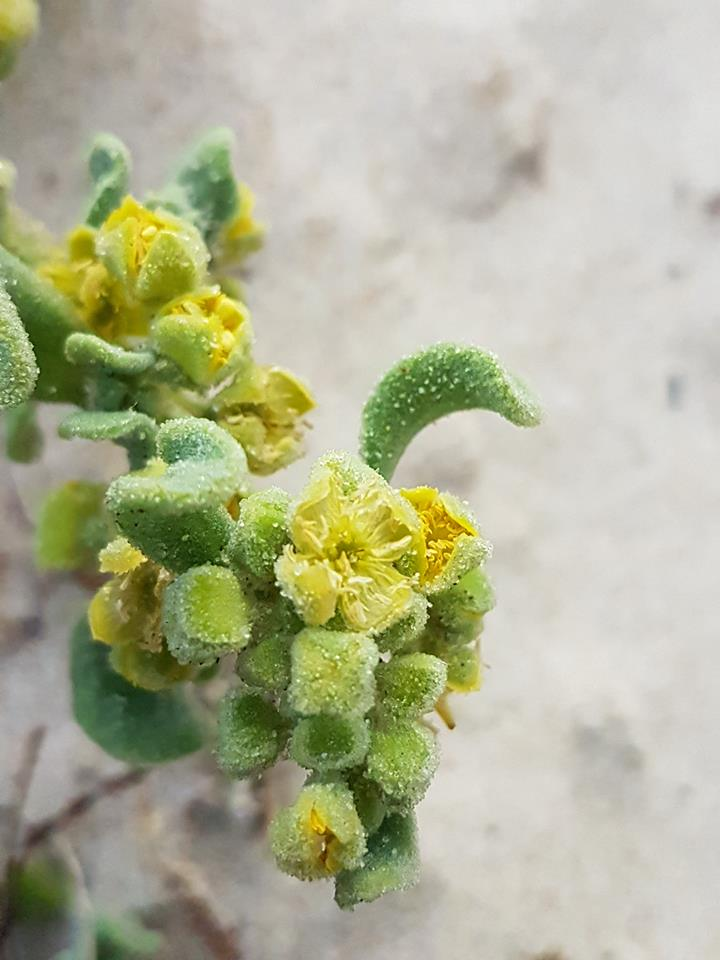
Tetragonia decumbens

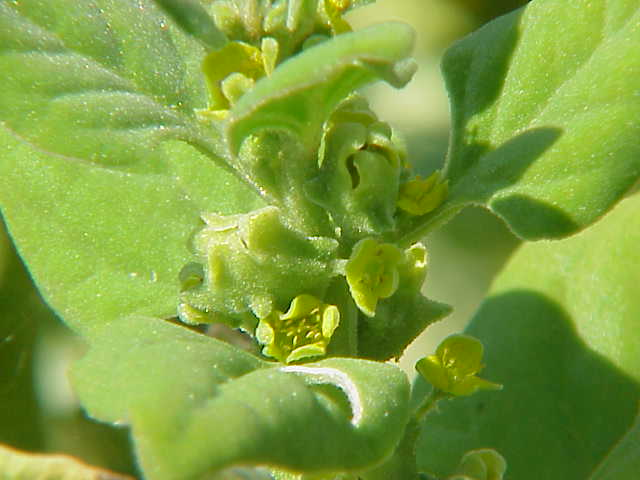
Tetragonia echinata

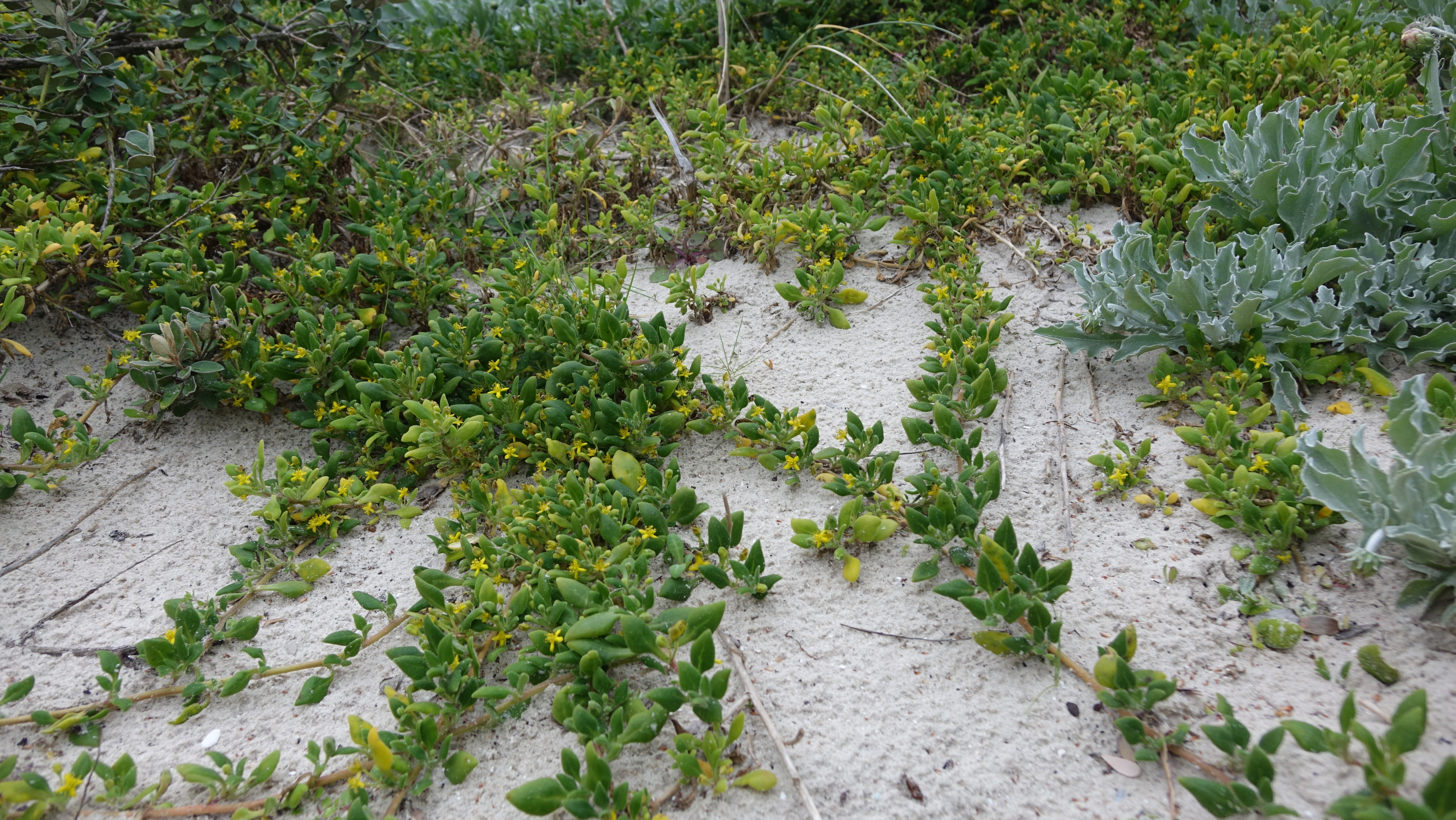
Tetragonia implexicoma

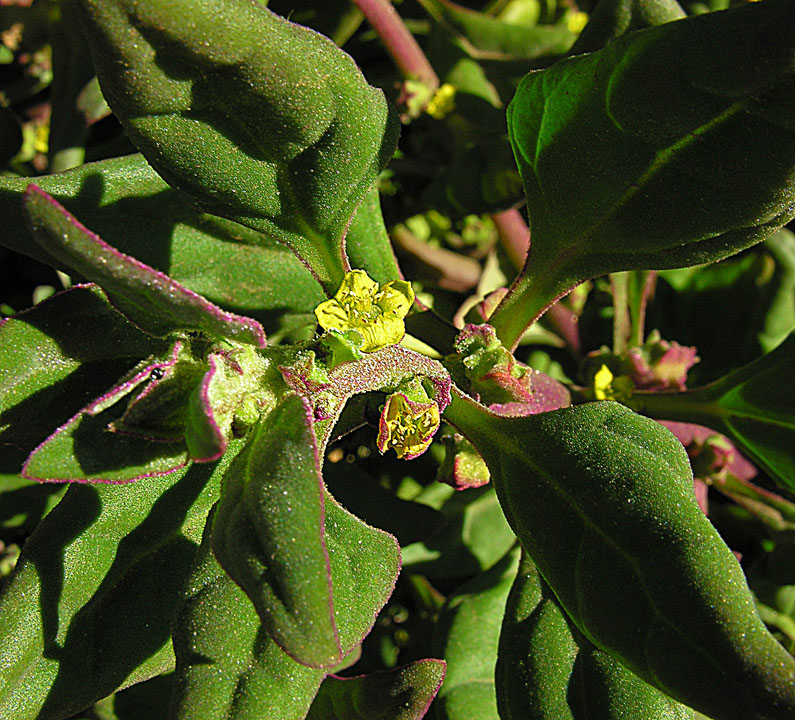
Tetragonia ovata

== Bibliography ==
- Gulliver, George (1864). "Observations on Raphides and other Crystals". The Annals and Magazine of Natural History, Including Zoology, Botany, and Geology. Third Series. 14: 250–252.
