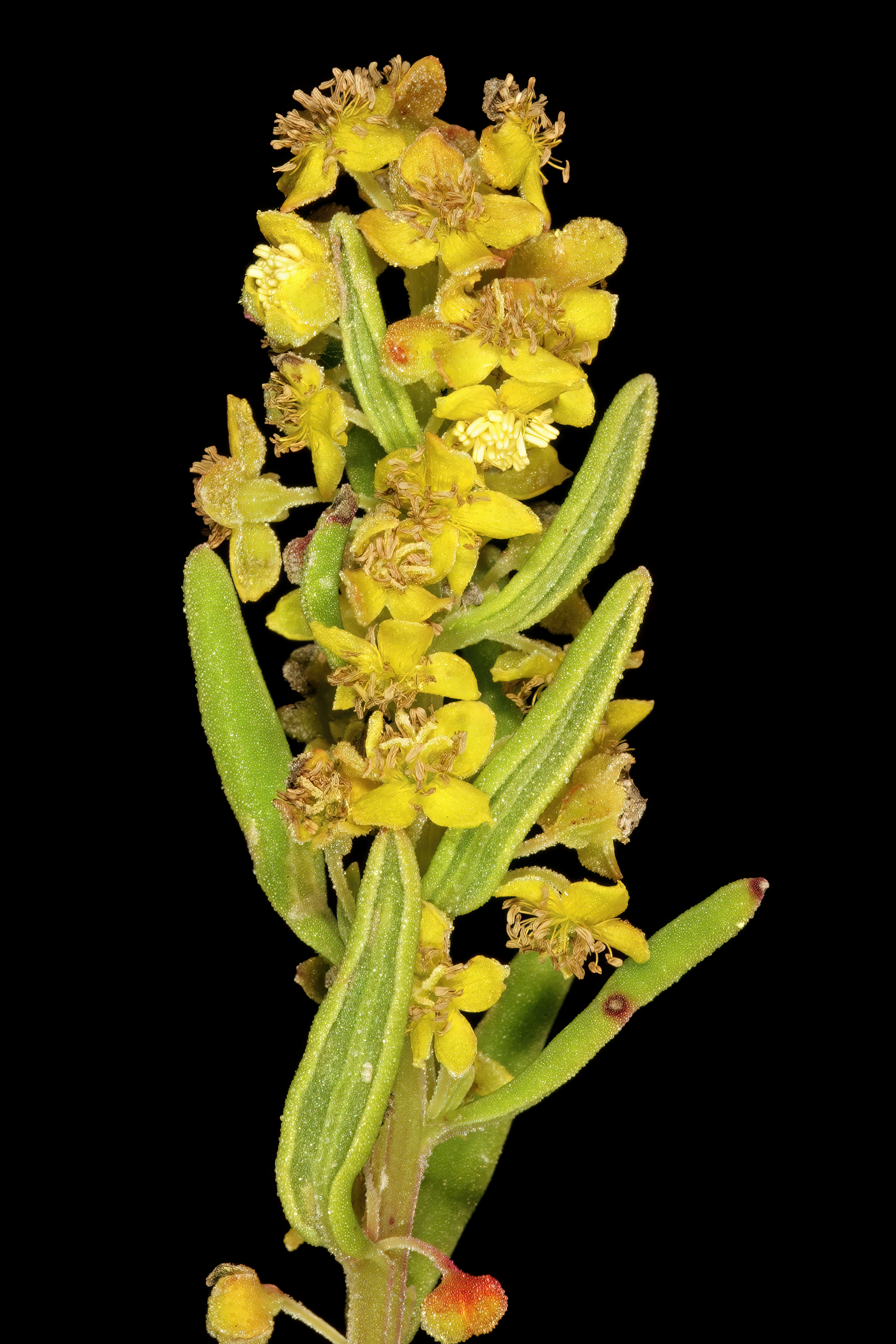

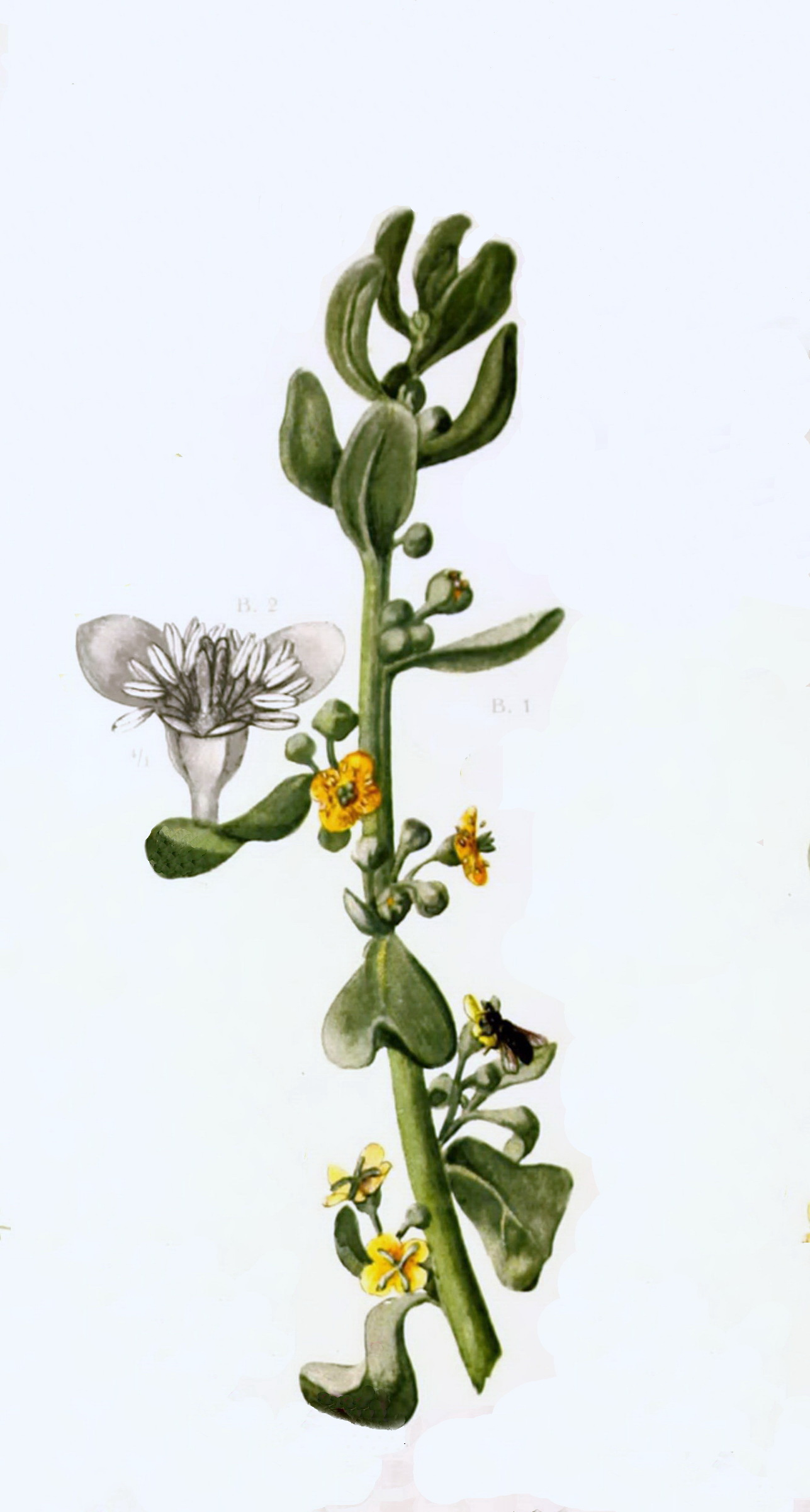

Scientific classification
- Kingdom: Plantae
- Clade: Tracheophytes
- Clade: Angiosperms
- Clade: Eudicots
- Order: Caryophyllales
- Family: Aizoaceae
- Genus: Tetragonia
- Species: T. fruticosa

Binomial name
- Tetragonia fruticosa L. (1753)

Synonyms
- Tetragonia fruticosa var. lanceolata Fenzl; Tetragonia fruticosa var. linearis (Haw.) Fenzl; Tetragonia lanceolata Burm.f.; Tetragonia linearis Haw.

= Tetragonia fruticosa =

Species of succulent

Tetragonia fruticosa, or kinkelbossie, is a coastal perennial shrub or scrambler endemic to Namibia. It is well-suited to dune sand stabilisation and often browsed by livestock and game. It is found from sea-level to about 1100 metres.

The fruits are unusual for Aizoaceae being four-winged, single-seeded and indehiscent. The wings are green and succulent at first, drying and becoming papery and brown, aiding in dispersal of the seed by wind. The flowers are a rich source of pollen and nectar for honeybees.

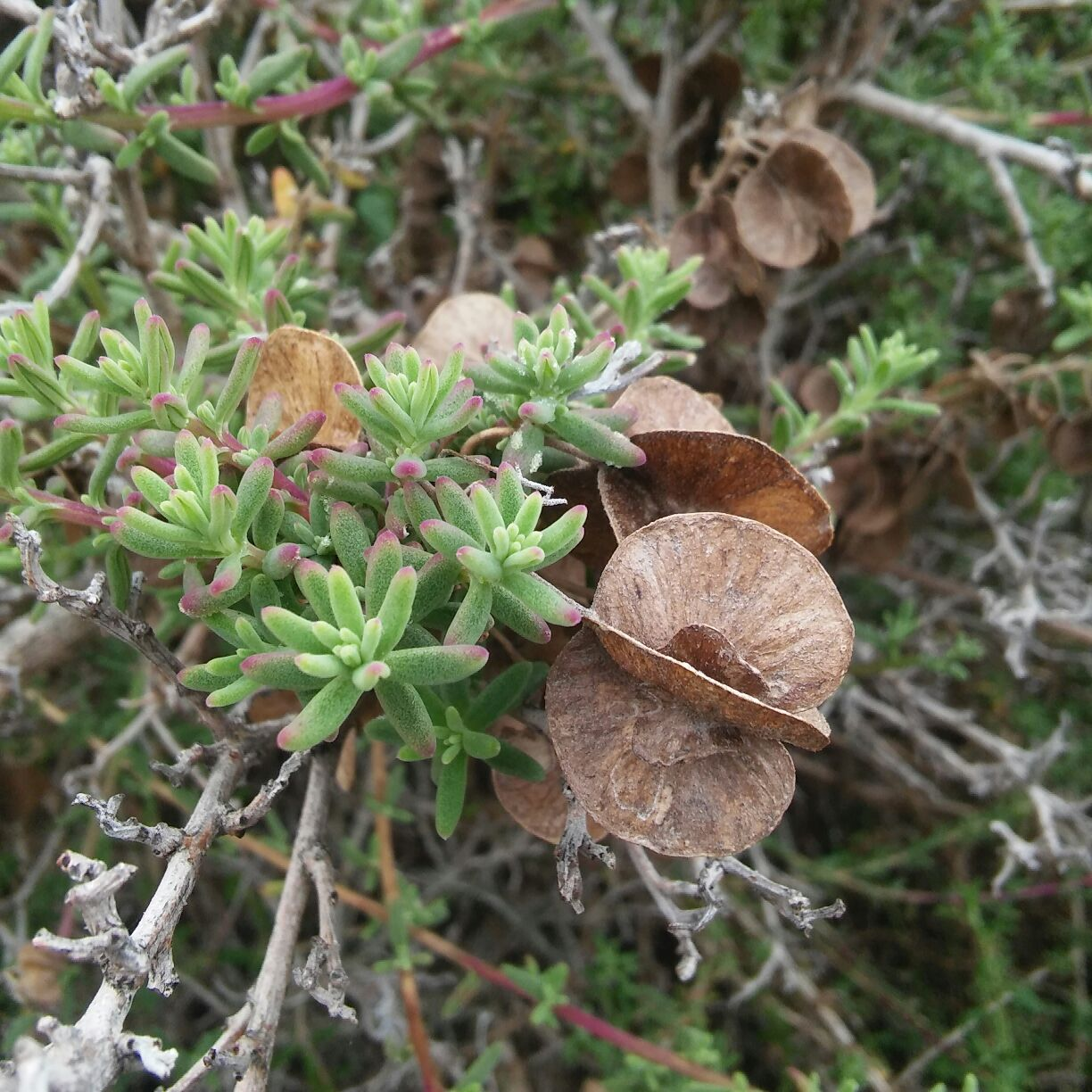

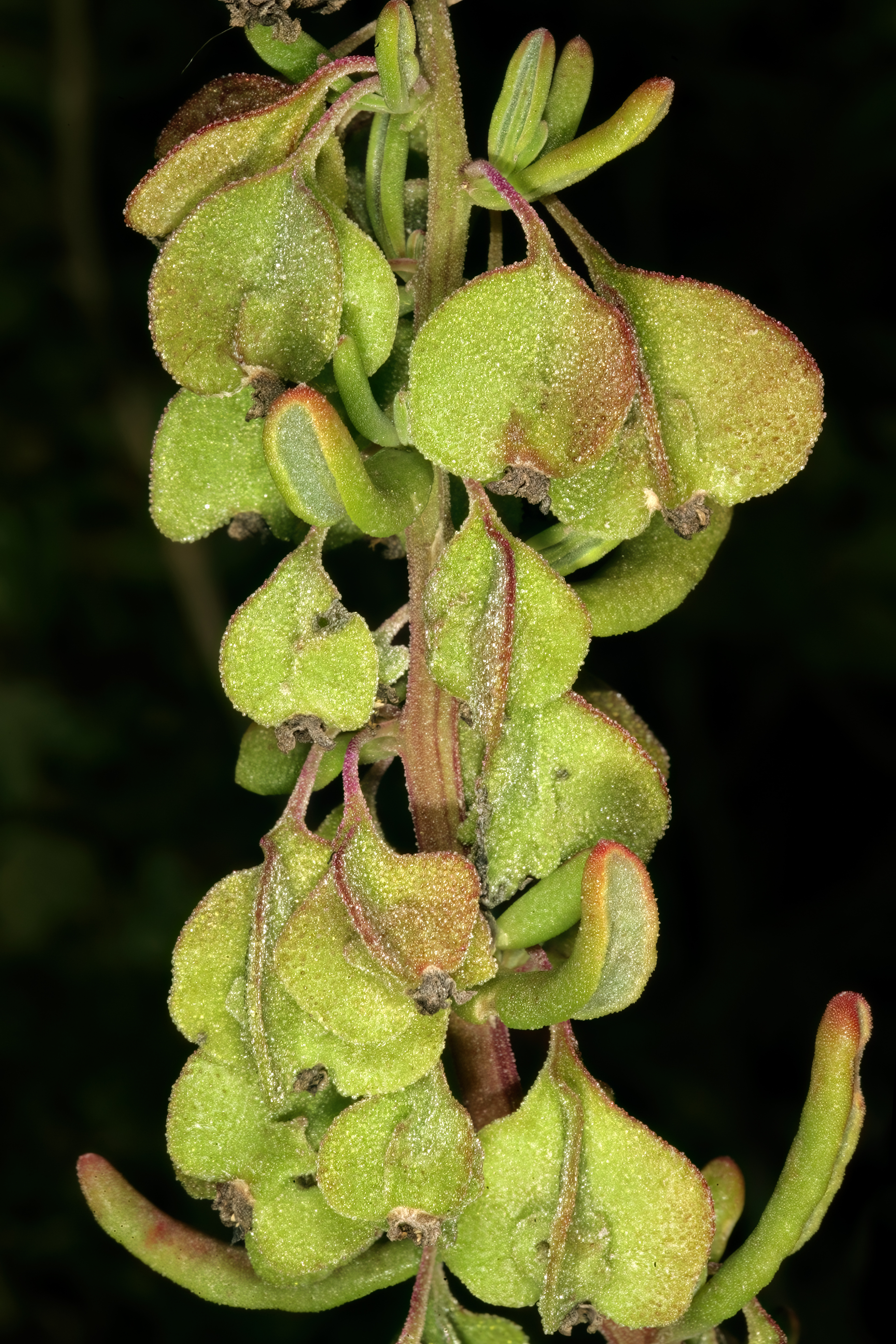

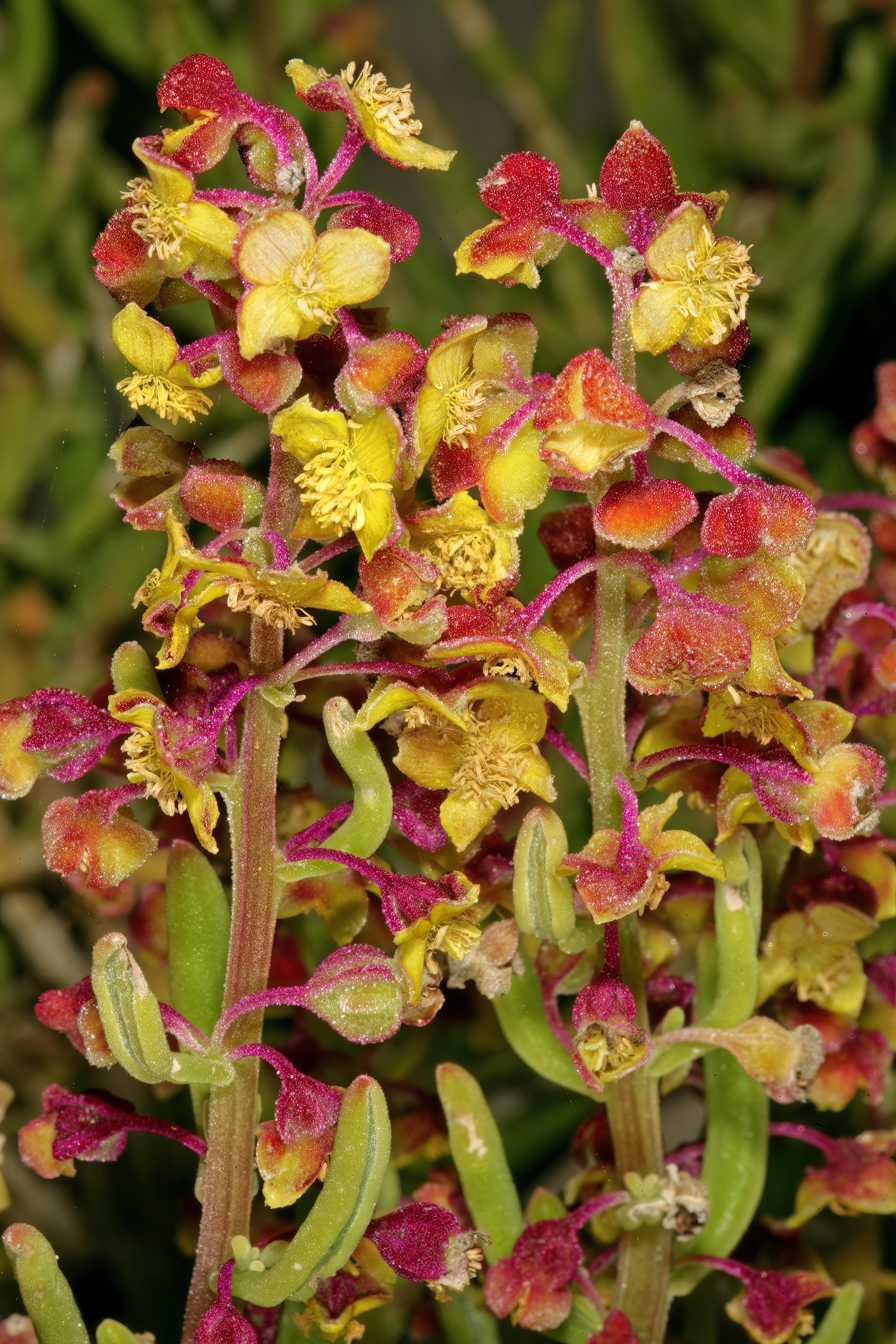
