= Tetragonia coronata =

Scientific classification
- Kingdom: Plantae
- Clade: Tracheophytes
- Clade: Angiosperms
- Clade: Eudicots
- Order: Caryophyllales
- Family: Aizoaceae
- Genus: Tetragonia
- Species: T. coronata

Binomial name
- Tetragonia coronata Rye & Trudgen

Species of succulent

Tetragonia coronata is a member of the genus Tetragonia and is endemic to Australia.

The annual herb has a decumbent habit. It blooms in July producing yellow flowers.

Often found among calcrete outcrops it has a scattered distribution throughout the Gascoyne region of Western Australia where it grows in clay loam soils.
