= Rivoli Bay =

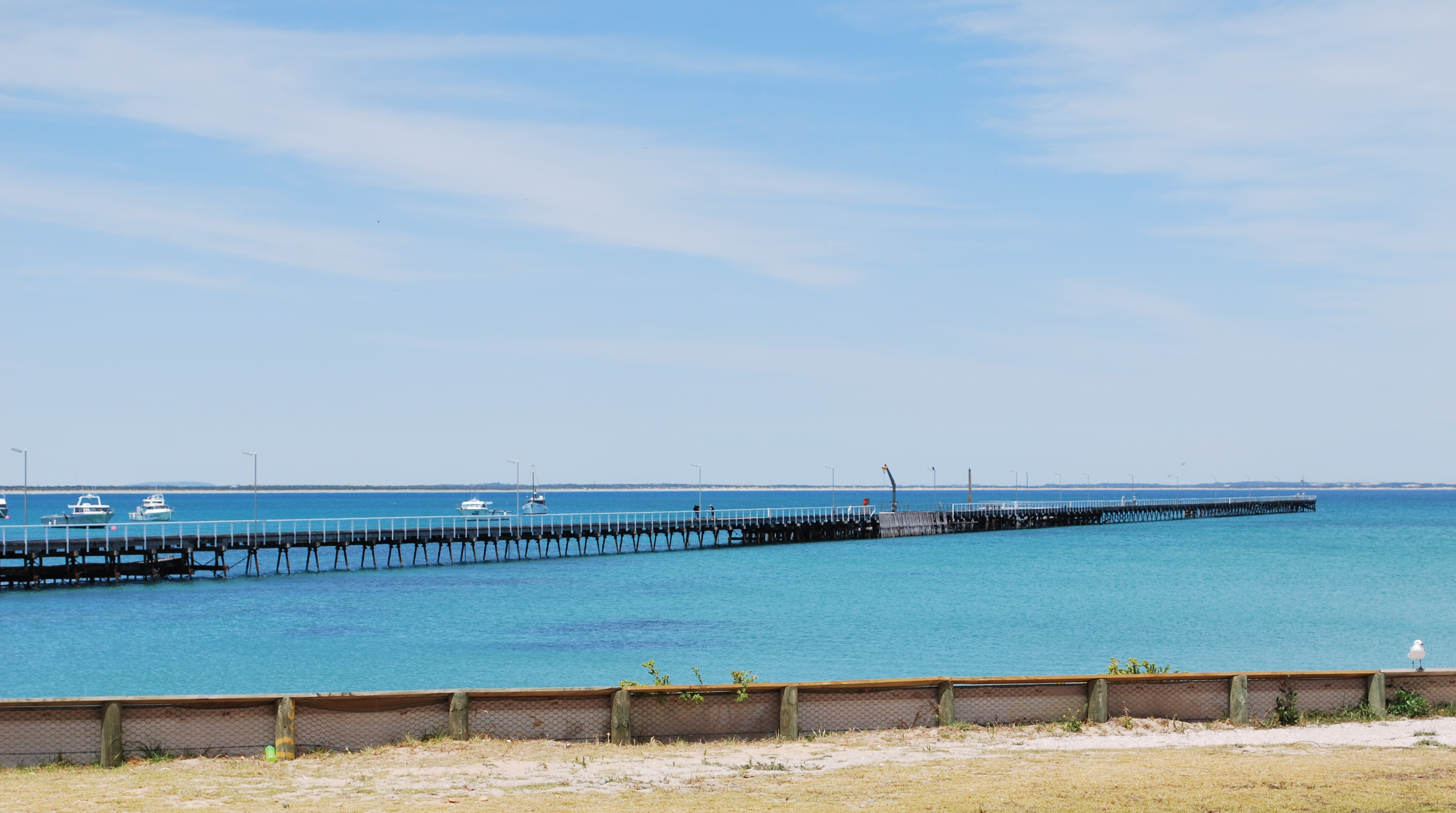
- 772 metres (2,533 ft) long jetty at Beachport

- Location in South Australia
- Location: Limestone Coast, South Australia
- Coordinates: 37°31′00″S 140°04′12″E
- Type: Bay
- Basin countries: Australia
- Max. length: 11.5 km (7.1 mi).
- Max. width: 4 km (2.5 mi)
- Max. depth: 16.5 m (54 ft)
- Islands: Penguin Island
- Settlements: Beachport; Southend

Rivoli Bay (French: Baie de Rivoli) is a bay located on the south-east coast of the Australian state of South Australia, about 311 kilometres (193 miles) south-southeast of the state capital of Adelaide and about 65 kilometres (40 miles) northwest by west of the regional centre of Mount Gambier. It was named in 1802 by the Baudin expedition of 1800–03 after André Masséna, the Duke of Rivoli and Marshal of France. It is one of four 'historic bays' located on the South Australian coast.

== Extent and description ==
Rivoli Bay lies between Glenns Point or Cape Martin at its northwestern extremity and Cape Buffon at its southeastern extremity, on the south-east coast of South Australia. The central part of the bay is described as "obstructed by numerous reefs, rocky patches, and shoals and is dangerous for navigation" and as having "a sandy beach". A small island named Penguin Island of 16 metres (52 feet) height is located immediately adjacent to Cape Martin.

Rivoli Bay is one of four bays on the South Australian coast considered by the Australian Government to be a "historic bay" under the Seas and Submerged Lands Act 1973 and was proclaimed as such in 1987 and again in 2006 and in 2016, with the result that the mouth of the bay is on the territorial seas baseline and the waters within the bay are internal waters as per the definition used in United Nations Convention on the Law of the Sea.

Navigation aids are located at both ends of the bay, with a lighthouse known as the Cape Martin Lighthouse on the north headland near Cape Martin and a light on the south headland at Cape Buffon.

== European discovery ==
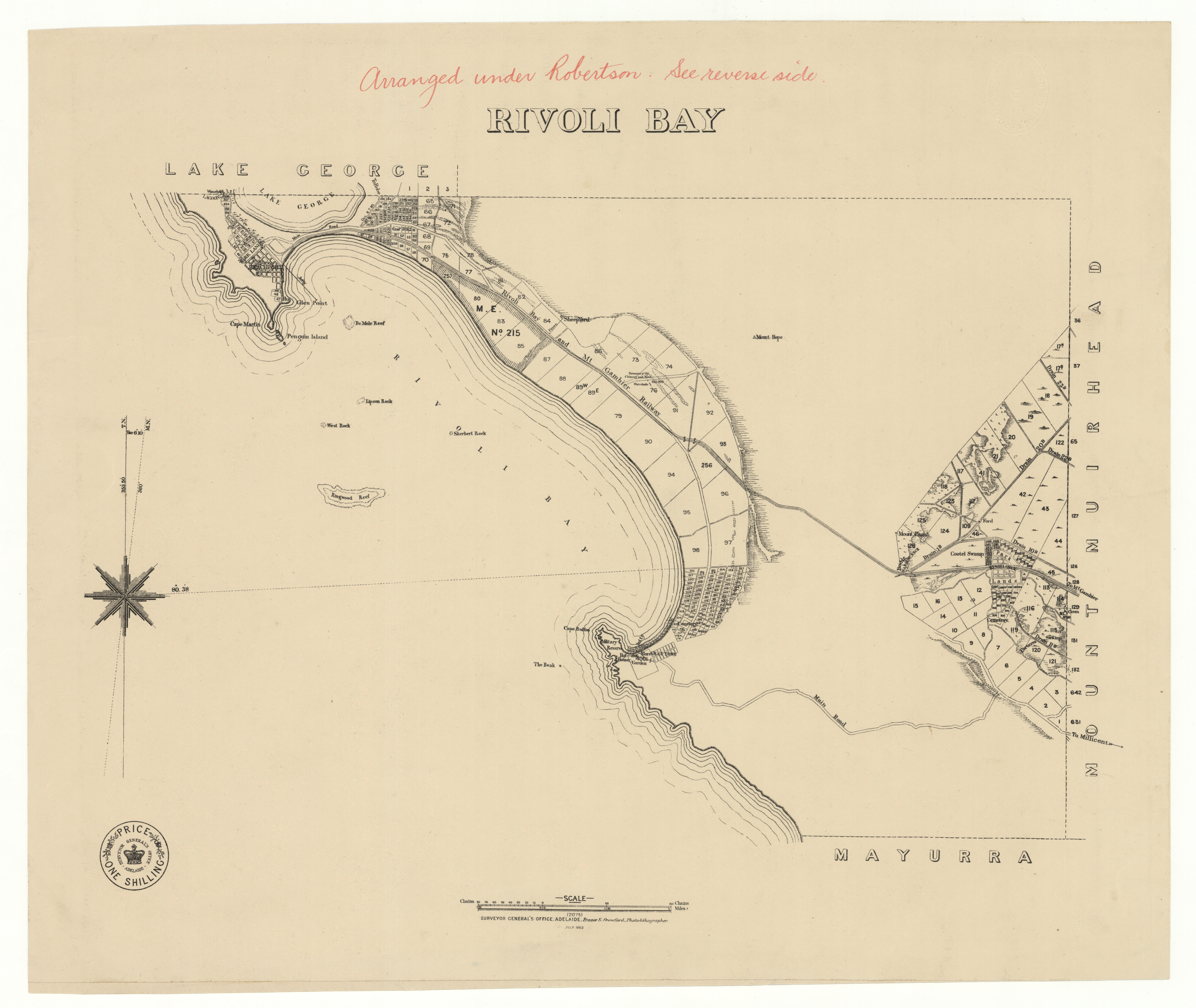
Map of Rivoli Bay, 1882

Rivoli Bay was named in 1802 by Peron and Freycinet of the Baudin expedition of 1800–03 after André Masséna, the Duke of Rivoli and Marshal of France.

A shore-based whaling station operated in Rivoli Bay from the late 1830s and into the 1840s. It was initially operated by William Dutton and the Henty family, who were associated with bay whaling at Portland Bay.

Australian sea lions were hunted in Rivoli Bay for their skins in the 1870s.

== Ports and other settlements ==
The following two settlements are located on its shores: Beachport and Southend. Both settlements have port infrastructure consisting of jetties.

== Protected areas ==
The following protected areas adjoin the bay's extent: the Canunda National Park and the Penguin Island Conservation Park.

== See also ==
- Rivoli (disambiguation)
- Penguin Island Lighthouse
