= Tetragonia moorei =

Scientific classification
- Kingdom: Plantae
- Clade: Tracheophytes
- Clade: Angiosperms
- Clade: Eudicots
- Order: Caryophyllales
- Family: Aizoaceae
- Genus: Tetragonia
- Species: T. moorei

Binomial name
- Tetragonia moorei M.Gray

Species of succulent

Tetragonia moorei is a member of the genus Tetragonia and is endemic to Australia.

The annual herb has a prostrate to erect habit that typically grows to a height of 3 to 30 centimetres (1.2 to 11.8 in). It blooms in August producing yellow-green flowers.

The plant has a scattered distribution throughout the Mid West and Goldfields-Esperance regions of Western Australia where it grows in sandy or clay soils.

The species was first formally described as Tetragonia tetragonoides by the botanist Kuntze in the work Revisio Generum Plantarum but had been misapplied. M. Gray reclassified it in 1997 in the article A new species of Tetragonia (Aizoaceae) from arid Australia in the journal Telopea.
