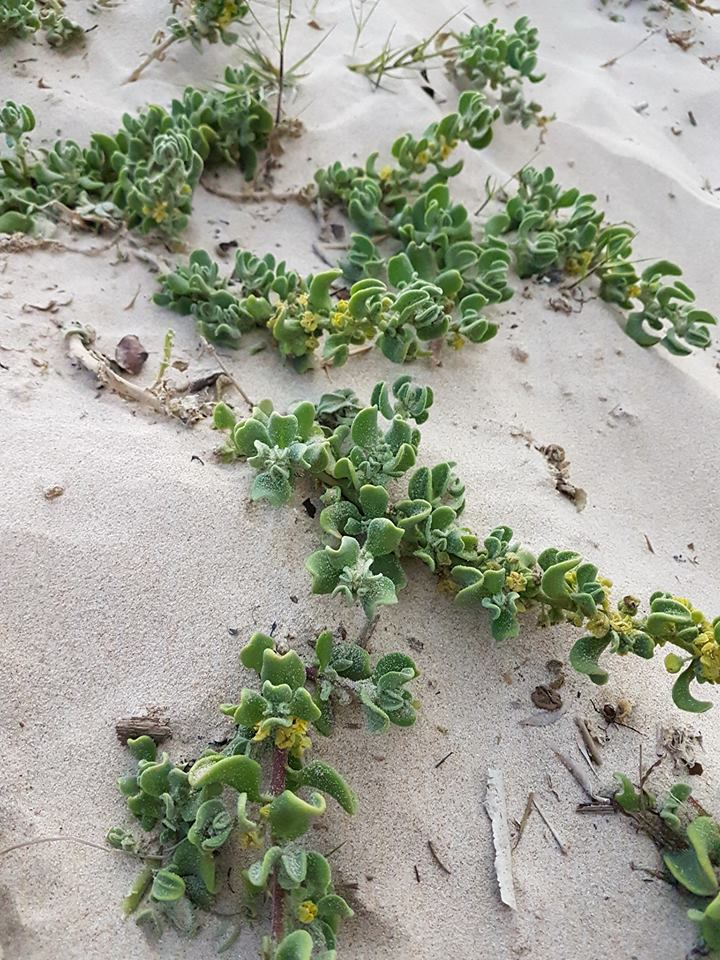

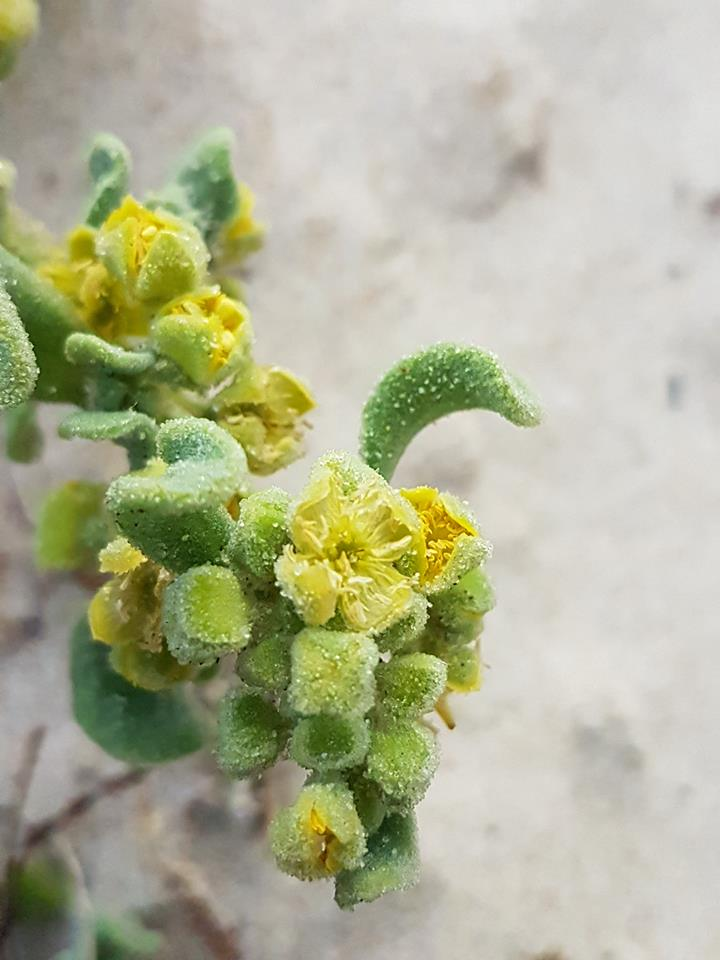

Scientific classification
- Kingdom: Plantae
- Clade: Tracheophytes
- Clade: Angiosperms
- Clade: Eudicots
- Order: Caryophyllales
- Family: Aizoaceae
- Genus: Tetragonia
- Species: T. decumbens

Binomial name
- Tetragonia decumbens Mill.

= Tetragonia decumbens =

Dune spinach

Species of succulent

Tetragonia decumbens (dune spinach or sea spinach) is a coastal shrub, native to southern Africa.

== Description ==
It grows as a trailing undershrub with thick, pale, furry stems, and thick, oval, saddle-shaped leaves 10-60 millimetres long and 5-30 millimetres wide. Flowers occur in clusters of three to five, and comprise four light yellow perianth segments surrounding a centre of many stamens. The fruit is succulent with four wings, whence the genus name 'Tetragonia' = four-angled.

== Taxonomy ==
It was first described and named by Philip Miller in 1768. In 1862 the name T. zeyheri was published by Eduard Fenzl, but this has since been determined to be a synonym of T. decumbens.

== Distribution and habitat ==
Native to southern Africa, it grows on coastal and estuarine sand dunes in Namibia and the Cape Provinces of South Africa. The plant is edible and is a local delicacy in its native southern Africa, where it is known as "dune spinach". It is an important component of dune vegetation, being a hardy pioneer and stabilising dunes. The organic material it produces prepares the way for ensuing plants.

It is naturalised in Australia, where it is known as "sea spinach", and occurs in Western Australia, South Australia and New South Wales. The New South Wales specimens were long misidentified as T. nigrescens. It was also formerly naturalised in Victoria, but it is now extinct there.
