= Tetragonia cristata =

Scientific classification
- Kingdom: Plantae
- Clade: Tracheophytes
- Clade: Angiosperms
- Clade: Eudicots
- Order: Caryophyllales
- Family: Aizoaceae
- Genus: Tetragonia
- Species: T. cristata

Binomial name
- Tetragonia cristata A.M.Prescott

Species of succulent

Tetragonia cristata is a member of the genus Tetragonia endemic to Australia.

The annual herb has a prostrate habit and typically grows to a height of 1.5 to 30 centimetres (0.6 to 11.8 in) and has stems up of 60 cm (24 in) in length. It blooms between July and September producing yellow flowers.

Often found on clay flats and amongst granite outcrops it has a scattered distribution throughout the Mid West region of Western Australia where it grows in sandy or clay soils.
