= Tetragonia diptera =

Scientific classification
- Kingdom: Plantae
- Clade: Tracheophytes
- Clade: Angiosperms
- Clade: Eudicots
- Order: Caryophyllales
- Family: Aizoaceae
- Genus: Tetragonia
- Species: T. diptera

Binomial name
- Tetragonia diptera F.Muell.

Species of succulent

Tetragonia diptera is a member of the genus Tetragonia and is endemic to Australia.

The annual or perennial herb has a prostrate to semi-erect habit that typically grows to a height of 5 to 10 centimetres (2.0 to 3.9 in). It blooms between July and August producing yellow-green flowers.

The plant is often found among limestone outcrops or on sand dunes and has a scattered distribution throughout the Gascoyne, Mid West and Wheatbelt regions of Western Australia where it grows in sandy or loamy soils.

The species was first formally described by the botanist Ferdinand von Mueller in 1878 in the work Fragmenta Phytographiae Australiae.
