= Rivoli (surname) =

Rivoli is a surname. Notable people with the surname include:

- Paulina Rivoli (1823–1881), Polish operatic soprano
- Pietra Rivoli (fl. 1943–2005), author and Georgetown University professor of finance and international business
