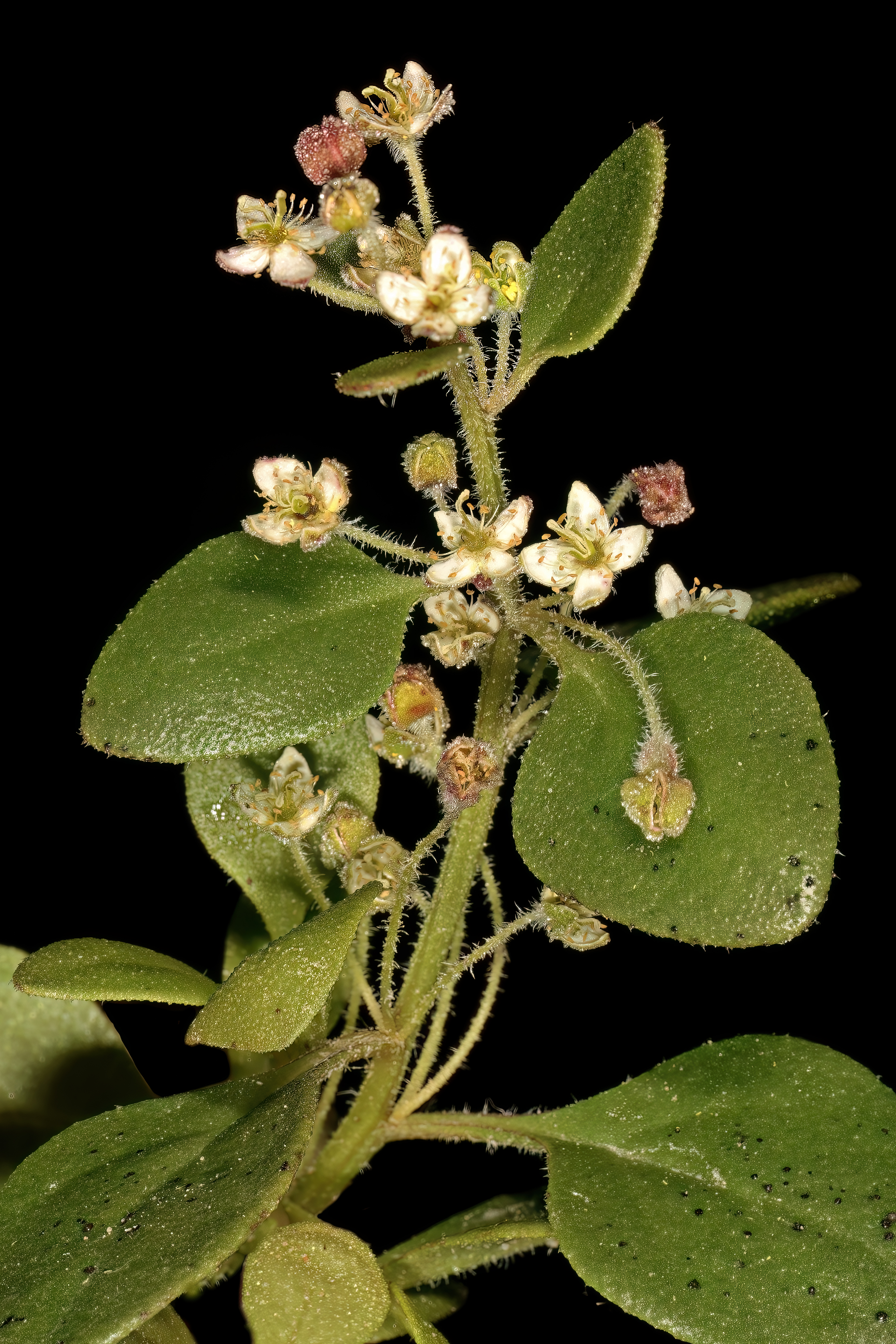
- In Darling, South Africa

Scientific classification
- Kingdom: Plantae
- Clade: Tracheophytes
- Clade: Angiosperms
- Clade: Eudicots
- Order: Caryophyllales
- Family: Aizoaceae
- Genus: Tetragonia
- Species: T. nigrescens

Binomial name
- Tetragonia nigrescens Eckl. & Zeyh.

= Tetragonia nigrescens =

Species of succulent

Tetragonia nigrescens is a plant native to southern Africa.

== Description ==
The prostrate herb blooms in September producing yellow flowers and grows well in sandy soils at lower altitudes.

A species that varies greatly in its inflorescence, leaf shape and hairiness. However, its flowers are typically axillary, and born in umbellate clusters (although these axillary umbels can sometimes instead grow as small branchlets with both flowers and tiny leaves).

The lower leaves are usually obtuse and when dried, the entire plant turns a very dark colour (almost black).

== Distribution ==
This species is indigenous to the far western edge of the Cape provinces, South Africa. It naturally occurs from Namaqualand in the north, southwards through Stellenbosch and Worcester, as far south as Struisbaai near Agulhas.

It has become naturalised in Western Australia in a coastal area around Perth.
