= Rivoli Theatre =

Rivoli Theatre or Rivoli Theater may refer to:

== Australia ==
- Rivoli Cinemas, a multiplex in Melbourne, Australia also known as Rivoli Theatre
- Rivoli Theatre, Naracoorte, South Australia, built 1935

== United States ==
- Rivoli Theater, former name of The Bessesen Building, Albert Lea, Minnesota, U.S.
- Rivoli Theater (Indianapolis, Indiana), U.S.
- Rivoli Theatre (South Fallsburg, New York), U.S.
- Rivoli Theatre, at 750 Seventh Avenue, a former movie theater in New York City
- Rivoli Theatre, former name of The Williams Center in Rutherford, New Jersey. The main performance hall is still officially named "Rivoli Theater"

== Other places ==
- Rivoli Theatre (Portugal), in Porto, Portugal

== See also ==
- Rivoli Cinema or Beirut VII, an archaeological site in Beirut
- The Rivoli bar and performance place in Toronto, where the Kids in the Hall honed their craft
