= Cape Martin Lighthouse =

Lighthouse in South Australia

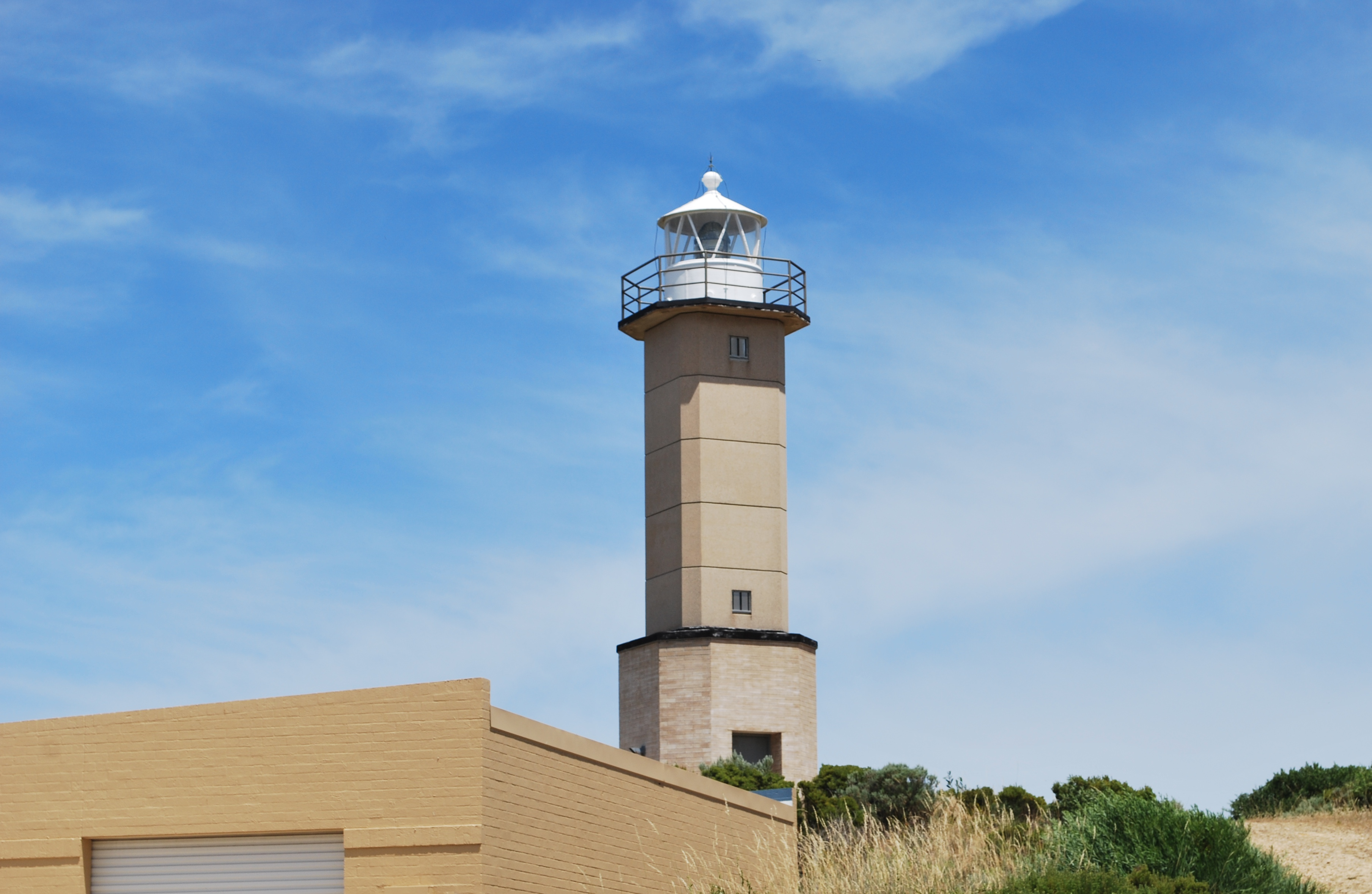
- Location: Cape Martin; Beachport; South Australia; Australia
- Coordinates: 37°29′22.8″S 140°00′45.5″E

Tower
- Constructed: 1960
- Construction: concrete tower
- Height: 12 metres (39 ft)
- Shape: square tower on a 1-story basement, balcony and lantern
- Markings: unpainted concrete and white lantern
- Power source: mains electricity
- Operator: Australian Maritime Safety Authority

Light
- First lit: 1960
- Focal height: 38 metres (125 ft)
- Intensity: 40,000 cd
- Range: 18 nautical miles (33 km; 21 mi)
- Characteristic: FI(4) W 20 s

Cape Martin Lighthouse is a lighthouse located on Cape Martin near Beachport at the north end of Rivoli Bay in South Australia. It was first lit in 1960. It replaced the Penguin Island Lighthouse whose light apparatus was reused in the new tower. The lighthouse was converted to mains power electricity in 1974. The original tower had a height of 4.5 metres (15 feet). However, the gradual build up of sand dunes obscured the light. This problem was rectified in 1980 when the tower was raised to a height of 12 metres (39 feet).

== See also ==
- List of lighthouses in Australia
