= Penguin Island Lighthouse =

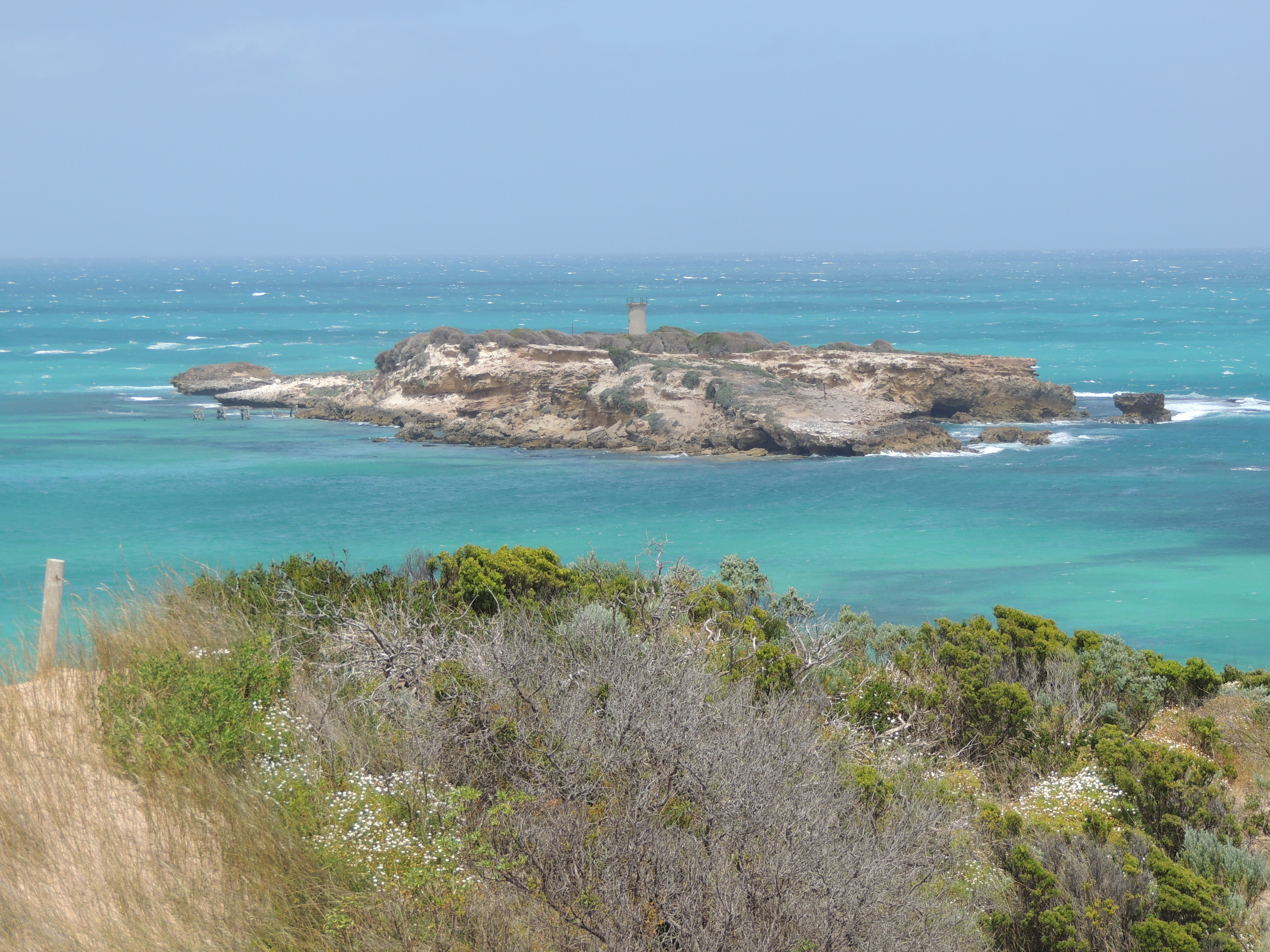
- Penguin Island including abandoned lighthouse tower as viewed from Cape Martin, South Australia
- Location: Penguin Island; South Australia; Australia
- Coordinates: 37°29′52.8″S 140°0′49.4″E

Tower
- Construction: stone tower
- Automated: 1918
- Height: 10.8 metres (35 ft)
- Shape: cylindrical tower, lantern removed
- Operator: Australian Maritime Safety Authority

Light
- First lit: 1878
- Deactivated: 1960
- Focal height: 24 metres (79 ft)
- Light source: acetylene
- Intensity: 30,000 cd
- Range: 11 nautical miles (20 km; 13 mi)
- Characteristic: FI (4) W 12s.

Penguin Island Lighthouse was a lighthouse located on Penguin Island at the north end of Rivoli Bay in South Australia.

It was first lit on 1 October 1878. In 1960, the lighthouse was decommissioned to allow the transfer of the light's apparatus to a new lighthouse on Cape Martin to the immediate north. In 1904, John Hendry, head keeper of the lighthouse, was lost at sea and presumed drowned.

== See also ==
- List of lighthouses in Australia
