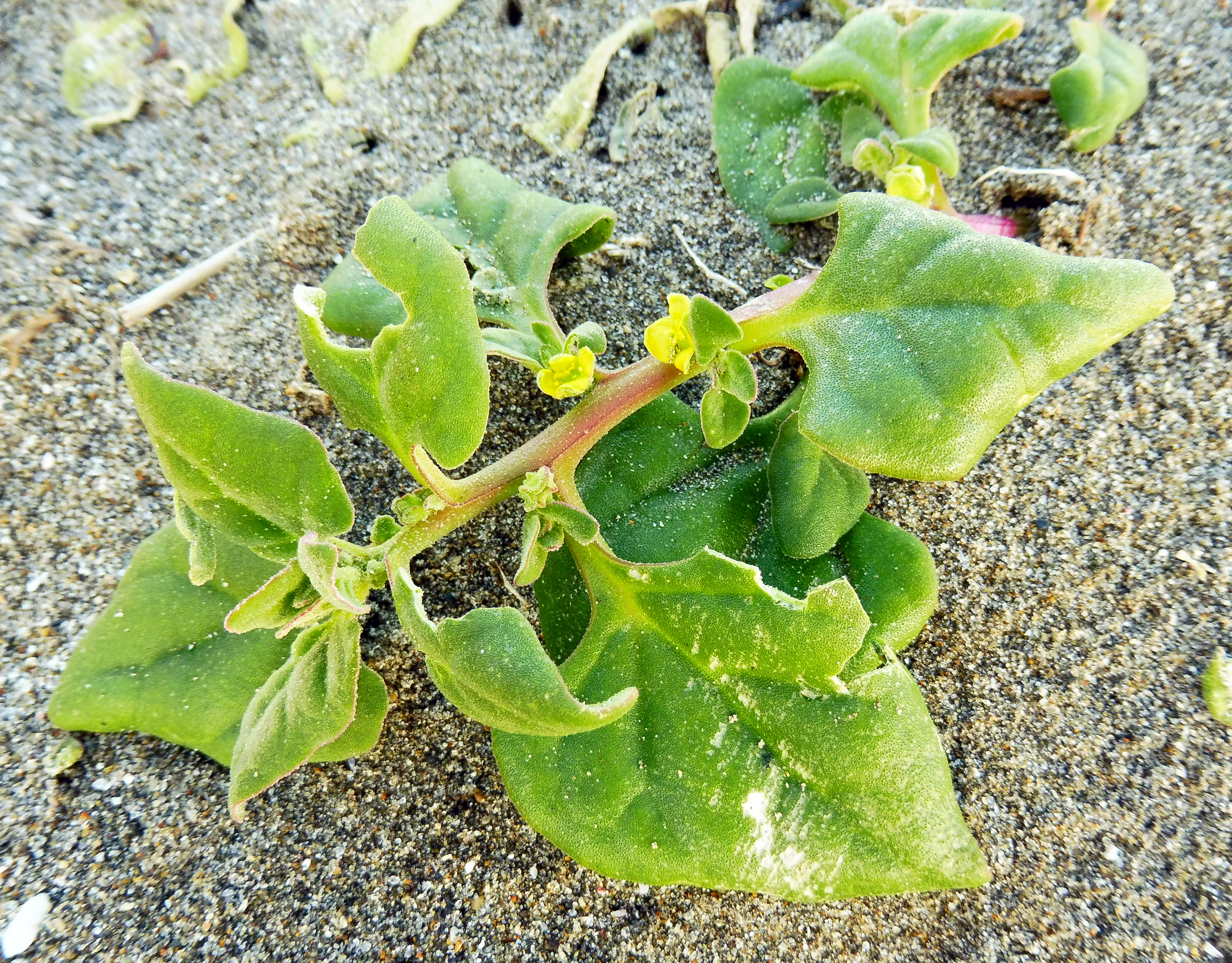
- Tetragonia tetragonioides, growing in sand in its native habitat in Japan

Scientific classification
- Kingdom: Plantae
- Clade: Tracheophytes
- Clade: Angiosperms
- Clade: Eudicots
- Order: Caryophyllales
- Family: Aizoaceae
- Genus: Tetragonia
- Species: T. tetragonioides

Binomial name
- Tetragonia tetragonioides (Pall.) Kuntze

Synonyms
- Tetragonia expansa

= Tetragonia tetragonioides =

Species of plant

Tetragonia tetragonioides, commonly called New Zealand spinach, warrigal greens or by its Māori name of Kōkihi, is a flowering plant in the fig-marigold family (Aizoaceae). It is often cultivated as a leafy vegetable.

It is a widespread species, native to eastern Asia, Australia, and New Zealand. It has been introduced and is an invasive species in many parts of Africa, Europe, North America, and South America. Its natural habitat is sandy shorelines and bluffs, often in disturbed areas. It is a halophyte and grows well in saline ground.

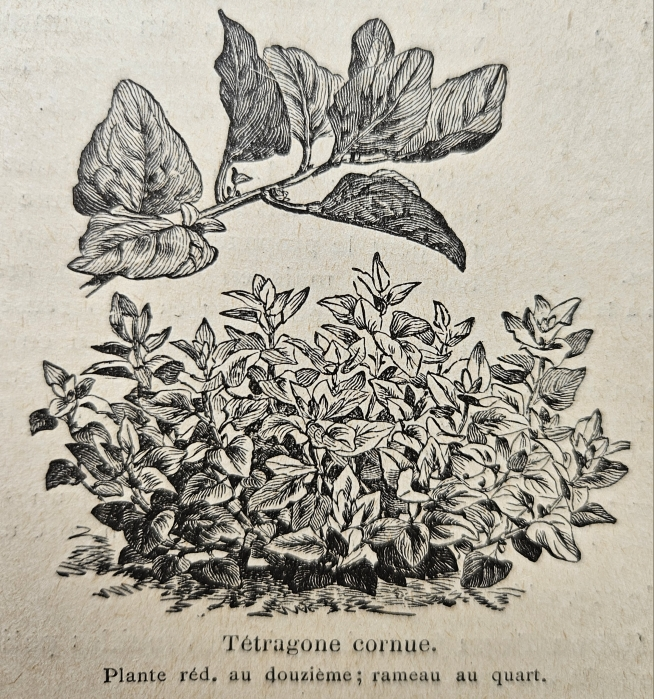
Tétragone cornue in "Les plantes potagères" Vilmorin 1925

== Description ==
The plant has a trailing habit, and will form a thick carpet on the ground or climb through other vegetation and hang downwards. It can have erect growth when young. The leaves of the plant are 3–15 cm (1.2–5.9 in) long, triangular in shape, and bright green. The leaves are thick, and covered with tiny papillae that look like waterdrops on the top and bottom of the leaves. The flowers of the plant are yellow, and the fruit are small, hard capsules each with 4–10 horned seeds.

Sphaeraphides are found in at least the leaves, calyx and ovary.

== Taxonomy ==
Prussian naturalist Peter Pallas described the species as Demidovia tetragonoides in 1781. German botanist Otto Kuntze placed the species in the genus Tetragonia in his 1891 work Revisio Generum Plantarum, resulting in its current binomial name.

This widely distributed plant has many common names, depending on its location. In addition to the name New Zealand spinach, it is also known as Botany Bay spinach, Cook's cabbage, kōkihi (in Māori), sea spinach, and tetragon. Its Australian names of Warrigal Greens and Warrigal Cabbage come from the local use of warrigal to describe plants that are wild (not farmed originally).

== Cultivation ==
It is grown for the edible leaves, and can be used as food or an ornamental plant for ground cover. It can be an annual or perennial. As some of its names signify, it has similar flavour and texture properties to spinach, and is cooked like spinach. Like spinach, it contains oxalates; its medium to low levels of oxalates need to be removed by blanching the leaves in hot water for one minute, then rinsing in cold water before cooking. It thrives in hot weather, and is considered an heirloom vegetable. Few insects consume it, and even slugs and snails do not seem to feed on it.

The thick, irregularly-shaped seeds should be planted just after the last spring frost. Before planting, the seeds should be soaked for 12 hours in cold water, or 3 hours in warm water. Seeds should be planted 5–10 mm (0.2–0.4 in) deep, and spaced 15–30 cm (5.9–11.8 in) apart. The seedlings will emerge in 10–20 days, and it will continue to produce greens through the summer. Mature plant will self-seed. Seeds will overwinter up to USDA zone 5.

New Zealand spinach, cooked, boiled, drained, without salt
Nutritional value per 100 g (3.5 oz)
- Energy: 51 kJ (12 kcal)
- Carbohydrates: 2.13 g
- Sugars: 0.25 g
- Dietary fiber: 1.4 g
- Fat: 0.17 g
- Protein: 1.3 g
Vitamins and minerals
Vitamins	Quantity %DV^{†}
Vitamin A	3622 IU
Thiamine (B1)	3% 0.03 mg
Riboflavin (B2)	8% 0.107 mg
Niacin (B3)	2% 0.39 mg
Pantothenic acid (B5)	5% 0.256 mg
Vitamin B6	14% 0.237 mg
Vitamin C	18% 16 mg
Vitamin E	8% 1.23 mg
Vitamin K	243% 292 μg
Minerals	Quantity %DV^{†}
Calcium	4% 48 mg
Iron	4% 0.66 mg
Magnesium	8% 32 mg
Manganese	23% 0.526 mg
Phosphorus	2% 22 mg
Potassium	3% 102 mg
Sodium	5% 107 mg
Zinc	3% 0.31 mg
- Other constituents: Quantity
- Water: 94.8 g
- Link to USDA Database entry
- ^{†}Percentages estimated using US recommendations for adults, except for potassium, which is estimated based on expert recommendation from the National Academies.

== As food ==
The species, rarely used by indigenous people as a leaf vegetable, was first documented by Captain Cook. It was immediately picked, cooked, and pickled to help fight scurvy, and taken with the crew of the Endeavour. It spread when the explorer and botanist Joseph Banks took seeds back to Kew Gardens during the latter half of the 18th century. For two centuries, T. tetragonioides was the only cultivated vegetable to have originated from Australia and New Zealand.

There are some indications that Māori did eat kōkihi perhaps more regularly. According to Murdoch Riley, "to counteract the bitterness of the older leaves of this herb, the Māori boiled it with the roots of the convolvulus (pōhue)", in reference to species of Convolvulaceae now classified as Calystegia. The tips of the spinach can be pinched off and eaten raw or cooked.

== Nutrition ==
When consumed after boiling, New Zealand spinach is 95% water, 2% carbohydrates, 1% protein, and contains negligible fat (table). In a reference amount of 100 g (3.5 oz), the spinach supplies 12 calories and is particularly rich in vitamin K, providing 243% of the Daily Value (DV). It also contains appreciable amounts of vitamin B_{6}, vitamin C, and manganese (14–23% DV) (table).

== Gallery ==
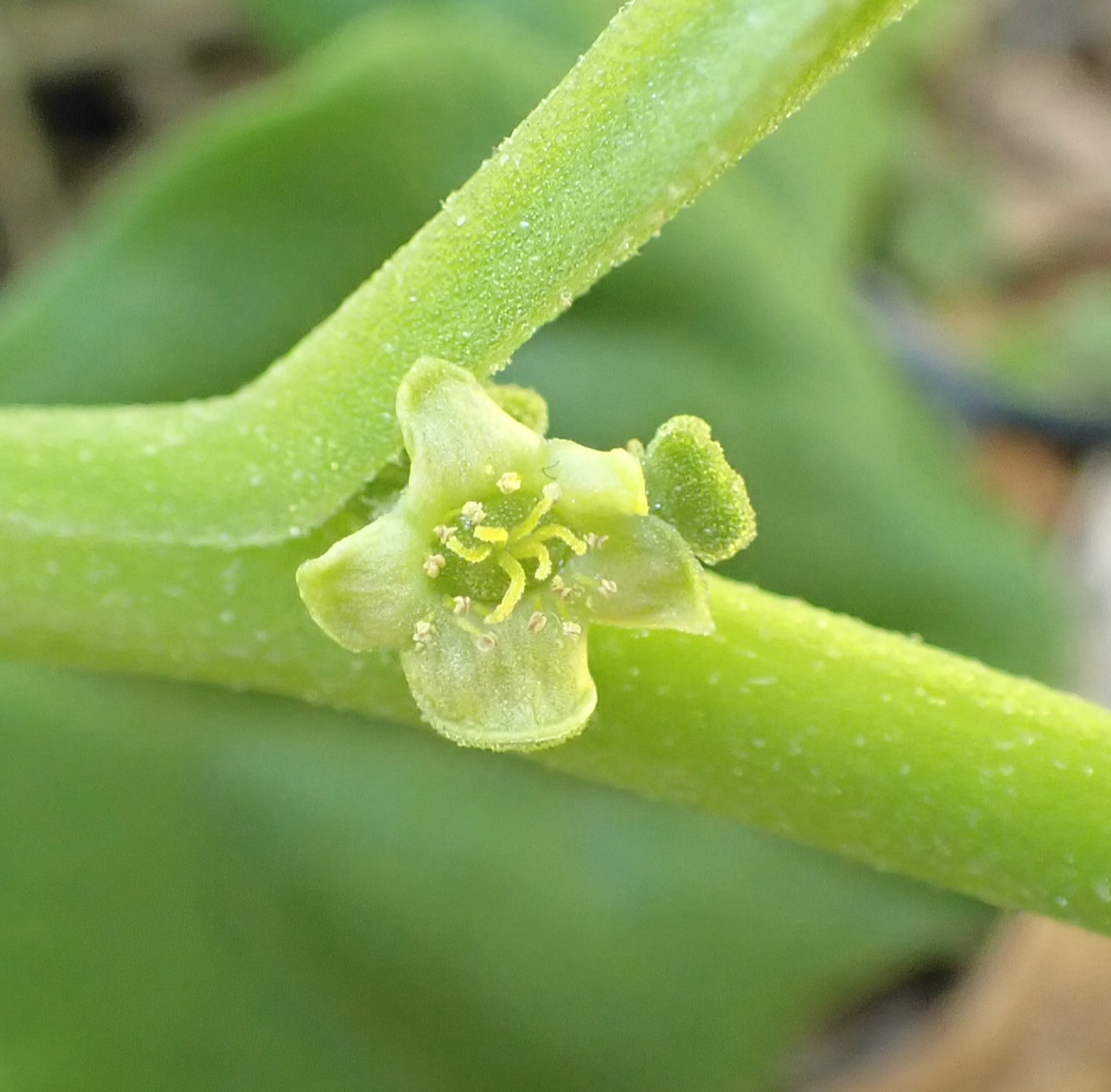
Flower

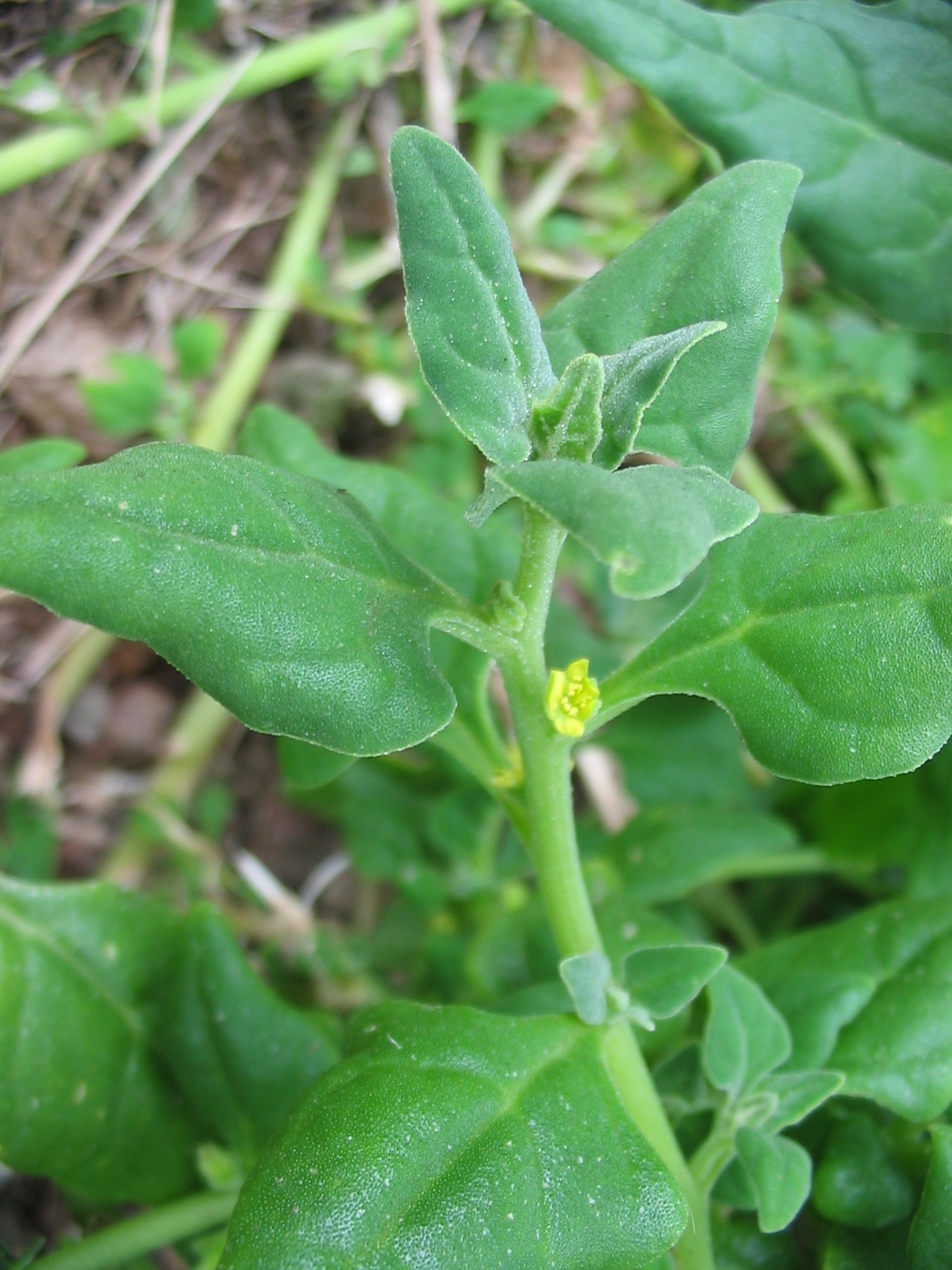
T. tetragonioides showing erect growth

== Bibliography ==
- Gulliver, George (1864). "Observations on Raphides and other Crystals". The Annals and Magazine of Natural History, Including Zoology, Botany, and Geology. Third Series. 14: 250–252.
