= Glass House Mountains National Park =

- IUCN category II (national park)
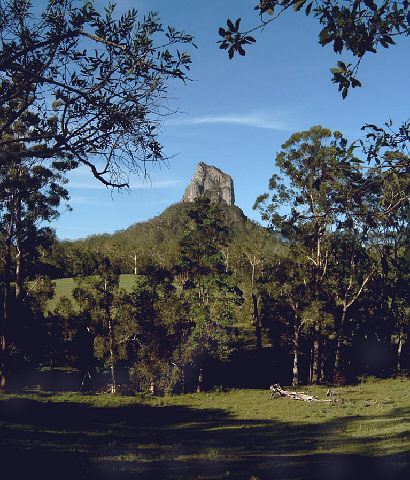
- Mount Coonowrin, Glass House Mountains

- Location within Queensland
- Location: Queensland
- Nearest city: Brisbane
- Coordinates: 26°50′51″S 152°57′15″E
- Established: 1994
- Governing body: Queensland Parks and Wildlife Service
- Website: Official website

Glass House Mountains National Park
- Location within Queensland
- 26.93°S 152.9172°E
- Location: Glass House Mountains, Sunshine Coast Region, Queensland, Australia

Queensland Heritage Register
- Official name: Glass House Mountains National Park and Beerburrum Forest Reserve 1
- Type: state heritage (landscape)
- Designated: 3 May 2007
- Reference no.: 602494
- Significant period: early Tertiary Period – present

Glass House Mountains National Park is a heritage-listed national park at Glass House Mountains, Sunshine Coast Region, Queensland, Australia. It is also known as Beerburrum Forest Reserve 1. It is 70 km (43 mi) north of Brisbane and consists of a flat plain punctuated by rhyolite and trachyte volcanic plugs, the cores of extinct volcanoes that formed 26 million to 27 million years ago. The mountains would once have had pyroclastic exteriors, but these have eroded away.

The national park was established in 1994. On 23 June 2010 the Queensland Government announced the expansion of the park to include an additional 2,117 hectares (5,230 acres). It was added to the Queensland Heritage Register on 3 May 2007.

== Facilities ==
Camp grounds are available at Glass House Mountains township and Coochin Creek, west of Beerwah. Lookouts have been built at several of the summits. Walking tracks allow access to the summits of Mount Beerwah, Mount Tibrogargan and Mount Ngungun. Access is via the Steve Irwin Way exit from the Bruce Highway.

== History ==
The Glass House Mountains are one of southeast Queensland's most impressive landmarks. They are situated 65–75 kilometres (40–47 mi) north of Brisbane and are a group of steep sided plugs of trachyte and rhyolite, once within volcanoes active in the early Tertiary Period. They have been exposed by wind and water erosion of the softer material of the cones and surrounding area and now rise dramatically from the flat coastal plain.

The mountains are central to the creation myths of the region and their spiritual and social importance and links to Indigenous people continues to this day.

The first European description of the Glass House Mountains was by Lieutenant (later Captain) James Cook, when he sailed north up the east coast of Australia on his voyage of discovery in the ship HM Bark Endeavour in 1770. The shape of the mountains reminded him of the huge glass furnaces (glasshouses) back in his native Yorkshire and he named them accordingly. In his log for 17 May 1770 he wrote:

this place may always be found by three hills which lay to the northward of it in the latitude of 26 degrees 53 minutes south. These hills lay but a little way inland and not far from each other; they are very remarkable on account of their singular form of elevation which very much resembles glass houses which occasioned me giving them that name: the northernmost of the three is the highest and largest. There are likewise several other peaked hills inland to the northward of these but they are not nearly so remarkable.

Nearly thirty years later, Lieutenant (later Captain) Matthew Flinders sailed up the coast in the sloop Norfolk. In his report to the Governor of New South Wales, Captain John Hunter, dated 14 July 1799 he wrote:

At dusk Cape Moreton bore west two or three miles, and the highest glass house, whose peak was just topping over the distant land, had opened around it at 3 degrees west or 4 degrees north. Two Haycock like hummocks distinct from any other land opened soon after a few degrees to the southward.

On 26 July Flinders took two sailors and the Aborigine Bungaree and landed on the shore with the intention of climbing Mount Tibrogargan. They climbed Mount Beerburrum before setting off for Tibrogargan, which they reached the next day, but which they did not climb.

On 29 November 1823 John Oxley entered observations of the Glass Houses in his field book. Allan Cunningham also mentioned them in his report of 15 July 1829.

In 1839–42 Andrew Petrie and Stephen Simpson explored the Glasshouse Mountains and in 1848 Andrew and John Petrie climbed Beerwah and left a note in a bottle at the summit. Petrie and naturalist Dr Ludwig Leichhardt visited the area in 1843 and 1844 and made geological and botanical observations.

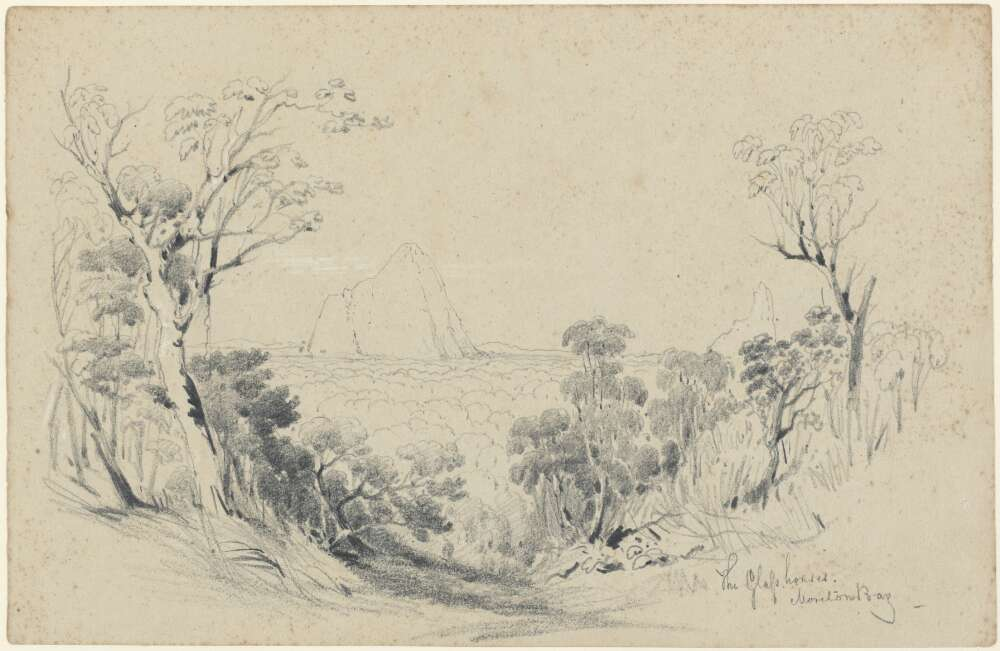
"The Glass Houses, Moreton Bay" by Conrad Martens, 1850

The Glass House Mountains have been an inspiration for artists since they were first described by Cook, including the painting by Conrad Martens' Glasshouse Mountains, Moreton Bay. Numerous poems have been written about them and they have been the subjects of writings such as the short story, The Mountains Played, by Judith Wright.

The mountains have also been a popular subject for both amateur and professional photographers from the early years of photography to the present day. Recent musical works such as Robert Davidson's Tibrogargan and John Gilfedder's work Legend of the Tibrogargan testify to the continuing appeal of the mountains.

The proximity of the peaks to several large coastal population centres makes them destinations for tourists who participate in bushwalking, climbing and take-in the views from the mountains.

The Glass House Mountains provide islands of natural habitat for plants and animals. They conserve regionally significant areas of rhyolitic mountain vegetation that supports 26 plants that are rare, threatened or of conservation interest. The ridges, rocky pavements, scree slopes and gullies provide a variety of habitats for vegetation ranging from Eucalypt open forest to montane heaths and shrublands. The mountains also provide a habitat for many species of fauna, some of which are rare or endangered. The area now known as the Glass House Mountains National Park was first gazetted in 1954. Gazetted areas incorporated smaller parks such as Beerwah, Coonowrin, Ngungun and Tibrogargan. These smaller parks were amalgamated into the Glass House Mountains National Park in 1994.

== Description ==
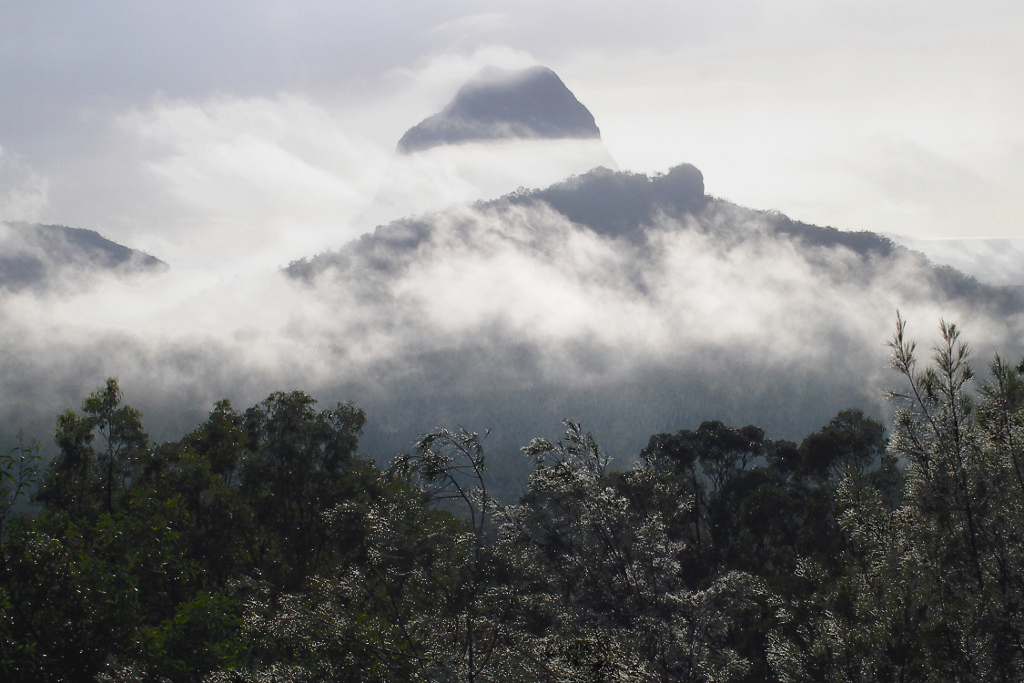
Early morning fog

The Glass House Mountains are a group of dome shaped hills and conical peaks rising sharply above the surrounding sub-coastal lowlands. They are the remnants of rhyolite and trachyte volcanic plugs and are located in southeast Queensland 65–75 kilometres (40–47 mi) north of Brisbane and west of the townships of Glass House Mountains and Beerburrum.

Glass House Mountains National Park and Beerburrum Forest Reserve 1 covers eleven of the 16 Glass House Mountains and a small parcel of land known as Blue Gum Creek. The park is in eight sections ranging in size from 11 to 291 hectares (27 to 719 acres) and in total cover an area of approximately 883 hectares (2,180 acres).

Mount Tibrogargan (364 metres (1,194 ft)) and Mount Cooee (106 metres (348 ft)) are composed of alkali rhyolite. Mount Cooee has caves and there are the remains of an old trigonometry station at the summit. It is a habitat for the peregrine falcon (Falco peregrinus). Mount Tibrogargan is the third highest and is open for the public to climb.

Mount Beerwah (556 metres (1,824 ft)) is composed of alkali trachyte. Near the top, there are large hexagonal cooling columns on its north side (the Organ Pipes). The mountain also has early timber trails and timber getters' campsites on the eastern side. It has caves and is also a peregrine falcon habitat. Mount Beerwah is the highest peak within the park; however public access to the "tourist track" in the National Park has been restricted since 2009.

Mount Ngungun (253 metres (830 ft)) is composed of alkali rhyolite. This mountain also has good examples of vertical columnar jointing and has caves. There is evidence of early 1950s quarrying activities.

Mount Coonowrin (Crookneck) (377 metres (1,237 ft)) is composed of alkali rhyolite. It has good examples of vertical columnar jointing and has caves. Timber and steel pitons left by climbers can be found, though the mountain is now closed to climbers. It is a habitat for the peregrine falcon. Mount Coonowrin is the second highest; however, public access to it has been prohibited since 1999 due to the danger of trachyte rock stability.

Mount Elimbah (109 metres (358 ft)) is locally called Saddleback because of the saddle like dip between the peaks. It is composed of alkali rhyolite and right-angled trenches used for World War Two infantry training can be seen on the lower slopes

Blue Gum Creek is an area of about 11 hectares (27 acres). It supports populations of the endangered swamp stringbark Eucalyptus conglomerata. It is an isolated species habitat for several vulnerable species of frogs including wallum froglet Crinia tinnula, wallum sedge frog Litoria olongburensis and Freycinet's frog Litoria freycineti and the rare green thighed frog Litoria brevipalmata.

Mount Miketeebumulgrai (202 metres (663 ft)) is composed of porphyritic trachyte and provides feeding and nesting places for the black cockatoo (Calyptorhynchus lathami) and the rare grey goshawk (Accipiter novaehollandiae).

Mount Coochin, (as known as Coochin Hills) - west hill 235 metres (771 ft), east hill 230 metres (750 ft), is composed of alkali rhyolite and supports an area of the endangered plant species Leucopogon recurvisepalus.

Mount Beerburrum (278 metres (912 ft)) is composed of porphyritic trachyte. The mountain has complex rainforest, with some endangered plant species such as Tindal's stringybark (Eucalyptus tindaliae), Pink bloodwood (Corymbia intermedia) and Smooth-barked apple (Angophora leiocarpa). Scribbly gum (Eucalyptus racemosa) is locally predominant in places, with the largest tract retained on Mount Beerburrum. The mountain has a forestry fire tower with a viewing platform at the summit.

Mount Tunbubudla, also known as the Twins (west twin 294 metres (965 ft), east twin 338 metres (1,109 ft)), is composed of alkali rhyolite. The majority of the mountain is covered in dry sclerophyll forest. There are also areas of exposed rock dominated by the rare Bronze-barked Tea Tree (Leptospermum luehmannii), a plant restricted to the Glasshouse Mountains.

Mount Tibberoowuccum (220 metres (720 ft)) is composed of alkali rhyolite. The mountain is a dome-shaped rock surrounded by eucalypt open forest, as well as complex rainforest, although the area is not extensive. There is a small population of Narrow-leaf bitter-pea (Daviesia Mimosoides) present on the southern slope of the mountain. This shrub is widespread in Victoria and New South Wales, but rare in Queensland, and the Mount Tiberoocwuccum population is the most northerly known.

Other peaks include:

- Round Mountain
- Wild Horse Mountain, 123 metres (404 ft)

=== Flora ===
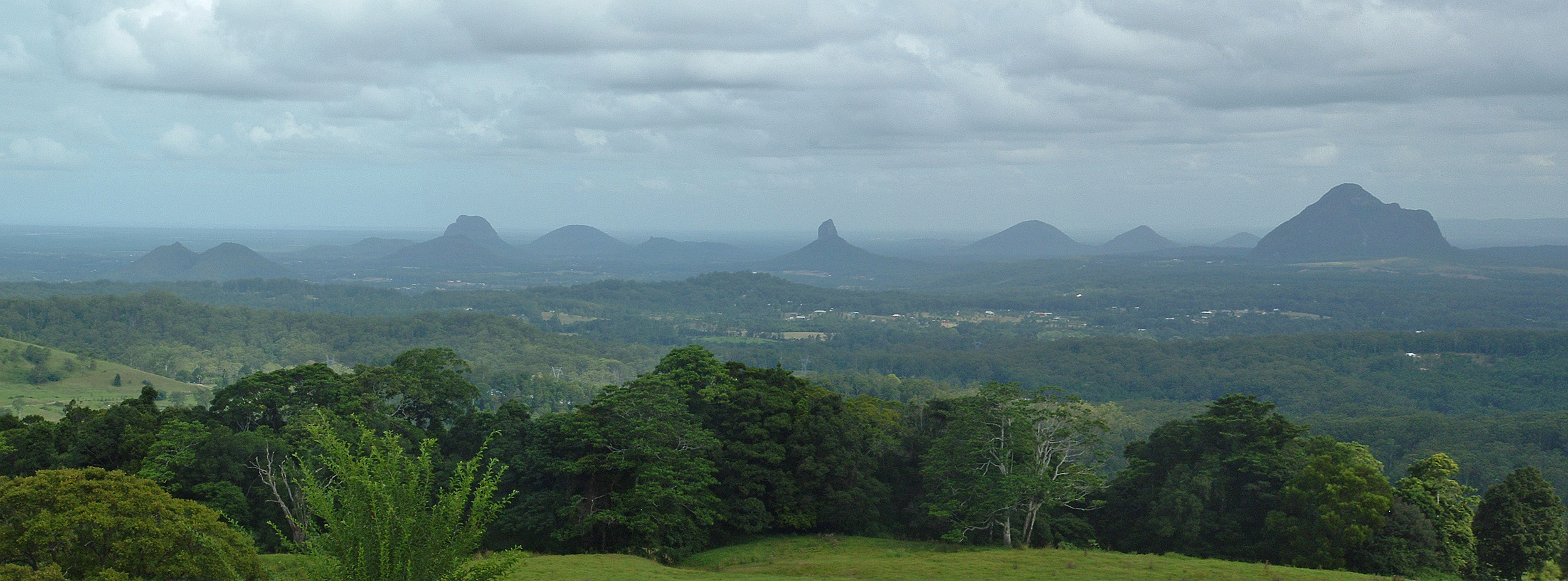
Glass House Mountains viewed from Mary Cairncross Reserve

The peaks support a diverse range of habitats including montane heath and shrubland, open forest and woodlands and small rainforest patches on some peaks.The montane heath is particularly rich in threatened and endemic species many of which can be found nowhere else. In total there are 26 species of rare vegetation on the heaths. The Glasshouse Mountains Tea Tree (Leptospermum leuhmanii) is restricted to the peaks and is notable for its beautiful smooth orange bark. The Mount Beerwah Mallee Red Gum (Eucalyptus kabiana) is also endemic and is named after the local Aboriginal Tribe and traditional owners the Kabi Kabi (pronounced Gubbi Gubbi). Other endemic plants include Gonocarpus effusus, Grevillea hodgei, Westringia grandifolia and Leptospermum oreophyllum.

== Heritage listing ==
Glass House Mountains National Park and Beerburrum Forest Reserve 1 was listed on the Queensland Heritage Register on 3 May 2007 having satisfied the following criteria.

The place is important in demonstrating the evolution or pattern of Queensland's history.

The Glass House Mountains as ancient landforms illustrate the evolution of the landscape and the geological history of volcanic activity in the area. Because of their size and distinctive form they are readily identifiable from a number of distant observation points from both land and sea and so have played an important role in navigation in connection with the European exploration of the east coast of Australia. Captain Cook sighted and named them in 1770. In 1799 Matthew Flinders also reported on the Glass House peaks and camped in the area. Other early explorers connected with them are John Oxley, Alan Cunningham, Andrew Petrie and Ludwig Leichhardt.

The place is important because of its aesthetic significance.

The Glass House peaks are visually impressive, rising dramatically from a flat coastal plain and are landmarks that can be seen from as far away as the Scenic Rim on the Queensland and New South border and out to sea. Views of the mountains, and obtained from the mountains, are of high aesthetic value and have inspired countless paintings and photographs. Their majestic and eerie beauty continues to attract large numbers of visitors to the national park areas that contain them.

The place has a special association with the life or work of a particular person, group or organisation of importance in Queensland's history.

The Glass House peaks are central to the creation myths of the region and have a high degree of cultural significance to Indigenous people.

The wider community also values the mountains as recreational venues and their closeness to Brisbane and major centres on the Sunshine Coast have made them readily accessible to day-trippers. The peaks have for many years been popular destinations for people wanting to bushwalk, picnic and to enjoy the volcanic scenery.

== See also ==
- Protected areas of Queensland
