= Volcanic plug =

Volcanic object created when magma hardens within a vent on an active volcano

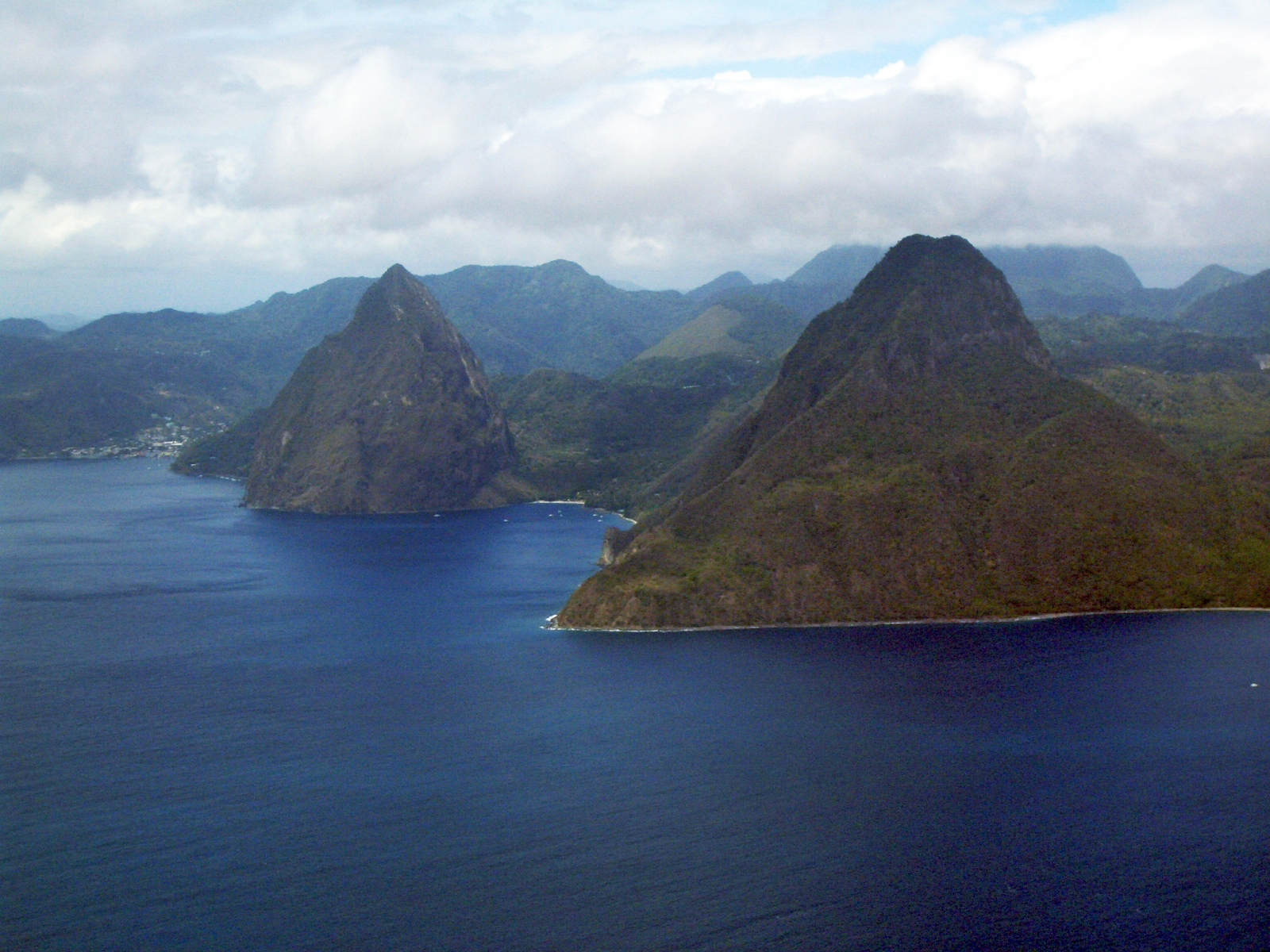
An aerial view of the Gros Piton and Petit Piton, in St. Lucia, 2006.

A volcanic plug, also called a volcanic neck or lava neck, is a volcanic object created when magma hardens within a vent on an active volcano. When present, a plug can cause an extreme build-up of high gas pressure if rising volatile-charged magma is trapped beneath it, and this can sometimes lead to an explosive eruption. In a plinian eruption the plug is destroyed and ash is ejected.

Glacial erosion can lead to exposure of the plug on one side, while a long slope of material remains on the opposite side. Such landforms are called crag and tail. If a volcanic plug is later covered by softer, looser layers of tephra, such as ash and hydrothermally altered lava, then agents of erosion may in time remove that softer surrounding rock while the plug's harder, less erodible congealed magma remains, producing a distinctive upstanding, necklike landform.

== Examples of volcanic plugs ==
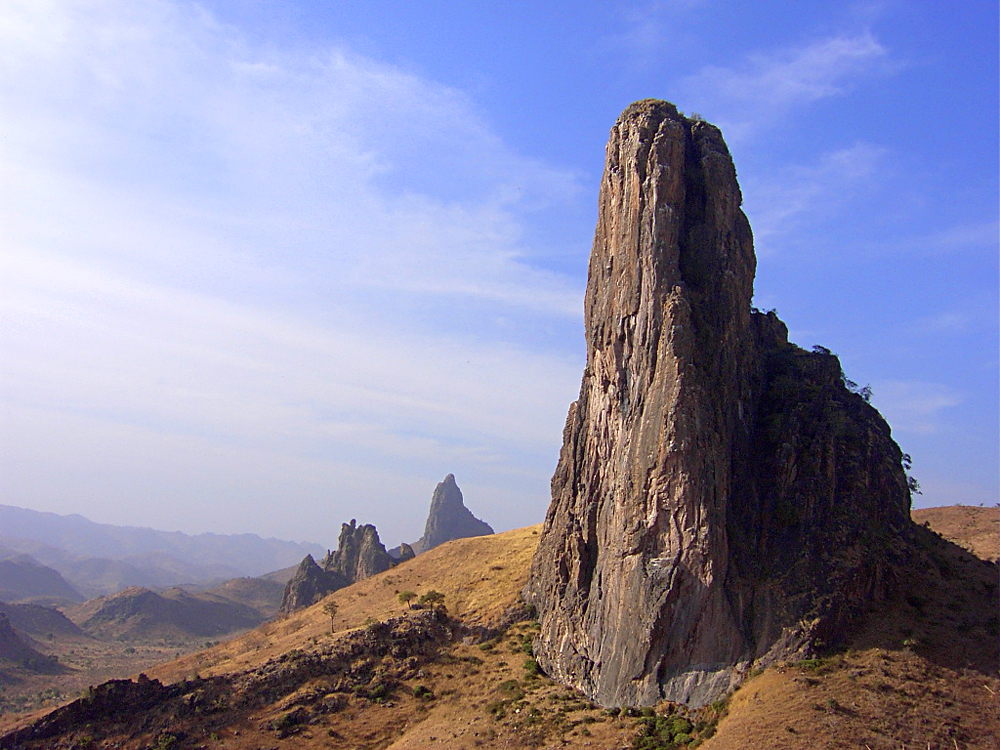
Volcanic plug near Rhumsiki, Cameroon.

=== Africa ===
Near the village of Rhumsiki in the Far North Province of Cameroon, Kapsiki Peak is an example of a volcanic plug and is one of the most photographed parts of the Mandara Mountains. Spectacular volcanic plugs are present in the center of La Gomera island in the Canary Islands archipelago, within the Garajonay National Park. The Pico Cão Grande (Portuguese for "Great Dog Peak") is a landmark needle-shaped volcanic plug peak in São Tomé and Príncipe, in the Caué District of São Tomé Island in Parque Natural Obô de São Tomé. Its summit is 663 m (2,175 ft) above sea level,[1] and it rises about 370 m (1,210 ft) over the surrounding terrain.[2]

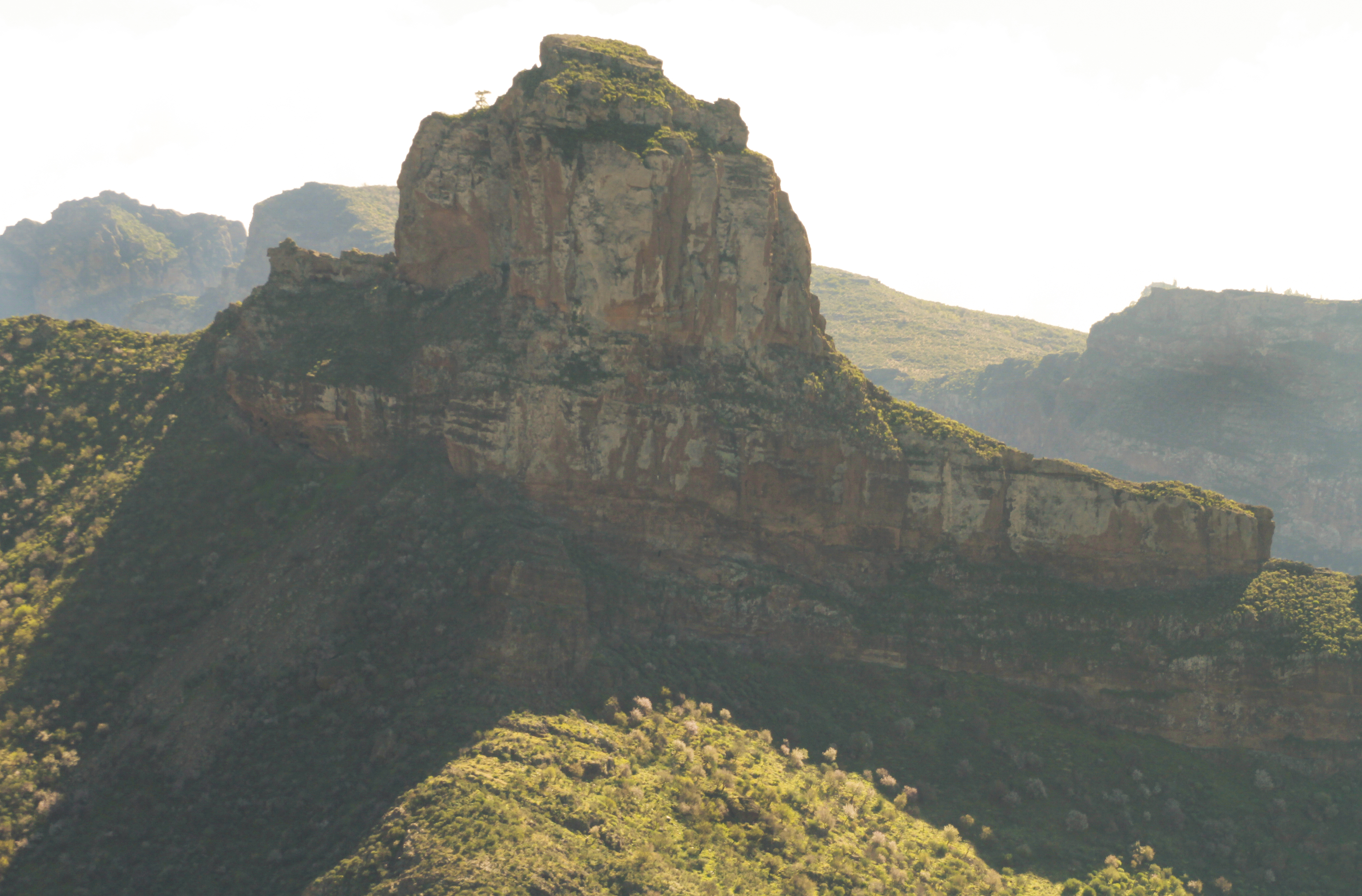
Roque Bentayga from the town of Artenara

=== Asia ===
Sigiriya is an ancient rock fortress near the town of Dambulla in Sri Lanka. Approximately 180m high, it is now a UNESCO listed World Heritage Site.

=== Europe ===
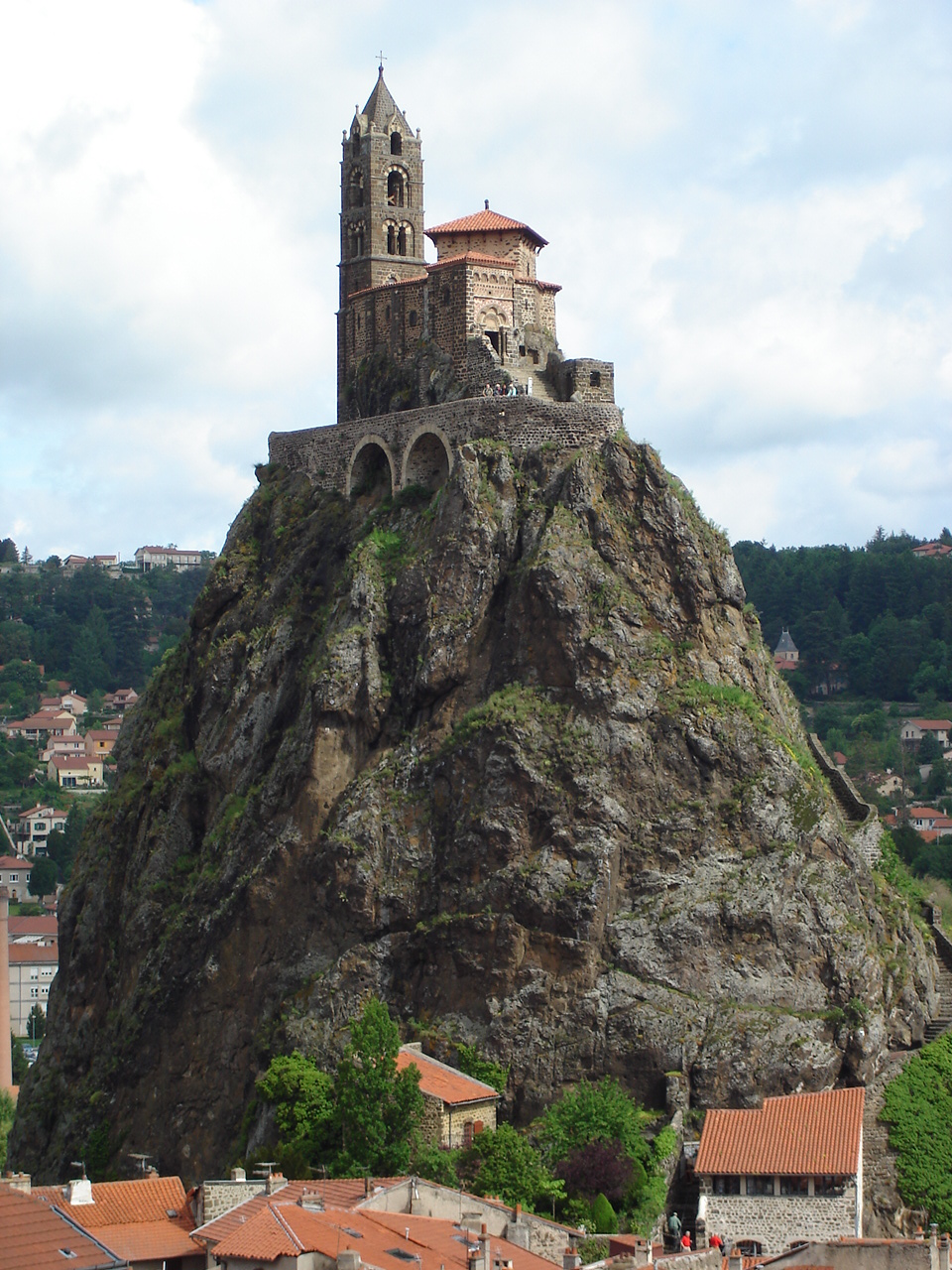
Saint Michel d'Aiguilhe chapel, on top of a volcanic plug in Le Puy-en-Velay, France.

Borgarvirki is a volcanic plug located in north Iceland.

A volcanic plug is situated in the town of Motta Sant'Anastasia in Italy.

Saint Michel d'Aiguilhe chapel, whose construction started in 969, near Le Puy-en-Velay in France. The volcanic plug rises about 85 metres (279 ft) above the surroundings. Another building on a volcanic plug is the 14th century Trosky Castle in the Czech Republic. Strombolicchio, the northernmost of the Aeolian Islands, and Rockall, a small, uninhabited, remote islet in the North Atlantic Ocean, are also volcanic plugs.

In the United Kingdom, two examples of a building on a volcanic plug are the Castle Rock in Edinburgh, Scotland, and Deganwy Castle, Wales. The Law, Dundee, Ailsa Craig, Bass Rock, North Berwick Law and Dumgoyne hill are other examples of volcanic plugs located in Scotland. There are over 30 volcanic plugs in Northern Ireland, including Slemish in Ballymena, Tievebulliagh, Scawt Hill, Carrickarede, Scrabo and Slieve Gallion.

=== North America and the Caribbean ===
There are several volcanic plugs in the United States, including Morro Rock in California, Devils Elbow located in the Heceta Head Lighthouse Scenic State Park on the Oregon coast, Thumb Butte in the Sierra Prieta of Arizona and Agathla Peak near Monument Valley, and Shiprock and Cabezon Peak, both found in New Mexico. Devils Tower in Wyoming and Little Devils Postpile in Yosemite National Park, California, are also believed, by many geologists, to be volcanic plugs. In Canada, the Northern Cordilleran Volcanic Province gives rise to several confirmed and suspected plugs. Chief among these is Castle Rock, located in British Columbia, which last erupted during the Pleistocene. The southern coast of Saint Lucia is dominated by the iconic Pitons, a UNESCO World Heritage Site. The twin peaks, Gros Piton and Petit Piton, steeply rise more than 770 metres (2,530 ft) above the Caribbean.

=== South America ===
Pinnacle Rock, Galápagos, Ecuador.

=== Oceania ===
There are several volcanic plugs in the North Island of New Zealand, including:

- the Pinnacles in the Coromandel Peninsula
- Bream Head in Northland
- Paritutu and the adjacent Sugar Loaf Islands in Taranaki
- St. Paul's Rock at Whangaroa Harbour
- Piha's Lion Rock, which hosted a fortified Maori pā
- Mount Pohaturoa near the village of Ātiamuri, a distinctive sight for travelers along State Highway 1

In New Zealand's South Island, Onawe Peninsula on Banks Peninsula is a prominent volcanic plug, and erosion of Saddle Hill near Dunedin has also revealed a plug. Dunedin's Mount Cargill displays two plugs: its main summit and the subsidiary summit of Buttar's Peak.

In Australia, The Nut in Tasmania are further examples, along with Mount Warning and the several peaks in the Warrumbungles in New South Wales. The 11 peaks of the Glasshouse Mountains National Park including Mount Beerwah, Mount Tibrogargan, Mount Coonowrin, Mount Cooroora, Mount Ngungun, Mount Tibberoowuccum, Mount Tunbubudla, and Mount Beerburrum, in South East Queensland are volcanic plugs.

== Gallery ==
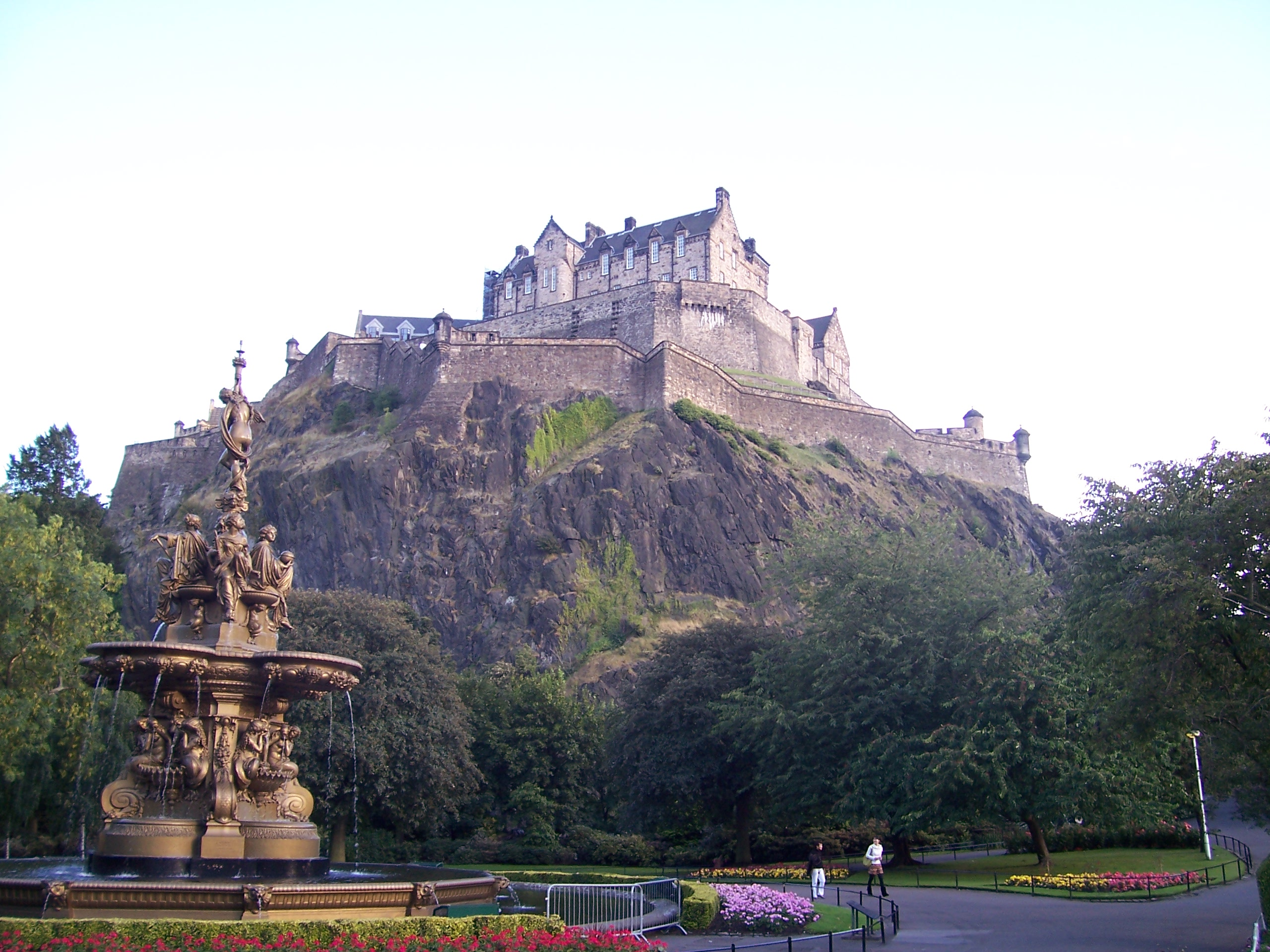
Edinburgh Castle in Scotland is built upon an ancient volcanic plug.

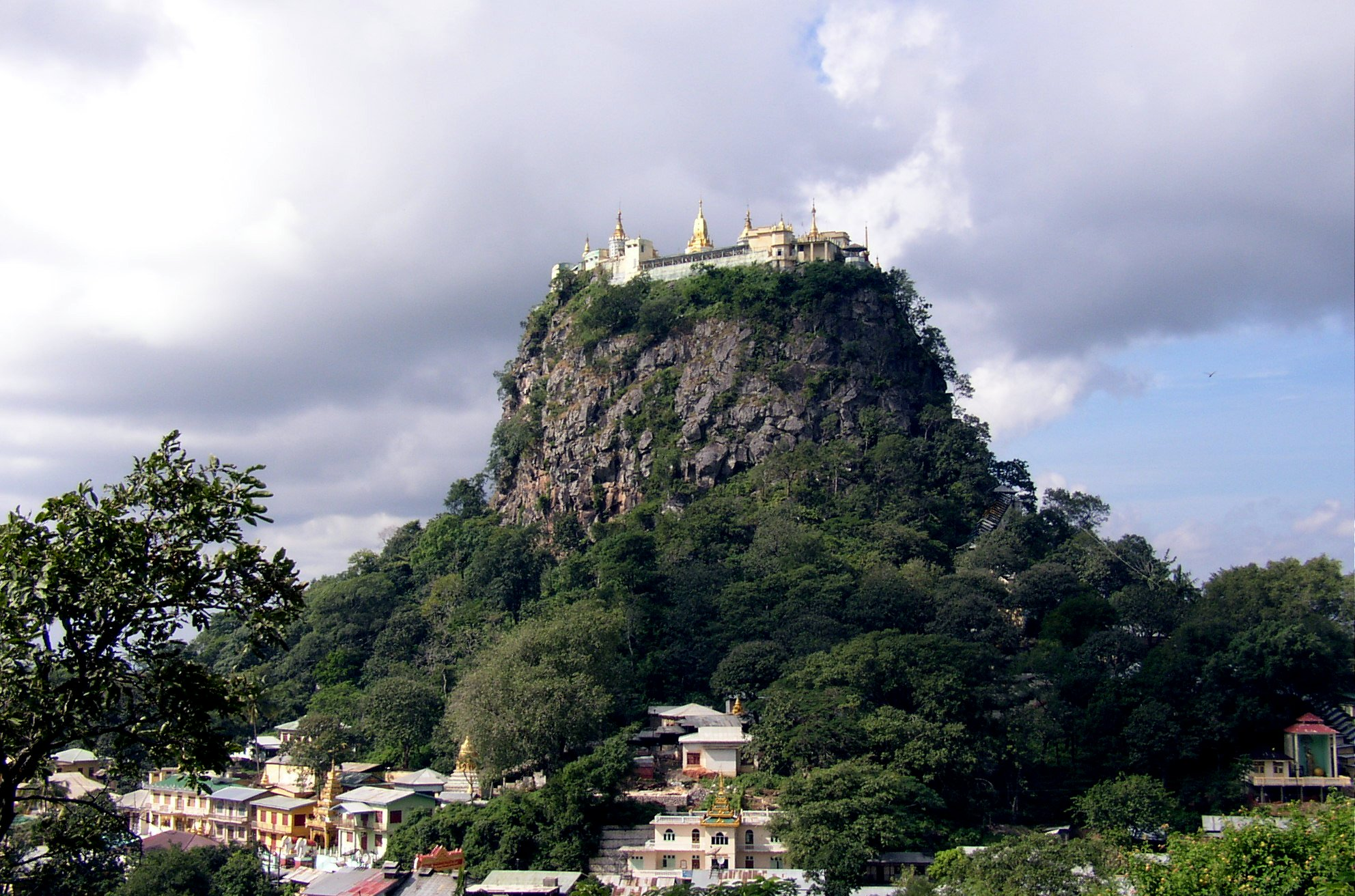
Taung Kalat, Burma.

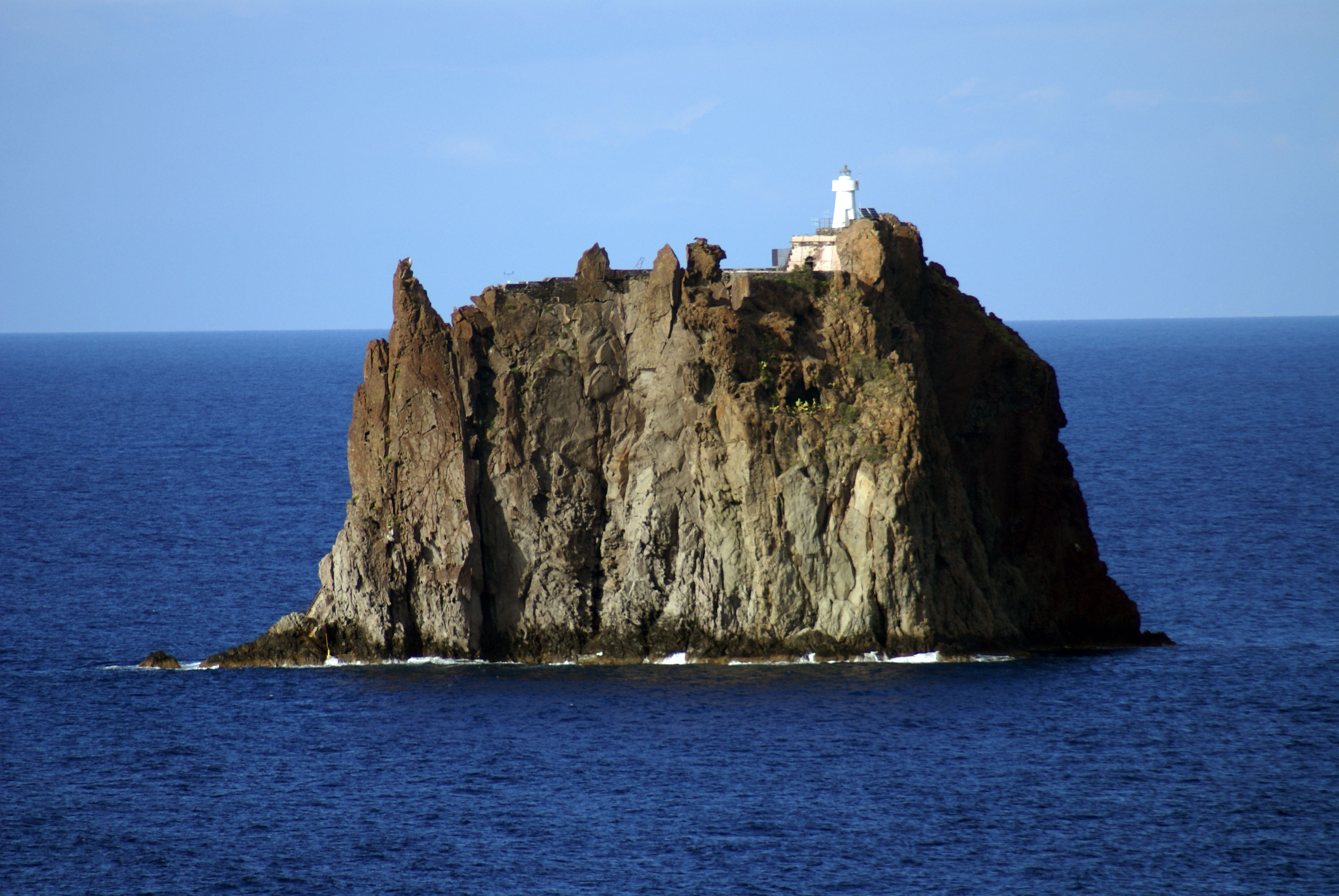
Strombolicchio Island and its lighthouse, close to Stromboli Island (Aeolian Islands, Italy).

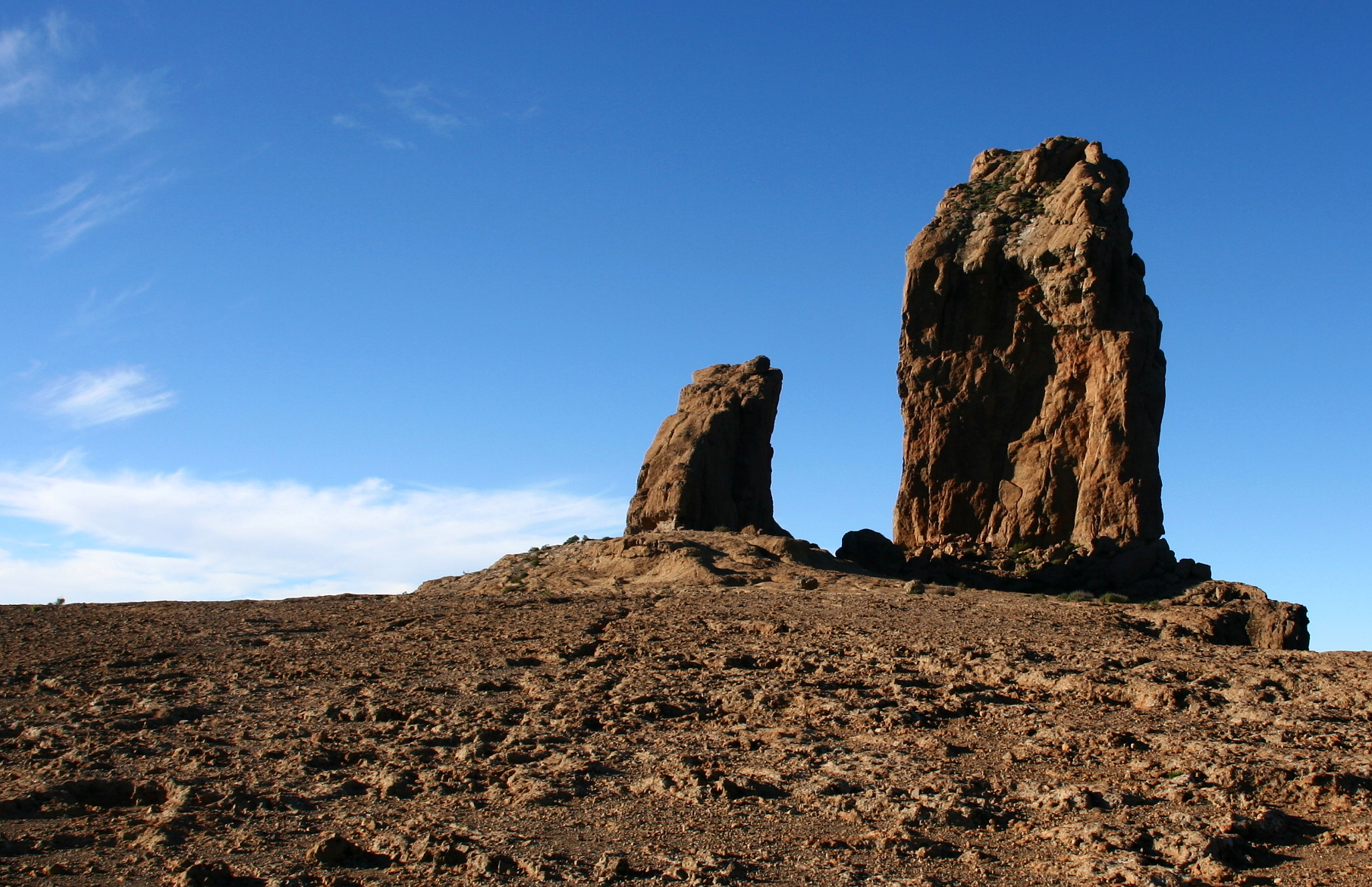
Roque Nublo, symbol of Gran Canaria island.

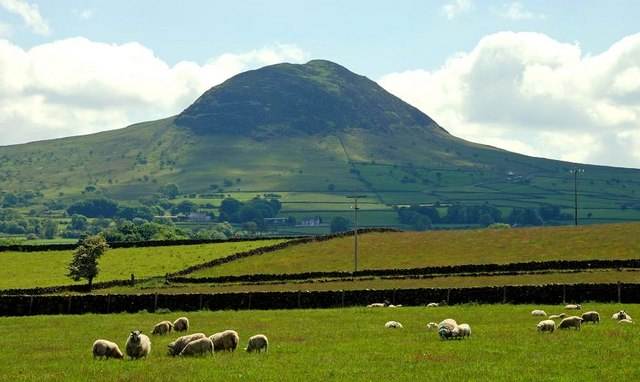
Slemish, a volcanic plug in Northern Ireland, is traditionally associated with St Patrick.

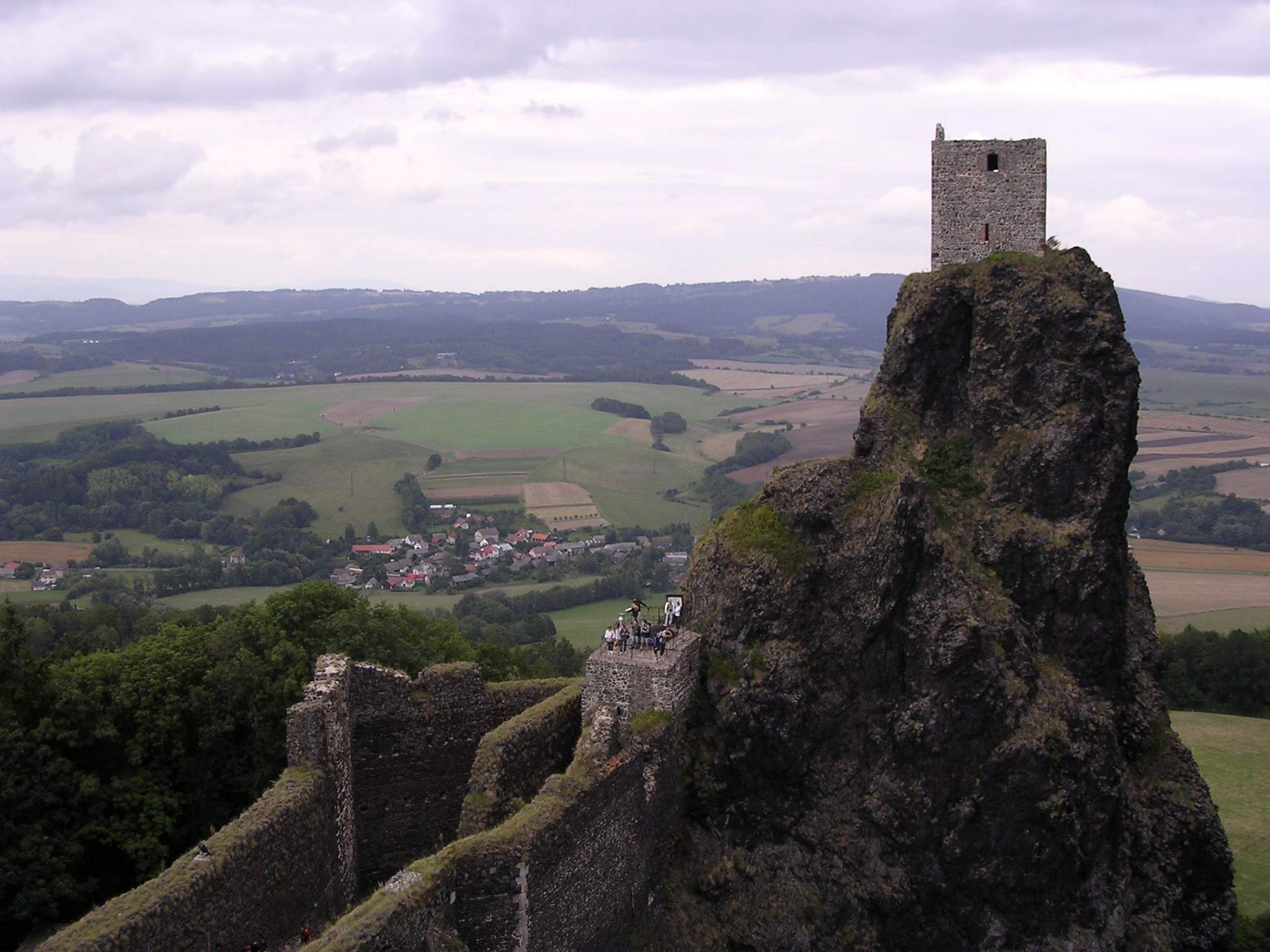
Trosky Castle ("Panna" Tower), Czech Republic.

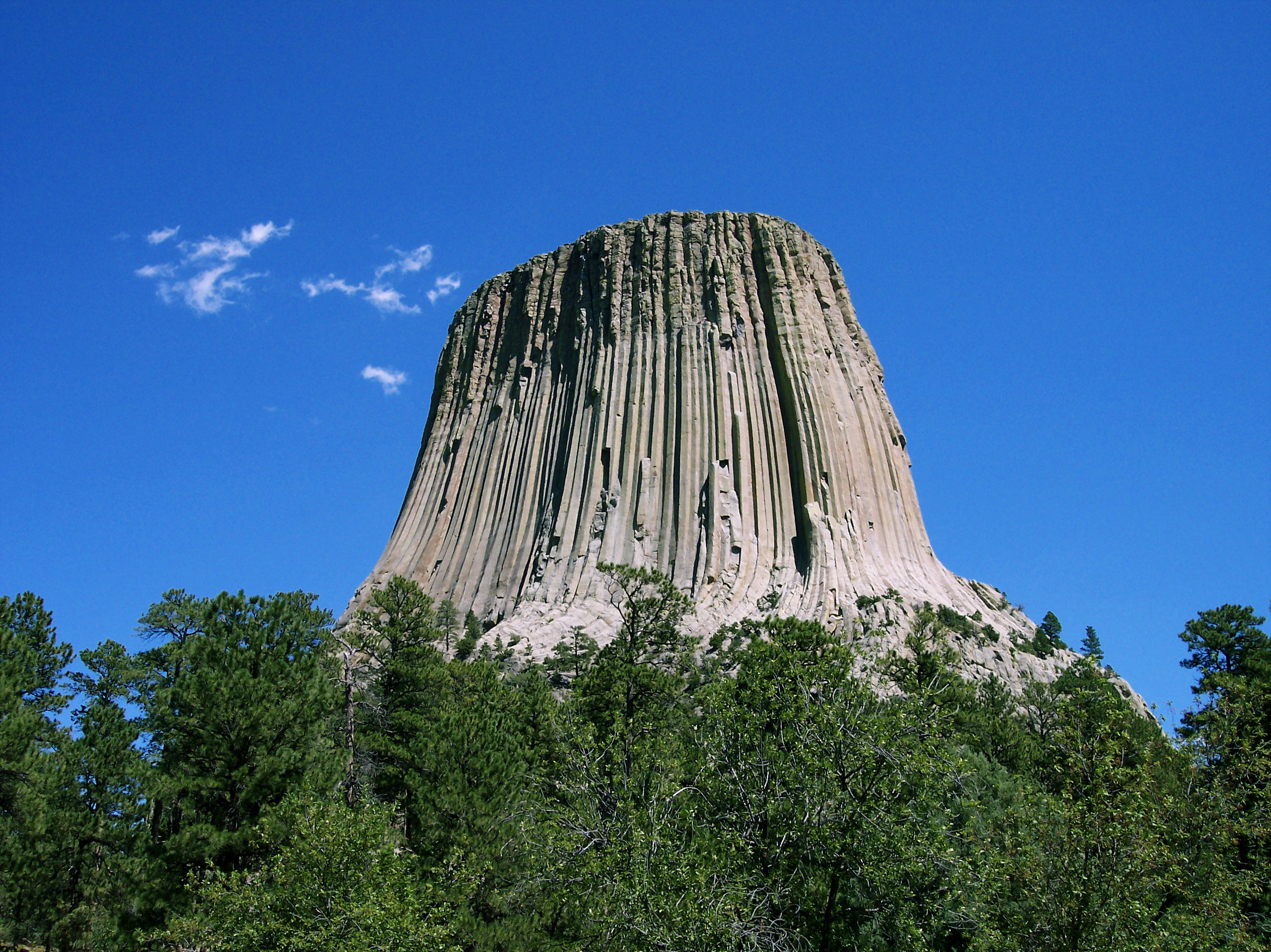
Devils Tower, Wyoming, USA.

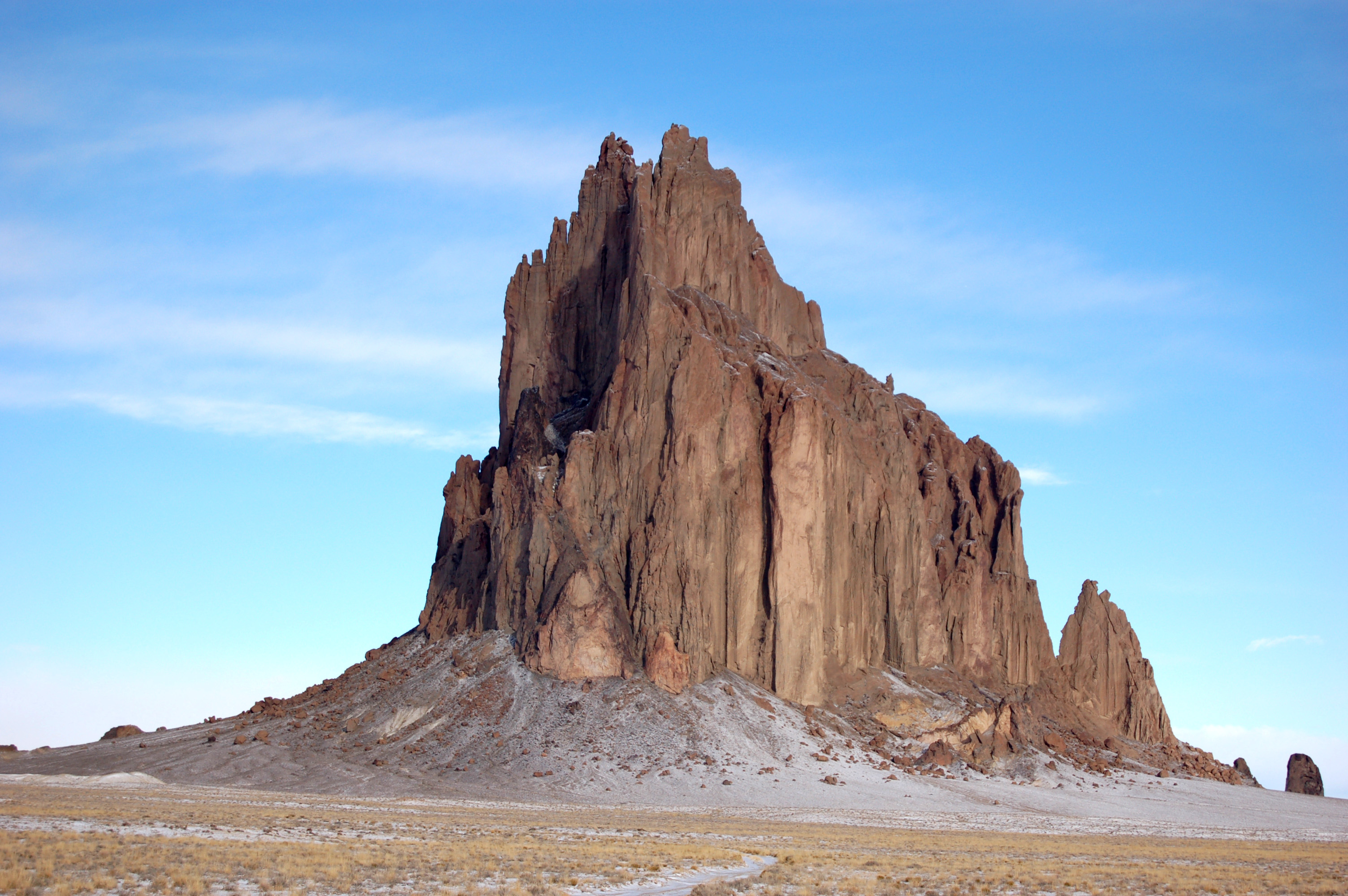
Shiprock, New Mexico, USA.

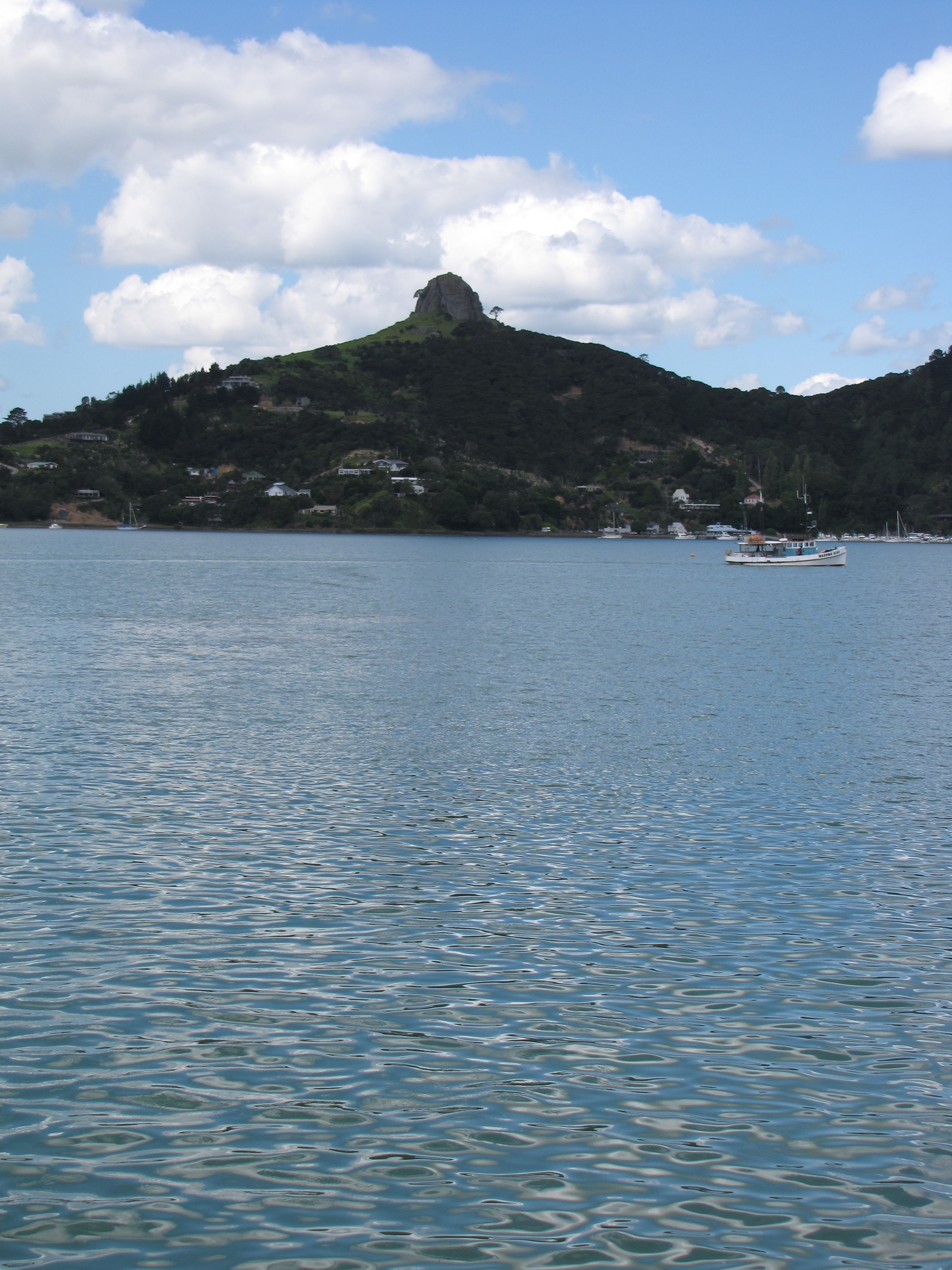
St. Paul's Rock, above Whangaroa Harbour, Northland, New Zealand.

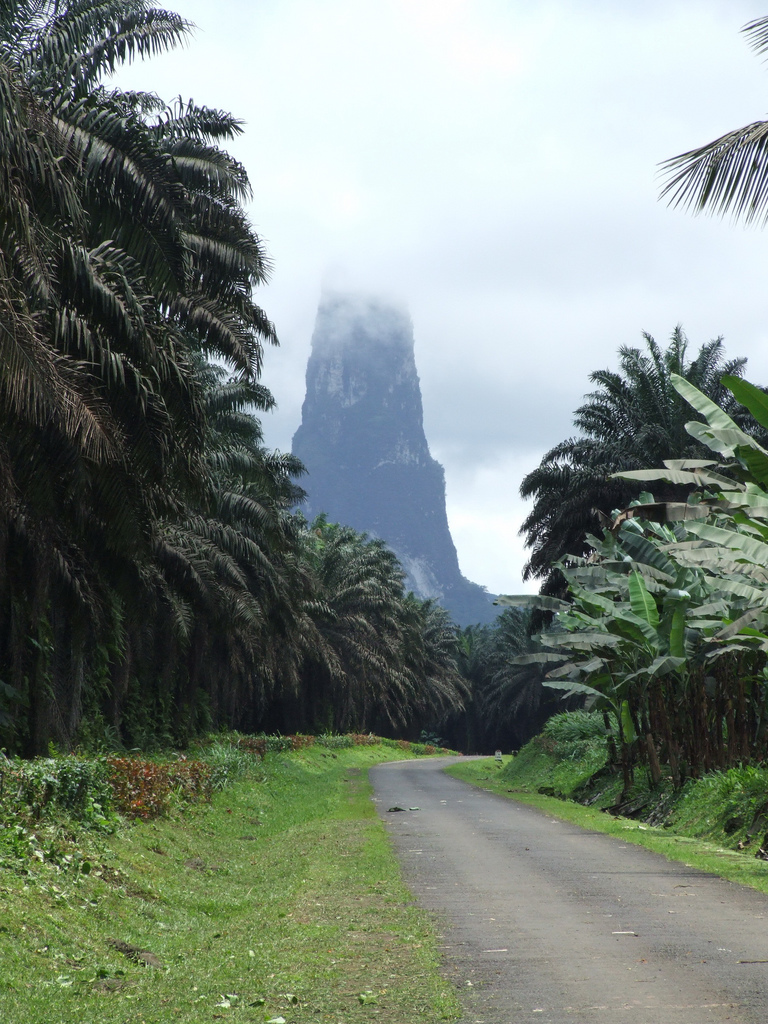
Pico Cão Grande, landmark volcanic plug peak on São Tomé Island (São Tomé and Príncipe), rising over 300 metres (980 ft) above the surroundings.

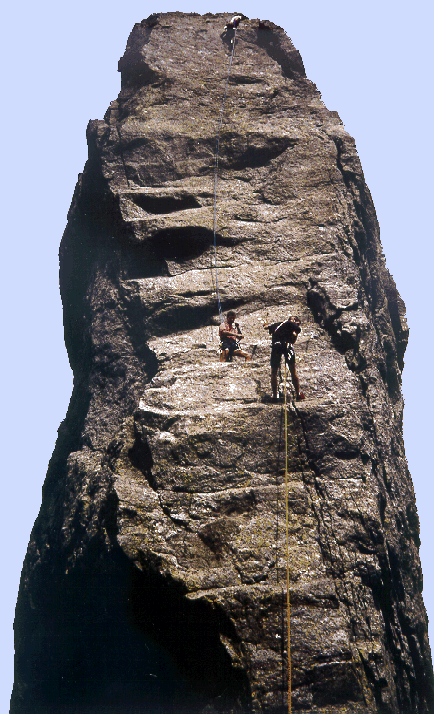
Dent de la Rancune, a challenging climbing site in the Chaîne des Puys, France.

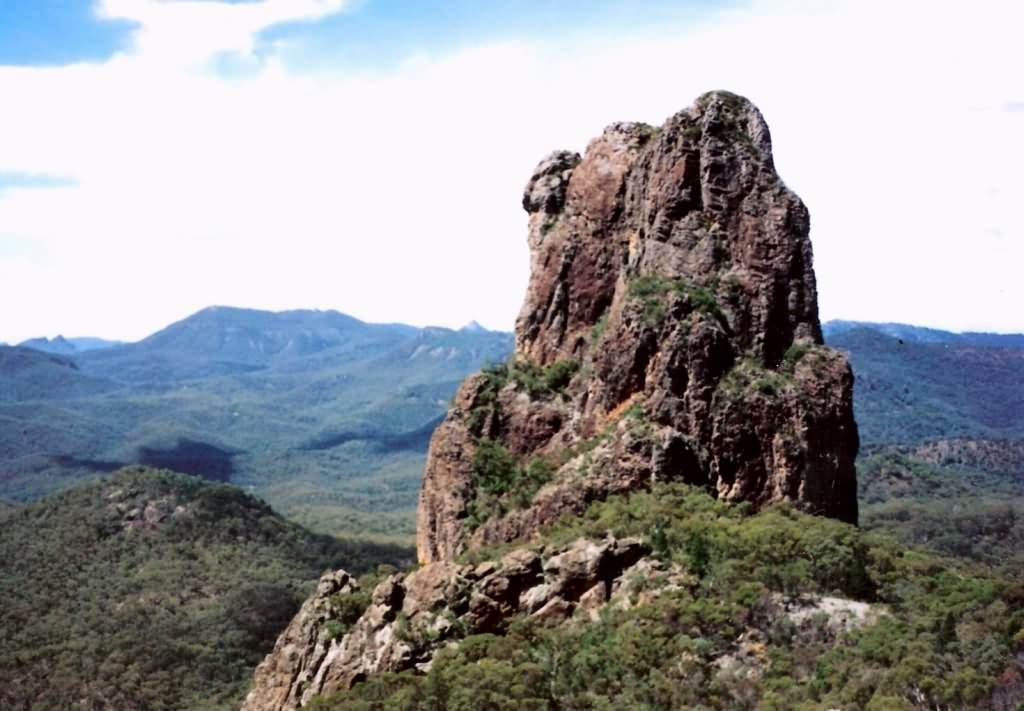
Crater Bluff in the Warrumbungles, New South Wales
