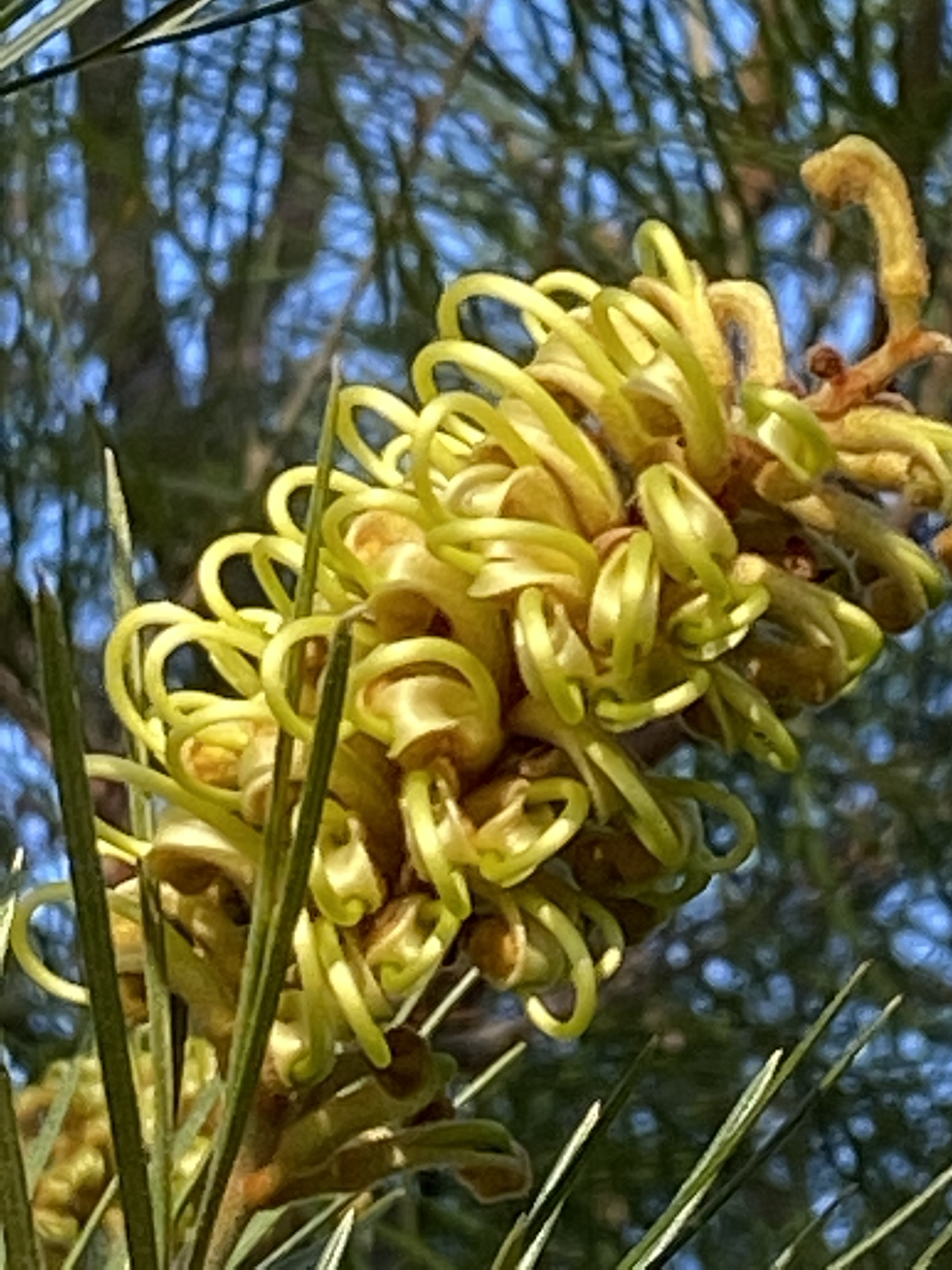

Conservation status
- Endangered (IUCN 3.1)

- Critically endangered (EPBC Act)

Scientific classification
- Kingdom: Plantae
- Clade: Embryophytes
- Clade: Tracheophytes
- Clade: Angiosperms
- Clade: Eudicots
- Order: Proteales
- Family: Proteaceae
- Genus: Grevillea
- Species: G. hodgei

Binomial name
- Grevillea hodgei Olde & Marriott

= Grevillea hodgei =

Species of shrub endemic to Queensland, Australia

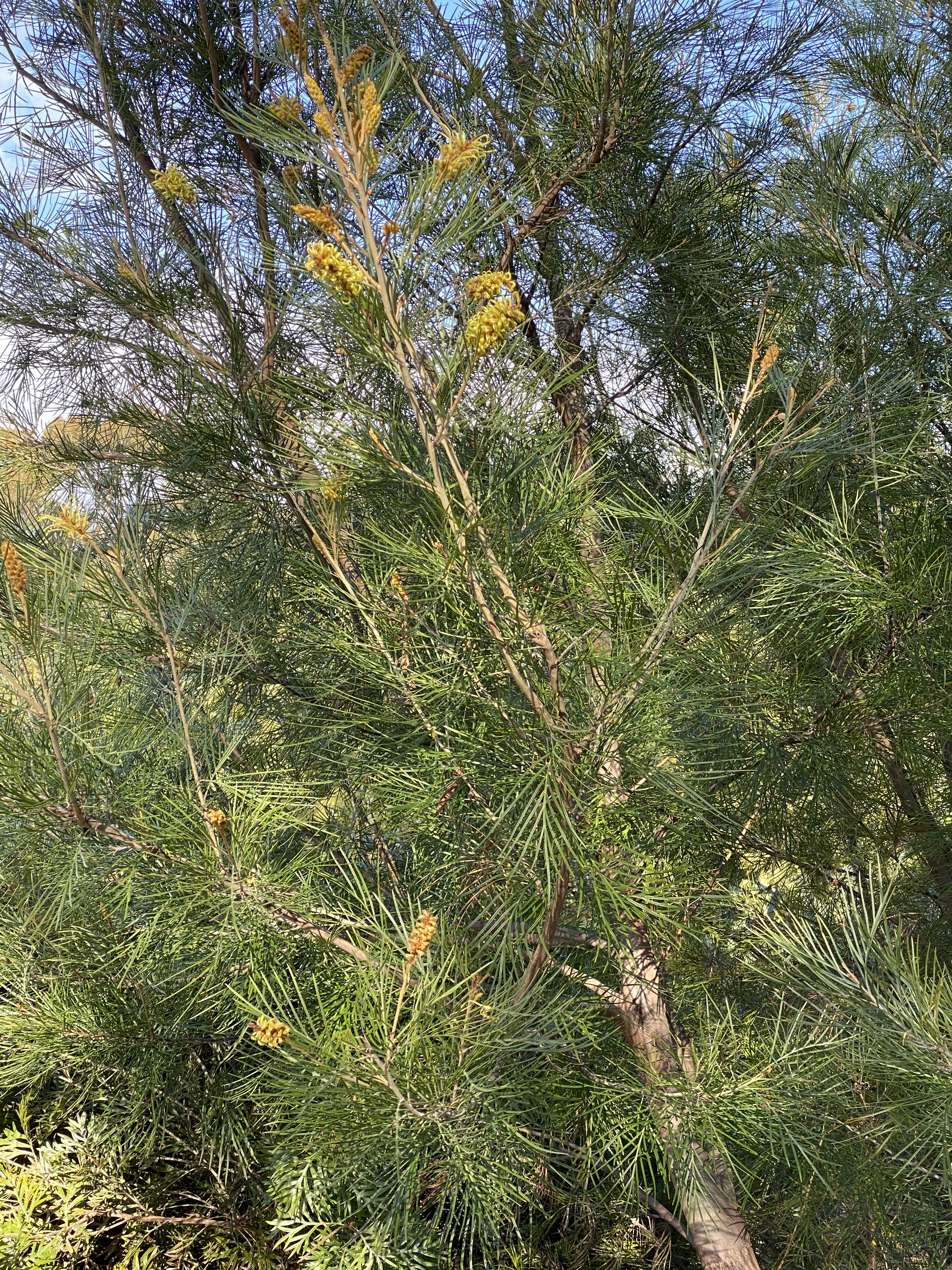
Habit

Grevillea hodgei, commonly known as the Coochin Hills grevillea, is a species of flowering plant in the family Proteaceae and is endemic to a restricted area of Queensland. It is an erect shrub with deeply divided leaves with erect, linear leaflets, and clusters of hairy, cream-coloured flowers.

== Description ==
Grevillea hodgei is an erect shrub that typically grows a height of 1–4 m (3 ft 3 in – 13 ft 1 in). Its leaves are 60–190 mm (2.4–7.5 in) long and deeply divided, the leaflets linear, 50–120 mm (2.0–4.7 in) long and 1.5–2.8 mm (0.059–0.110 in) wide with the edges rolled under and obscuring most of the lower surface. The flowers are arranged in erect, cylindrical clusters on a rachis 20–80 mm (0.79–3.15 in) long. The flowers are cream-coloured, partly covered with brown hairs, the pistil 26–35 mm (1.0–1.4 in) long. Flowering occurs year-round, peaking in March and October and the fruit is a woolly-hairy follicle 13–14 mm (0.51–0.55 in) long. G. hodgei is closely related to G. whiteana but can be distinguished by its shorter pistils, shorter rachis and more extensive hairs on the external surface of the perianth.

== Taxonomy ==
Grevillea hodgei was first formally described in 1994 by Peter M. Olde and Neil R. Marriott in The Grevillea Book from specimens Marriott collected near the Coochin Hills in the Glasshouse Mountains near Beerwah in 1992. The specific epithet (hodgei) honours Mervyn William Hodge.

== Distribution and habitat ==
Coochin Hills grevillea is known only from a highly restricted area in the Beerwah area in the south-eastern Queensland bioregion. It occurs in two subpopulations which are separated by urbanised areas and timber plantations. One subpopulation occurs in the protected area of Glasshouse Mountains National Park, while the other occurs on freehold tenure in Rupari Hill.

This species grows in full-sun or part-shade, in well-drained, skeletal sandy soils around exposed rocky platforms. It may also occur in deeper soils at a lower elevation in open woodland or shrubland.

== Conservation status ==
Grevillea hodgei is listed as endangered on the IUCN Red List of Threatened Species. It is also listed as critically endangered under the Australian Government Environment Protection and Biodiversity Conservation Act 1999 and the Queensland Government Nature Conservation Act 1992.

The species is threatened by inappropriate fire regimes, weed invasion and habitat loss through land clearing for infrastructure development, particularly in the Rupari Hill area. The population at Rupari Hill has been impacted due to habitat clearing for maintenance tracks and the installation of a water and microwave tower. Additionally, maintenance of underground services has resulted in the removal of a considerable amount of mature and juvenile G. hodgei plants. Ongoing maintenance of facilities at Rupari Hill and activities such as ringbarking and tree poisoning continue to be a threat for the species' habitat and population.

As G. hodgei is killed by fire, it is vulnerable to increased frequency of fires and is mainly threatened by inappropriate fire regimes. The interval between fires must be long enough to allow seedlings to reach maturity and produce a sufficient amount of seed to replace burned plants following the event of a fire. If fires are too frequent, plants will not have enough time to reach maturity and the population will decline. Conversely, if seeds require fire to germinate, too infrequent fires could also contribute to population decline. Weed invasion on the rocky ledges where the species occurs may contribute to the risk and intensity of fires.

Due to its restricted distribution and small population, it is highly vulnerable to stochastic events, including prolonged periods of drought and increased fire frequency. It may likely also have low genetic diversity which could impact the long-term survival of the species.

The species has an Approved Conservation Advice document under the EPBC Act. There is no approved recovery plan, as the current document provides sufficient information for the proposal of conservation actions.

== See also ==
- List of Grevillea species
