= Glass House Mountains =

Mountain range in Queensland, Australia

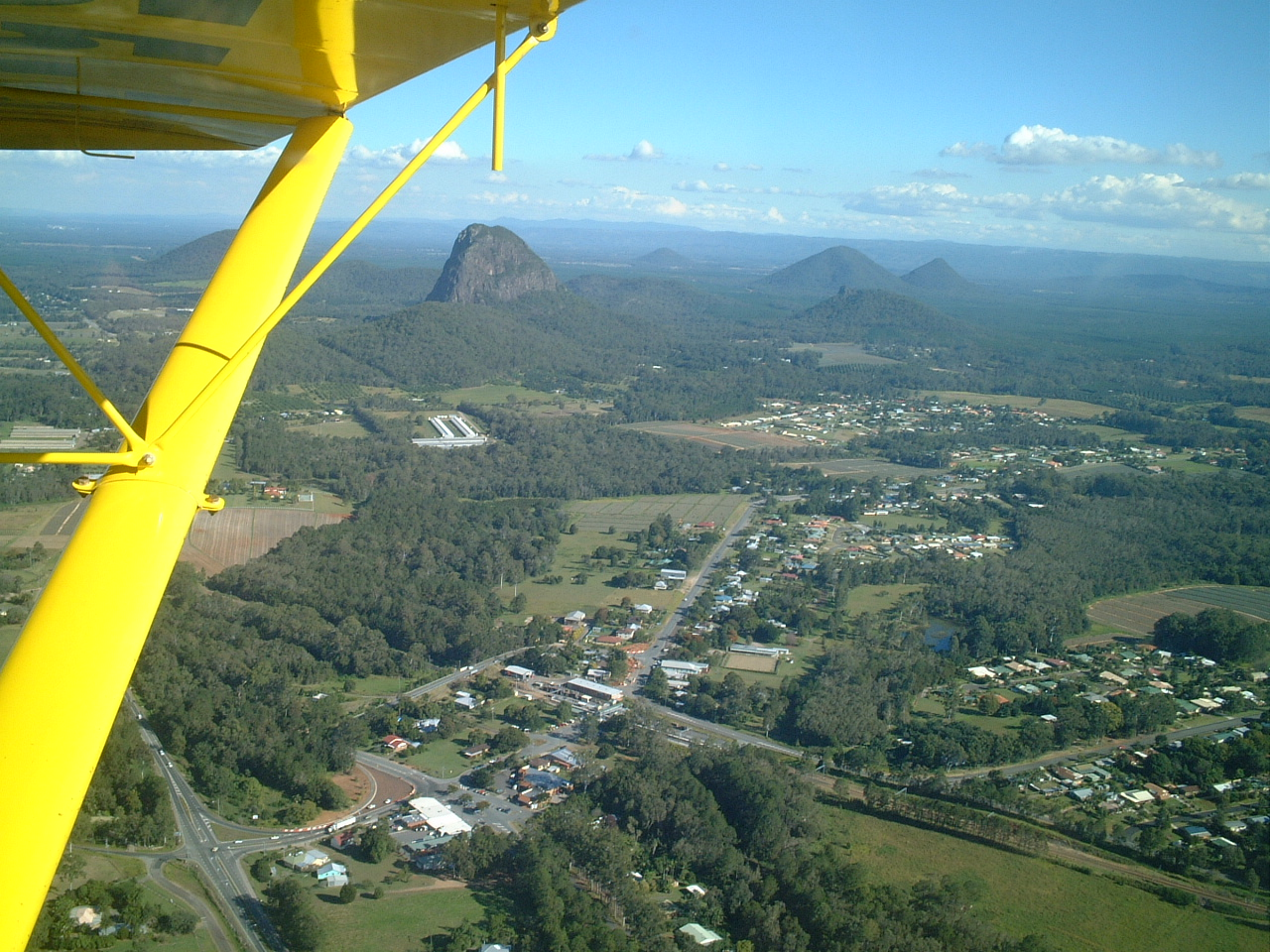
- Aerial photo of Glass House Mountains township with the Glass House Mountains in the distance

Highest point
- Peak: Mount Beerwah
- Elevation: 556 m (1,824 ft)
- Coordinates: 26°54′S 152°55′E

Geography
- Location within Queensland
- Country: Australia
- State: Queensland
- Region: South East Queensland

Geology
- Formed by: Volcanic plugs
- Rock age: Tertiary

The Glass House Mountains are a cluster of thirteen hills that rise abruptly from the coastal plain on the Sunshine Coast, Queensland, Australia. The highest hill is Mount Beerwah at 556 metres above sea level, but the most identifiable of all the hills is Mount Tibrogargan which from certain angles bears a resemblance to a person facing east towards the ocean. The Glass House Mountains are located near Beerburrum State Forest and Steve Irwin Way. From Brisbane, the mountains can be reached by following the Bruce Highway north and taking the Glass House Mountains tourist drive turn-off onto Steve Irwin Way. The trip is about one hour from Brisbane. Additionally, 7 of the 13 peaks' trailheads are accessible within 11 minutes to an hour's walk from either Elimbah, Beerburrum, Glass House Mountains, or Beerwah train stations, each station also taking roughly an hour to get to from Central Station. The Volcanic peaks of the Glass House Mountains rise dramatically from the surrounding Sunshine Coast landscape. They were formed by intrusive plugs, remnants of volcanic activity that occurred 26–27 million years ago. Molten rock filled small vents or intruded as bodies beneath the surface and solidified into land rocks. Millions of years of erosion have removed the surrounding exteriors of volcanic cores and softer sandstone rock.

On 17 May 1770, the hills were named the "Glass House Mountains" by explorer Lieutenant James Cook. The peaks reminded him of the glass furnaces in his home county of Yorkshire. The traditional names of the individual peaks are much older however and are derived from the local Aboriginal languages of the Gubbi Gubbi and Jinibara people. Matthew Flinders explored the area and climbed Mount Beerburrum after sailing along Pumicestone Passage in 1799. The Glass House Mountains National Landscape was added to the Australian National Heritage List on 3 August 2006. In the land between the peaks, pineapple and poultry farming, as well as commercial forestry and quarrying are the main land uses.

In 2009 as part of the Q150 celebrations, the Glass House Mountains was announced as one of the Q150 Icons of Queensland for its role as a "Natural attraction".

== Geology ==
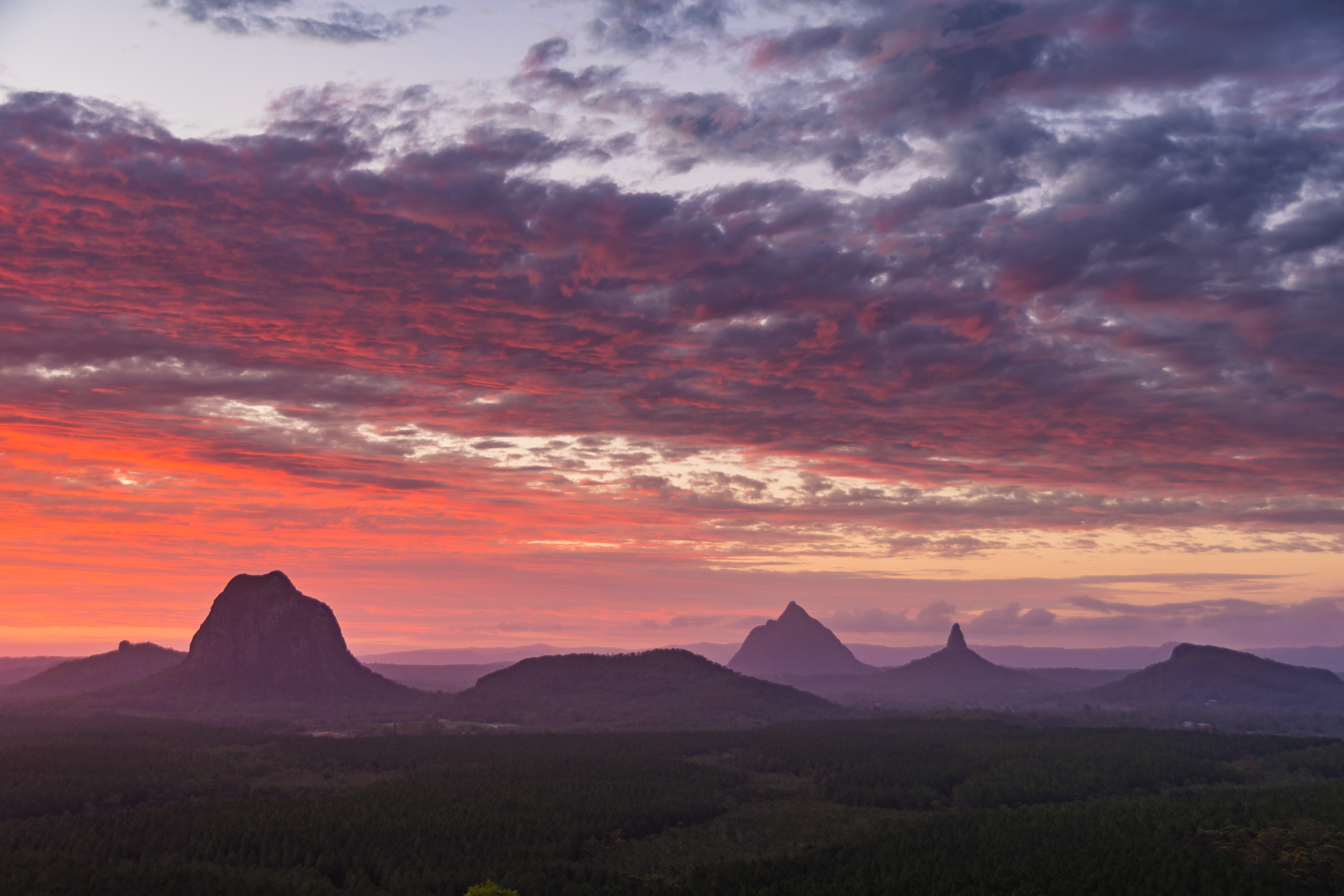
Sacred Site Mountain View

The range was formed as molten lava cooled to form hard rock in the cores of volcanoes 26–27 million years ago. The source of the lava was from the East Australia hotspot. The cores of the hills contain columns of comendite from lava which cools quickly into a hard rock. The surrounding softer rocks have been eroded in the subsequent time, forming the spectacular volcanic plugs that remain today. The peaks' location relative to each other exhibits an alignment that is believed to have occurred due to fracturing. Mt Ngungun consists of subvolcanic rock, also known as a hypabyssal rock, an intrusive rock emplaced at medium-to-shallow depths within the crust and has intermediate grain size, and often porphyritic texture between that of volcanic and plutonic rocks.

== Peaks ==
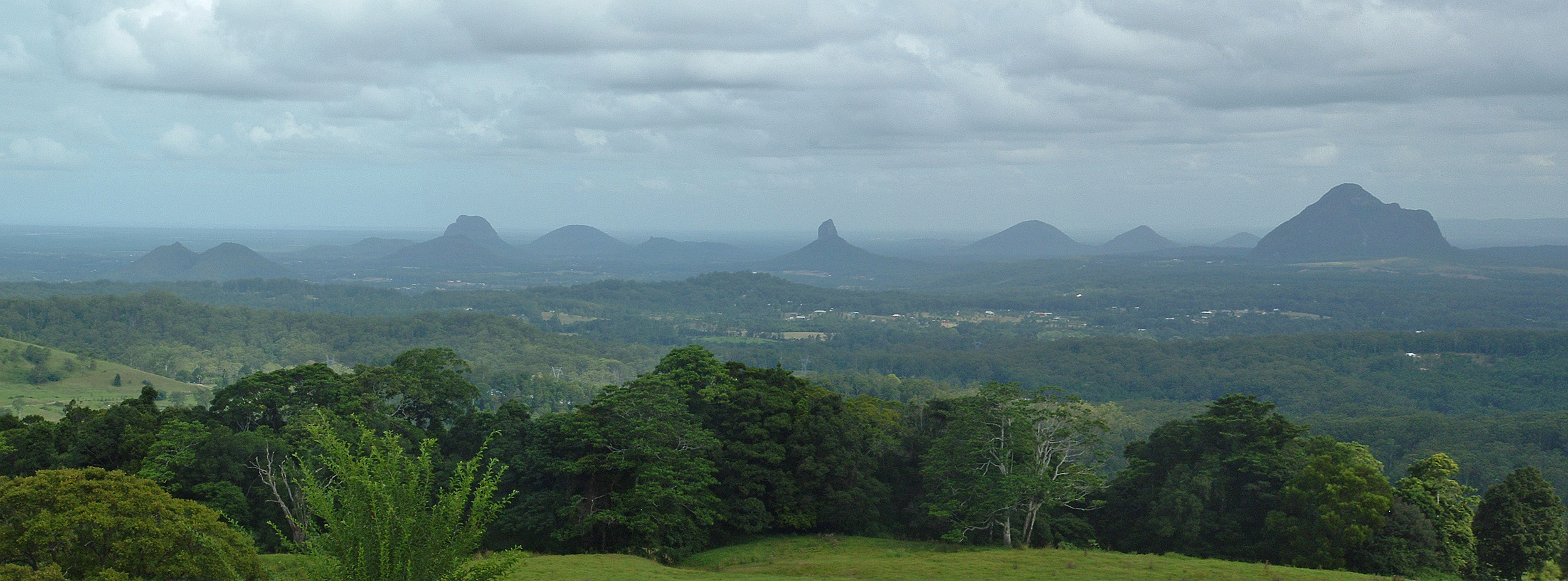
Glass House Mountains viewed from Mary Cairncross Reserve

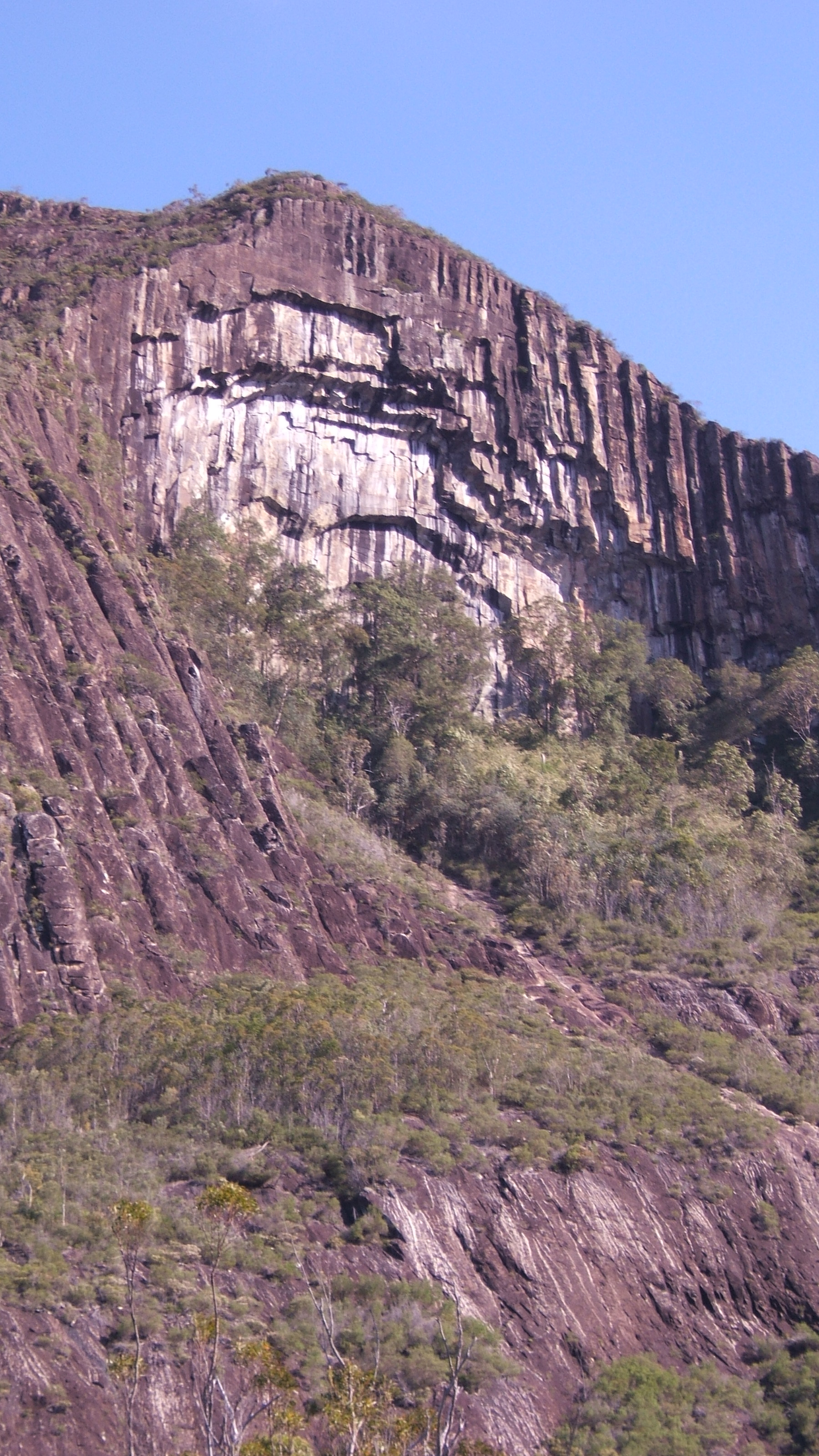
The cliffs of Mount Beerwah

Each of the peaks is protected within the Glass House Mountains National Park. Some of the peaks display vertical columns, particularly Mount Coonowrin, Mount Ngungun and Mount Beerwah at the Organ Pipes. These columns are the result of lava contraction. Scattered throughout the hills are shallow caves which have been formed by wind erosion on rocks that were softened by groundwater. The peaks are culturally significant to the traditional owners, the Gubbi Gubbi people and the Jinibara people. To the south east of the Glass House Mountains township is an Aboriginal bora ring. Prominent peaks in the range include:

- Mount Beerwah, 556 m
- Mount Coonowrin or Crookneck, 377 m
- Mount Tibrogargan, 364 m
- Mount Tunbubudla East, 338m
- Mount Tunbubudla West, 296m
- Mount Beerburrum, 278m
- Mount Ngungun, Mount Ngun Ngun said as Gun Gun 253 m
- Mount Coochin West, 235m
- Mount Coochin East, 230m
- Mount Tibberroowuccum, 220m
- Mount Miketeebumulgrai or Mount Mike, 202m
- Mount Cooee, 177 m
- Wild Horse Mountain, 123 m
- Mount Elimah or The Saddleback, 109-120m (depending on source)
- Round Mountain, 97m

== Aboriginal cultural knowledge ==
The Glass House Mountains are located in the traditional lands of the Jinibara and Gubbi Gubbi people. First Nations Australians have an elaborate legend about the mountains. Mt Beerwah in particular has extreme significance to the Jinibara People, with sites used as birthing areas by Indigenous women.

== Public access ==
The mountains are managed by Queensland National Parks and are promoted as a tourist asset. Historically bushwalking and climbing has been undertaken for more than a century. However the two largest mountains have been closed by National Parks in recent years. Firstly, Coonowrin was closed in 1999 as a result of a geological report and the development of an adjacent rock quarry. Secondly, the walking track used to access Mt Beerwah was closed in 2009 as the result of a rock collapse from the caves area across the main tourist track and was reopened January 2016. Tibrogargan and Ngungun are open to the public for bushwalking and climbing.

The Beerwah and Tibrogargan mountains are culturally significant and are sacred to the local Jinibara and Kabi Kabi people. Mt Beerwah is considered the mother of the range and is considered so sacred to the Gubi Gubi, that stories about it are not discussed. Both local groups ask visitors not to climb the Beerwah and Tibrogargan mountains out of respect for the mountains' sacred values and have been calling for a ban publicly since the mid-1990s. In the Gubi Gubi tradition, climbing Mt Beerwah brings bad luck.

The Beerwah and Tibrogargan mountains require some climbing ability and scrambling to reach the summit. Several climbers have fallen to their death. More than 110 rescues have been undertaken to save stricken climbers in the mountains.

== Flora and fauna ==
There are many different types of plants including trees, grass, bushes and the occasional shrub. Animals that live there include birds, reptiles, frogs, bats, rats, cats and mammals. The Elf Skink, a small lizard, also populates the area.

== See also ==
- List of mountains in Australia
