= Wild Horse Mountain =

Mountain in Sunshine Coast, Queensland, Australia

Coordinates: 26.93056°S 152.99833°E

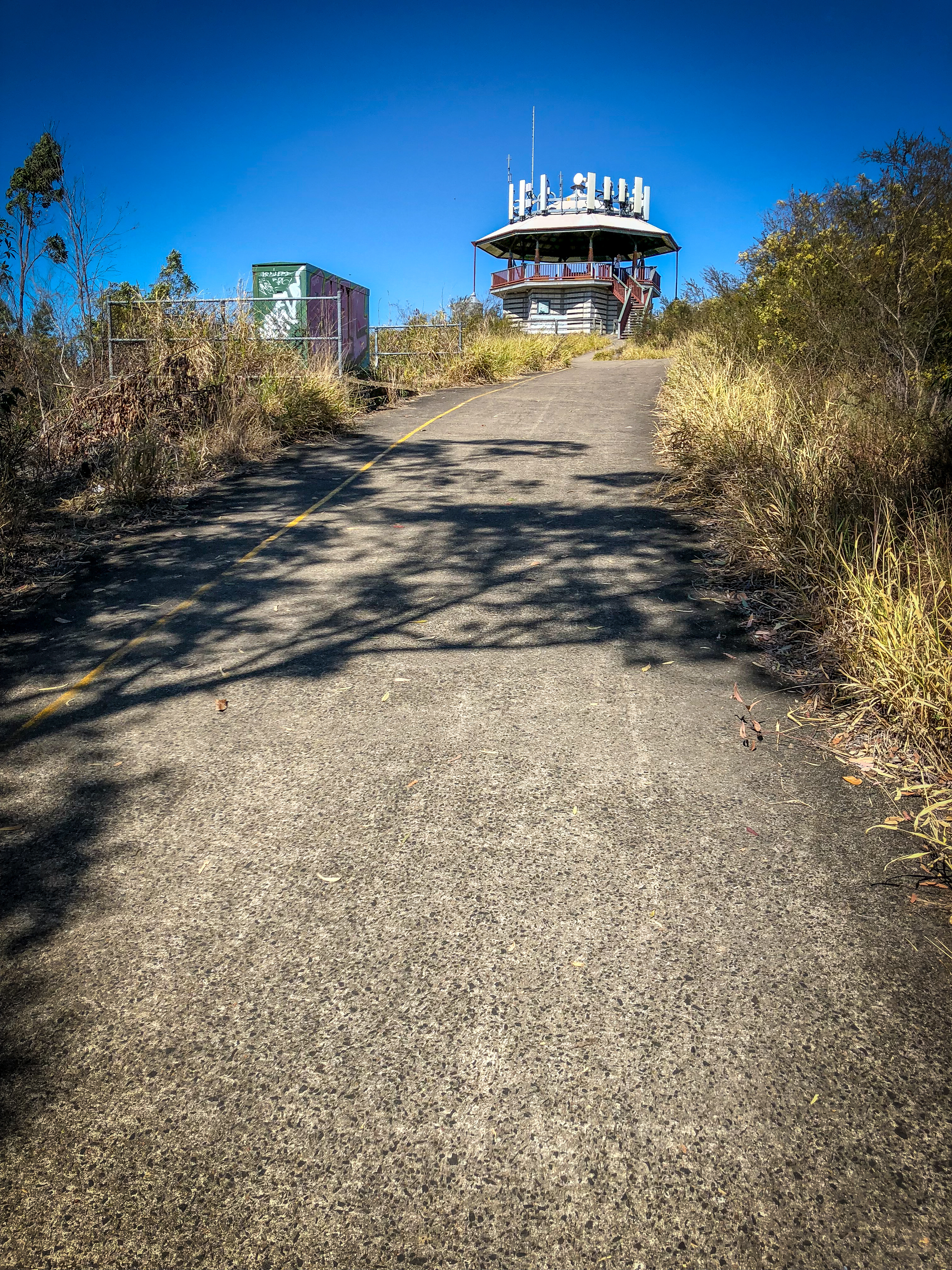
Path up to Wild Horse Mountain Lookout, 2018

Wild Horse Mountain is the smallest of the Glass House Mountains on the Sunshine Coast, Queensland, Australia. It is within the locality of Coochin Creek in the Sunshine Coast Region. The peak rises to 123 metres (404 ft). It is located east of the Bruce Highway unlike all other peaks within the Glass House Mountains and thus provides great views of the other mountains.

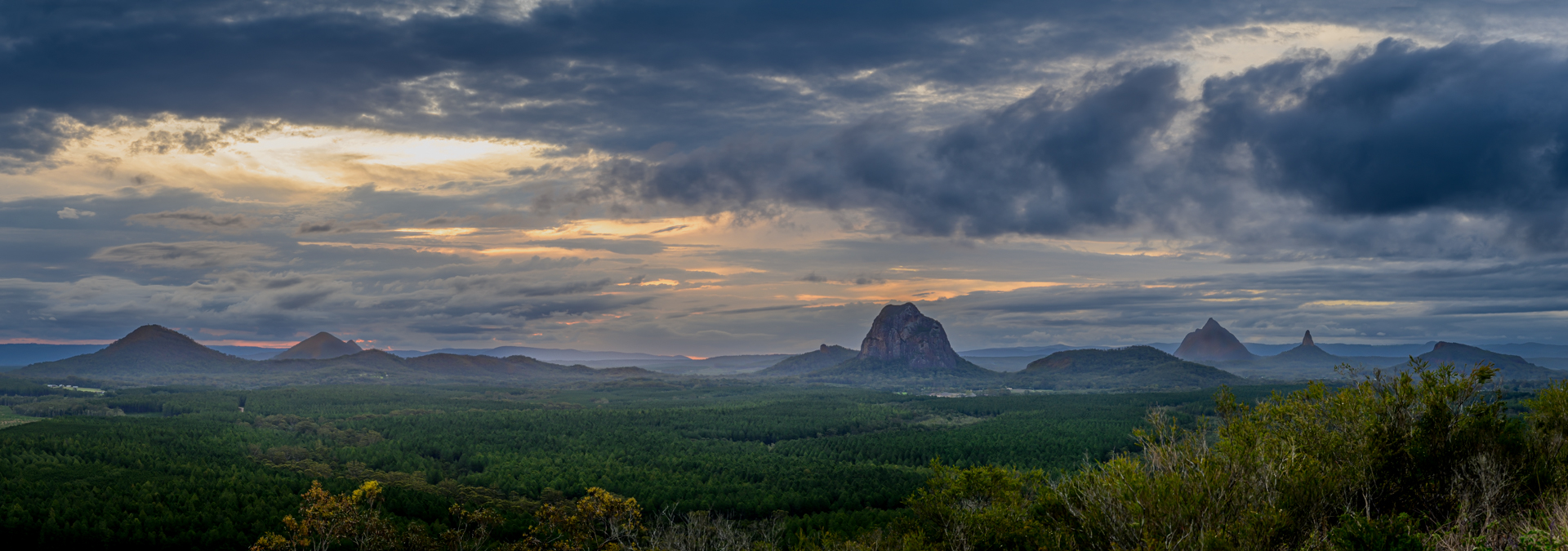
View of the Glass House Mountains from Wild Horse Mountain

It is arguably the most accessible mountain in the local range with a narrow asphalt and concrete road which runs directly to the top. The road is locked with a gate and a larger car park is provided near the base providing a simple walk for most people. A rotunda style building with an interpretive centre has been built at the summit with views limited only by the weather and curvature.

The mountain is part of the Beerburrum East State Forest area which is managed by the Queensland Government's Parks and Forests service.

The nearby service station previously ran a regular bus as a tourist attraction for viewing the rest of the Glasshouse mountains.

== See also ==
- List of mountains of Australia
