= Mount Tibrogargan =

Mountain near Brisbane, Australia

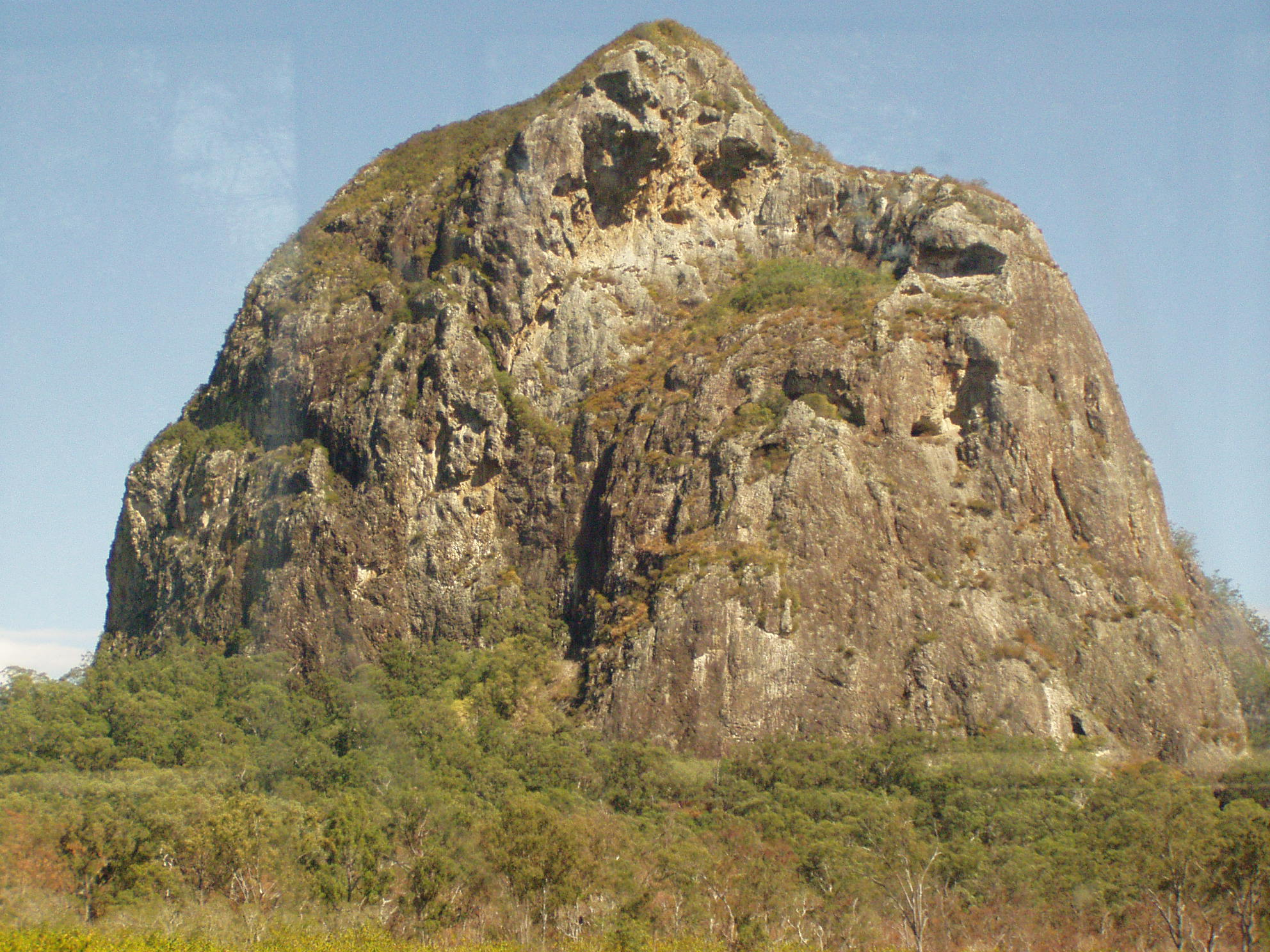

Highest point
- Elevation: 364 m (1,194 ft)
- Coordinates: 26°56′S 152°57′E

Geography
- Location within Queensland
- Location: Queensland, Australia
- Parent range: Glass House Mountains

Mount Tibrogargan is a small mountain in the Glass House Mountains National Park, north-northwest of Brisbane, Australia. It is a magma intrusion of hard alkali rhyolite that squeezed up into the vents of an ancient volcano 27 million years ago.

Tibrogargan is one of the most easily recognised hills in South East Queensland, bearing some resemblance to a woman holding a baby looking over her shoulder. However, in 2004 parts of the rock face that resembled eyes eroded and subsequently crumbled off. The name Tibrogargan comes from the local aboriginal words chibur flying squirrel and kaiyathin biting.

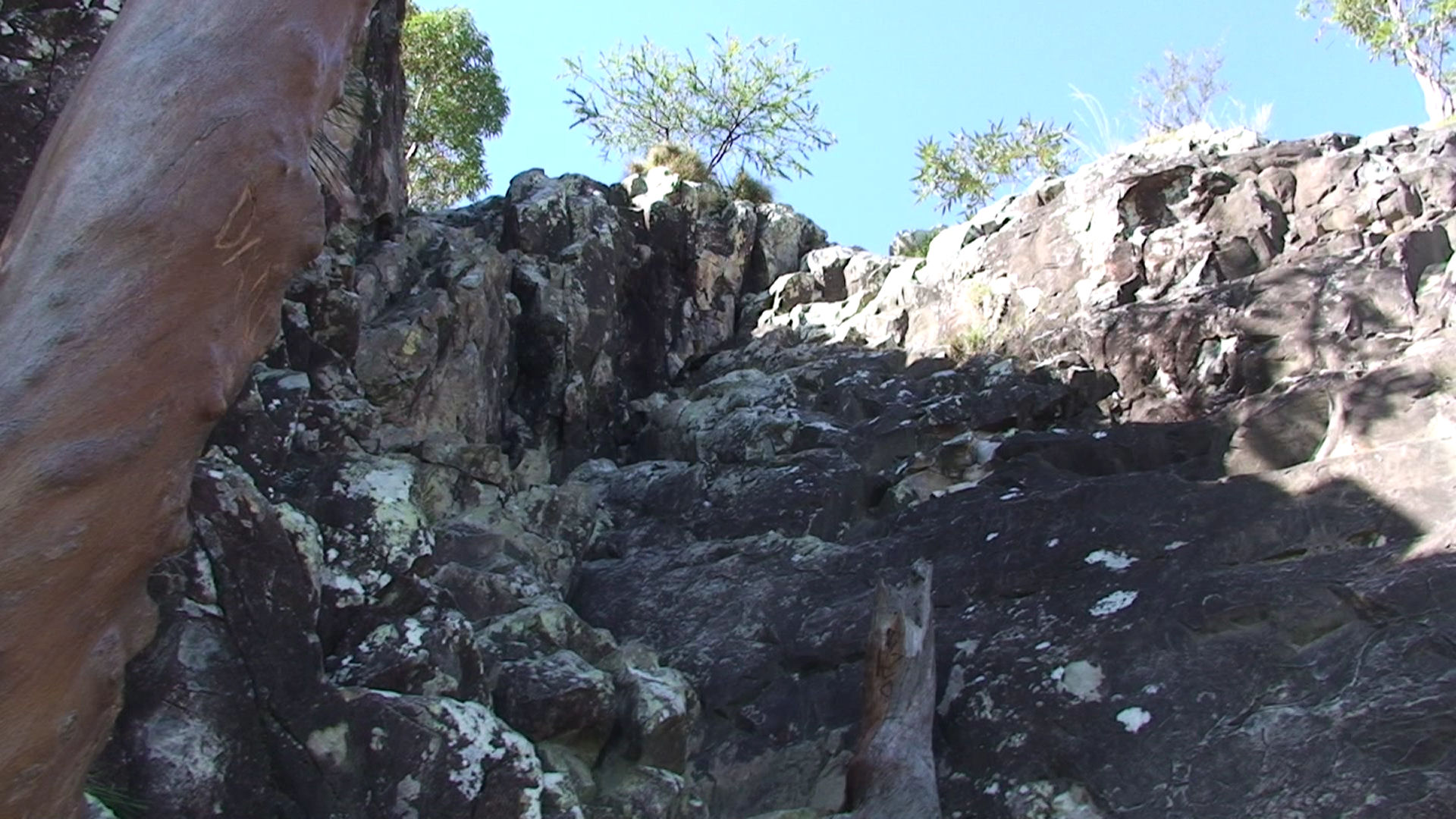
Steep Tibrogargan Summit Track

In the mythology of the region, Tibrogargan was the father of all the other Glass House Mountains except Beerwah, his wife. It was said that Tibrogargan saw a rising of the waters from the sea, and called to his son Coonowrin to take his mother Beerwah to a safe place; however, Coonowrin (a.k.a. Crookneck) failed to do so, and in anger Tibrogargan clubbed Coonowrin and broke his neck. Tibrogargan is said to have turned his back to face Coonowrin.

Tibrogargan is relatively small compared to mountains in Queensland and elsewhere, standing at 364 metres, but is the third tallest of the Glasshouse Mountains being 192m shorter than the tallest of the group (Mount Beerwah at 556m). The scramble to the summit via the route on the Western side of the mountain is a relatively straightforward one if heights and scrambling up near vertical rock face are not daunting. Climbers do not need technical skills such as abseiling. The mountain is a popular destination for bushwalkers, and tourists. Some visitors have got into difficulty on the hill and have been the subject of rescues by the State Emergency Service and rescue helicopters.

Tibrogargan is also popular amongst rockclimbers, with a number of free climbing routes found on the hill, ranging in grade from beginner to expert, both single and multi pitch traditional and sport climbs. The majority of these are found on the Eastern side of Mt Tibrogargan.

Public access to the tallest and second tallest Glasshouse Mountains reopened at the end of 2015 after being closed from 2009 to 2015 and 1999 respectively. The path is well worn and visible on the SW shoulder but the views from the summit are restricted due to vegetation in comparison to the other nearby rocky peaks.

There are other less demanding walking trails in the immediate surroundings of Tibrogargan, including the Tibrogargan Circuit (3.3 kilometres (2.1 mi)) and the Trachyte Circuit (5.6 kilometres (3.5 mi)). All trails leave from the carpark at the base of Tibrogargan, including the summit climb.

== See also ==
- List of volcanoes in Australia
- List of mountains in Australia
