= Mount Beerwah =

Mountain in Queensland, Australia

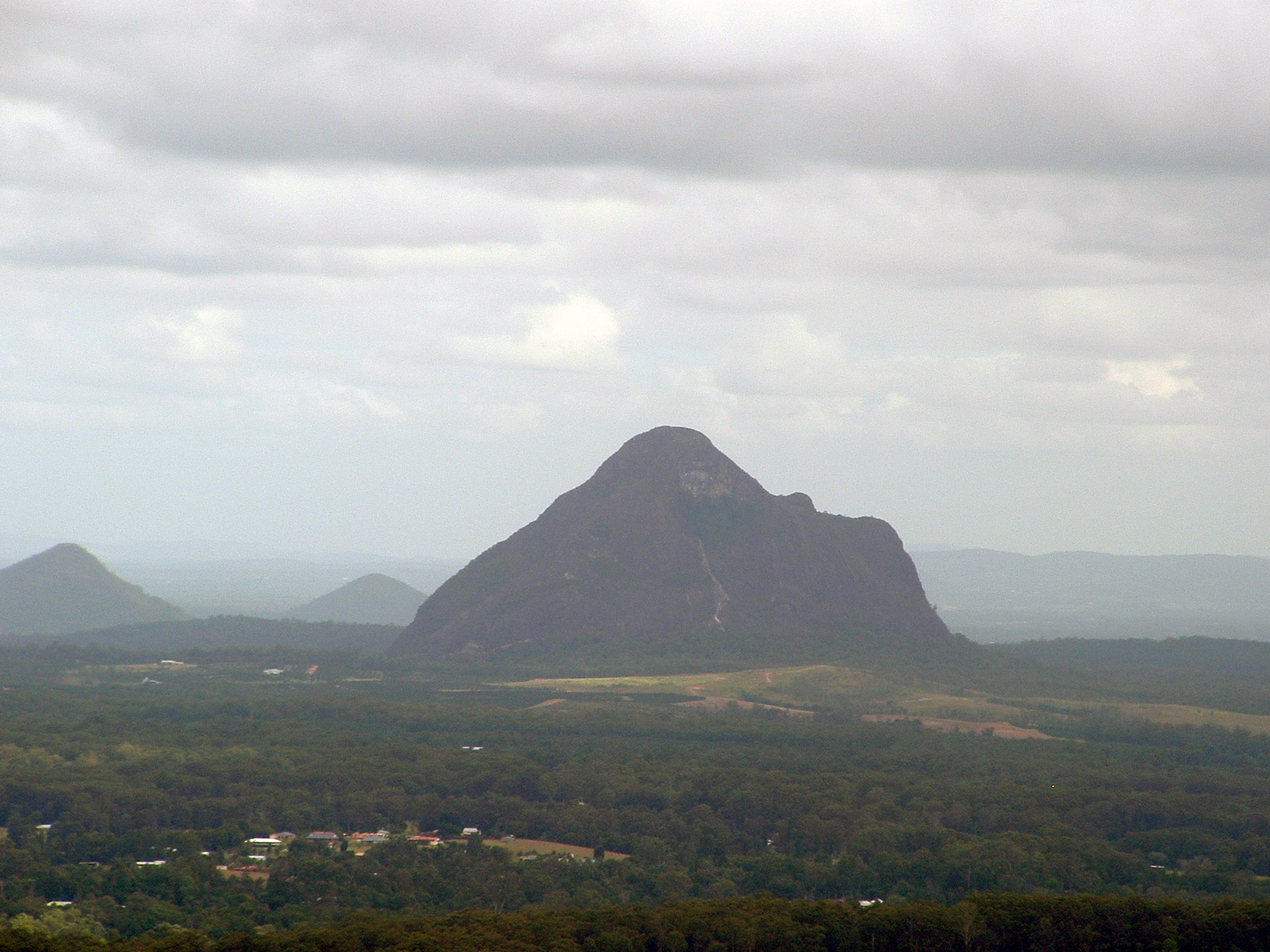
- Mount Beerwah viewed from Mary Cairncross Reserve

Highest point
- Elevation: 556 m (1,824 ft)
- Prominence: 343 m (1,125 ft)
- Coordinates: 26°54′S 152°53′E

Geography
- Location within Queensland
- Location: Queensland, Australia
- Parent range: Glass House Mountains

Geology
- Rock age: 26 million years
- Mountain type: Volcanic

Climbing
- First ascent: Andrew Petrie and John Petrie

Mount Beerwah is the highest of the ten volcanic plugs in the Glass House Mountains range, 22 kilometres (14 mi) north of Caboolture in South East Queensland, Australia. It was formed 26 million years ago during the Oligocene Epoch of the Paleogene Period. Geologists estimate it may be only a third of its original height due to intense erosion.

Mount Beerwah has two peaks, the taller of which is 556 metres (1,824 ft) high. It is one of the most visually prominent mountains in southeast Queensland. The first European settlers to ascend the peak were Andrew Petrie and his son John Petrie. Its name comes from the Dungidau language words "birra", or "sky", and "wandum", "climbing up".

In the traditional Aboriginal story of the region, Mount Beerwah is the pregnant mother and Mount Tibrogargan the father of all the other mountains in the area. The mountains are highly significant to the Jinibara people and Kabi Kabi people.

The mountain is composed almost entirely of trachyte. One side features a dramatic, overhanging cliff face known as the Organ Pipes. At its base are a number of small caves.

== Public access ==
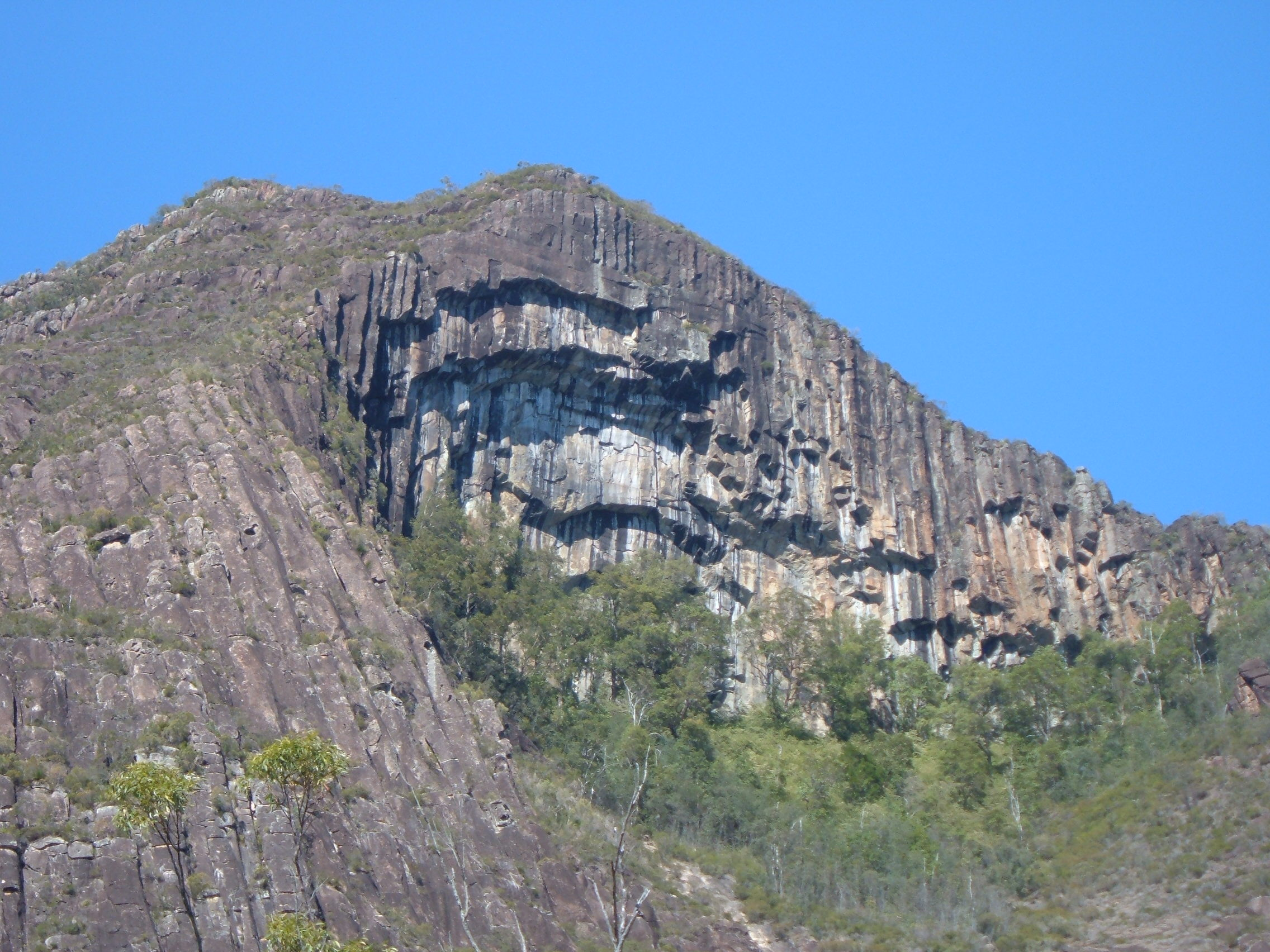
The unique overhanging rock face of Mount Beerwah

Mount Beerwah summit trail was controversially closed to climbing from 2009 to 2016, due to rock instability from bush fire. The Sunshine Coast Regional Council spent $400,000 on removing dangerous rocks and improving warning signs.

As of 2019, Mount Beerwah along with Mount Tibrogargan, Ngungun, and the rest of the mountains with tracks remain open with maintained walking trails with the exception of Mount Coonowrin (which was permanently closed to public access in March 1999 due to the high risk of rock falls that had previously killed and injured climbers).

There is a 2.6 kilometres (1.6 mi) trail up from a state government maintained parking lot. The start of the trail is a "level 5 difficulty" walk that turns into a climb that can be done without equipment. Even experienced hikers should not attempt this trail unless they have at least three hours of daylight and there is no chance of rain. Depending on fitness, climbers should plan on taking two to three litres of water per person.

== See also ==
- List of mountains in Australia
- List of volcanoes in Australia
