= Mount Ngungun =

Mountain in Australia

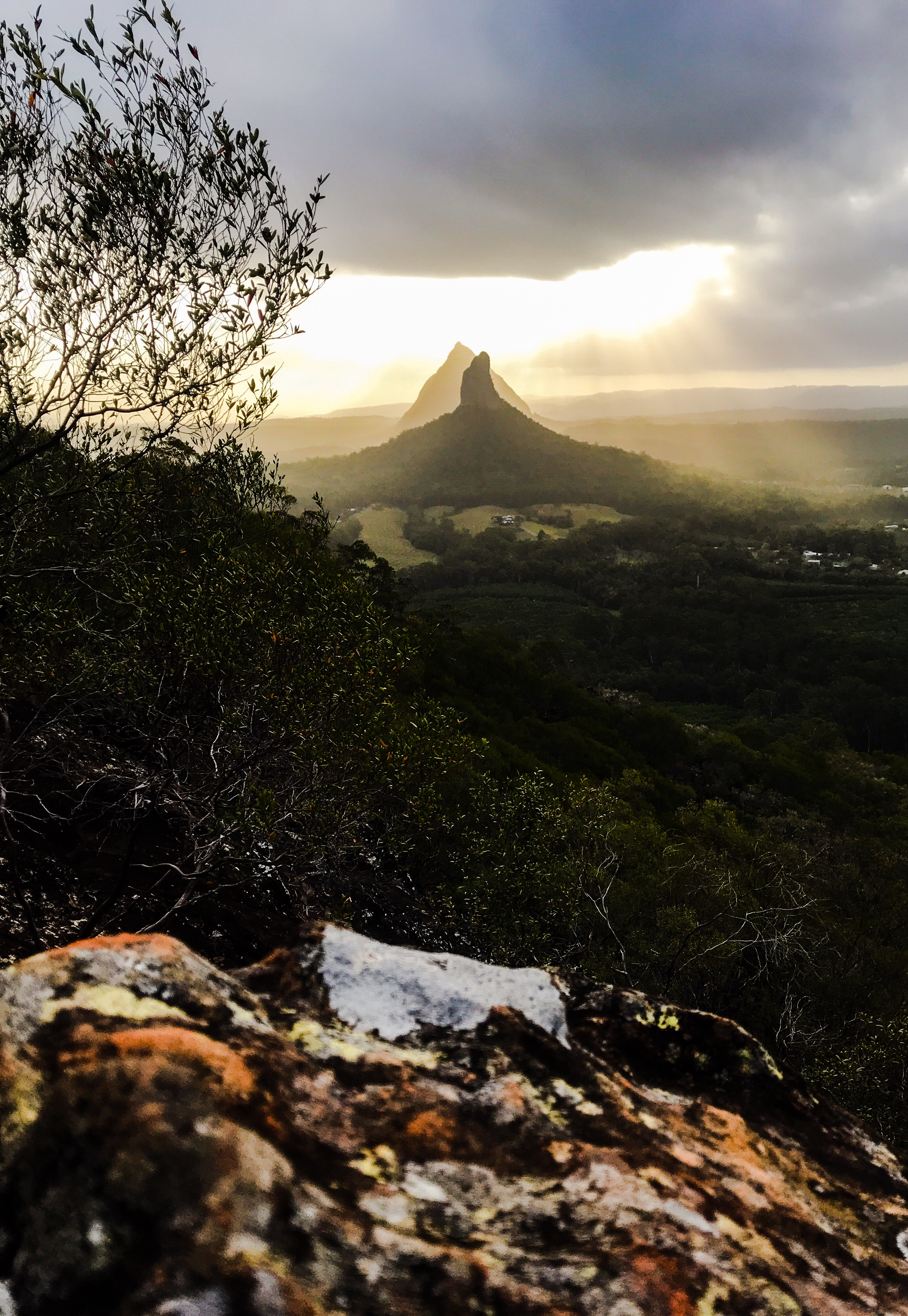
- The view from Mt Ngungun, looking towards Mt Coonowrin and Mr Beerwah.

Highest point
- Elevation: 259 m (850 ft)
- Coordinates: 26°54′S 152°56′E

Geography
- Location within Queensland
- Location: Queensland, Australia
- Parent range: Glass House Mountains

Geology
- Mountain type: Volcanic

Mount Ngungun (/nuːnuː/ NOO-noo) is the sixth tallest of the Glass House Mountains at 259 metres (850 ft).

== See also ==
- List of mountains of Australia
- Glass House Mountains
