= Mount Coonowrin =

Mountain in Queensland, Australia

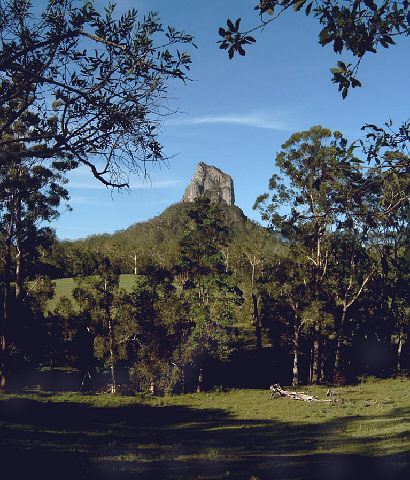
- Coonowrin is one of the more notable of the Glass House Mountains.

Highest point
- Elevation: 377 m (1,237 ft)
- Coordinates: 26°54′S 152°55′E

Geography
- Location within Queensland
- Location: Queensland, Australia
- Parent range: Glass House Mountains

Geology
- Mountain type: Volcanic

Coonowrin is one of the Glass House Mountains, located in Queensland, Australia, located 19 km north of Caboolture or about one hour's drive north of Brisbane. It is easily distinguished because of its rocky formation at the top. It is also known by its unofficial name Crookneck.

== Dreamtime mythology ==
The mountains are the subjects of several Aboriginal tales and Coonowrin is said to be the son of Tibrogargan and Beerwah. During a violent storm, Tibrogargan commanded his son Coonowrin to take his mother Beerwah and his siblings and help them move to safety. Being scared of the storm, Coonowrin instead ran off and when his father found him he hit him on the back of the head, resulting in Coonowrin's crooked neck. Tibrogargan was so ashamed of his son's cowardice that to this day he sits with his back to Coonowrin.

== Climbing ==
Coonowrin has been the site of a great amount of climbing historically. However, the mountain was permanently closed to public access in March 1999 due to the high risk of rock falls that had previously killed and injured climbers. During the 1999 geological survey of the mountain, questions were raised about the general slope stability on the north and west faces, and about individual block stability on the east and south faces.

A local woman climber was injured on the mountain after a fall sustained while descending from the summit on the south face with a male and female companion on the morning of 5 May 2013.

== See also ==
- List of mountains in Australia
- List of volcanoes in Australia
