= Penambol Conservation Park =

Protected area in South Australia

- IUCN category VI (protected area with sustainable use of natural resources)
- Location within South Australia
- Location: South Australia
- Nearest city: Mount Gambier
- Coordinates: 37°58′10″S 140°52′50″E
- Area: 1.8 km^{2} (0.69 sq mi)
- Established: 4 November 1993
- Governing body: Department for Environment and Water
- Website: Official website

Penambol Conservation Park is a protected area in the Australian state of South Australia located in the state's south-east in the gazetted locality of Caroline about 22 kilometres (14 mi) south-east of the city centre in Mount Gambier.

The conservation park occupies land in sections 382, 383, 384 and 701 of the cadastral unit of the Hundred of Caroline which is located to the north of the Glenelg River Road. The land is sections 382, 383 and 384 are bounded by Cameron Road to the west, Honeysuckle Road to the north and Carba Road to the east while the land in section 701 is located on the north side of Honeysuckle Road at the intersection with Carba Road. As of 1992, a fire water supply tank and a windmill were located in the “central section” (presumably section 383) while an airfield operated by the Department of Primary Industries and Resources South Australia was located in section 701.

The land was “acquired for conservation purposes in 1984” and was constituted as the Penambol Conservation Park under the National Parks and Wildlife Act 1972 on 4 November 1993 with access permitted for the purpose of “entry, prospecting, exploration and mining” under the Mining Act 1971 and the Petroleum Act 1940. Its name is derived from the Booandik language word recorded by the missionary, Christina Smith, for “Stringybark Forest” and was approved for the conservation park's name in 1987 over the proposed name of Pond Flat Conservation Park. As of July 2016, the conservation park covered an area of 1.8 square kilometres (0.69 sq mi).

In 1992, the conservation park was described as being located on a “consolidated inland dune system” which contains the “three significant karst features” that located in the "central section", the “south-east section” (presumably section 382) and section 701 which is described as “a large cenote (a collapsed doline), known locally as the Caroline Sinkhole”. It was described as supporting the following major vegetation associations:

1. An “open woodland” of messmate stringybark dominates most of the conservation park and supports an understorey including the following species - clover glycine, Derwent speedwell, golden-tip, hop wattle, ivy-leaved violet, rough bush-pea and tiger-orchid.
2. The “central section” which cleared for agricultural purposes prior to 1984 is dominated by introduced grass species, although native species dominated by blackwood were “beginning to regenerate in this area”.

The conservation park was also reported in 1992 as having the following “locally significant fauna” within its boundaries - bush rat, common brushtail possum, common wombat, eastern grey kangaroo, red-necked wallaby, ring tailed possum, short-beaked echidna, yellow-bellied glider and the following bird species which were listed as being “rare” in South Australia in 1992 – gang-gang cockatoo and red-tailed black cockatoo.

The conservation park is classified as an IUCN Category VI protected area.

== See also ==
- Protected areas of South Australia
