= Mount Schank =

Mountain in South Australia

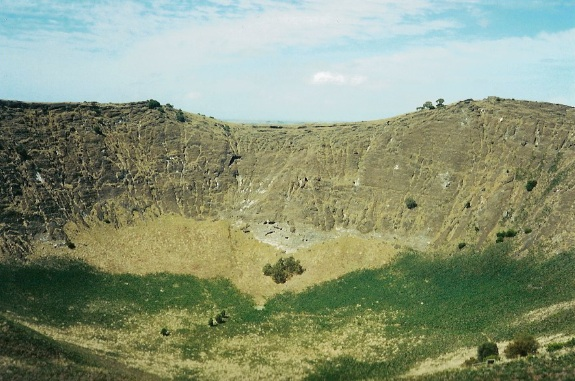
- View inside the cone from the rim

Highest point
- Elevation: 100 m (330 ft)
- Coordinates: 37°56′24″S 140°44′15″E

Geography
- Location within South Australia
- Location: Mount Schank, South Australia, Australia

Geology
- Last eruption: 4500-5000 years ago

Mount Schank is a 100 m (330 ft) high dormant volcano in the southeast corner of South Australia, near Mount Gambier. It was sighted by James Grant on 3 December 1800 and named after Admiral John Schank, designer of Grant's ship, HMS Lady Nelson.

Mount Schank is part of the Newer Volcanics Province, which is the youngest volcanic field in Australia. Mount Schank erupted about 5,000 years ago, around the same time as Mount Gambier. It is a basic ash cone and the base of the crater does not extend below the water table, so there is no crater lake as with those at Mount Gambier. There are two small subsidiary craters adjacent to the main cone and some lava flows resulting from the eruption. The northern crater is circular, 300 m (980 ft) in diameter and 100 m (330 ft) deep, the older southern crater is 200 m (660 ft) in diameter and partially overlapped by the larger crater.

The local Aboriginal Bunganditj people witnessed Mount Schank's eruptions over time. Their creation story about the local volcanic landscape was recorded by a local woman, Christina Smith, in 1880. It tells the tale of Craitbul, a giant, who was looking for a place to live with his wife and two sons. They camped at Mount Muirhead and Mount Schank, but were scared away from both these camps by a moaning bird spirit. They fled to Mount Gambier, leaving their camp ovens (the volcanoes) burning. After some time, water came and filled their ovens, putting them out and driving the spirit away. They continued to live in a cave on the side of Mount Gambier.

The site is accessible from the Riddoch Highway about 20 km (12 mi) south of Mount Gambier; there is a small carpark and picnic table, and steps have been placed to facilitate the short but very steep walk to the rim of the crater. It is a fairly simple walk to traverse the rim, though the exposed situation can be treacherous in gusty weather.

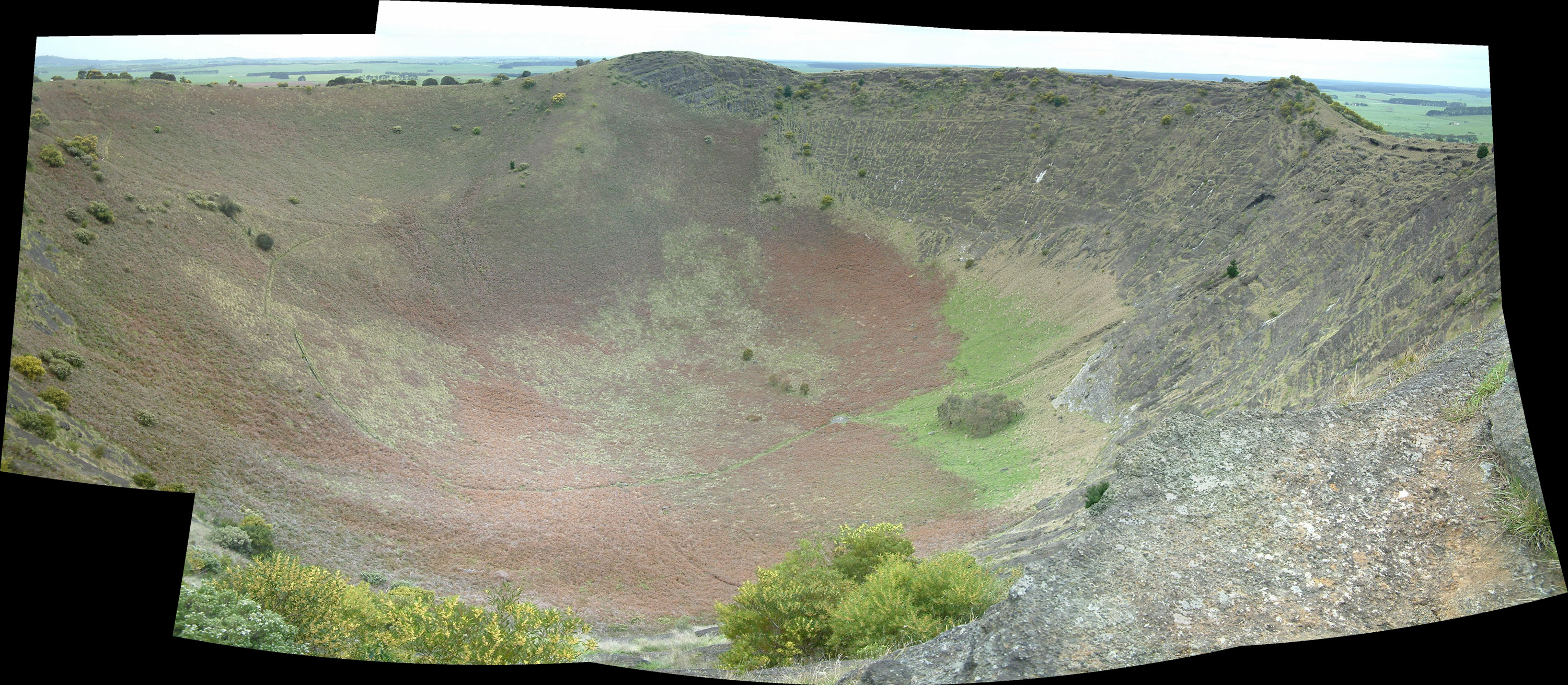
Large panorama of crater

== Spelling ==
The usual spelling of the location was "Schanck" until around 1916, when the current spelling was adopted. This may have been prompted by the then vogue for Anglicising German place-names, but the ancient Schank family, of whom the Admiral was a member, had that spelling for much of its history.

== Climate ==
Climate data for Mount Schank
Month	Jan	Feb	Mar	Apr	May	Jun	Jul	Aug	Sep	Oct	Nov	Dec	Year
Average rainfall mm	29.2	21.3	37.4	55.1	70.6	98.2	109.5	106.2	76.3	58.0	42.7	39.1	739.6
Average rainfall inches	1.15	0.84	1.47	2.17	2.78	3.87	4.31	4.18	3.00	2.28	1.68	1.54	29.12

== See also ==
- East Australia hotspot
- Kanawinka Geopark
