= Kanawinka Geopark =

- Coordinates: 37°59′31.04″S 142°0′51″E
- Country: Australia
- State: Australia
- Established: June 2008
- Abolished: 2012

Area
  - Total: 26,910 km^{2} (10,390 sq mi)

The former Kanawinka Geopark is situated along a structurally controlling geological fault of the same name that extends from the Naracoorte Caves in South Australia into Western Victoria, before disappearing offshore at Portland.

== Description ==
Kanawinka was declared Australia's First National Geopark in June 2008. It occupies a significant portion of a geological feature known as the Otway Basin (Douglas et al. 1988). Kanawinka Geopark has an area of about 26,910 square kilometres (10,390 sq mi) across two States and nine local government areas, with some 374 volcanic sites and many other significant geological sites and formations. It was deregistered from Geopark status in 2012.

The term kanawinka is taken from the language of the Buandik aboriginal peoples, the traditional owners of the land and means "Land of Tomorrow". Buandik lands stretched along the coast in the far south of modern day South Australia and across to the Victorian border regions. The geological fault line which runs from the Naracoorte area down and across into Victoria is known as the Kanawinka Fault Line and the name was also given to a parish in the Casterton/Coleraine area. As it is important in the UNESCO assessment of granting Goepark status to link geology to culture and society the name Kanawinka was chosen to represent the connection of ancient culture, European settlement and the desire to educate through the Geopark status.

The Otway Basin that hosts Kanawinka occupies the southern margin of South Australia and Victoria, and also has a significant portion located offshore. This basin formed when Australia rifted away from Gondwana (the southern supercontinent), which occurred about 95 million years ago (Drexel et al. 1993) . The sequence of sediments in the basin was deposited from Jurassic through to recent times.

The South Australian portion of the Geopark lies in the Limestone Coast of the state, and adjoins the World Heritage area of Naracoorte Caves. The Victorian part lies in the Western Districts region of that state. Both areas are famous for their cheese, wine, forestry and rural industries.

The eastern extremity of the Geopark in Victoria is located only about one hour's drive from the state capital city, Melbourne. At the Victorian/ South Australian Border the distance is about four and a half to five hours drive from Melbourne. In the South Australian section it is located four to five hours' drive from that state’s capital of Adelaide.

Volcanic activity in Victoria younger than 7 million years is known as the Newer Volcanics Province or Newer basalts. The activity in Kanawinka Geopark falls into this category. Most of the volcanism is estimated to have taken place from about 5 million years before present (B.P.) to around 5,000 years ago.

Included are 6 sites of International Significance, 14 of National significance along with many of state, regional and local significance. (Geological Survey of Australia Victorian Division and the Standing Committee on Geoheritage, National Estate listings 1980). The region varies from volcanic basalt plains dotted with eruption points through to limestone caves and crater lakes to the ‘Terra Rossa’ of the Coonawarra, with its wonderful wines.

The basalt plains of Western Victoria are listed in the top 6 in the World for extent and complexity, and the Blue Lake of Mount Gambier is of International significance with its unique colour change each year. (Sheard, M. 1978)

The Kanawinka Geopark Board was a community-based organization funded by seven of the nine local government areas and was the driving factor in the Geopark proposal. It held support of Tourism Victoria, South Australian Tourism Commission, The National Trust and the Geological Society of Australia along with the Management bodies of the Sites of Significance of the region, but failed to obtain the approval of the Victorian and South Australian Governments as well as the Australian Government. However the group has now disbanded.

== See also ==
- List of National Geoparks
- Global Geoparks Network
