= Acacia errabunda =

Conservation status
- Priority Three — Poorly Known Taxa (DEC)

Scientific classification
- Kingdom: Plantae
- Clade: Tracheophytes
- Clade: Angiosperms
- Clade: Eudicots
- Clade: Rosids
- Order: Fabales
- Family: Fabaceae
- Subfamily: Caesalpinioideae
- Clade: Mimosoid clade
- Genus: Acacia
- Species: A. errabunda

Binomial name
- Acacia errabunda Maslin
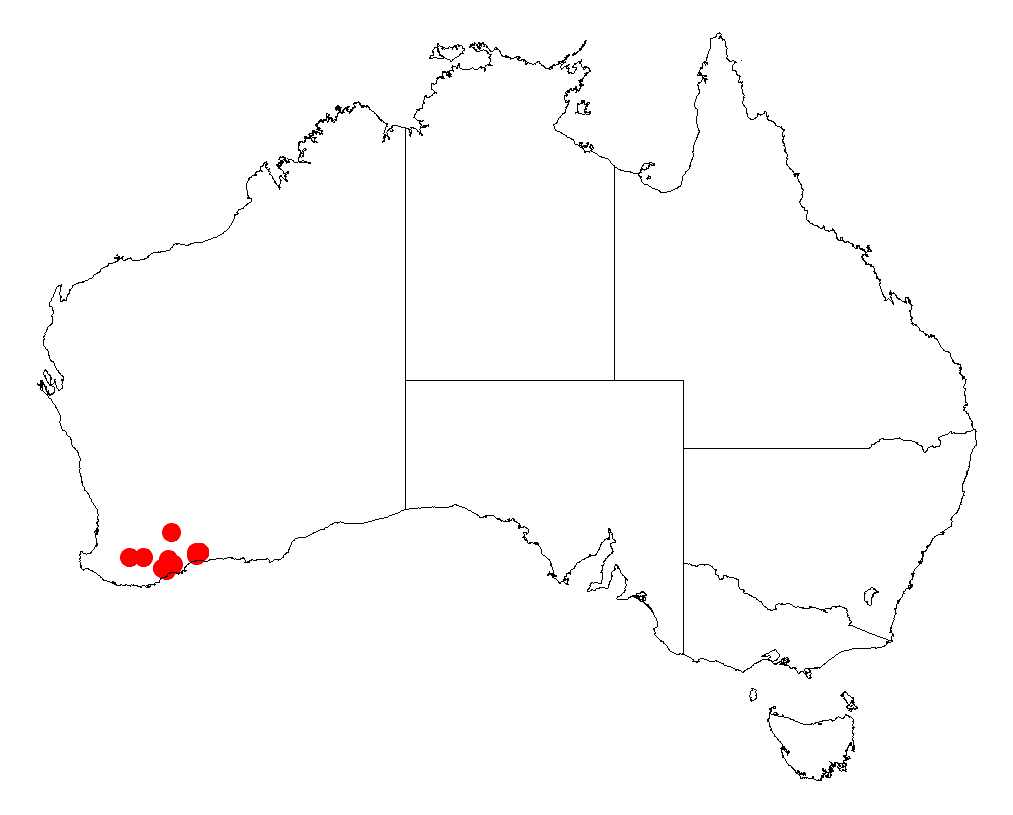
- Occurrence data from AVH

Synonyms
- Racosperma errabundum (Maslin) Pedley

Species of legume

Acacia errabunda is a species of flowering plant in the family Fabaceae and is endemic to the south-west of Western Australia. It is a spreading, rather dense, glabrous shrub with lance-shaped to linear phyllodes with the narrower end towards the base, spherical heads of light golden yellow flowers, and firmly papery, linear pods.

== Description ==
Acacia errabunda is a spreading, rather dense, glaabrous shrub that typically grows to a height of 1.0–2.5 m (3 ft 3 in – 8 ft 2 in) and has pale yellow new shoots, veins and bracteoles. Its phyllodes are lance-shaped with the narrower end towards the base or linear, straight to slightly curved, usually 20–59 mm (0.79–2.32 in) long and 3–8 mm (0.12–0.31 in) wide with one or two veins on each side. The flowers are borne in spherical heads in one or two axils, on a peduncle about 2 mm (0.079 in) long, each head with 17 to 22 light golden yellow flowers. The pods are firmly papery, linear and slightly curved, up to 90 mm (3.5 in) long and 3.5 mm (0.14 in) wide. The seeds are oblong, 4 mm (0.16 in) long, shiny dark brown with an orange-brown aril on the end.

== Taxonomy ==
Acacia errabunda was first formally described in 1999 by the botanist Bruce Maslin in the journal Nuytsia from specimens collected by Kenneth Newbey 4 km (2.5 mi) east of Needilup in 1975. The most closely related species is A. stricta. The specific epithet (errabunda) is derived from Latin "erro" meaning 'to wander' and "bundus" indicating 'something in progress or completed', referring to the veins of the phyllodes.

== Distribution and habitat ==
This species of wattle grows on undulating plains and clay pans in clay, loam, gravelly loam or sand in woodland, mallee and shrubland near Broomehill, Jerramungup and Ravensthorpe in the Avon Wheatbelt, Esperance Plains and Mallee bioregions of south-western Western Australia.

== Conservation status ==
Acacia errabunda is listed as "Priority Three" by the Government of Western Australia, Department of Biodiversity, Conservation and Attractions, meaning that it is poorly known and known from only a few locations but is not under imminent threat.

== See also ==
- List of Acacia species
