= Meintangk =

Meintangk may refer to:

- Meintangk people
- Meintangk language
