= Newer Volcanics Province =

Volcanic field in Australia

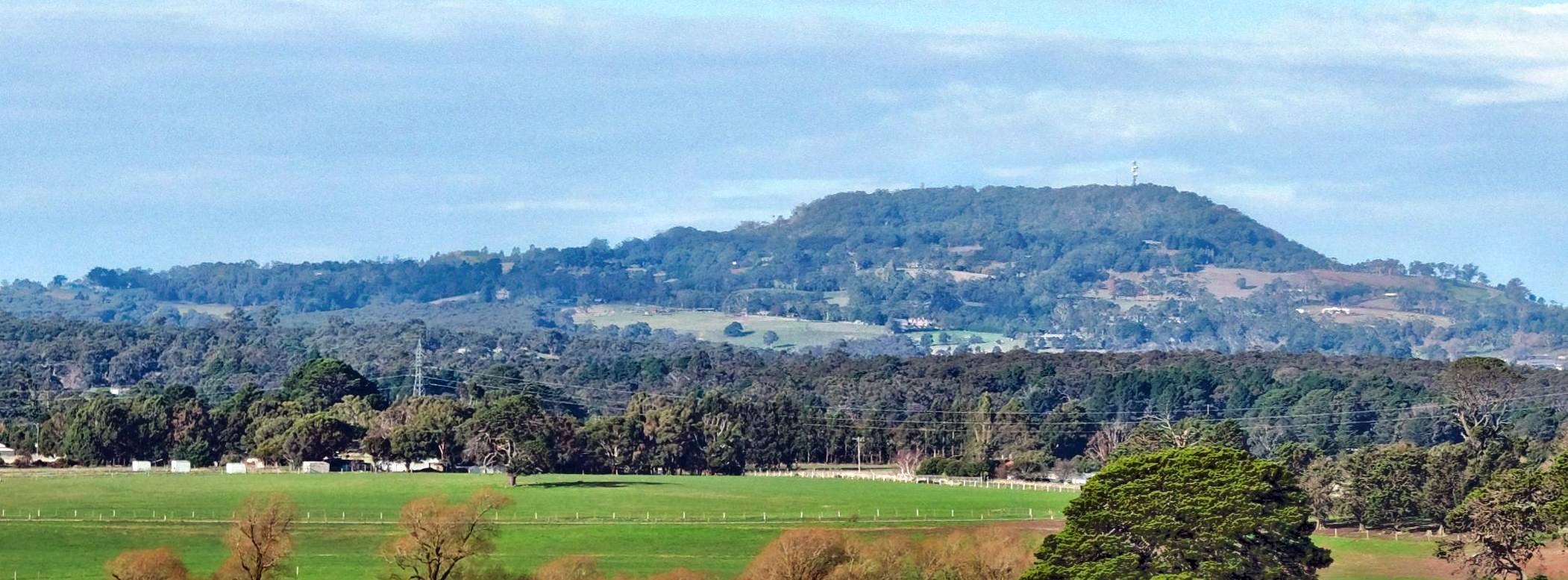
- Mount Buninyong, the highest peak in the Newer Volcanics Province.

Highest point
- Elevation: 745 m (2,444 ft)
- Coordinates: 37°39′S 143°56′E

Geography
- Location: Victoria and South Australia, Australia

Geology
- Mountain type: Volcanic field / Cinder cones / Maars / Crater lakes
- Last eruption: Holocene

Climbing
- First ascent: BCE

The Newer Volcanics Province is a geological area which is a volcanic field, formed by the East Australia hotspot across south-eastern Australia. It covers an area of 15,000 square kilometres (5,800 sq mi), with over 400 small shield volcanoes and volcanic vents. The area contains the youngest volcanoes in Australia.

The volcanoes date from the Late-Pleistocene to Holocene ages. The area is characterised by flat lava flows, forming a plain above which rise numerous small scoria cones, tuff rings, and maars. The most recent eruptions in the region took place at Mount Schank and Mount Gambier, estimated about 5000 years BP, when several maars were formed and associated lava flows spread around the cones.

== Volcanoes ==
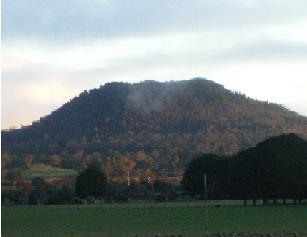
Mount Napier

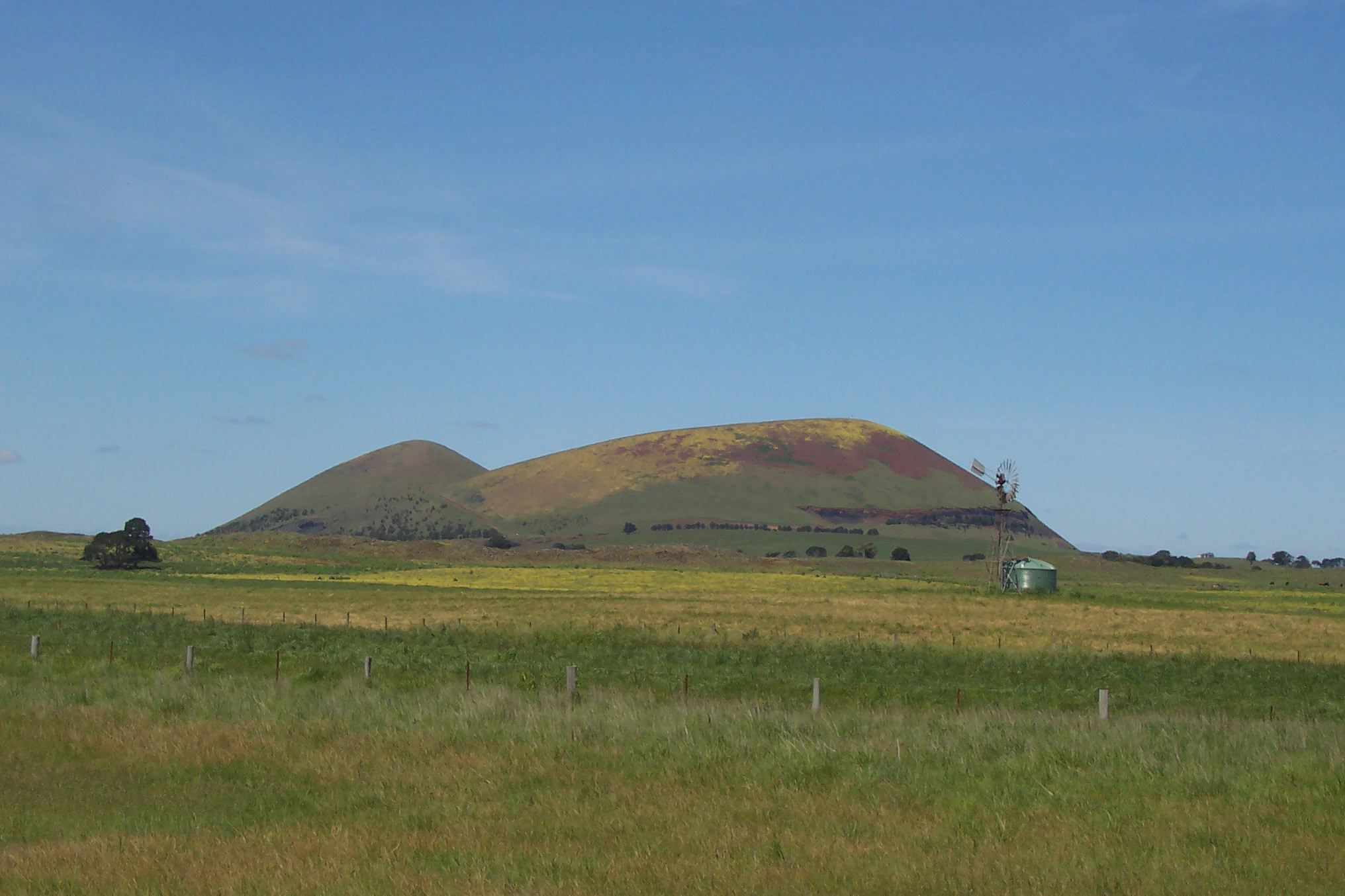
Mount Elephant viewed from Derrinallum, Oct. 2010

Prominent volcanoes within the province include:

- Mount Schank
- Mount Napier
- Mount Gambier (including Blue Lake)
- Tower Hill
- Mount Elephant
- Mount Eccles (Budj Bim), with associated Tyrendarra lava flow
- Mount Leura
- Mount Noorat
- Mount Buninyong
- Lake Bullen Merri
- Lake Purrumbete
- Red Rock

== Aboriginal Dreamtime connections ==
History

Three groups of Aboriginal Australians, the Kulin nation in central and western Victoria, the Maar nation on the southwest coast of Victoria and the Bunganditj nation on the South Australian border with Victoria, are the traditional owners of the lands that the NVP is situated on. These Indigenous Australians tell Dreamtime stories regarding volcanic activity on the Australian continent. These stories act as oral histories of natural events, and can be utilised by modern scientists to understand historical geological and seismic activity on the continent.

Budj Bim

The Gunditjmara people retell the story of their people who witnessed the creation of an important being known as Budj Bim, one of four giant beings who arrived in southeast Australia. While three of these beings strode out to other parts of the continent, one stayed in place; that was Budj Bim. His body transformed into the volcano later given the same name, and his teeth became the lava that transformed the landscape.

Theories and Disagreements

In 1878, Robert B. Smyth, a mining engineer and geologist, raised a question on how Aboriginal Australians get fire. He agreed that there were active volcanoes in Victoria; however, he claimed that there was uncertainty as to whether people actually inhabited that land. However, it was later proven that Smyth had an incomplete idea of Australia's geological past.

== See also ==
- Budj Bim heritage areas
- List of volcanoes in Australia
