= Bungandidj people =

Aboriginal Australian group

Bungandidj
Total population
- unknown

Regions with significant populations

Languages
- Bungandidj language, Australian English

Religion
- Australian Aboriginal mythology, Christianity

Related ethnic groups
- Ngarrindjeri, Dhauwurd wurrung, Bindjali, and Jardwadjali see List of Indigenous Australian group names

The Bungandidj people are an Aboriginal Australian people from the Mount Gambier region in south-eastern South Australia, and also in western Victoria. Their language is the Bungandidj language. Bungandidj was historically frequently rendered as Boandik, Buandig, or Booandik.

== History ==
=== Prehistory ===
The territory of not only the Bunganndidj but also their neighbours the Meintangk, has been revealed, by archaeological explorations, to have been inhabited for some 30,000 years. Coastal occupation around the Robe and Cape Banks attests that habitation from, at a low estimate, 5,800 BP.

Their name comes from Bung-an-ditj, meaning "people of the reeds", which indicates their connection to land and water.

=== First contact ===
First contact between the Bungandidj and Europeans occurred in the early 1820s. Pantji from the Bungandidj recounted to Christina Smith the story of the first sighting of ships at Rivoli Bay in either 1822 or 1823, and his mother's abduction for three months before she was able to escape when the ship put in at Guichen Bay.

When Governor George Grey led an expedition of surveyors, overland from Adelaide to Mt Gambier during April–May 1844, the diarist and painter George French Angas who accompanied them, noted that they found, from Woakwine Range onwards, numerous native tracks, and old encampments with abandoned wurleys, and heaps of banksia cones, which were used to make sweet drinks, mud weirs in swamps to catch fish, wicker-work traps to snare birds, and raised platform structures for spotting emus and kangaroos to hunt.

=== Conflict and dispossession ===
In November 1834 Edward Henty settled near Portland, starting the movement of European settlers and their sheep, cattle, horses and bullocks across the Western plains of Victoria and the south east region of South Australia. Settlement occurred rapidly over the following two decades with significant frontier conflict taking place involving theft of sheep, spearings, massacres and mass poisoning of the natives. Grey's expedition reported encountering very few indigenous people, no more than groups of two or three. The abundance of signs of previous native land use with the scarcity of sighted natives was explained as due to the smallpox, introduced by Europeans in the north, which has spread out, after devastating the Murray tribes and decimated Aboriginal people further south.

There are a number of reports of poisoned flour or damper being given or left for natives in the settlement of Victoria and South Australia at the time. According to the accounts given by Pendowen, Neenimin and Barakbouranu, and narrated to Christina Smith:

"We tasted the mutton, and found it very good; but we buried the damper, as we were afraid of being poisoned."

In 1843 Henry Arthur joined his brother Charles in establishing a sheep run at Mount Schank. Trouble with Buandig people and dingoes, however, drove the Arthur brothers to sell up in 1844. The Hentys also had problems with their Mount Gambier sheep runs with theft of their sheep and shepherds speared to death in 1844. Such heavy losses occurred that the Hentys were forced to withdraw all their flocks from the Mount Gambier run.The Leake brothers on their Glencoe Station also reported problems losing 1,000 sheep from their 16,000 flock during 1845. Hostilities are reported to have continued around the Glenelg River region for the next two years.

Mistreatment of Aboriginal people was at a level in 1845 where the commissioner of police drew attention to the atrocious treatment in the Rivoli Bay District:

"... damper poisoned with corrosive sublimate … [and] driving the Natives from the only watering places in the neighbourhood. The Native women appear likewise to have been sought after by the shepherds, whilst the men were driven from the stations with threats".

In 1848, the Avenue Range Station massacre occurred in the Guichen Bay region of South Australia. At least 9 indigenous Bungandidj Wattatonga clan people were allegedly murdered by the station owner James Brown who was subsequently charged with the crime. The case was dropped by the Crown for lack of European witnesses. Until that year, blacks were unable to testify under oath. Christina Smith's source from the Wattatonga tribe refers to 11 people killed in this incident by two white men. The cause of the massacre was the theft of sheep for food.

A report by Mr Smith to Dr Moorhouse, the Protector of Aborigines, in April 1851 reveals that "the natives belonging to the Rivoli Bay Tribe (Buandig) are all quiet, and most of them usefully employed in one way or another by the settlers." The report also raises with concern that "infanticide has been and is still practised among the natives here.", and "relations existing between native woman and the Europeans are very discreditable."

As late as 1854, settlers on Bungandidj land still expressed fears of being attacked. The Leake Brothers of Glencoe Station built what they called their 'Frontier House' in 1854 which is described as a 'large homestead with slits in the walls through which rifles could be used against any likely intruder,' according to local historian Les Hill.

Gradually a certain accommodation was made with Buandig people working as station hands, shearers and domestic servants while remaining on their own land.

According to Bell and Marsden, Aboriginal people made wurley encampments on the edge of Kingston and even moved into cottages at Rosetown on Kingston's northern side in 1877. The people often moved camp seasonally gathering and using traditional foods and using the traditional local burial ground. They record that the Blackford Reserve on the Bordertown Road was another locality where Aboriginal people lived until the 1970s. Kingston and Bordertown were the territorial border shared between the Buandig and the Ngarrindjeri.

== Today ==
There are many people in the region who identify as Bungandidj today. Descendants of the Bungandidj and the Meintangk continue to nurture and protect their culture through the Kungari Aboriginal Cultural Association based in Kingston SE.

In 2022 many of the landmarks around Mount Gambier, including the lakes of the dormant volcano known as Mount Gambier, have been dual-named with Bungadidj names. The town of Mount Gambier is as of October 2022 not yet dual-named, but is being signposted "Berrin / Mount Gambier", Berrin being the name by which the town is known to its present-day Indigenous inhabitants. The names include:

- Blue Lake / Warwar, meaning "crow country", or "the sound of many crows"
- Leg of Mutton Lake / Yatton Loo (unknown meaning)
- Brownes Lake / Kroweratwari, meaning "emus, [or] their tracks"
- Valley Lake / Ketla Malpi, meaning "sacred talking tree"
- Umpherston Sinkhole / Balumbul, meaning "buttercup flower
- Cave Garden / Thugi, meaning "bullfrogs

== Country ==
According to Christina Smith in her 1880 book on the Bungandidj – The Boandik Tribe of South Australian Aborigines: A Sketch of Their Habits, Customs, Legends, and Language -

"The aborigines of the South-East were divided into five tribes, each occupying its own territory, and using different dialects of the same language. Their names were Booandik, Pinejunga, Mootatunga, Wichintunga, and Polinjunga."

The largest clan, according to Smith, was the Bungandidj who occupied country from the mouth of the Glenelg River to Rivoli Bay North (Beachport), extending inland for about 30 miles (48 km). Some controversy exists as to which tribe, the Bungandidj or Meintangk, occupied the stretch of land between Rivoli Bay and Cape Jaffa, and in particular which of the two was in possession of the Woakwine Range. The other clans occupied country from between Lacepede Bay to Bordertown. The Bungandidj shared tribal borders with the Ngarrindjeri people of the Coorong and Murray mouth to the west, the Bindjali and Jardwadjali to the north and the Gunditjmara people to the east.

Anthropologist Norman Tindale argued in 1940 and again in 1974 that at the time of European settlement the Bungandidj were under territorial pressure from the Jardwadjali people to the north forcing the Bungandidj territorial boundary south from Gariwerd towards present day Casterton. However the historian Ian D. Clark has challenged Tindale's conclusions, arguing that the ethnohistoric and linguistic evidence does not support Tindale's claims regarding the boundaries between the Bungandidj and Jardwadjali. (Note: 'These leave no doubt that Jardwadjali 'is spoken about Horsham, Murtoa, Kewell, Warracknabeal, southerly to Grampians, Balmoral, Cavendish and Coleraine'. Thus, Mathews has included a large portion of territory that Tindale delineated as Buandig.' (Smith 1880, p. 15))

== Social organisation ==
The Bungandidj were divided into two marriage classes: Kumite and Kroke, with children being assigned their mother's class. Within the Kumite class there were five major animal totems

- boorte moola: fishhawk
- boorte parangal: pelican
- boorte wa: crow
- boorte willer: black cockatoo
- boorte karato: (harmless) snake

The Kroke class had four major totems:

- boorte wirrmal: owl
- boorte wsereoo: teatree scrub
- boorte moorna: an edible root
- boorte kara-al: white crestless cockatoo

Each of these divisions had many animals, plants, and inanimate elements correlated with it. These totemic items were treated as the friend of all members of a totemic clan, and restrictions were imposed on eating species associated with them, except under extreme circumstances when due sorrow and remorse was expressed.

The southerly groups appeared to have a migratory cycle consisting of setting up camps for fishing in the south over the warmer seasons, and then, with the onset of winter, leaving the stormy coasts to hunt and fish inland. Later reports describe their housing arrangements, of mud-daubed wurlies more comfortable than the shepherds' huts later constructed by pastoralists.

== Language ==
The Bungandidj language is a Pama-Nyungan language, and is classified as belonging to the Bungandidj/Kuurn-Kopan-Noot subgroup of the Victorian Kulin languages. Their own name for their language was Drualat-ngolonung (speech of man), or, alternatively, Booandik-ngolo (speech of the Bungandidj). It consisted of 5 known dialects, Bungandidj, Pinejunga, Mootatunga, Wichintunga and Polinjunga. It has recently been studied by Barry Blake.

Related vocabulary in Bungandidj includes: drual (man); barite (girl); moorongal (boy); and ngat (mother).

=== Some words ===
- kooraa ((male) kangaroo)
- kal/karl (tame dog)
- kar na chum (wild dog)
- marm (father)
- ngate (mother)
- koomamir (white man)

== Alternative names ==
Given the range of early interactions and encounters with the Bungandidj people, several demonyms and orthographies exist:

- Barconedeet, Bak-on-date
- Booandik-ngolo
- Buanditj, Boandik, Buandic, Booandik, Bangandidj, Buandik, Buandic, Boandiks
- Bunganditjngolo (name for a language) (Borandikngolo is a misprint)
- Bungandity, Bungandaitj, Bungandaetch, Bungandaetcha
- Drualat-ngolonung
- Nguro (Mt Gambier dialect, of eastern tribes)
- Pungandaitj, Pungantitj, Pungandik
- Smoky River tribe

== In the arts ==
Bob Maza's play The Keepers was about the dispossession of the Buandig people. It was performed several times in 1988, including in Naracoorte by Mainstreet Theatre and at the Adelaide Fringe Festival by Troupe Theatre, both directed by Geoff Crowhurst, and at Belvoir Street Theatre in Sydney, starring Lillian Crombie and Danny Adcock, and directed by Maza. Maza won the National Black Playwright Award for the production.

== Sources ==
- Aboriginal History. City Council of Robe.
- Angas, George French (1847). Savage life and scenes in Australia and New Zealand: being an artist's impressions of countries and people at the Antipodes (PDF). Vol. 1, 2. London: Smith, Elder & Co – via Internet Archive.
- Bell, Peter; Marsden, Susan (2008). Kingston SE – An Overview. Kingston District Council.
- Blake, Barry (2003). The Bunganditj (Buwandik) Language of the Mount Gambier Region. Research School of Pacific and Asian Studies, Australian National University. ISBN 978-0-858-83495-8.
- Clark, Ian D. (1995). Scars in the Landscape: a register of massacre sites in western Victoria, 1803–1859 (PDF). AIATSIS. pp. 169–175. ISBN 0-85575-281-5.
- Clark, Ian D. (November 1998). Understanding the Enemy - Ngamadjid or Foreign Invader? Aboriginal perception of Europeans in Nineteenth Century Western Victoria. Faculty of Business and Economics Working Paper 73/98. pp. 1=25.
- Dixon, Robert M. W. (2004) [First published 2002]. Australian Languages: Their Nature and Development. Vol. 1. Cambridge University Press. pp. 169–175. ISBN 978-0-521-47378-1.
- Fort, Carol (2005). 'Doing' history and 'Understanding' Cultural Landscapes: Cutting Through South Australia's Woakwine Range (PDF). pp. 1–17.
- Foster, Robert; Nettelbeck, Amanda (2012). Out of the Silence: The History and Memory of South Australia's Frontier Wars. Wakefield Press. ISBN 978-1-743-05172-6.
- Foster, Robert; Nettelbeck, Amanda; Hosking, Rick (2001). Fatal Collisions: The South Australian Frontier and the Violence of Memory. Wakefield Press. ISBN 978-1-862-54533-5.
- Hill, Les R. (1972). Mount Gambier, The City around a Cave: A regional History. Adelaide: Openbook Publishers.
- Jenkin, Graham (1979). Conquest of the Ngarrindjeri. Rigby. ISBN 978-0-727-01112-1.
- "The Keepers: Belvoir Street Theatre, Surry Hills, NSW: 25 May 1988". The Australian Live Performance Database. 1988.
- "The Keepers: Troupe Theatre, Unley, SA. Adelaide Fringe 1988". The Australian Live Performance Database. 1988.
- Macgillivray, Leith (1989). "'We Have Found Our Paradise': the South-East squattocracy, 1840–1870" (DOC). Journal of the Historical Society of South Australia. 17: 25–38.
- Smith, Mrs James (1880). The Booandik Tribe of South Australian Aborigines: A Sketch of Their Habits, Customs, Legends and Language. Adelaide: E Spiller Government Printer – via Internet Archive.
- Stewart, D. (1887). "Mount Gambier" (PDF). In Curr, Edward Micklethwaite (ed.). The Australian race: its origin, languages, customs, place of landing in Australia and the routes by which it spread itself over the continent. Vol. 3. Melbourne: J. Ferres. pp. 460–465 – via Internet Archive.
- Tindale, Norman Barnett (1974). "Bunganditj (SA)". Aboriginal Tribes of Australia: Their Terrain, Environmental Controls, Distribution, Limits, and Proper Names. Australian National University Press. ISBN 978-0-708-10741-6.
- Van Straten, Frank (2007). "Bob Maza AM 1939 – 2000". Live Performance Australia.
