= Valley Lake / Ketla Malpi =

Volcanic crater lake in South Australia

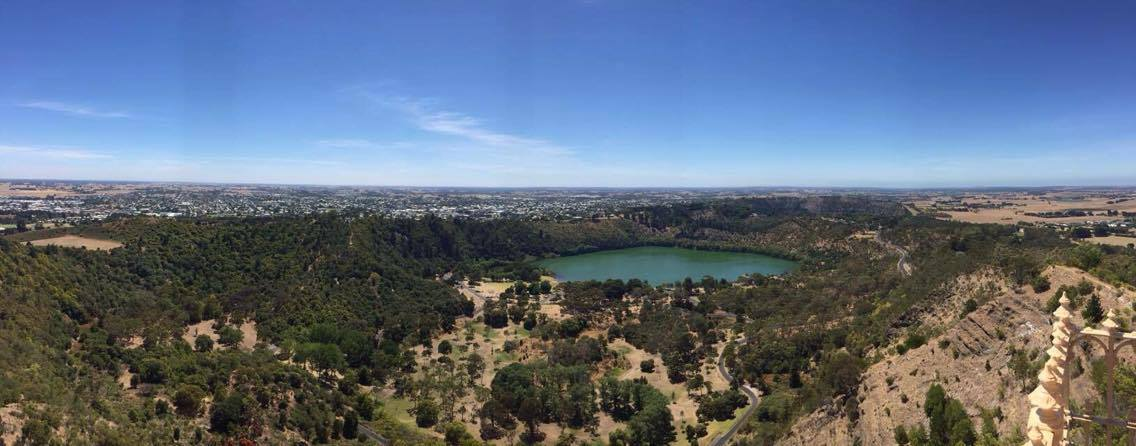
- Panorama of the Valley Lake in 2016

- Location in South Australia
- Location: Mount Gambier, South Australia
- Coordinates: 37°50′25″S 140°46′1″E
- Type: Monomictic Volcanic crater lake
- Basin countries: Australia
- Surface area: 26 ha (64 acres)
- Islands: None
- Settlements: None

Valley Lake / Ketla Malpi is a monomictic volcanic crater lake in the Australian state of South Australia situated in the south of Mount Gambier, near Blue Lake / Warwar. It is within Valley Lake Conservation Park.

== History ==
The Boandik (or Bungandidj) people occupied the area before the colonisation of South Australia.

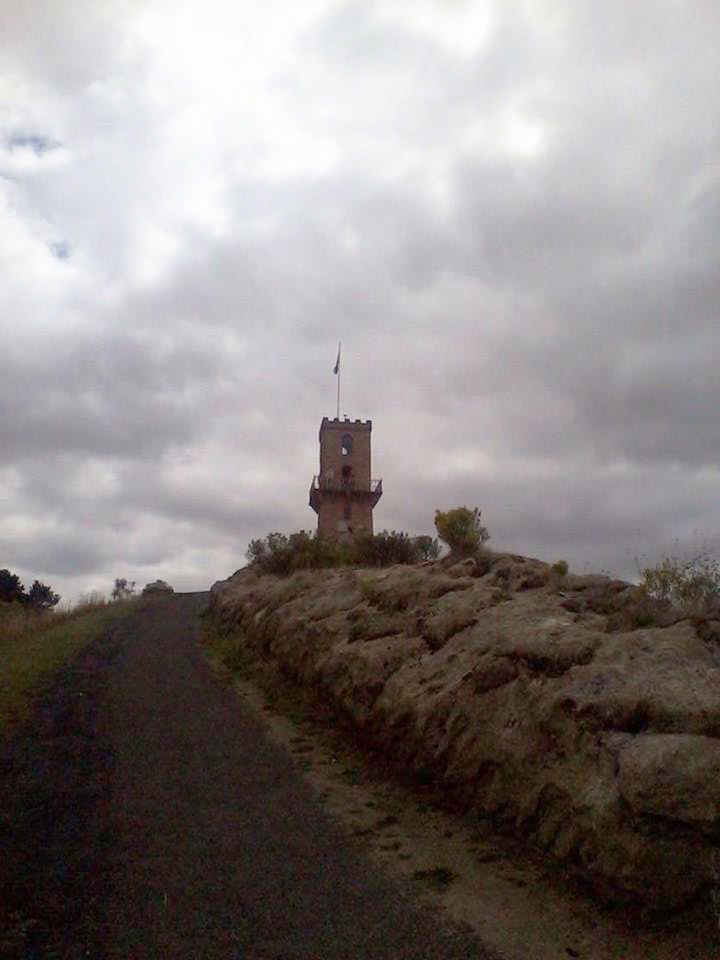
Centenary Tower (2013)

When Stephen Henty of Portland happened upon the dormant Mount Gambier volcano in 1839, the Valley Lake and the Blue Lake were considered a good source of water for future settlers in the new colony of South Australia.

The foundation stone for the Centenary Tower was laid on 3 December 1900 (to commemorate the 100th anniversary of the sighting and naming of Mount Gambier), and was officially opened in 1904. The tower sits 190 m (620 ft) above sea level, and its opening hours are signified by a flag flown above the tower. At night the tower is lit up and can be viewed from the city.

On 26 February 1954 Queen Elizabeth II visited the Valley Lake as part of her Australian tour. A plaque commemorating this visit was placed at the Valley Lake Lookout in 1977.

== Description ==
Valley Lake / Ketla Malpi is one of four lakes in the dormant volcano complex. Sites of cultural significance to the Boandik people were assigned dual names by the City of Mount Gambier in February 2022, and the renaming included the four lakes in the Bungandidj language. Valley Lake became Valley Lake / Ketla Malpi, with the second name meaning "sacred talking tree".

The lake is surrounded by a park situated on Davidson Drive. The shore of the lake features a children's playground, sporting facilities, BBQs and toilets. There is also a Conservation Park, as well as Centenary Tower at the top of the surrounding crater.

The Valley Lake Conservation Park operates within the Valley Lake park. The park is home to a number of indigenous flora and fauna species. It also features lookouts, a boardwalk and a number of nature walks.
