= Cave Garden / Thugi =

Garden in Mount Gambier, South Australia

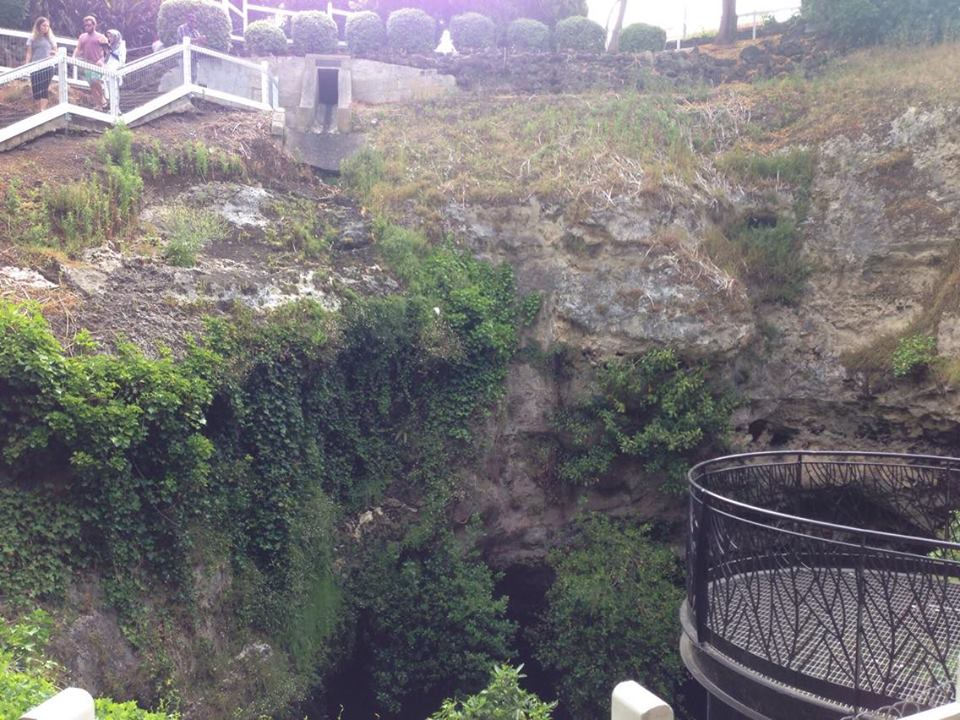
- Cave Gardens from viewing platform (2016)

- Location within South Australia
- Location: Mount Gambier, South Australia, Australia
- Coordinates: 37°49′45″S 140°46′50″E
- Depth: 27 metres (89 ft)
- Discovery: 1845

Cave Garden / Thugi, formerly known as the Cave Gardens, is a garden located in the centre of Mount Gambier, South Australia, that contains a 30 m (98 ft) deep cave. The cave was initially used as a water source for the town.

== History ==
The Boandik (or Bungandidj) people occupied the area before the colonisation of South Australia.

The cave that the garden surrounds was found by Europeans during the 1845-46 survey of the area, with the fresh water supply in the cave being an attraction that initiated the first settlement of the area. The 3 acres (1.2 ha) surrounding the area was declared government reserve. The main water supply of Mount Gambier remained the sinkhole until the 1850s. The first buildings of Mount Gambier (the first post office, the Town Hall, and a hotel) were built surrounding this reserve.

In 1870 the area became a reserve, and by the 1890s trees, gas lamps and seating were installed in the area. On 2 August 2001, the Cave Gardens were declared a state heritage area.

In the 1890s the first plants and seating were added to the area, and the formal garden was constructed between 1906 and 1910.

In 1922, a captured German gun from WWI was added to the garden, however this was later removed. A large flagstaff was displayed in the garden for 40 years until on 1 January 1926 it fell, however no one was injured. The garden also featured a 'model' air raid shelter in 1942 for householders to view, thought its use was never necessary.

The garden, as one of several culturally significant sites in the area, was renamed with a dual name by the City of Mount Gambier in February 2022, with its new name being Cave Garden / Thugi. Thugi means "bullfrogs" in the Bungandidj language.

== Description ==
The gardens now feature a scenic walk, as well as a lowered viewing platform into the sinkhole. The floor of the cave is not accessible. In wet weather, the drains at the top of the sinkhole create a waterfall that flows into the cave.

== Dangers ==
In 1878, when the cave floor was still submerged in water, a young man committed suicide by drowning himself in the water.

In October 2005, a 21-year-old man was seriously injured after losing his footing while trying to get a closer look at the sinkhole. In February 2020, a 20-year-old man fell approximately 30 m (98 ft) to the base of the sinkhole and died.

Though the cave floor is no longer accessible, people have made attempts to enter it. In August 2011, two men lowered themselves into the cave. One became injured after trying to climb out and falling. Both men were eventually removed from the cave and taken into police custody.
