= East Australia hotspot =

Volcanic province in southeast Australia

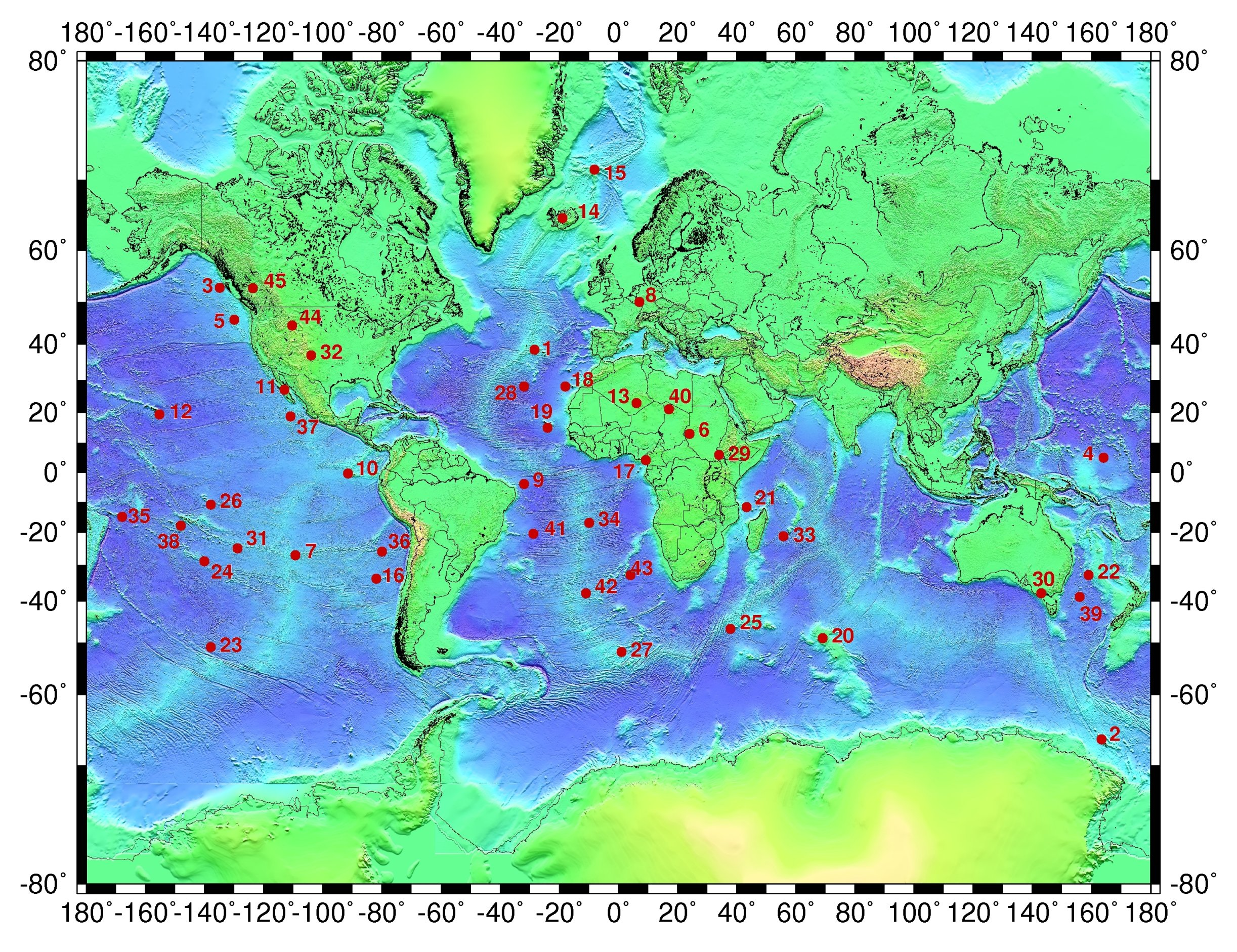
Map of hotspots. The East Australia hotspot is marked 30 on map.

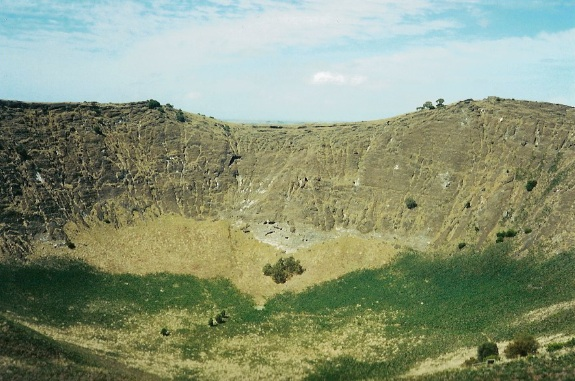
View inside the crater of Mount Schank from the rim

The East Australia hotspot (which is now believed by some scientists to represent multiple hotspots including a southwestern Cosgrove hotspot) is a volcanic province in southeast Australia which includes the Peak Range in central Queensland, the Main Range on the Queensland-New South Wales border, Tweed Volcano in New South Wales, and the Newer Volcanics Province (NVP) in Victoria and South Australia. A number of the volcanoes in the province have erupted since Aboriginal settlement (46,000 BP). The most recent eruptions were about 5,600 years ago, and memories of them survive in Aboriginal folklore. These eruptions formed the volcanoes Mount Schank and Mount Gambier in the NVP. There have been no eruptions on the Australian mainland since European settlement.

Unlike most hotspots, the East Australia hotspot has had explosive eruptions similar to the runny lava flows of the Hawaii hotspot, the Iceland hotspot and the Réunion hotspot. The hotspot is thought to be explosive because basaltic magma interacts with groundwater in aquifers below the surface producing violent phreatomagmatic eruptions.

The cause of volcanism in the area is uncertain. Theories typically fall into one of two categories: the mantle plume theory and the plate theory. On the basis of the long duration of volcanic activity, its vast lateral extent, geochemistry of lavas, and seismic data, it has been proposed that the region is underlain by one or more deep mantle plumes which have forced magma up through points of weakness in the Indo-Australian Plate as it has moved northward over the source.

The lack of clear age progression across the province and the orientation of the NVP, which is orthogonal to plate motion, are inconsistent with a single plume model. Furthermore, seismic anomalies terminate at a depth of around 200 km, making the presence of a mantle plume unlikely. However subsections of the province such as the bimodal Central Volcanoes have definite linear age progression on the Hillsborough to Buckland lineament and the Fraser to Comboyne lineament. Similarly the Cenozoic leucitite volcanics of eastern Australia, some of which are under thicker continental crust than the coastal volcanics, are progressively younger towards the south, from Byrock in northern NSW to Cosgrove in northern Victoria. This is now interpreted as the Cosgrove hotspot and has been extended southward to the Macedon-Trentham central volcano and the Newer Volcanics Province lava field in Victoria.

Various tectonic causes have been proposed. Some studies have argued that volcanic activity results from a combination of edge-driven convection (small-scale, shallow mantle convection caused by a change in lithospheric thickness at the continental margin where thick continental lithosphere meets thinner oceanic lithosphere) and decompression of the crust from normal faulting caused by plate stresses. Another view is that extension from stresses brought about by changes in plate boundary configurations has caused severe lithospheric thinning resulting in decompression melting of the asthenosphere. Both of these models invoke shallow processes closely related to the operation of plate tectonics and so fall under the plate theory. Other models combine both plume and plate-tectonic processes. A 2022 synthesis, based on age and composition, suggests three different processes exist for the Cenozoic volcanoes found in eastern Australia and some are not hot spot volcanoes:

1. Oceanic type, high volume, age-progressive volcanism from deep mantle plume(s)
2. Continental, age progressive volcanism some from the same plume(s) mixed with different melts
3. Continental, low volume, non-age-progressive volcanism related to passive melting.

== See also ==
- List of volcanoes in Australia
- Hawai'i hotspot
