= Tower Hill, Victoria =

Locality in LGA, Victoria, Australia

Tower Hill
- Town
- Coordinates: 38°19′34″S 142°21′45″E
- Country: Australia
- State: Victoria
- LGA: Shire of Moyne

Government
  - State electorate: South West Coast
  - Federal division: Wannon

Population
  - Total: 83 (2021 census)
- Time zone: UTC+10 (AEST)
  - Summer (DST): UTC+11 (AEST)
- Postcode: 3283

Tower Hill is a locality in the Shire of Moyne, Victoria, Australia. At the 2021 census, Tower Hill had a population of 83. The volcano, also called Tower Hill, is located in the locality.
