= Mount Gambier (volcano) =

Maar in South Australia

- Ereng Balam
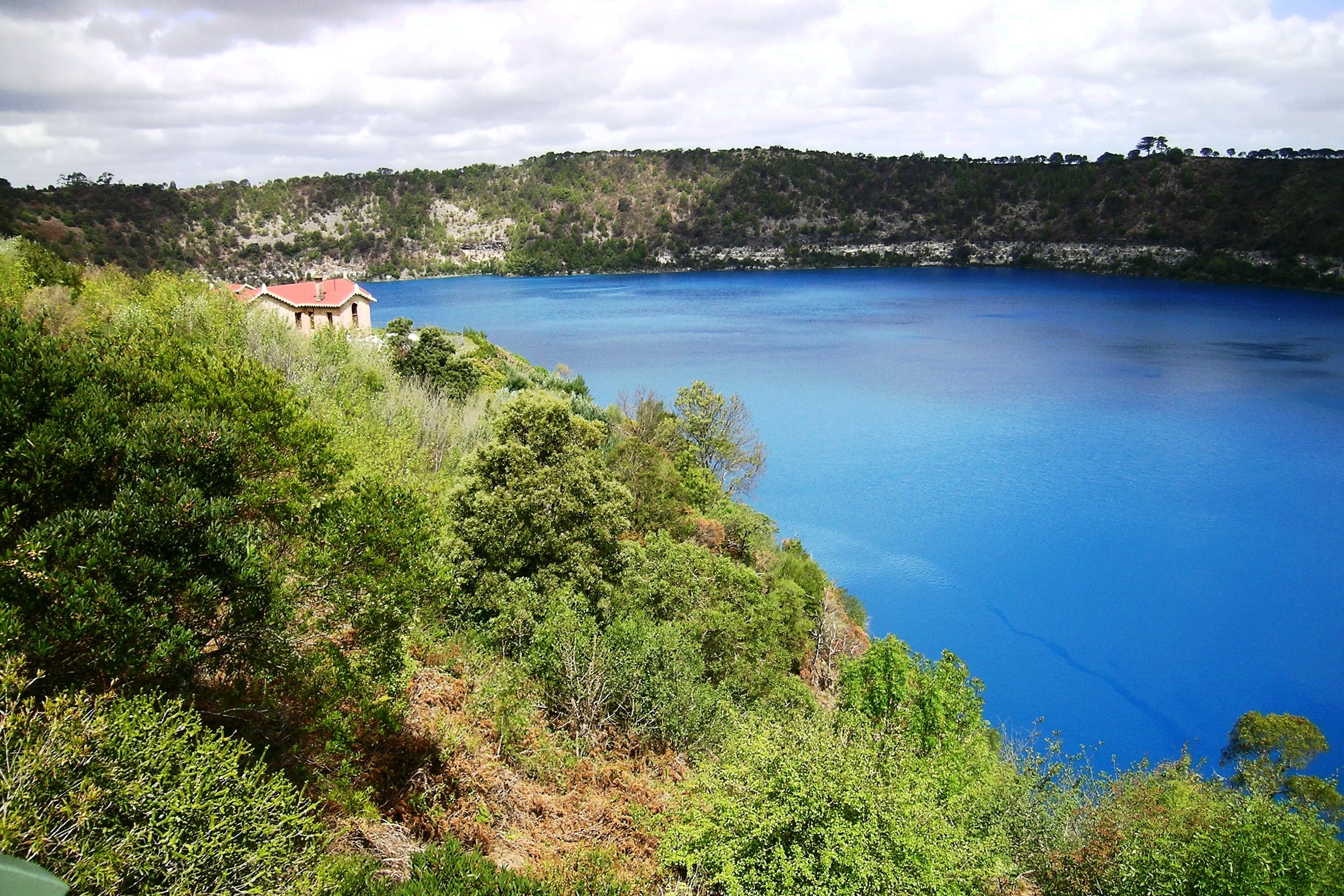
- Blue Lake maar of Mount Gambier

Highest point
- Coordinates: 37°50′S 140°45′E

Geography
- Location within South Australia
- Location: South Australia, Australia

Mount Gambier, also known as Berrin, is a maar complex in South Australia associated with the Newer Volcanics Province. The complex contains four maars, the most well-known one of which is Blue Lake / Warwar. The others are Valley Lake / Ketla Malpi, Leg of Mutton Lake / Yatton Loo and Brownes Lake / Kroweratwari. The complex is partially surrounded by the city of Mount Gambier.

== History ==
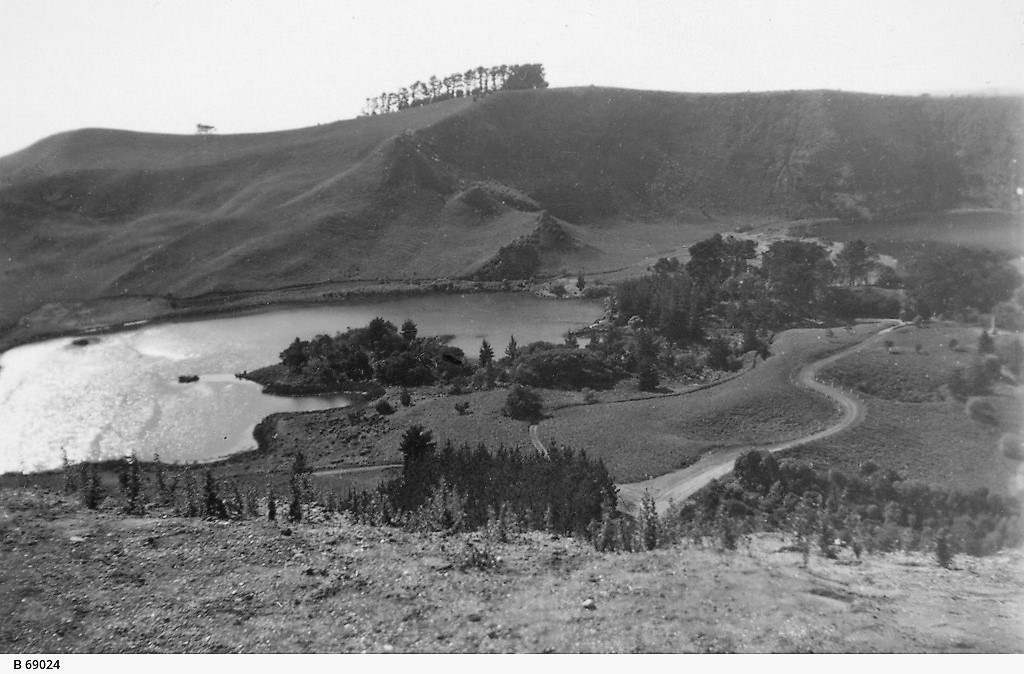
Brownes Lake, c. 1936

Mount Gambier is one of Australia's youngest volcanoes, but estimates of the age have ranged from over 28,000 to less than 4,300. The most recent estimate, based on radiocarbon dating of plant fibres in the main crater (Blue Lake) suggests an eruption a little before 6000 years ago. It is believed to be dormant rather than extinct.

Mount Gambier is thought to have formed by a mantle plume centre called the East Australia hotspot which may currently lie offshore.

The Boandik (or Bungandidj) people occupied the area before the colonisation of South Australia. They referred to the peak of the volcanic mountain as "ereng balam" or "egree belum", meaning "home of the eagle hawk", but the mountain itself was called Berrin. Their Dreaming story tells of a giant ancestor creator being called Craitbul, who wandered the land with his family looking for a place to be safe from the evil spirit, Woor, and finding it. The lakes were the ovens he built: Warwar (Blue Lake), Ketlamalpe (Valley Lake), Yattonlu (Leg of Mutton Lake) and Kraweratwari (Brownes Lake). It is believed that Craitbul lives sleeping at the bottom of Warwar.

The mountain was sighted by Lieutenant James Grant on 3 December 1800 from the survey brig HMS Lady Nelson and named for James Gambier, 1st Baron Gambier,, Admiral of the Fleet.

Brownes Lake was the site of Stephen Henty's cattle yards in the 1840s and was named after Doctor Browne who lived at nearby Moorak station. The water level has fluctuated over the years, with it having a recorded depth of 6 metres (20 ft) in 1899.

Leg of Mutton Lake (named for the outline of its shoreline) and Brownes Lake dried up as the water table dropped, since the 1980s (Brownes) and 1990s (Leg of Mutton). Both of these lakes were quite shallow; their demise is attributed to the lowering of the water table as a result of many years of land drainage to secure farmland.

== Description ==
The Boandik people referred to Mount Gambier as Berrin. It has also been recorded as being named ereng balam or egree belum, probably meaning "the home of the eagle hawk" in the Bungandidj language.

The lakes, as sites of cultural significance to the Boandik people, were assigned dual names by the City of Mount Gambier in February 2022, and the renaming included the four lakes in the Bungandidj language. These are as follows:

- Blue Lake / Warwar, meaning "crow country", or "the sound of many crows"
- Leg of Mutton Lake / Yatton Loo (unknown meaning)
- Brownes Lake / Kroweratwari, meaning "emus, [or] their tracks"
- Valley Lake / Ketla Malpi, meaning "sacred talking tree"

Blue Lake / Warwar and Valley Lake / Ketla Malpi are water-filled volcanic lakes, but Leg of Mutton Lake / Yatton Loo and Brownes Lake / Kroweratwari are dry. Brownes Lake is used as a picnic area.

This area is part of the UNESCO-endorsed Kanawinka Geopark, and the city of Mount Gambier partially surrounds the maar complex.

== See also ==
- List of volcanoes in Australia
