= Tower Hill (volcano) =

Mountain in Victoria, Australia

Tower Hill (Koroitj)
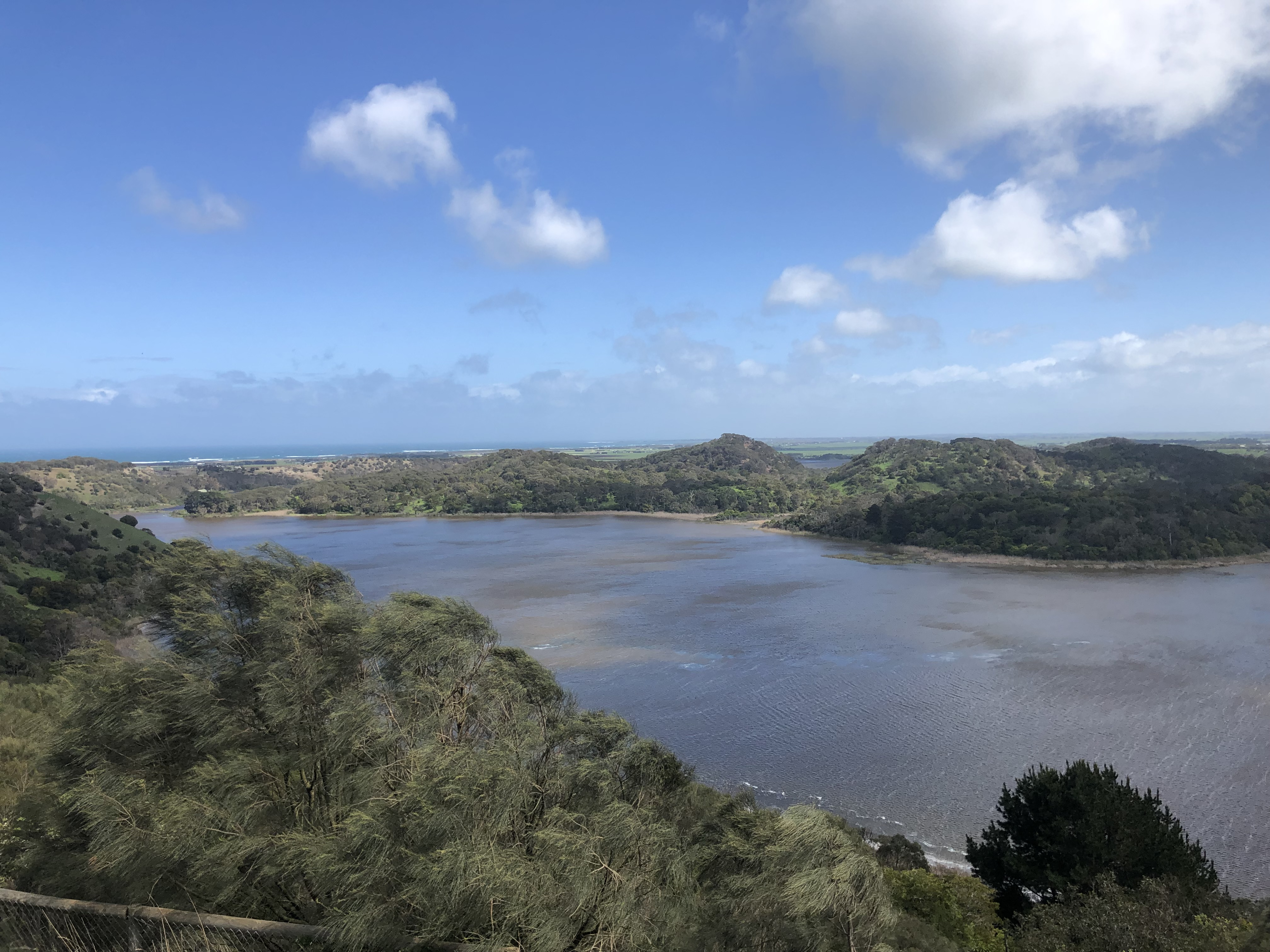
- View of Tower Hill

Highest point
- Elevation: 103 m (338 ft)
- Coordinates: 38°19′17″S 142°21′35″E

Geography
- Location within Victoria
- Location: Tower Hill, Victoria, Australia

Geology
- Last eruption: 34,000 BP

Tower Hill is an inactive volcano on the south-west coast of Victoria, Australia, approximately 275 kilometres (171 mi) west of Melbourne, and 15 kilometres (9 mi) north-west of Warrnambool. The Tower Hill crater is roughly 3 kilometres (2 mi) wide and 80 metres (260 ft) high, with a gradient of between 10% and 80% at the higher points. Within the crater, a series of later volcanic explosions formed a number of scoria cones and spheres, surrounded by a crater lake. Being a giant nested maar, Tower Hill is of international geological significance. The Dhauwurdwurrung name for the volcano is Koroitj.

== History ==
Aboriginal Australian kitchen middens at Tower Hill contain 5000-year-old Tasmanian devil bones. Greenstone axe heads and other artefacts excavated from the tuff indicate that Aboriginal people were resident in the area when the volcano erupted. A basalt tool dubbed the "Bushfield Axe", found buried under volcanic ash near Tower Hill in 1947, was particularly significant. The archaeological evidence aligns with local people's oral histories of volcanic eruptions, indicating the longevity and truth of those histories. The Koroitgundidj people long inhabited this region of Australia, and their descendants retain special links with the area.

In 1990, the most recent eruption was dated to c.25,000 BP. However, in February 2020, a study was carried out by the University of Melbourne's School of Earth Sciences' David Phillips and three other researchers, using a more sophisticated form of radiometric dating known as argon-argon dating, showed that both the Budj Bim and Tower Hill volcanoes erupted at least 34,000 years ago. Specifically, the Tower Hill eruption was dated at within 3,800 years either side of 36,800 years BP. Significantly, that is a "minimum age constraint for human presence in Victoria", and also could be interpreted as evidence for the Gunditjmara oral histories which tell of volcanic eruptions being some of the oldest oral traditions in existence.

The first confirmed sighting of Tower Hill by Europeans was in 1802, by French explorers sailing with Nicolas Baudin on Géographe. Matthew Flinders sailed east along the southern coast of Australia and, on 20 April 1802, referred in the ship's log to "Peaked Hill Position uncertain", which may refer to Tower Hill.

In 1855, the Hill was painted by the artist Eugene von Guerard, the foremost landscape artist in the colonies at the time. The painting Tower Hill, 1855 is now in the Warrnambool Art Gallery. The painting was used as a source of information of local native vegetation when an extensive revegetation project was undertaken in the Tower Hill Wildlife Reserve from 1961.

=== Naming ===
The origin of the English name, Tower Hill, is not certain. One source suggests that it arose in the 1840s owing to its resemblance to a castle, while another credits a sailor from Glasgow with "naming the site after Tower Hill in Scotland".

== Location ==
The town of Koroit is on the north rim of Tower Hill, within easy reach of both Warrnambool and Port Fairy. The volcano is located about 275 kilometres (171 mi) west of Melbourne and 15 kilometres (9.3 mi) north-west of Warrnambool.

== Description ==
Tower Hill's formation is known as a "nested maar", the largest of its type in Victoria. It was created by molten lava pushing its way up through the Earth's crust, before hitting a layer of water-bearing rock, which led to huge explosions. A shallow crater was left, later becoming a lake after it filled with rainwater. Subsequent to this, later eruptions occurred in the centre of this crater-lake, pushing up islands and cone-shaped hills, known as scoria cones.

It is "one of the largest eruption points of the Pleistocene Newer Volcanics Province of Victoria". The main crater is 3.2 kilometres (2.0 mi) by 2.4 kilometres (1.5 mi). Within the steep-walled tuff ring is a crater with a depth of over 90 metres (300 ft). Because of the complex nature of its formation and structure, and as one of the largest maars in the world, it is of great geological significance both nationally and internationally.

Tower Hill volcano is roughly 4 kilometres (2.5 mi) wide and 80 metres (260 ft) high, and as a giant maar (volcanic explosion crater), it is of international and national geological significance. It has a gradient of between 10% and 80% at the higher points.

== Reserve ==
Now part of the state park system as the Tower Hill Wildlife Reserve, the area had been used since European settlement for farming and stone quarrying. The area has been reforested with native flora, and repopulated with native fauna since 1961.

== Brown's Quarry ==
Brown's Quarry, on the southern side, was created in about 1951, but since around 1977 has only been used for dumping clean landfill. As of 2021 there is debate about what to do with the site next. The owners of the quarry would like to fill the quarry and restore the vegetation, arguing that this would make the perimeter of the volcano safer and allow a walking track to be built around it (which is part of the Tower Hill master plan), but geologists say that the wall of the quarry is very important for scientific analysis and understanding of the geology of the area and volcanoes in general, which is evolving all the time.

== Gallery ==
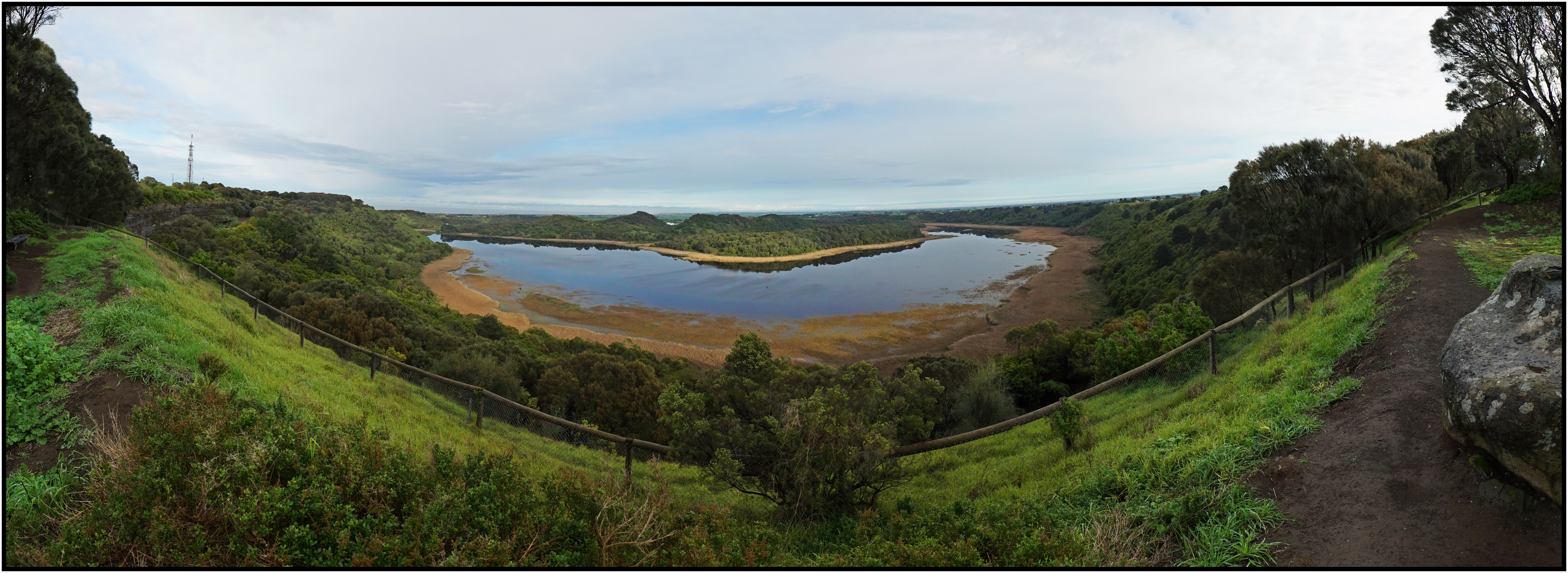
Panoramic photograph from the Eugene von Guerard lookout at Tower Hill, looking south. This lookout is located at approximate location from which he painted his Tower Hill, 1855 painting.

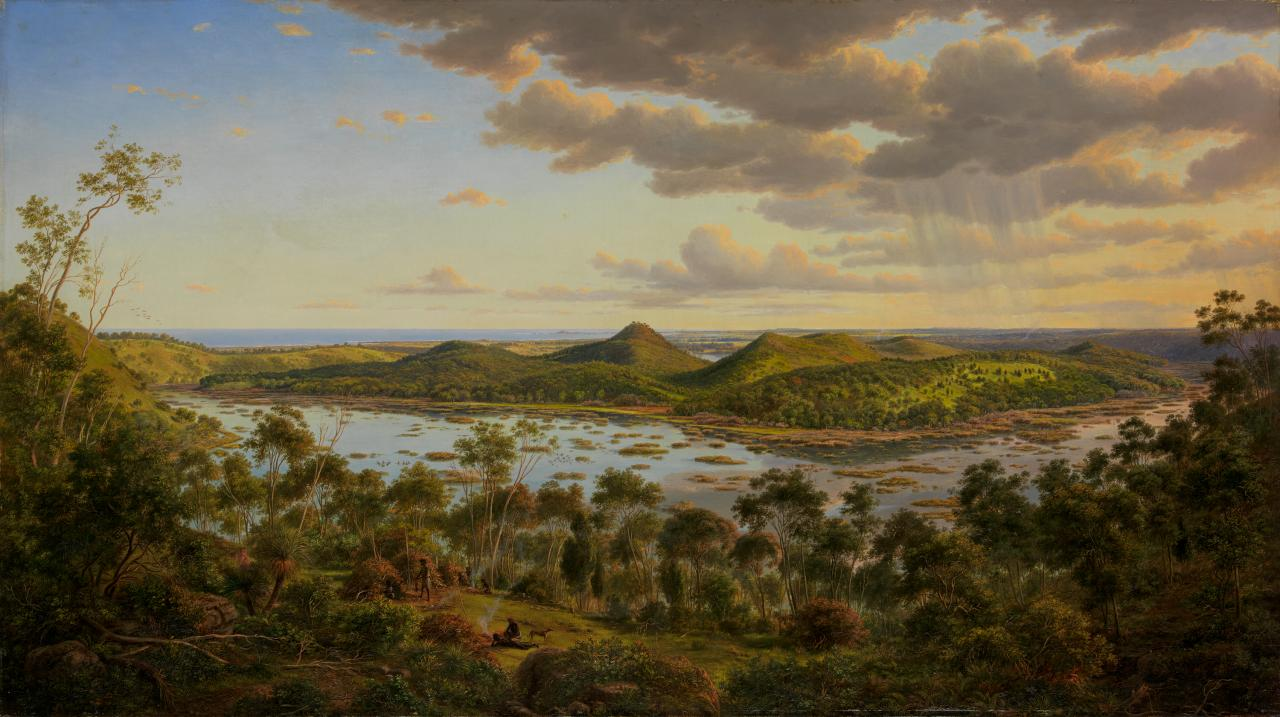
Eugene von Guerard's Tower Hill, 1855.

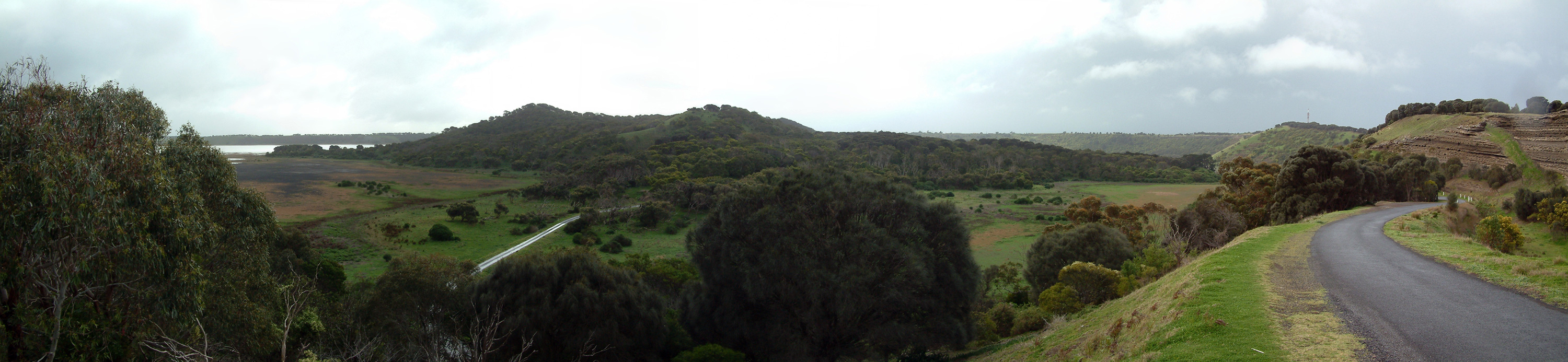
Large panorama of crater, from the south, looking north. Visible are the scoria cones forming the 'islands' in the middle of the crater, and the lake and far rims of the larger crater. Note the layering in the far right-hand side of the image.

== See also ==
- List of volcanoes in Australia (active and dormant)
