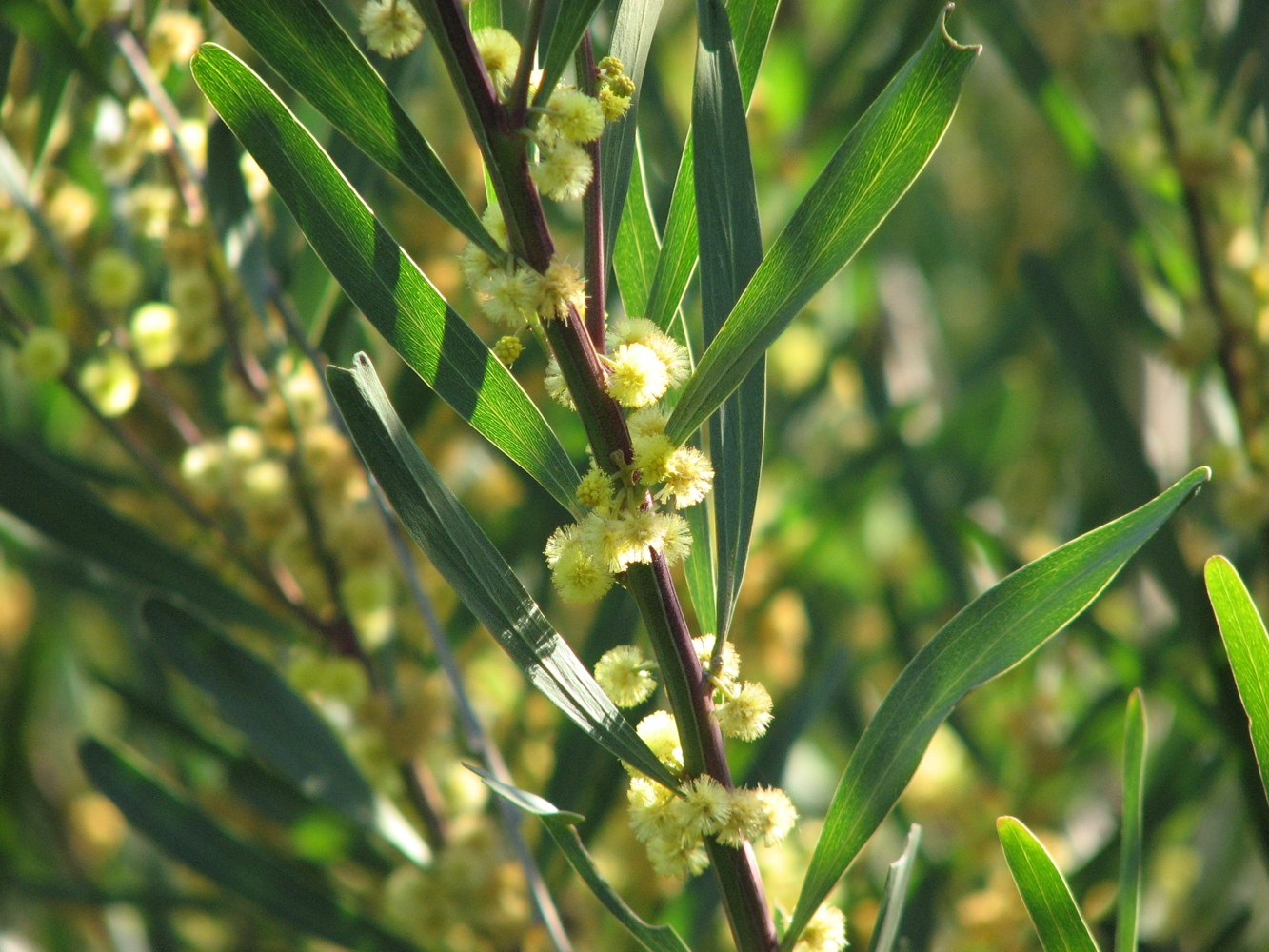
- In Geelong Botanic Gardens

Conservation status
- Least Concern (IUCN 3.1)

Scientific classification
- Kingdom: Plantae
- Clade: Embryophytes
- Clade: Tracheophytes
- Clade: Spermatophytes
- Clade: Angiosperms
- Clade: Eudicots
- Clade: Rosids
- Order: Fabales
- Family: Fabaceae
- Subfamily: Caesalpinioideae
- Clade: Mimosoid clade
- Genus: Acacia
- Species: A. stricta

Binomial name
- Acacia stricta (Andrews) Willd.

Synonyms
- Acacia emarginata Wendl.; Acacia leprosa auct. non DC.; Acacia stricta (Andrews) Willd. var. binervis F.Muell.; Acacia stricta (Andrews) Willd. var. pleiocephala F.Muell.; Mimosa stricta Andrews; Phyllodoce stricta (Andrews) Link; Racosperma strictum (Andrews) C.Mart.

= Acacia stricta =

Hop wattle

Species of legume

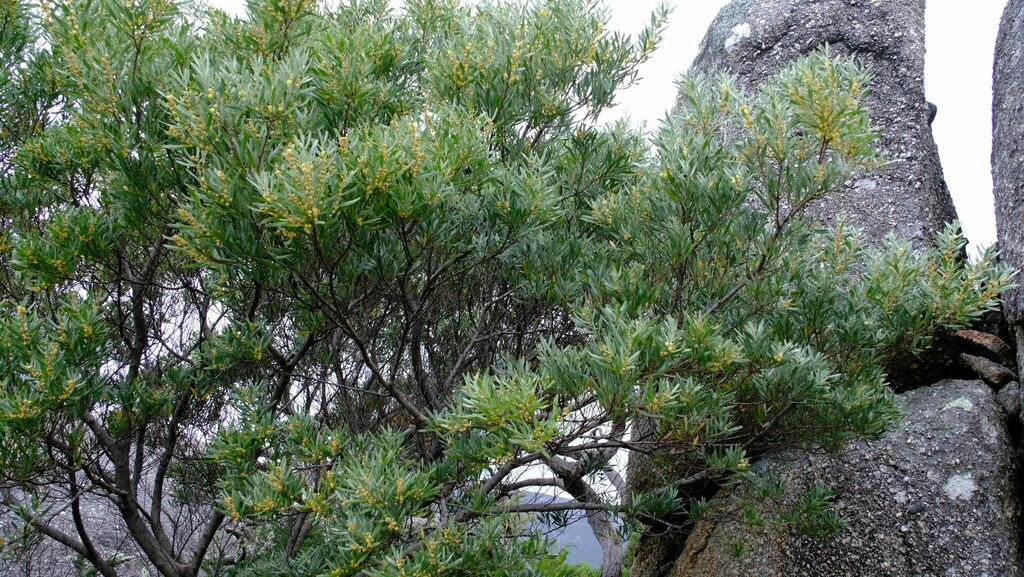
Habit at Wilsons Promontory

Acacia stricta (hop wattle, straight wattle) is a perennial tree. The plant is adaptable to most soils, tolerating full sun or partial to complete shade. Tolerates drought conditions and moderately salty winds. The shrub is useful in planting, as it is not too dense and can be used for screening other plants. The plant grows up to 2-4m depending on conditions.

== See also ==
- Penambol Conservation Park
