= Christina Smith (missionary) =

Christian lay missionary and educator

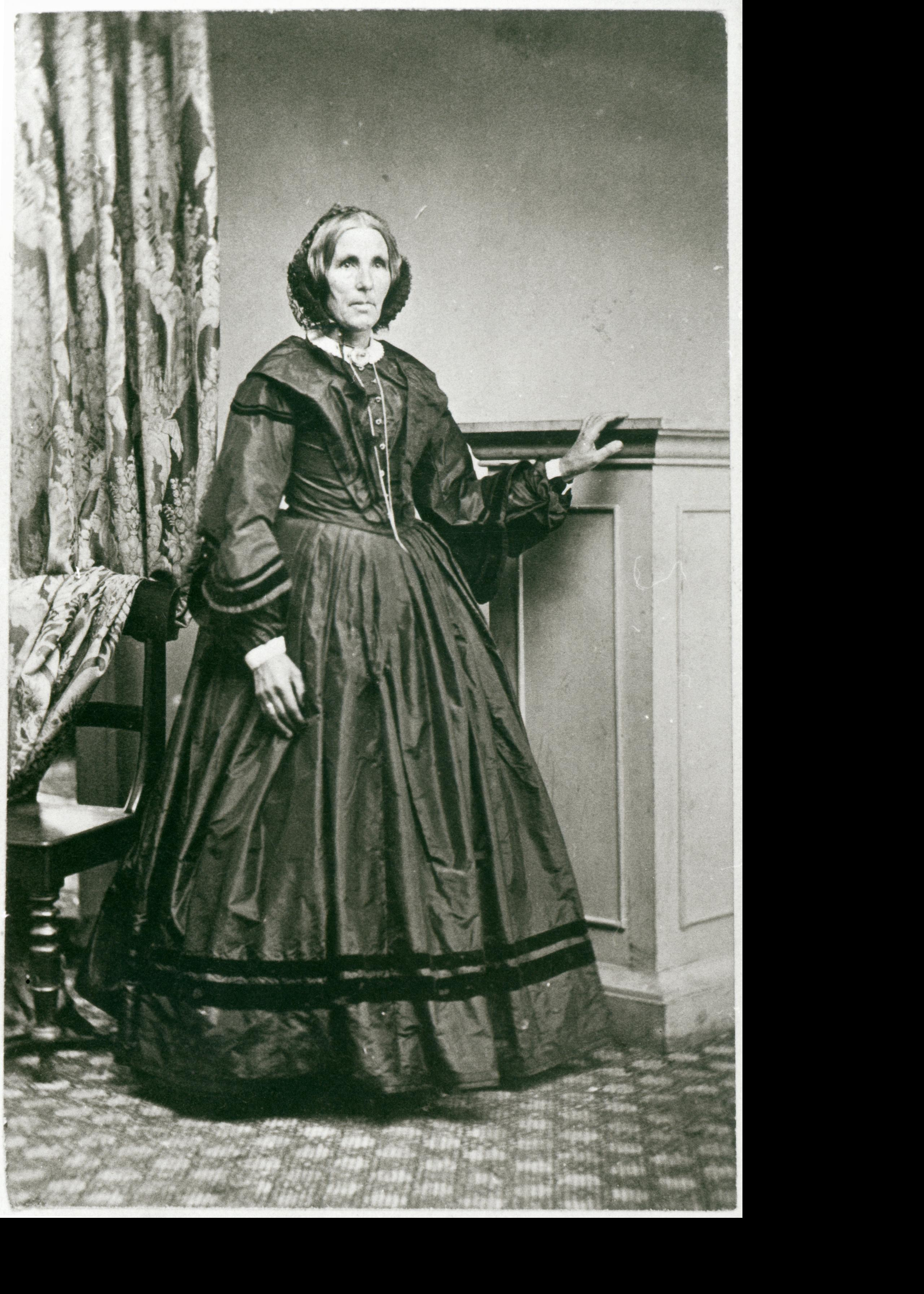
Christina Smith (c. 1865)

Christina Smith (1809–1893), generally referred to as Mrs James Smith, was a teacher and Christian missionary who documented the lives, customs, legends, and language of the Buandig Indigenous Australians (historically spelled Booandik) who live in south-eastern South Australia and western Victoria.

== Biography ==
Born in Glenyon, Perthshire, Scotland around 25 July 1809, she was raised a devout Presbyterian. She emigrated to Australia with her son Duncan Stewart (1833–1913) and two brothers after the death of her first husband, reaching Melbourne on 27 October 1839. Her second marriage was to James Smith, a Presbyterian teacher at the Collins Street Congregational Church. Christina had eight children in this marriage. The Smiths moved to Rivoli Bay south (Greytown) in 1845 where Christina acted with Christian compassion for the Buandig people concerned at their treatment by other European settlers and engaged in education and Christian missionary work with the aborigines. For several years she was the only white woman in the southern end of the district.

Christina and her son Duncan Stewart learnt the Bungandidj language with Duncan being appointed an interpreter for this language in 1853. The family moved to a small farm near Mount Gambier in 1854 where Christina opened a night school teaching aboriginal orphans and adults until James Smith's death in 1860. A day school was opened in 1864 in Mount Gambier teaching scripture and the rudiments of a basic education to aboriginal children. After an epidemic and loss of support for her school and with student numbers reduced to 4, the school closed in 1868, although it continued as a home for Buandig orphan children.

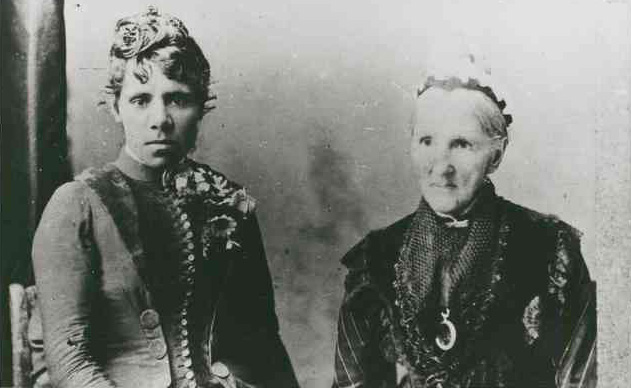
Mrs James Smith (right) and Jenny Westendorf of Mt Gambier (1880)

Her book on the Buandig people - The Booandik Tribe of South Australian Aborigines: A Sketch of Their Habits, Customs, Legends, and Language: also an account of the efforts made by Mr and Mrs James Smith to Christianise and civilise them - was published in 1880 containing ethnographic observations, personal anecdotes, brief biographies of local natives who converted to Christianity, and a comprehensive vocabulary of the Bungandidj language and grammatical construction. In the preface she explained she wrote the book out of a strong sense of duty, to record the characteristics, customs, habits, language, and legends of the local people before they disappeared under the force of European colonists. She claimed the authority to perform this duty for future historians, arguing she had been “intimately acquainted” with the Aborigines for more than 35 years.

Smith wrote about a famous bloody massacre where station owner James Brown slaughtered 11 aborigines, including an elderly blind man and girls aged 18 months, 2 years, 12 and 15, but the trial was aborted and he was never held to account. Fifteen years after the case was dropped Smith published a pamphlet with details of the cruelty:

The white men showed no mercy to either the grey-headed old man or to the helpless infant on its mother's breast. [...] Doubtless had the natives been the murderers instead of the murdered, sufficient evidence would have been found, or perhaps less conclusive proof would have been deemed sufficient to justify a sentence of death. But let those who are concerned remember that a day of retribution is at hand, when impartial justice will be dealt to all, irrespective of rank or colour. At that day all the evidence required will be brought forth-the Judge will be an impartial one; and those eleven victims, whose bodies the flames consumed, will stand forth and witness against the real criminals, whose doom will be to endure the torments of the eternal fire.

She also contributed material in 1881 to the work of anthropologist Alfred William Howitt.

Smith died on 28 April 1893 at Mount Gambier and is buried in Lake Terrace cemetery.

The school in Mount Gambier where Christina Smith taught was added to the South Australian Heritage list in 1994.

The Lady Nelson Discovery Centre in Mount Gambier uses a hologram image of Christina Smith to explain the story of the region's early contact between settlers and Aboriginal people.

== See also ==
Penambol Conservation Park
