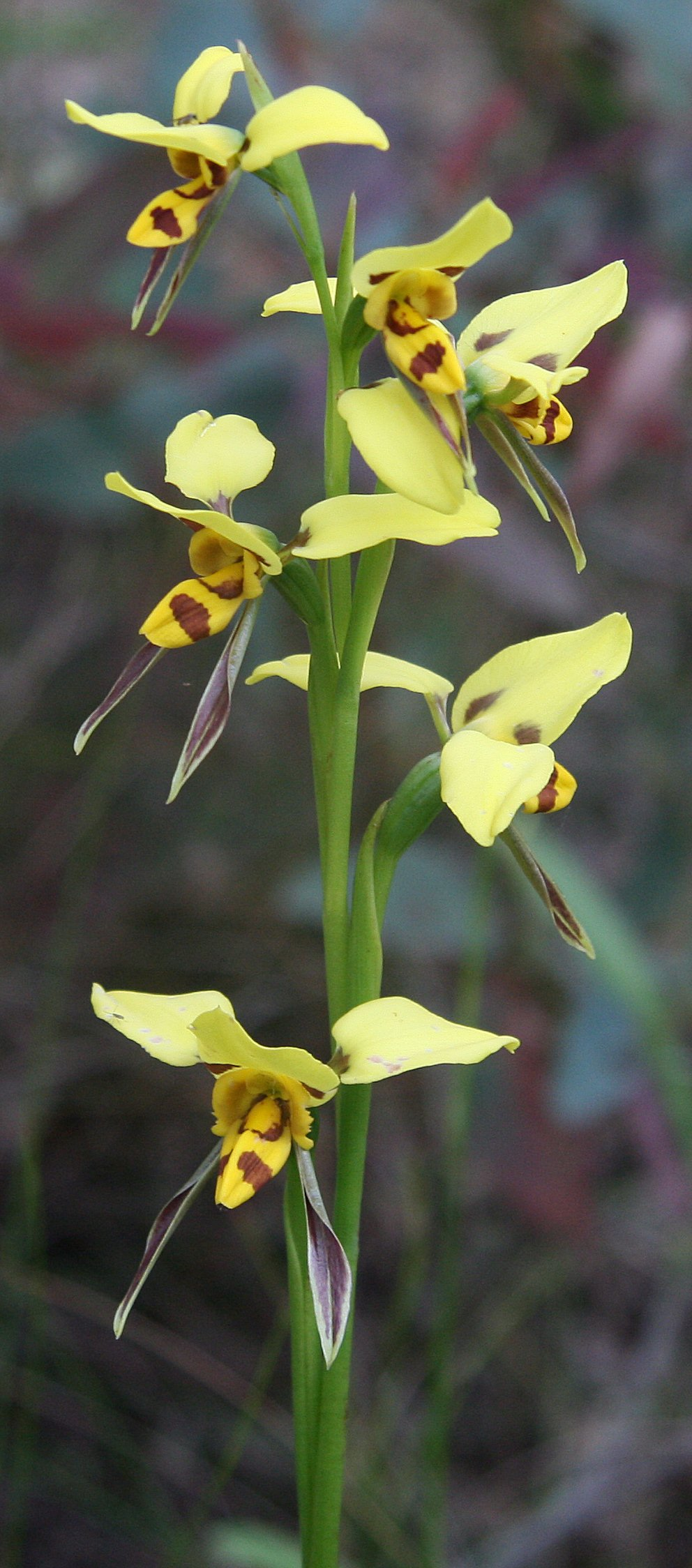
- At Lawson

Scientific classification
- Kingdom: Plantae
- Clade: Embryophytes
- Clade: Tracheophytes
- Clade: Angiosperms
- Clade: Monocots
- Order: Asparagales
- Family: Orchidaceae
- Subfamily: Orchidoideae
- Tribe: Diurideae
- Genus: Diuris
- Species: D. sulphurea

Binomial name
- Diuris sulphurea R.Br.

Synonyms
- List: Diuris latifolia Rupp; Diuris oculata Rupp nom. inval., pro syn.; Diuris oculata Lindl. nom. inval., pro syn.; Diuris oculata M.A.Clem. nom. inval., pro syn.; Diuris oculata D.L.Jones nom. inval., pro syn.; Diuris oculata D.L.Jones nom. inval., pro syn.; Diuris sulfurea Gand. orth. var.; Diuris sulfurea f. immaculata Gand. orth. var.; Diuris sulfurea f. tasmanica Gand. orth. var.; Diuris sulphurea f. immaculata Gand.; Diuris sulphurea R.Br. f. sulphurea; Diuris sulphurea f. tasmanica Gand.; Diuris sulphurea R.Br. var. sulphurea

= Diuris sulphurea =

Tiger orchid

Species of tiger orchid from Australia

Diuris sulphurea, commonly called tiger orchid or hornet orchid, is a species of orchid which is endemic to eastern Australia. It has up to three leaves, and a flowering stem with up to seven bright yellow flowers with dark brown markings.

== Description ==
Diuris sulphurea is a tuberous, perennial herb with up to three linear to lance-shaped leaves 200–500 mm (8–20 in) long and 3–4 mm (0.1–0.2 in) wide. Up to seven flowers 20–30 mm (0.8–1 in) wide are borne on a flowering stem 200–500 mm (8–20 in) tall. The flowers are bright yellow with a few prominent dark brown markings. The dorsal sepal is egg-shaped, erect or leaning forward, 15–20 mm (0.6–0.8 in) long and 9–13 mm (0.4–0.5 in) wide. The lateral sepals are green or green and brown, linear, 16–25 mm (0.6–1 in) long, 1–3 mm (0.04–0.1 in) wide, turned downwards and usually parallel to each other. The petals are erect or turned backwards with an egg-shaped blade 12–18 mm (0.5–0.7 in) long and 7–11 mm (0.3–0.4 in) wide on a dark brown stalk 5–8 mm (0.2–0.3 in) long. The labellum is 10–15 mm (0.4–0.6 in) long and has three lobes. The centre lobe is spade-shaped, 8–13 mm (0.3–0.5 in) long, 7–10 mm (0.3–0.4 in) wide and the side lobes are egg-shaped with the narrower end towards the base, 4–6 mm (0.16–0.24 in) long and 2.5–4 mm (0.1–0.2 in) wide. There is a ridge-shaped callus in the mid-line of the base of the labellum and extending about halfway along. Flowering occurs from August to December.

== Taxonomy and naming ==
Diuris sulphurea was first formally described in 1810 by Robert Brown and the description was published in Prodromus florae Novae Hollandiae.

== Distribution and habitat ==
Tiger orchid occurs in all states of Australia except Western Australia and the Northern Territory. It grows in forest, woodland, heath, grassland and coastal scrub. In Victoria it often occurs with Diuris pardina and sometimes forms hybrids with that species.
