= Blue Lake / Warwar =

Large monomictic lake in Mount Gambier, South Australia

Blue Lake
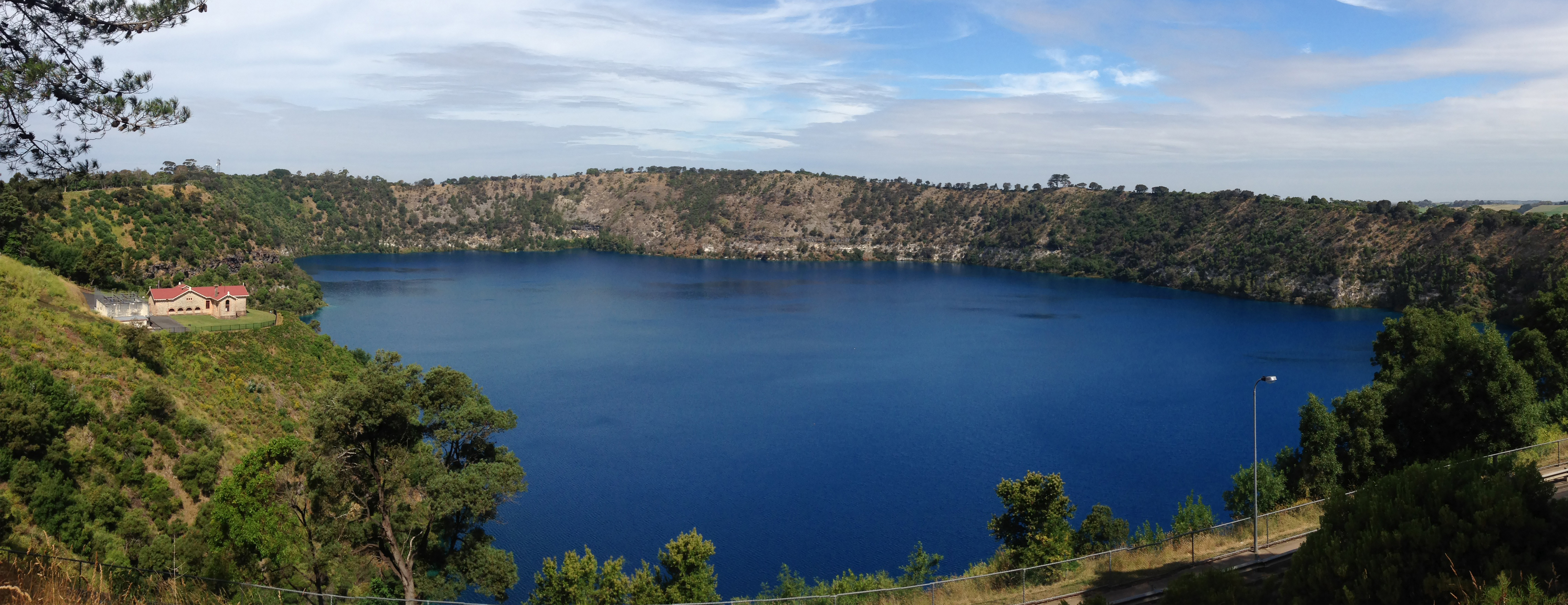
- Panorama of the Blue Lake in late December

- Location in South Australia
- Location: Mount Gambier, South Australia
- Coordinates: 37°50′48″S 140°46′41″E
- Type: Monomictic crater lake
- Basin countries: Australia
- Max. length: 1,087 m (3,566 ft)
- Max. width: 657 m (2,156 ft)
- Surface area: 60 ha (150 acres)
- Average depth: 72 m (236 ft)
- Max. depth: 77 m (253 ft)
- Residence time: 3.45 years
- Surface elevation: Approx. 20 m (66 ft)
- Islands: None
- Settlements: None

Blue Lake / Warwar (The Blue Lake) is a large, monomictic, crater lake located in a dormant volcanic maar associated with the Mount Gambier maar complex. The lake is situated near Mount Gambier in the Limestone Coast region of South Australia, and is one of four volcanic crater lakes originally on Mount Gambier maar. Of the four lakes, only two remain, the other one being Valley Lake / Ketla Malpi; the other two, Leg of Mutton Lake / Yatton Loo and Brownes Lake / Kroweratwari, dried up as the water table dropped.

== History ==
Conflicting dates have been estimated for the last eruption of the volcano: of 4,300 years ago, of 28,000 years ago, and a little before 6,000 years ago. If the youngest date is correct, this could be the most recent volcanic eruption on the Australian mainland.

The Boandik (or Bungandidj) people occupied the area before the colonisation of South Australia.

== Description ==
Blue Lake / Warwar (also Waawar) is one of four lakes in the Dormant volcano complex. Sites of cultural significance to the Boandik people were assigned dual names by the City of Mount Gambier in February 2022, and the renaming included the four lakes in the Bungandidj language. These are as follows:

- Blue Lake / Warwar, meaning "crow country"
- Leg of Mutton Lake / Yatton Loo
- Brownes Lake / Kroweratwari, meaning "emus, [or] their tracks"
- Valley Lake / Ketla Malpi, meaning "sacred talking tree"

The bottom of Blue Lake is basically flat, having an average depth of around 72 metres (~238 feet). The crater rim measures 1,200 by 824 m (3,937 by 2,703 ft), but the lake itself measures 1,087 by 657 m (3,566 by 2,156 ft). The surface of the lake is 17 m (56 ft) below the level of the main street of the nearby town. Blue Lake supplies the town with drinking water.

Browne's Lake / Kroweratwari (sometimes spelt Browns Lake) dried up in the 1980s, and is now a picnic spot.

There is a 3.6 km (2.2 mi) road and walking track around the circumference of Blue Lake / Warwar, with an underpass between it and Leg of Mutton Lake / Yatton Loo.

== Annual colour change ==
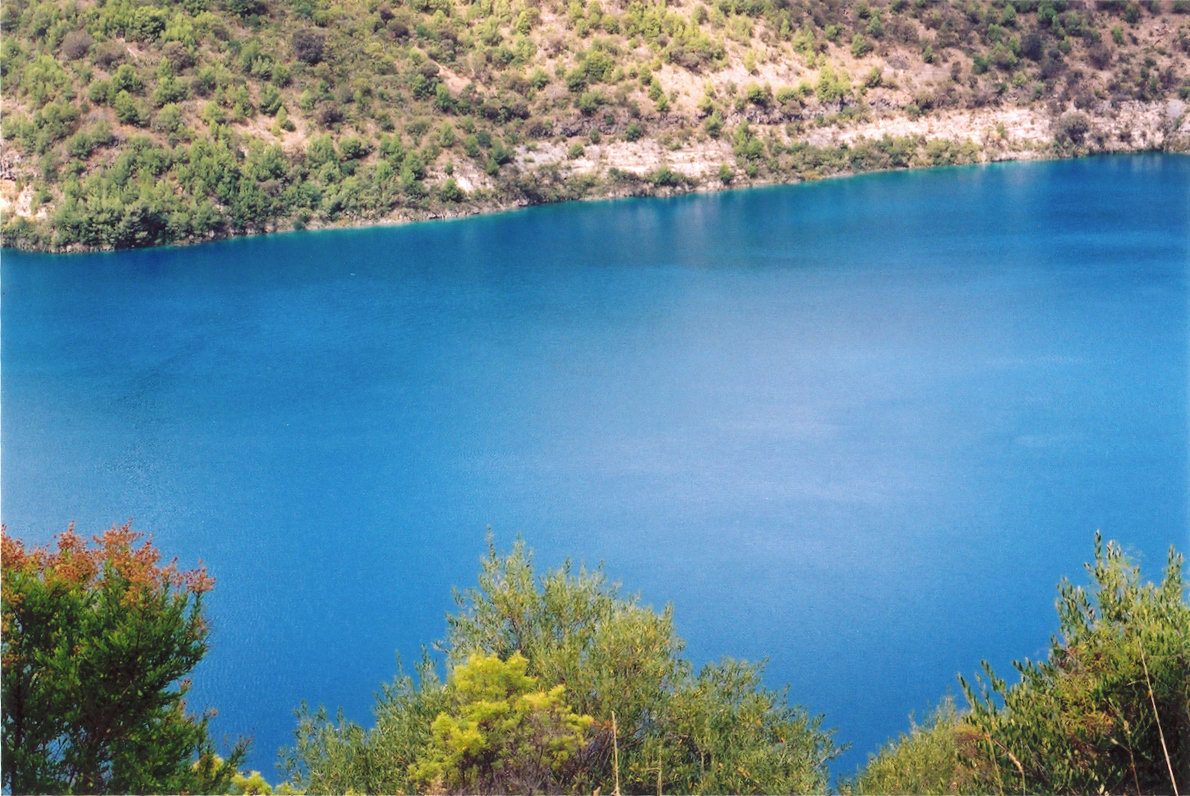
The Blue Lake in early March

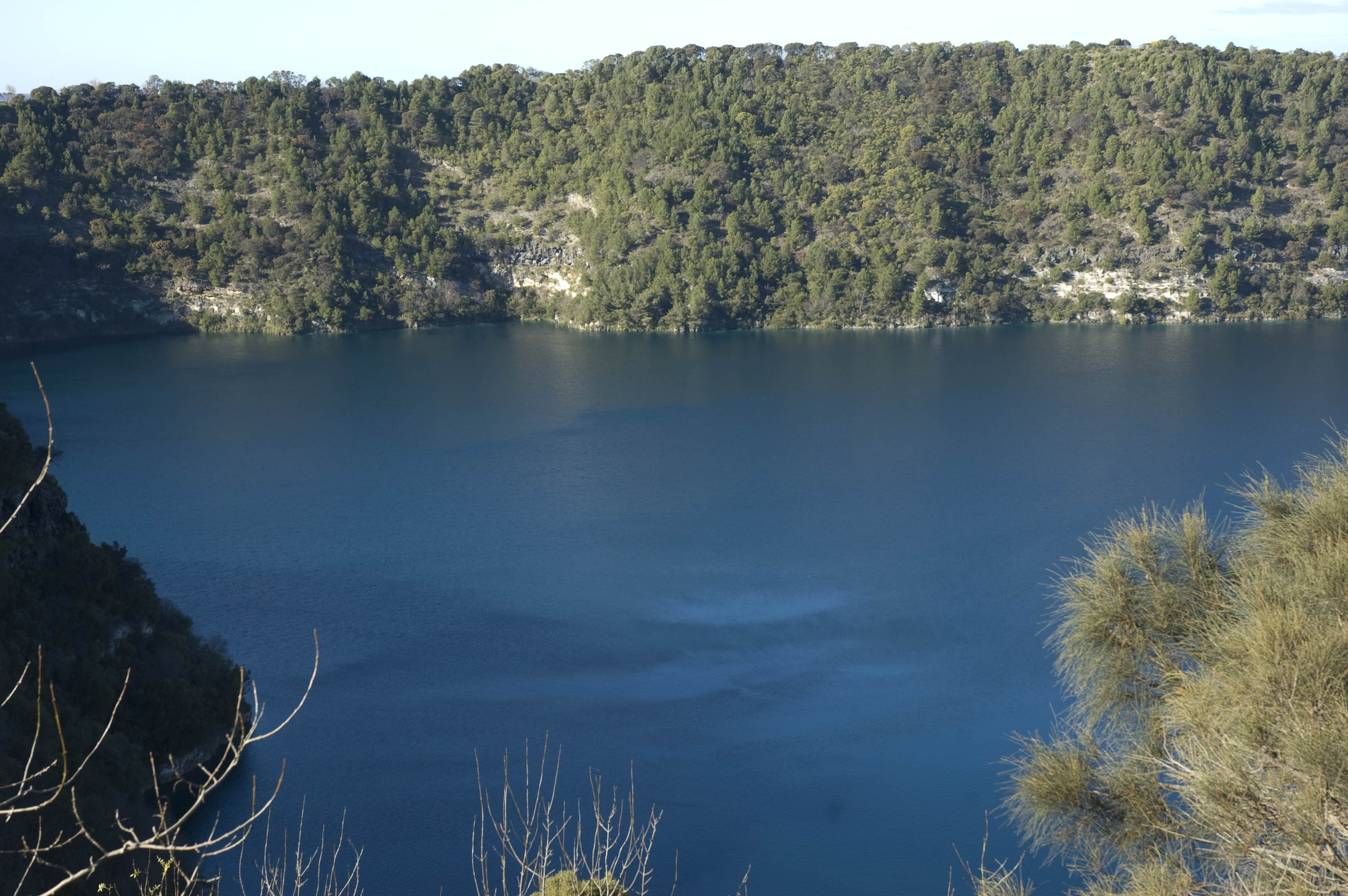
Blue Lake / Warwar in June

Each November, the lake turns to a deep turquoise colour, gradually returning to a duller blue colour in late February to March. The exact cause of this phenomenon is still a matter of conjecture, but likely it involves the warming of the surface layers of the lake during the summer to around 20 °C (68 °F), causing calcium carbonate to precipitate out of the solution and enabling microcrystallites of calcium carbonate to form. This results in scatter of the blue wavelengths of sunlight. During winter, the lake becomes well mixed, and recent research indicates that during this phase of the colour cycle, the lake is somewhat murkier due to the redistribution of tannins and calcium carbonate particles throughout the lake. Solar elevation has also been found to influence the perceived colour of the lake. The movement of planktonic life forms within the lake during the seasons and during the day may additionally play a part in the colour change.

== Studies ==
Bathymetric surveys located the deepest point in the lake at 77 m (253 ft) in 1967. Major diving exploration of the lake first occurred in 1985, when a dive team led by cave diver Peter Horne conducted temperature and visibility studies and made discoveries of a freshwater sponge species and other invertebrates. This exploration also discovered the Stromatolite Field, a collection of hollow rock formations that are found mainly along the north-eastern perimeter down to a depth of 40 m (130 ft). Horne coordinated four additional studies (in winter 1985 and the summers of 1987, 1989 & 1991) in conjunction with specialists from the South Australian Museum, Adelaide University and Monash University, and in 2008 permission was granted by SA Water for another diving exploration of the central and deepest parts of the lake. This dive team was coordinated by Dr Richard Harris; core samples were collected from the calcite-silt covered lake bed where water temperature dropped to 14 °C (57 °F).

== Gordon's leap ==
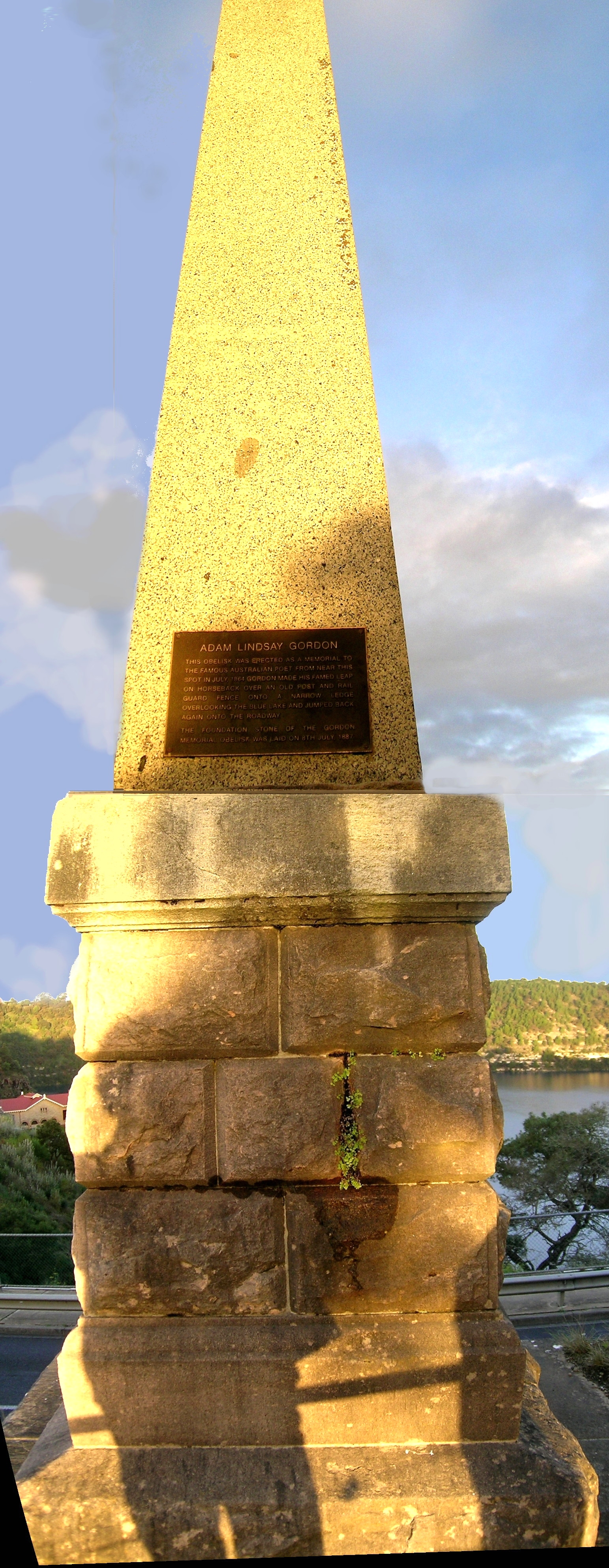
The Gordon obelisk at the Blue Lake

In July 1865, Adam Lindsay Gordon performed the daring riding feat known as Gordon's Leap on the edge of the Blue Lake. A commemorative obelisk erected there has an inscription which reads:

This obelisk was erected as a memorial to the famous Australian poet. From near this spot in July, 1865, Gordon made his famed leap on horseback over an old post and rail guard fence onto a narrow ledge overlooking the Blue Lake and jumped back again onto the roadway. The foundation stone of the Gordon Memorial Obelisk was laid on 8th July 1887

== Gallery ==
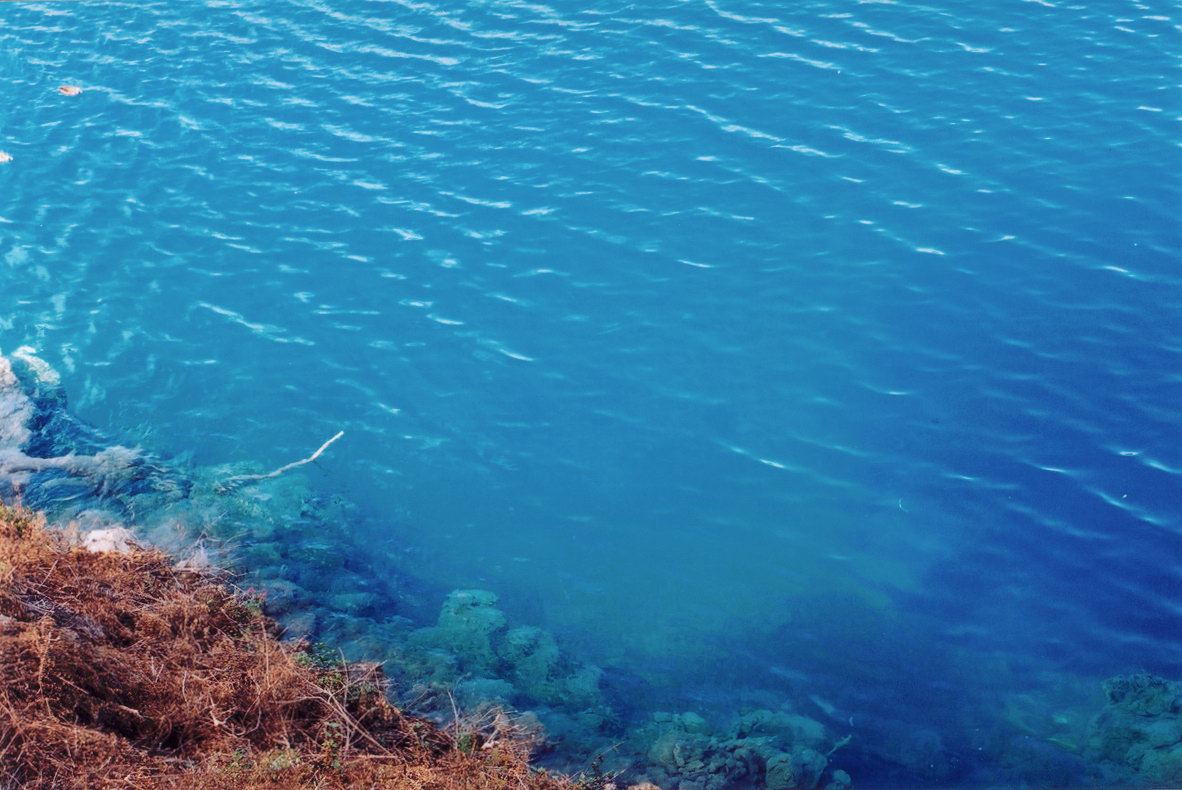
About 4 m (13 ft) above the lake's surface

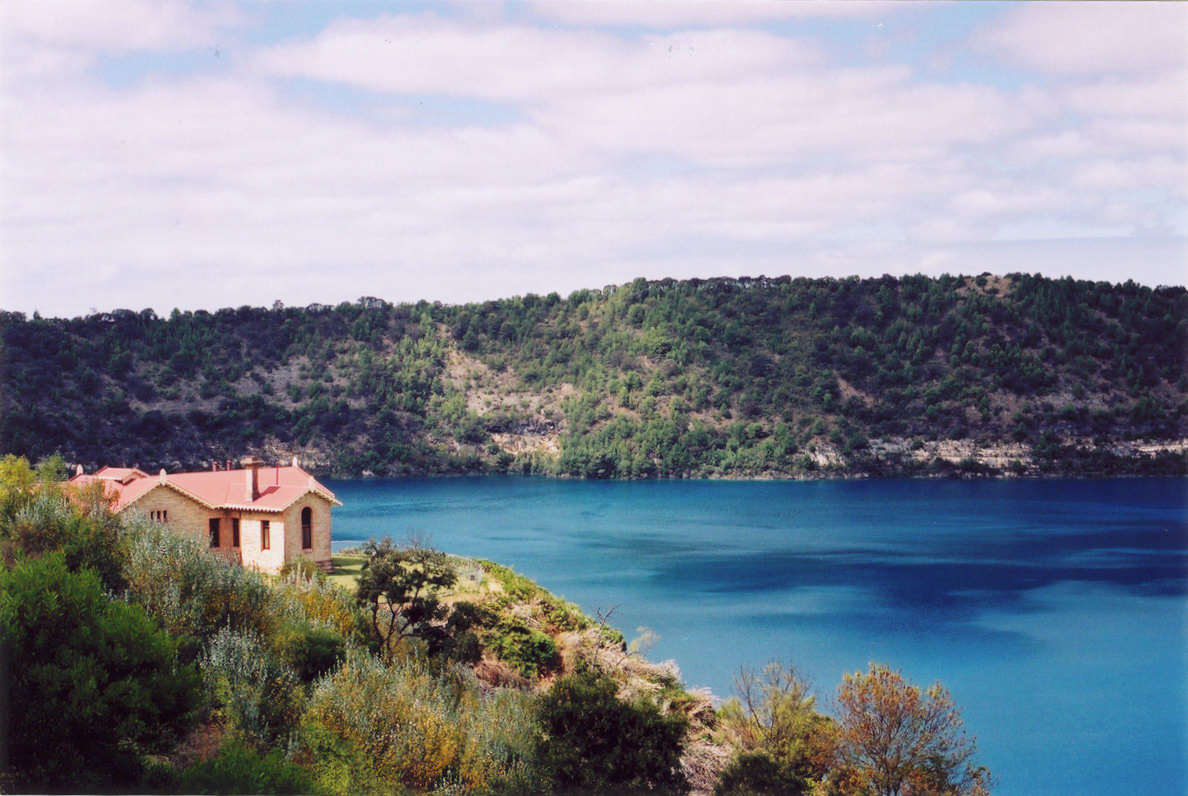
The lake in early March with the original pumping station in the foreground

== See also ==
- List of lakes of Australia § South Australia
