= Meintangk people =

Aboriginal Australian people

The Meintangk people are an Aboriginal Australian people of south-eastern South Australia, often classified as a subgroup of the Ngarrindjeri people.

== Country ==
According to ethnologist Norman Tindale's 1974 work, Meintangk land extended across an estimated 1,500 sq mi (3,900 km^{2}). It stretched from Lacepede Bay, northwards some 12 miles (19 km) from Kingston to the Granite Rock. To the south its coastal boundaries lay on Cape Jaffa and inland eastwards to Lucindale, Blackford, Keilira, and Naracoorte. The inland territory from Lake Hawdon to Mosquito Creek also formed part of their land.

== People ==
The Meintangk comprised at least seven groups. Among these were the Paintjunga who were located at Penola.

== Notable people ==
- Irene Watson, Professor of Law at University of South Australia Business School, is of mixed Meintangk and Tanganekald descent, and has written a book on the history of Aboriginal peoples in the southeast.

== Alternative names ==
According to Tindale, other names used to refer to the Meintangk people included:

- Painbali (the exonym used of the Meintangk by the Tanganekald people)
- Paintjunga
- Pinchunga, Pinejunga
- Mootatunga
- Wepulprap (a Tanganekald term, signifying "southern people")
