= Bungandidj language =

Australian Aboriginal language

Bungandidj
- Buwandik
- Region: South-east South Australia; South-west Victoria
- Ethnicity: Bungandidj
- Extinct: (date missing)
- Revival: by 2017
- Language family: Pama–Nyungan: Southeastern; Victorian; Kulin–Bungandidj; Bungandidj
- Dialects: Bungandidj; Pinejunga; Mootatunga; Wichintunga; Polinjunga

Language codes
- ISO 639-3: xbg
- Glottolog: bung1264
- AIATSIS: S13
- ELP: Buandig

Bungandidj is a language of Australia, spoken by the Bungandidj people, Indigenous Australians who lived in an area which is now in south-eastern South Australia and in south-western Victoria. According to Christina Smith and her book on the Buandig people, the Bungandidj called their language drualat-ngolonung (speech of man), or Booandik-ngolo (speech of the Booandik). As of 2017, there is a revival and maintenance programme under way for the language.

Historical variants of the name include: Bunganditj, Bungandaetch, Bunga(n)daetcha, Bungandity, Bungandit, Buganditch, Bungaditj, Pungantitj, Pungatitj, Booganitch, Buanditj, Buandik, Booandik, Boandiks, Bangandidj, Bungandidjk, Pungandik, Bak-on-date, Barconedeet, Booandik-ngolo, Borandikngolo, Bunganditjngolo, and Burhwundeirtch.

== Phonology ==
Bungandidj phonology is typical of Australian languages generally, sharing characteristics such as a single series of stops (no voicing contrast) at six places of articulation, a full corresponding set of nasals, laminals at all four coronal places of articulation and two glides. Extrapolating from historical written sources and knowledge of surrounding languages, Blake posits the following consonant inventory:

=== Consonants ===
	Peripheral		Laminal		Apical	
	Bilabial	Velar	Dental	Palatal	Alveolar	Retroflex
Plosive	p [p]	k [k]	th [t̪]	tj [c]	t [t]	rt [ʈ]
Nasal	m [m]	ng [ŋ]	nh [n̪]	ny [ɲ]	n [n]	rn [ɳ]
Flap/Trill					rr [r]	
Lateral			lh [l̪]	ly [ʎ]	l [l]	rl [ɭ]
Approximant	w [w]			y [j]		r [ɻ]

=== Vowels ===
	Front	Central	Back
Close	i [i]		u [u]
Open		a [a]	

=== Notes on orthography ===
- Early descriptions of Bungandidj made no distinction between the trill/flap /r/ and approximant /ɻ/ and evidence for this contrast is based on comparative evidence only. Blake transcribes both as ⟨r⟩.
- Although there is no voicing distinction, stops are transcribed with voiced symbols ⟨b, g, dh, d, rd⟩ in homorganic nasal-stop clusters (where voicing is expected).
- Syllable-final palatals are transcribed with the digraphs ⟨yt, yn, yl⟩ to avoid a final -y being confused with a vowel.
- Historical sources include five vowel graphemes including ⟨e⟩ and ⟨o⟩; however, it is likely that ⟨e⟩ belongs to the /i/ phoneme and ⟨o⟩ belongs to the /u/ phoneme. However, Blake conservatively retains some ⟨e⟩ and ⟨o⟩ segments where they are consistently transcribed in this way across historical sources.

== A poem ==
Smith (1880), on pages 138–139, records a poem written in Bungandidj :

yul-yul, thumbal (Fly beetle, bat, night)
kallaball, moonarerebul (Fly, march-fly, beetle)
nana nan molanin (parrot, little parrot.)
korotaa, king nal (wattle bird,)
yongo birrit. (minah bird.)
