= List of volcanoes in Australia =

This is a list of active, dormant and extinct volcanoes in Australia and its island territories. Note that the term volcano is used loosely as it can include groups of related volcanoes and vents that erupted at similar times with lava of related origin. The lists provided below are mainly volcanoes of Cenozoic aged, with some notable older (Mesozoic and Paleozoic aged), volcanoes included. There are no volcanoes on the Australian mainland that have erupted since European settlement, but some eruptions in Victoria, South Australia, and North Queensland could have been witnessed by Aboriginal people several thousand years ago. There are active volcanoes in the Heard and McDonald Islands.

== Australian states ==
=== Queensland ===
Name	Elevation		Location	Last eruption
Name	metres	feet	Coordinates	Last eruption
Atherton Volcano	—	—	17.5°S 144.5°E	<100,000 years ago
Lake Barrine	730	—	17.2°S 145.4°E	>17,000 years ago
Mount Quincan	703	2,306	17°18′11″S 145°34′39″E	10,000 years ago
Bauhinia Volcano	—	—	24.8°S 149.5°E	23–25 million years ago
Brisbane Volcano	—	—	27.7°S 152.6°E	16–62 million years ago
Buckland	—	—	—	—
Bundaberg Volcano	—	—	—	—
Bunya Mountains	—	—	26.9°S 151.8°E	23 million years ago
Chudleigh Volcano	—	—	10.5°S 144.2°E	250,000 years ago
Lake Eacham	—	—	17.2°S 145.6°E	>9,000 years ago
Malanda Volcano	1,200	—	17.5°S 145.5°E	3 million years ago
Mount Fox	120	—	18.50°S 145.47°E	—
Mount Hay	360	—	—	—
Fraser Volcano			25.0°S 153.35°E	31 million years ago
Hillsborough Volcano	—	—	21.0°S 149.0°E	33.2 million years ago
Sloping Hummock	90	—	24°50′33″S 152°25′35″E	—
The Crater (Mount Hypipamee)	1,000	—	17.2°S 145.2°E	—
The Crater (Bombarri Mountain)	1,000	—	19.6°S 144.3°E	—
Kinrara Volcano	—	—	18.3°S 144.6°E	7,000 years ago
Main Range Volcano	—	—	27.9°S 152.4°E	23–27 million years ago
Mount Le Brun	—	—	25°35′52″S 151°54′32″E	>600,000 years ago
Mount McBride	911	—	18.3°S 144.6°E	1.7 million years ago
McLean Volcano	—	—	15.8°S 144.8°E	<1 million years ago
Mingela	—	—	—	—
Mitchell Volcano	—	—	26.0°S 148.2°E	21–24 million years ago
Monto	—	—	—	—
Nebo Volcano	—	—	21.4°S 148.2°E	28–35 million years ago
Nulla Volcano	—	—	19.7°S 145.3°E	13,000 years ago
Piebald Volcano	417	—	15.1°S 145.1°E	<3 million years ago
Rockhampton Volcano	—	—	23.3°S 150.4°E	67–71 million years ago
Springsure	600	—	24.0°S 148.1°E	24–33 million years ago
Sturgeon Volcano	—	—	20.3°S 144.2°E	92,000 years ago
Toomba	—	—	19.5°S 145.0°E	21,000 years ago
Undara Crater	1,020	3,345	18.25°S 144.75°E	189,000 years ago
Wallaroo Volcano	—	—	18.0°S 145.4°E	<5 million years ago
Mount Barney, Focal Peak Volcano	1,359	4,958	28.17°S 152.42°E	—
Campbells Folly	—	—	—	—
Mount Pie	—	—	—	—
Mount Glennie	—	—	—	—
Levers Plateau	—	—	—	—
Glass House Mountains	—	—	—	26–27 million years ago
Mount Beerburrum	276	—	26.7°S 152.9°E	26–27 million years ago
Mount Beerwah	556	—	26.7°S 152.9°E	26–27 million years ago
Mount Coochin	235	—	26.7°S 152.9°E	26–27 million years ago
Mount Cooee	—	—	26.7°S 152.9°E	26–27 million years ago
Mount Coonowrin	377	—	26.7°S 152.9°E	26–27 million years ago
Mount Elimbah	129	—	26.7°S 152.9°E	26–27 million years ago
Mount Horogargan	—	—	26.7°S 152.9°E	26–27 million years ago
Mount Miketeebumulgrai	199	—	26.7°S 152.9°E	26–27 million years ago
Mount Ngungun	253	—	26.7°S 152.9°E	26–27 million years ago
Round Mountain	—	—	26.7°S 152.9°E	26–27 million years ago
Mount Tibberoowuccum	220	—	26.7°S 152.9°E	26–27 million years ago
Mount Tibrogargan	364	—	26.7°S 152.9°E	26–27 million years ago
Mount Tunbubudla	312	—	26.7°S 152.9°E	26–27 million years ago
Wild Horse Mountain	123	—	26.7°S 152.9°E	26–27 million years ago
Anvil Peak	—	—	22.8°S 148.0°E	27–35 million years ago
Table Mountain	—	—	22.8°S 148.0°E	27–35 million years ago
Murray Island	200	656	10.0°S 144.0°E	1 million years ago

=== New South Wales ===
Name	Elevation		Location	Last eruption
Name	metres	feet	Coordinates	Last eruption
Abercrombie Volcano	—	—	34.3°S 149.4°E	14–26 million years ago
Airly Volcano	—	—	32.9°S 150.1°E	34–42 million years ago
Barrington Volcano	—	—	31.8°S 151.2°E	44–54 million years ago
Bunda Bunda Volcano	—	—	31.1°S 152.4°E	71 million years ago
Byrock Volcano	—	—	30.7°S 146.3°E	17 million years ago
Mount Canobolas	1,395	—	33.3°S 149.0°E	12–13 million years ago
Cargelligo Volcano	—	—	33.4°S 146.5°E	15 million years ago
Central Volcano inc. Maybole Volcano and Gragin Peak	—	—	29.8°S 151.6°E	—
Comboyne Volcano	—	—	31.6°S 152.5°E	16–17 million years ago
Doughboy Volcano	—	—	30.3°S 152.2°E	38–45 million years ago
Dubbo Volcano	—	—	32.2°S 149.2°E	12–15 million years ago
Ebor Volcano	—	—	30.4°S 152.4°E	19–20 million years ago
El Capitan	—	—	31.2°S 146.2°E	18 million years ago
Mount Gulaga or Mount Dromedary	806	—	36.3°S 150.0°E	—
Mount Kaputar or Nandewar Volcano	1,507	—	30.2°S 150.1°E	17–18 million years ago
Liverpool Range	—	—	31.9°S 150.4°E	32–35 million years ago
Monaro	—	—	35.7°S 150.3°E	37–55 million years ago
Nerriga Volcano	—	—	35.2°S 149.8°E	50 million years ago
Snowy Mountains	—	—	35.5°S 148.3°E	17–22 million years ago
South Coast Volcano	—	—	35.7°S 150.3°E	26–31 million years ago
Southern Highlands Volcano	—	—	34.6°S 150.5°E	31–55 million years ago
Prospect Hill	—	—	33°49′30″S 150°55′5″E	80 million years ago
Walcha Volcano	—	—	31.4°S 151.8°E	44–56 million years ago
Mount Warning or Tweed Volcano	1,157	3,796	28°23′50″S 153°16′15″E	24–23 million years ago
Warrumbungles inc The Breadknife	—	—	31.3°S 149.0°E	13–17 million years ago

=== Victoria ===
Name	Elevation		Location	Last eruption
Name	metres	feet	Coordinates	Last eruption
Aberfeldy Volcano	—	—	37.8°S 146.4°E	27 million years ago
Budj Bim (Mt Eccles)	—	—	38.07°S 141.92°E	36.9 ±3.1 thousand years ago
Lake Bullen Merri	—	—	—	—
Mount Buninyong	744	—	—	—
Lake Colongulac	—	—	—	—
Cosgrove				9 million years ago
Dargo	—	—	—	—
Mount Pollock	184	—	38.17°S 144.07°E	5,000–20,000 years ago
Mount Duneed	102	—	38.24°S 144.32°E	5,000–20,000 years ago
Mount Elephant	395	—	37.96°S 143.20°E	5,000–20,000 years ago
Mount Eliza	395	—	37.96°S 143.20°E	5,000–20,000 years ago
Flinders Volcano	—	—	38.5°S 145.3°E	40–48 million years ago
Mount Franklin	635	—	—	470,000 years ago
Gelantipy Volcano	—	—	37.2°S 148.3°E	34–43 million years ago
Lake Gnotuk	—	—	—	—
Mount Hamilton	—	—	—	—
Howitt Volcano	—	—	37.2°S 146.7°E	32–36 million years ago
Lake Keilambete	—	—	—	—
Mount Kooroocheang	230	—	—	—
La Trobe Volcano	—	—	38.5°S 146.3°E	50–59 million years ago
Mount Leura	311	—	38.1°S 143.1°E	5,000–20,000 years ago
Mount Macedon	1,014	3,346	37.41°S 144.58°E	360 million years ago
Mount Moriac	270	—	38.25°S 144.16°E	5,000–20,000 years ago
Mount Napier	440	1,440	37.8°S 142.5°E	32,000 years ago
Neerim Volcano	—	—	38.0°S 146.0°E	20–25 million years ago
Mount Noorat	310	—	38.1769267°S 142.9276341°E	5,000–20,000 years ago
Poowong	—	—	—	—
Mount Porndon	278	—	38.18°S 143.17°E	300,000 years ago
Mount Rouse	367	1,204	37°52′56.7″S 142°18′2.2″E	300,000 years ago
Lake Purrumbete	—	—	—	—
Stockyard Hill	—	—	37.56°S 143.32°E	0.1–0.5 million years ago
The Anakies	—	—	37.55°S 144.10°E	1.5 million years ago
Toombullup Volcano	—	—	36.9°S 146.3°E	37–44 million years ago
Tower Hill, in Tower Hill State Game Reserve	103	338	38.3212°S 142.3597°E	36.8 ±3.8 thousand years ago
Uplands Volcano	—	—	36.8°S 147.6°E	2 million years ago
Mount Warrenheip	741	—	—	—
Mount Warrnambool	216	—	38.18°S 142.44°E	5,000–20,000 years ago
Newer Volcanics Province	—	—	37°46′S 142°30′E	—

=== South Australia ===
South Australia's volcanoes are the youngest in Australia, and erupted within the memory of local Indigenous peoples. They are all in the Limestone Coast region, in the Mount Burr Range. They are considered dormant rather than extinct.

Name	Elevation		Location	Last eruption
Name	metres	feet	Coordinates	Last eruption
Mount Burr	187	614	37.55°S 140.46°E	4,750 years ago
Mount Gambier	190	623	37.84°S 140.78°E	4,500 years ago
Mount Schank	158	518	37.94°S 140.74°E	5,000 years ago
Mount Muirhead	130	427	37.56°S 140.41°E	5,000 years ago

=== Western Australia ===
There are no active or dormant volcanoes in Western Australia, although there are a number of extinct ones, and geological evidence of others. There are nineteen small extinct volcanoes in the valley of the Fitzroy River in the Kimberley region of Western Australia. The Kimberley also has a number of groups of hot springs, which may be connected with the volcanic activity that produced the extinct volcanoes (but since these volcanic formations are Proterozoic in age – i.e. maybe a billion years old, this would be very unlikely). There are also deposits of basalt at Bunbury and Cape Gosselin.

Name	Elevation		Location	Last eruption
Name	metres	feet	Coordinates	Last eruption
Argyle diamond mine	—	—	16.6°S 128.3°E	1.58 million years ago

=== Tasmania ===
Name	Elevation		Location	Last eruption
Name	metres	feet	Coordinates	Last eruption
Table Cape	181	594	40.95°S 145.73°E	12 million years ago
The Nut	143	469	40.76°S 145.3°E	25–70 million years ago
Hillwood Volcano	115	377	41.21°S 146.95°E	250 million years ago
Lune River	—	—	43.25°S 146.54°E	180 million years ago
Mount Charter	514	1,686	41°37′21″S 145°40′32″E	500 million years ago
Mount Tor	1,105	3,625	41°25′53″S 145°53′34″E	500 million years ago
Mount Julia	843	2,766	41°53′3″S 145°33′50″E	500 million years ago
Mount Cripps	943	3,094	41°34′49″S 145°45′59″E	500 million years ago
Mount Read Volcanics	1,123	3,684	41.50°S 145.32°E	500 million years ago

== Territories ==
=== Australian Capital Territory ===
Name	Elevation		Location	Last eruption
Name	metres	feet	Coordinates	Last eruption
Mount Stromlo	770	2,530	35°19′0″S 149°1′0″E	Silurian period

=== Heard and McDonald Islands ===
Name	Elevation		Location	Last eruption
Name	metres	feet	Coordinates	Last eruption
Anzac Peak	715	2,346	52°59′32″S 73°17′58″E	—
Big Ben (Mawson Peak)	2,745	9,006	53°6′0″S 73°31′0″E	2023
Mount Dixon	715	2,346	53°0′S 73°17′E	—
McDonald Islands	230	755	53.03°S 72.60°E	2005

=== Lord Howe Island ===
Name	Elevation		Location	Last eruption
Name	metres	feet	Coordinates	Last eruption
Ball's Pyramid	562	1,844	31°45′07″S 159°15′05″E	—
Mount Gower	875	2,870	31°34′51″S 159°04′54″E	—

=== Australian Antarctic Territory ===
Name	Elevation		Location	Last eruption
Name	metres	feet	Coordinates	Last eruption
Gaussberg	370	1,214	66°48′S 89°1′E	—

=== Norfolk Island ===
Norfolk Island and neighbouring Nepean Island and Phillip Island are mountain top remnants of an elongated shield volcano.

== Tasman Sea ==
Name	Elevation		Location	Last eruption
Name	metres	feet	Coordinates	Last eruption
Bass Strait Basin	—	—	—	—
Tasman Seamounts	—	—	—	—
Barcoo Seamount	—	—	—	—
Britannia Seamount	—	—	—	—
Derwent-Hunter Seamount	—	—	—	—
Gascoyne Seamount	—	—	—	—
Heemskirk Seamount	—	—	—	—
Queensland Seamount	—	—	—	—
Soela Seamount	—	—	—	—
Taupo Seamount	—	—	—	—
Zeelian Seamount	—	—	—	—

== Other ==
Name	Elevation		Location	Last eruption
Name	metres	feet	Coordinates	Last eruption
Macquarie Island	433	1,421	54.50°S 158.95°E	—
Norfolk Island	315	1,033	29°S 168°E	2.4 million years ago
