= List of shield volcanoes =

This list of shield volcanoes includes active, dormant and extinct shield volcanoes. Shield volcanoes are one of the three types of volcanoes. They have a short cone shape, and have basaltic lava which means the lava has low viscosity (viscosity is a measure of the ability for a liquid to flow)

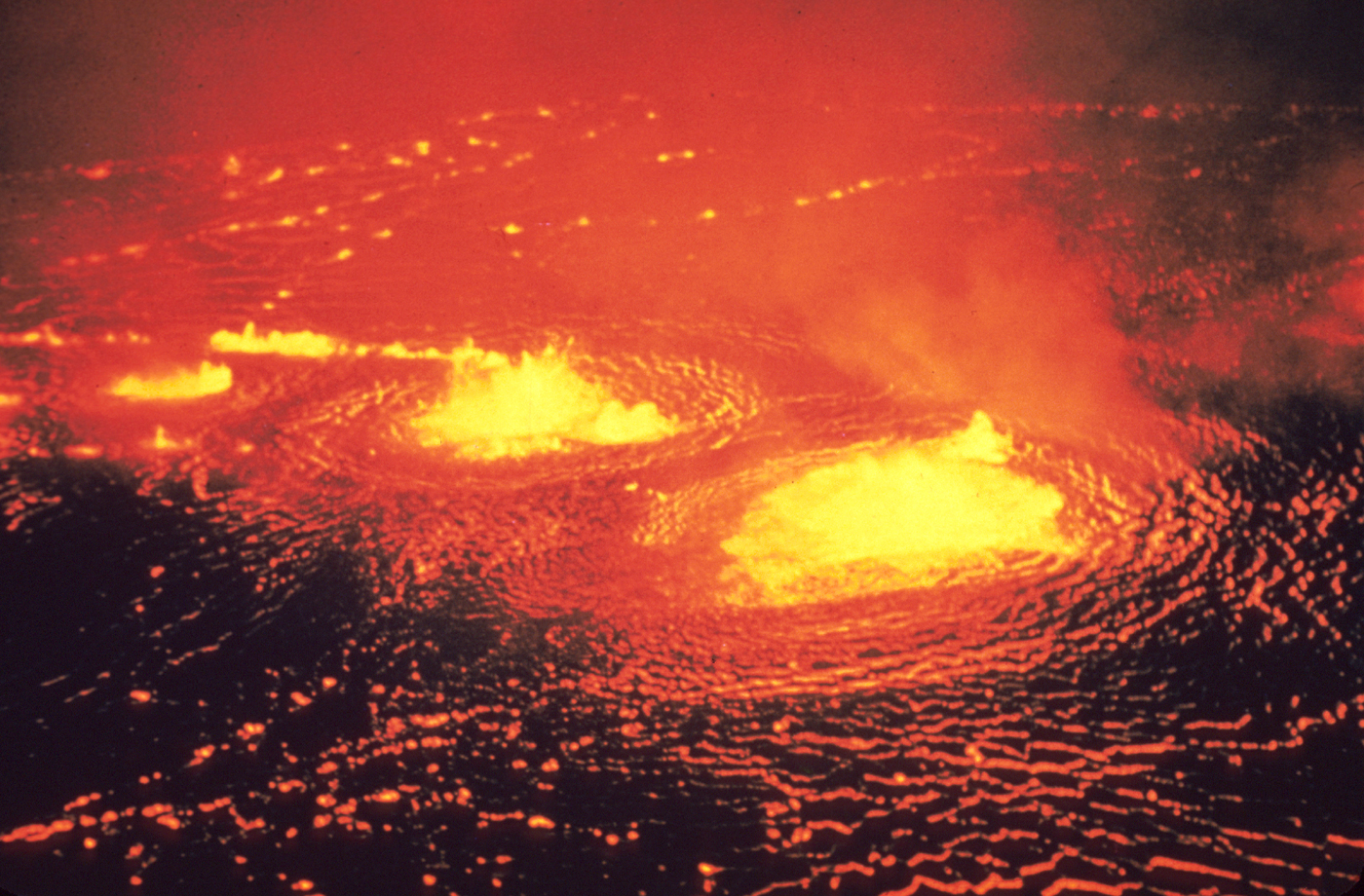
Eruption of Kīlauea in 1954

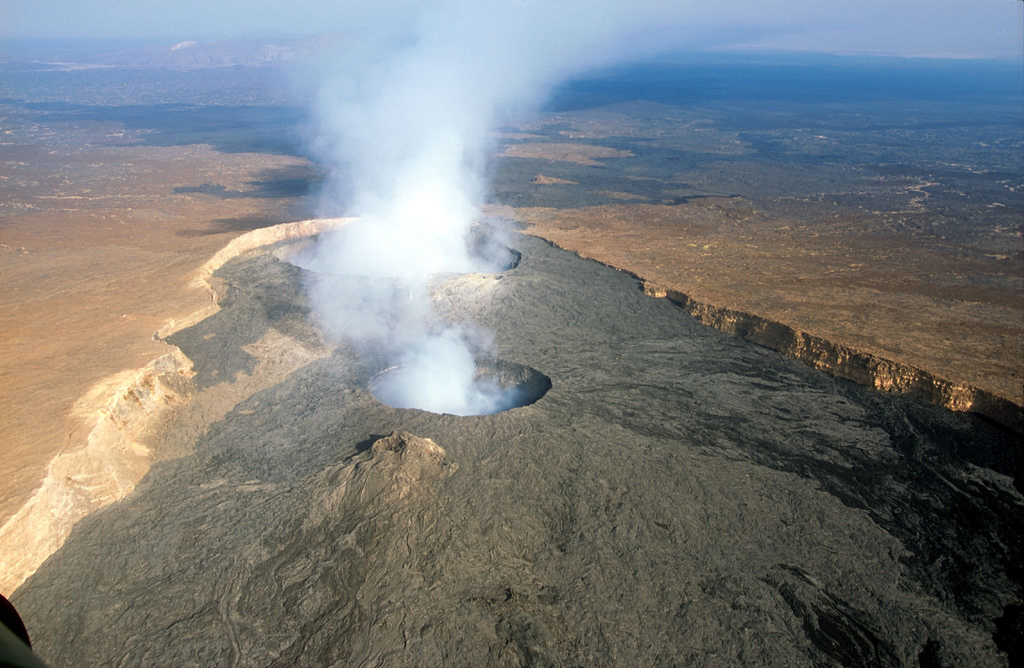
Erta Ale

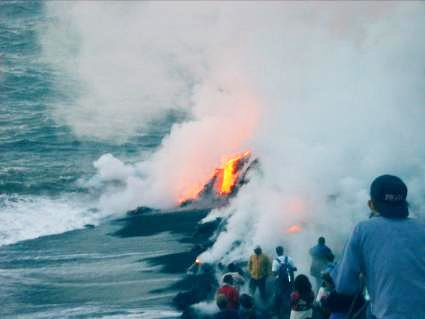
The erupting lava from Piton de la Fournaise met the water of the Indian Ocean during the August 2004 eruption.

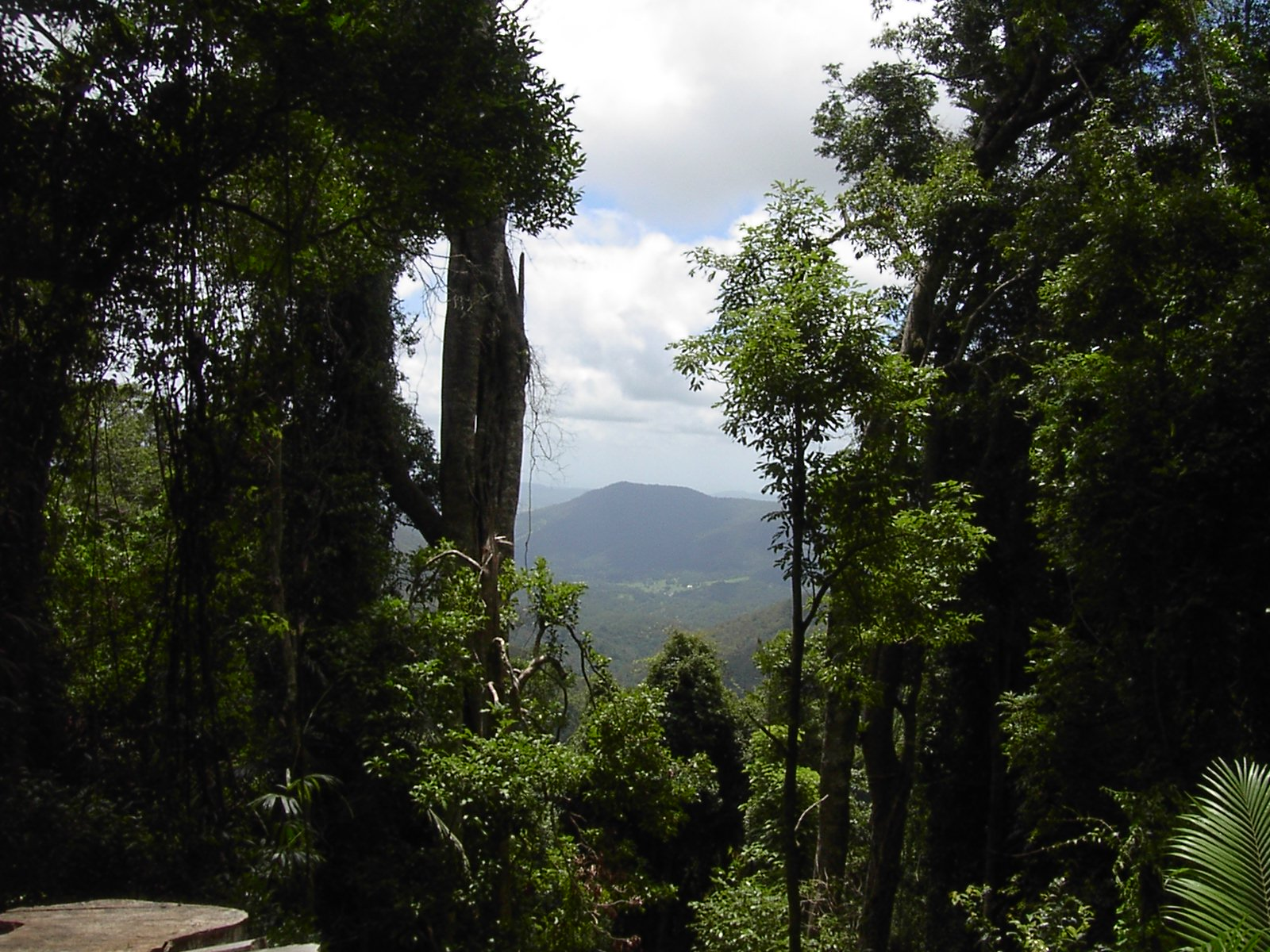
On the path to the summit of Mount Warning

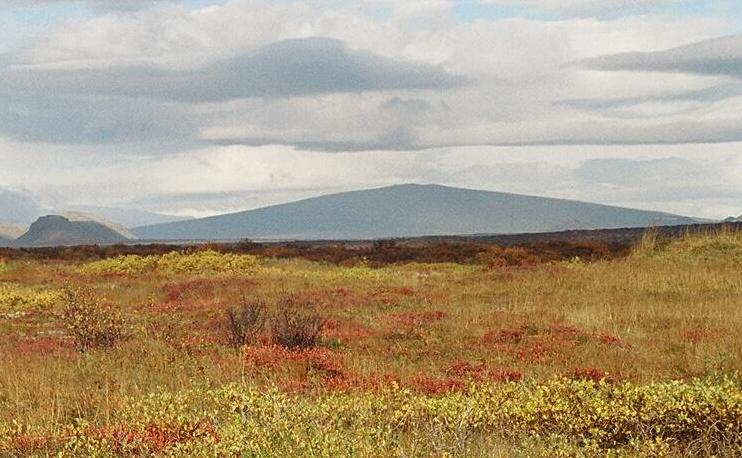
Skjaldbreiður as seen from Þingvellir

== Active ==
=== Ecuador ===
- Alcedo, Isabella Island, Galápagos Islands
- La Cumbre, Fernandina Island, Galápagos Islands
- Sierra Negra, Isabella Island, Galápagos Islands
- Cerro Azul, Isabella Island, Galápagos Islands
- Wolf, Isabella Island, Galápagos Islands
- Marchena Island, Galápagos Islands
- Darwin, Darwin Island, Galápagos Islands

=== Other ===
- Lava plateau of the Mount Edziza volcanic complex (British Columbia, Canada)
- Barrier (Kenya)
- Bottom half of Mount Erebus (Ross Dependency, Antarctica)
- Erta Ale (Ethiopia)
- Bottom half of Mount Etna (Sicily, Italy)
- Mount Wrangell (Alaska)
- Mount Karthala (Comoros)
- Namarunu (Kenya)
- Niuafo'ou (Tonga)
- Mount Nyamuragira (Democratic Republic of the Congo)
- Piton de la Fournaise (Réunion, France)
- Manaro Voui, Vanuatu
- Masaya Volcano, Nicaragua
- Kīlauea, Hawaii, US
- Mauna Loa, Hawaii
- Mount Halla (Jeju Island, South Korea)
- Mascarin Peak (Marion Island, South Africa)

== Dormant ==
=== Canada ===
- Heart Peaks
- Itcha Range (British Columbia, Canada)
- Lava plateau of Level Mountain (British Columbia, Canada)

=== United States ===
- Arlington Cone (Arizona)
- Belknap Crater (Oregon)
- Gillespie Volcano (Arizona)
- Haleakalā (Maui)
- Hell's Half Acre (Idaho)
- House Mountain (Arizona)
- Hualālai (Hawaii)
- Indian Heaven (Washington)
- Larch Mountain (Oregon)
- Mauna Kea (Hawaii)
- Medicine Lake Volcano (California)
- Newberry Volcano (Oregon)
- Pelican Butte (Oregon)
- Shoshone Lava Field (Idaho)
- The Three Sisters (Oregon)
- Wapi Lava Field (Idaho)

=== Costa Rica ===
- Tilarán

=== Kenya ===
- Mount Marsabit
- Menengai

=== Other ===
- La Grille (Comoros)
- Mt. Bar le Duc (Mauritius)
- Queen Mary's Peak (South Atlantic Ocean)
- Rangitoto Island (New Zealand)
- Santorini (Greece)
- São Tomé (São Tomé and Príncipe, Atlantic Ocean)
- Skjaldbreiður (Iceland)
- Kollóttadyngja (Iceland)
- Trölladyngja (Iceland)
- Mount Takahe (Marie Byrd Land, Antarctica)
- Taveuni (Fiji)
- Karaca Dağ (Turkey)

== Extinct ==
=== Antarctica ===
- Mount Andrus
- Mount Berlin
- Mount Moulton
- Mount Sidley (Marie Byrd Land)
- Mount Terror (Ross Dependency)

=== Other ===
- Ball's Pyramid of Australia is a volcanic plug, or an erosional remnant of a shield volcano.
- Banks Peninsula (Christchurch, New Zealand)
- Bermuda Pedestal (Bermuda, United Kingdom)
- Dunedin Volcano (Dunedin, New Zealand)
- Kohala (Hawaii, United States)
- Kookooligit Mountains (St. Lawrence Island, Alaska, United States)
- Mormon Mountain (Arizona, United States)
- House Mountain (Arizona, United States)
- Hackberry Mountain (Arizona, United States)
- Lord Howe Island, (Australia)
- Mount Piton (Piton, Mauritius)
- Piton des Neiges (Réunion, France)
- Poike (Easter Island, Chile)
- Pūhāhonu, Hawaii – the largest shield volcano on Earth by volume
- Rano Kau (Easter Island, Chile)
- Slieve Gullion (Northern Ireland, United Kingdom)
- Terevaka (Easter Island, Chile)
- Topo Volcano, Azores, Portugal
- Tweed Volcano, Australia
- Mount Charter, Australia
- Mount Tor, Australia
- Mount Julia, Australia
- Mount Cripps, Australia
- Verkhovoy (Kamchatka Peninsula, Russia.)

== Other planets and satellites ==
=== Mars & Venus ===
- Alba Mons
- Olympus Mons
- Arsia Mons
- Ascraeus Mons
- Pavonis Mons
- Syrtis Major Planum
- Maat Mons
- Theia Mons

Io

Io, a moon of Jupiter, has several volcanoes that spew sulphur. Some of these include Pele and Tohil Mons.

== Pyroclastic shields ==
=== Bolivia ===
- Sacabaya
- Tata Sabaya

=== Nicaragua ===
- Apoyeque
- Masaya

=== Papua New Guinea ===
- Rabaul, New Britain

=== Other ===
- Ambrym, Vanuatu
- Purico Complex, Chile
- Taal Volcano, Philippines

== See also ==
- List of stratovolcanoes
- List of subglacial volcanoes
- List of cinder cones
- List of lava domes
- Shield volcano
