= Mount Pollock, Victoria =

Mountain in Victoria, Australia

Mount Pollock
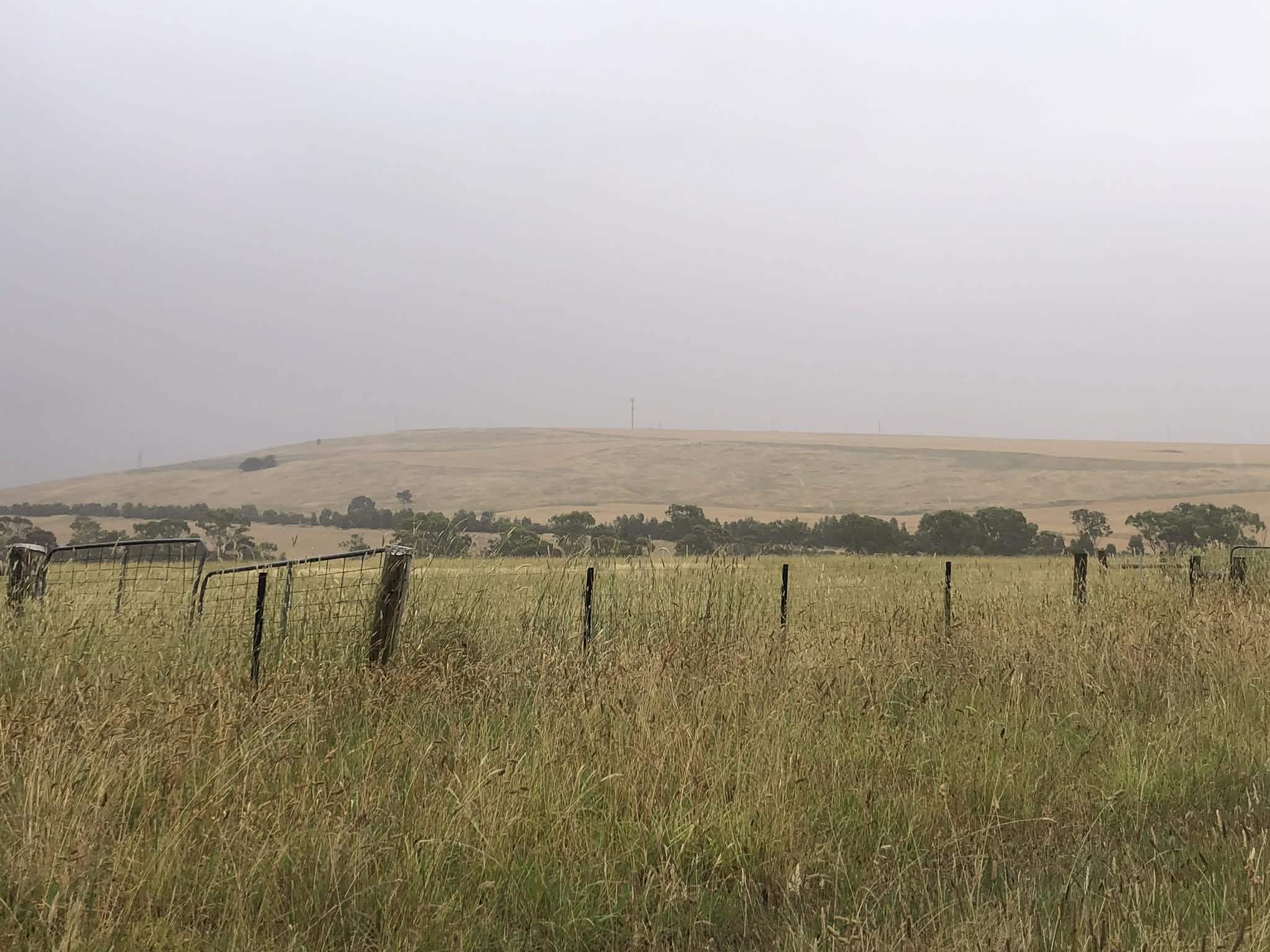
- Mount Pollock, December 2025

Highest point
- Elevation: 184 metres (604 ft) AHD
- Prominence: 51 m (167 ft)
- Listing: Mountains of Victoria
- Coordinates: 38°9′55.44″S 144°4′24.369″E

Geography
- Location within Victoria
- Country: Australia
- State: Victoria
- Parent range: Barrabool Hills

Climbing
- Easiest route: Private land-access track

Mount Pollock is a small, extinct volcanic outcrop located between Inverleigh and Gnarwarre, within the Barrabool Hills, Victoria, Australia. Although modest in heigh compared with other volcanic features of the region, it sits within the ancient Western Volcanic Plains that make up part of the Newer Volcanics Province, a vast volcanic field of hundreds of eruption points across south-eastern Australia. The mountain is named after Captain Joseph Stephen Pollock, one of the district's early squatters.

== History ==
The first European squatter in the area was likely Captain Joseph Stephen Pollock in 1837, who slowly moved westward towards present-day Colac, where he set up his run, known as Pollock's Station (later renamed 'Watch Hill').

According to a heritage study of the area, a small building was used at the foot of the northern side of the mountain as a stop over for stockmen, with another farmhouse built in the early 1900s.

Additionally, a small school operated beneath the mountain. The Mount Pollock National School, opened on 1 December 1858, with an average attendance of 19 pupils. The first head teacher was Thomas W. Spencer. In 1863, the school received its numerical designation as '399', but funding was discontinued on 31 May 1868. The school later received funding from the local Board of Education, but as the Rural School No. 88. The school closed on 18 January 1874.

Mount Pollock has also featured in modern land-use and planning discussions, most notably in relation to proposed wind energy developments in the surrounding district. In Russell and Ors v Surf Coast Shire Council and Anor (2009), Mount Pollock and its surrounding rural landscape formed part of the broader contextual setting assessed by the Victorian Civil and Administrative Tribuanl when weighing planning controls, landscape character, and community concerns associated with wind energy infrastructure in the area.

== Features ==
The summit is located on private farmland. Atop the summit is a trig point, and two GPS transmission towers, which are used by the local farmers in order to use GPS-controlled agricultural machinery. To the north of the mountain lies a piggery, and a broilery to the south-west.

== See also ==
- Mount Elephant
- Mount Rouse
