= Mount Napier State Park =

- IUCN category II (national park)
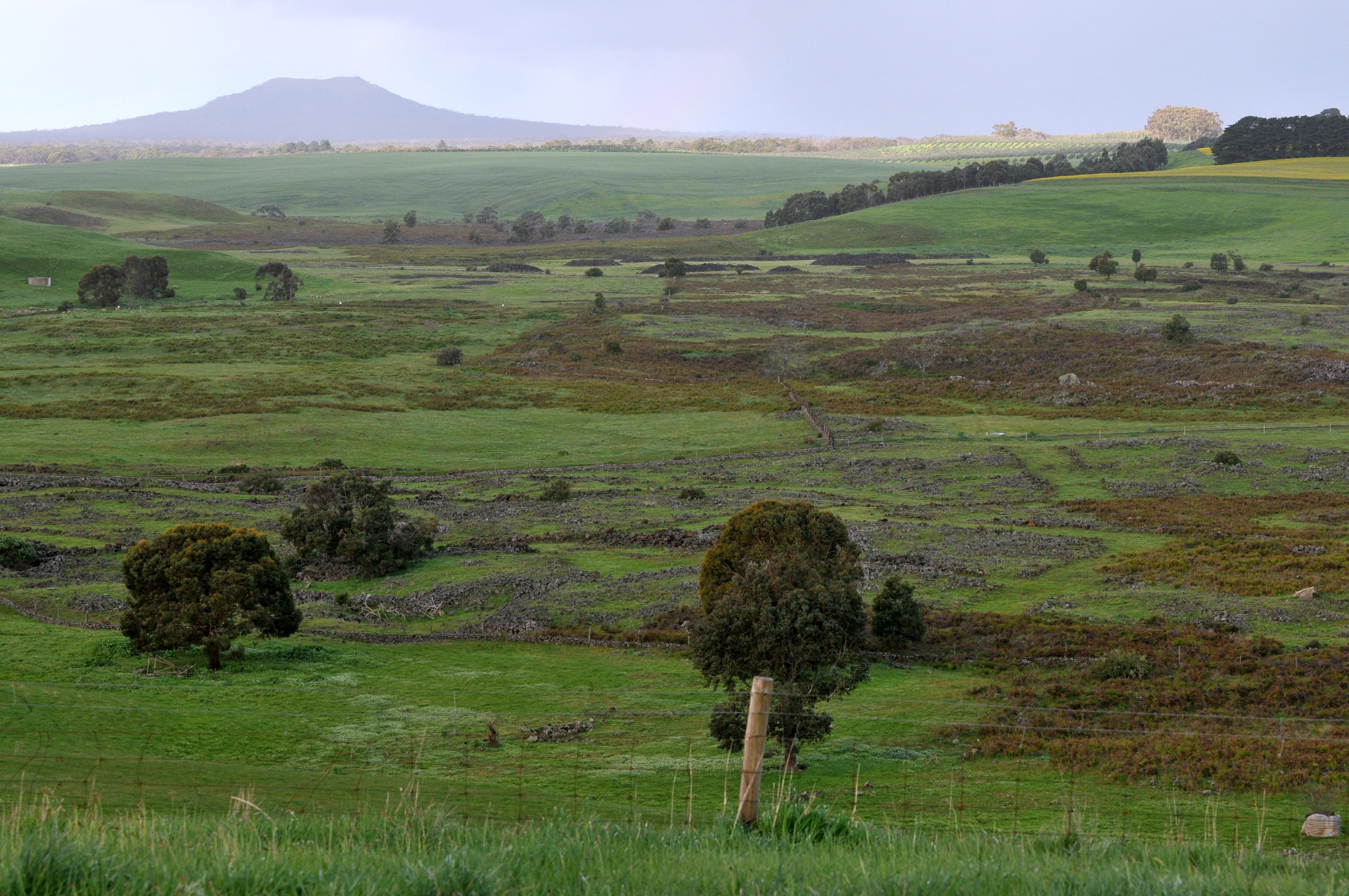
- Mount Napier

- Location within Victoria
- Location: Victoria
- Nearest city: Hamilton
- Coordinates: 37.894°S 142.059°E
- Area: 28 km^{2} (11 sq mi)
- Established: 1987
- Governing body: Parks Victoria
- Website: Official website

Mount Napier State Park is a state park in the Australian state of Victoria. It is 20 km northeast of Mount Eccles; its centerpiece is Mount Napier, a true volcanic cone, and one of the youngest volcanoes in Australia. The park was established in 1987, and today encompasses 2800 hectares of land. The local Aboriginal name for Mount Napier is Tapoc.

== See also ==
- List of volcanoes in Australia
