= Kinrara (volcano) =

Volcano in Australia

- Location within Queensland

Highest point
- Coordinates: 18°24′50″S 144°54′55″E

Geography
- Location: Queensland, Australia

Geology
- Last eruption: Holocene era

Kinrara is a volcano in Queensland, Australia. It is one of the youngest volcanoes in Australia, and erupted 7,000 years ago (± 2000 years).

== Eruption ==
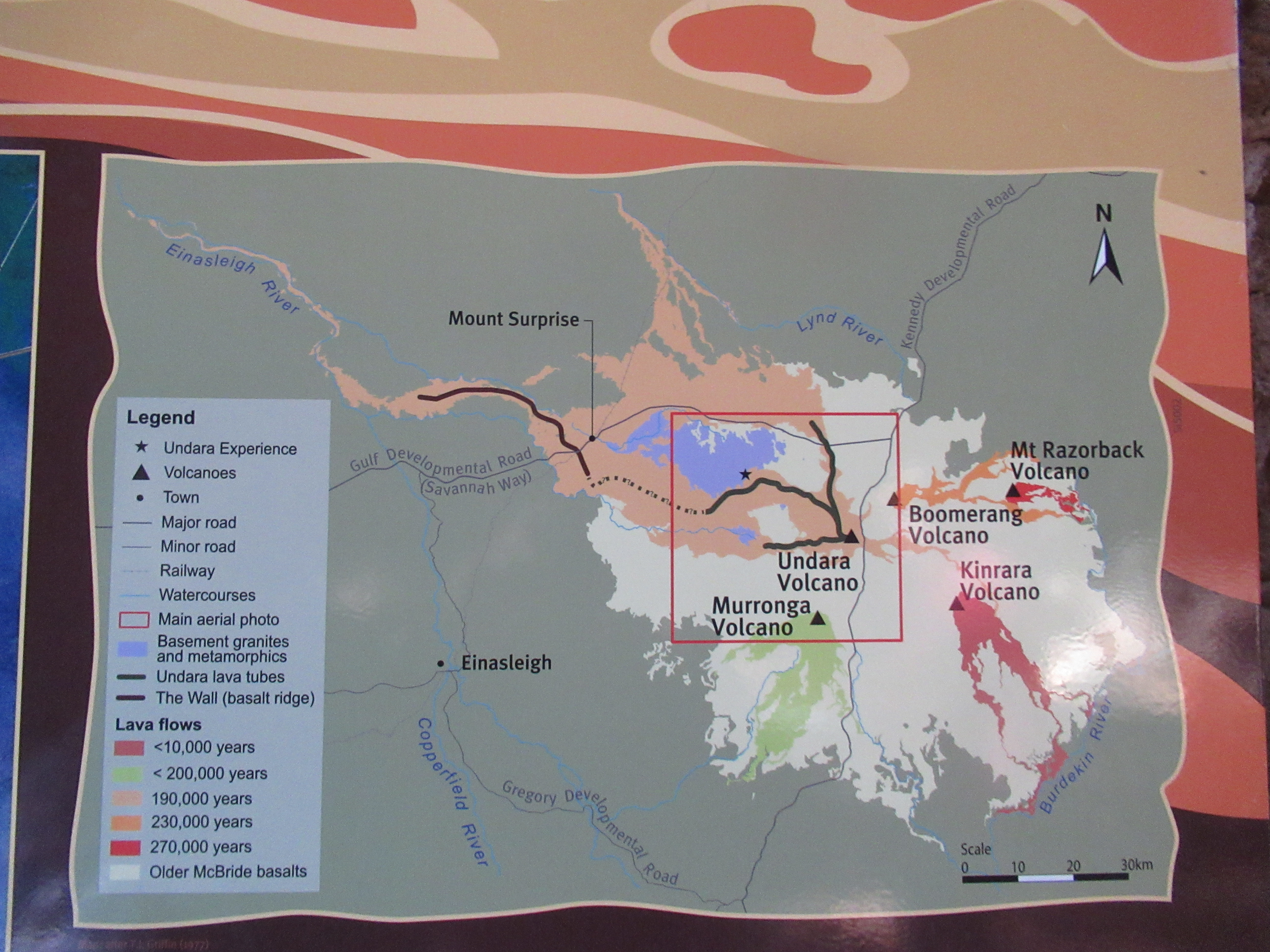
Kinrara volcano on the southeastern flank of the McBride volcanic province.

Lavas flowed 55 km from the crater, and cover 173 km^{2}. According to one study, the Gugu-Badhun people have oral traditions that may describe the volcano erupting, equivalent to around 230 ± 70 generations ago.

== Geography ==
Wetlands at the Valley of Lagoons occur around the boundary between the Kinrara flow and the Burdekin River.

== See also ==
- List of volcanoes in Australia
