= Anzac Peak =

Mountain on Heard Island

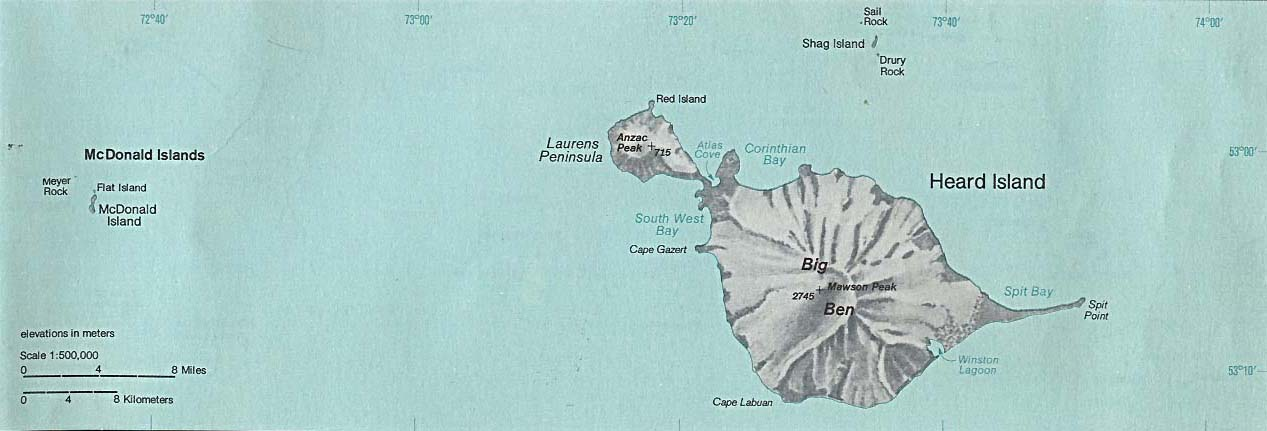
- Map of Heard Island and McDonald Islands in the Southern Ocean

Highest point
- Elevation: 715 m (2,346 ft)
- Prominence: 715 m (2,346 ft)
- Coordinates: 52°59′32″S 73°17′58″E

Geography
- Location: Heard Island, Southern Ocean

Anzac Peak is a 715-metre-high (2,346 ft) volcano on the Laurens Peninsula of Heard Island in the Southern Ocean. It lies to the northwest of Mawson Peak. Despite its low elevation of just over 700 metres high, the peak and several neighbouring peaks have permanent snow and ice, like the Jacka Glacier with several icefalls.

== See also ==
- List of volcanoes in Antarctica
- List of volcanoes in Australia
