= Mount Rouse =

Mountain in Victoria, Australia

- Collorrer
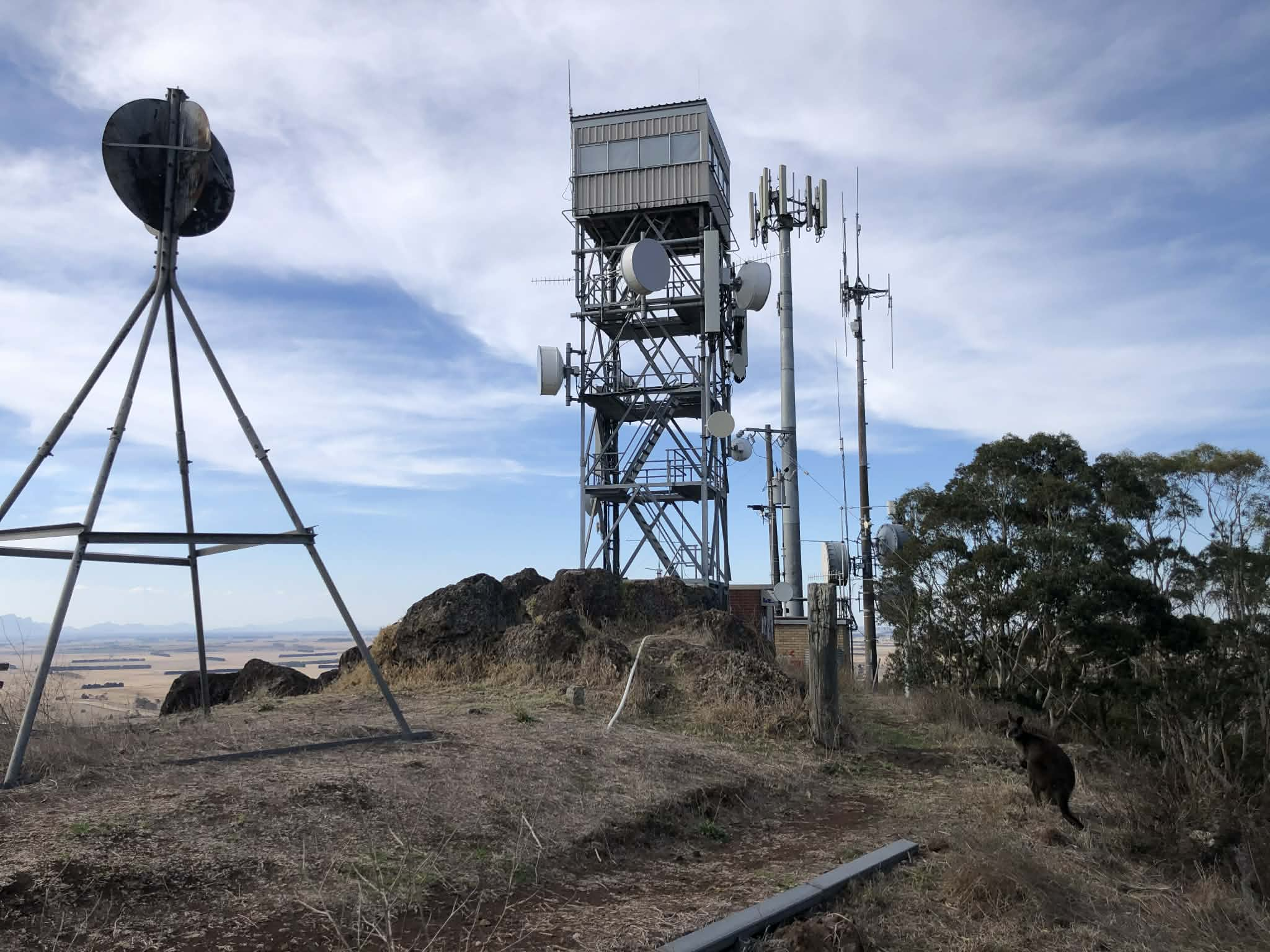
- The summit of Mount Rouse

Highest point
- Elevation: 367 metres (1,204 ft) AHD
- Prominence: 145 m (476 ft)
- Listing: Mountains of Victoria
- Coordinates: 37°52′56.7″S 142°18′2.2″E

Geography
- Location within Victoria
- Country: Australia
- State: Victoria

Geology
- Mountain type: Composite scoria cone

Climbing
- Easiest route: Hike

Mount Rouse (Djab Wurrung: Collorrer) is an extinct volcano and prominent geological landmark located immediately next to Penshurst in the Southern Grampians Shire of western Victoria, Australia. Rising to 367 metres above sea level and 145 metres above the surrounding volcanic plain, it is one of the most significant volcanic features in the Newer Volcanics Province, an extensive volcanic field that covers much of south-western Victoria. The mountain and its surrounding area are protected as the Mount Rouse and Crater Reserve and are significant for their geological, cultural, ecological, and historical values.

== Geology ==
Mount Rouse is a large composite scoria cone volcano, consisting predominantly of accumulated red and brown scoria interbedded with basaltic lava flows that emanated from multiple eruption points. The main scoria cone has a distinctive breached form opening toward the south-west, characteristic of eruption dynamics that combined explosive scoria ejection with lava effusion.

To the south of the principal cone lies a deep circular crater, often referred to as the Dry Crater or Crater Lake, which frequently contains water at its lowest levels and is rimmed by basalt. A smaller, shallow basalt-rimmed crater also lies nearby. The lava flows from Mount Rouse spread extensively across the surrounding landscape, following gentle slopes and shallow creek courses, and at one stage have been traced for distances of up to 60 kilometres toward the southern coast near Port Fairy. Some of these lava flows are dated to approximately 1.8 million years old, suggesting that Mount Rouse may represent one of the earliest volcanic centres of the Newer Volcanics Province.

One of the most geologically unusual and scientifically significant deposits associated with Mount Rouse occurs within the Old Railway Quarry, immediately adjacent to the Mount Rouse Reserve. Quarrying here has exposed ancient lava flows and surge deposits containing abundant examples of Pele's hairs and Pele's tears, fragile volcanic glass formations usually associated with vigorous fire fountaining and explosive basaltic eruptions. Pele's hairs are extremely thin strands of volcanic glass that form when molten basaltic material is ejected into the air and drawn out by wind or eruption dynamics, cooling into hair-life filaments. Pele's tears, also found in the quarry, are tiny droplets of basaltic glass that solidified while airborne, often showing a teardrop shape. Both features provide vulcanologists with insights into the conditions of eruption (such as the velocity of magma discharge and the cooling environment) and are internationally rare. The preservation of these features at Mount Rouse is considered exceptional because they typically break apart during turbulent volcanic surges and their intact presence here suggest unusual eruption dynamics and rapid cooling within the local deposit.

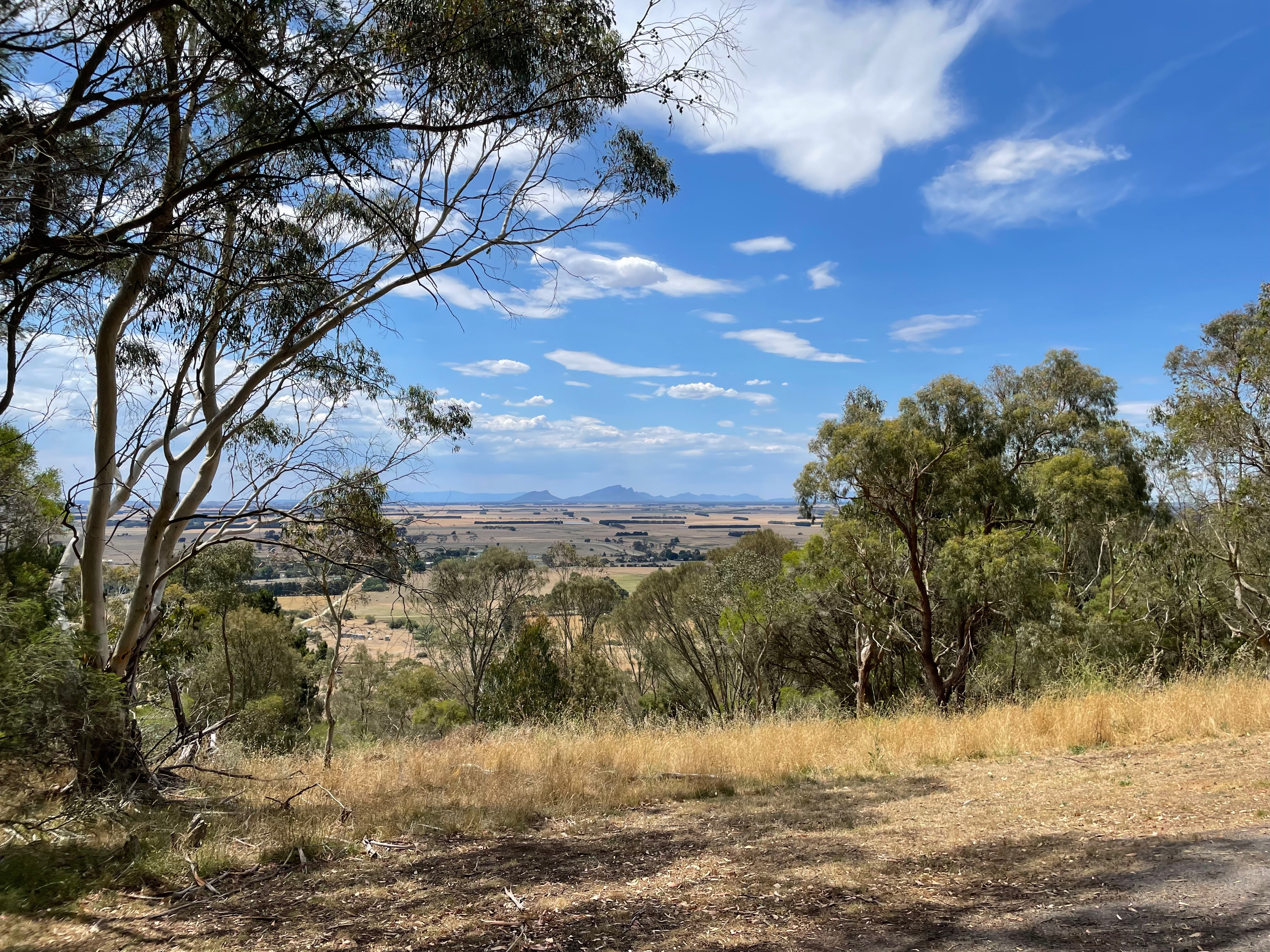
Looking north to Gariwerd the Grampians from Collorrer Mount Rouse

== History ==
Mount Rouse was first sighted by European explorers during Major Thomas Mitchell's Australia Felix expedition of 1836, and he is believed to have named the peak after Richard Rouse, an early settler from New South Wales. The area around Mount Rouse was long inhabited by Aboriginal peoples, probably including the Kolor Aboriginal group, who utilised the springs and volcanic landscape for shelter and water. Early colonial settlement around Mount Rouse included a sheep run established by John Cox in 1838, and the region later became the location of the Mount Rouse Aboriginal Protectorate, although it eventually failed and the land was opened for pastoral use in the 1850s. The adjacent town of Penshurst developed largely around these early settlement patterns.

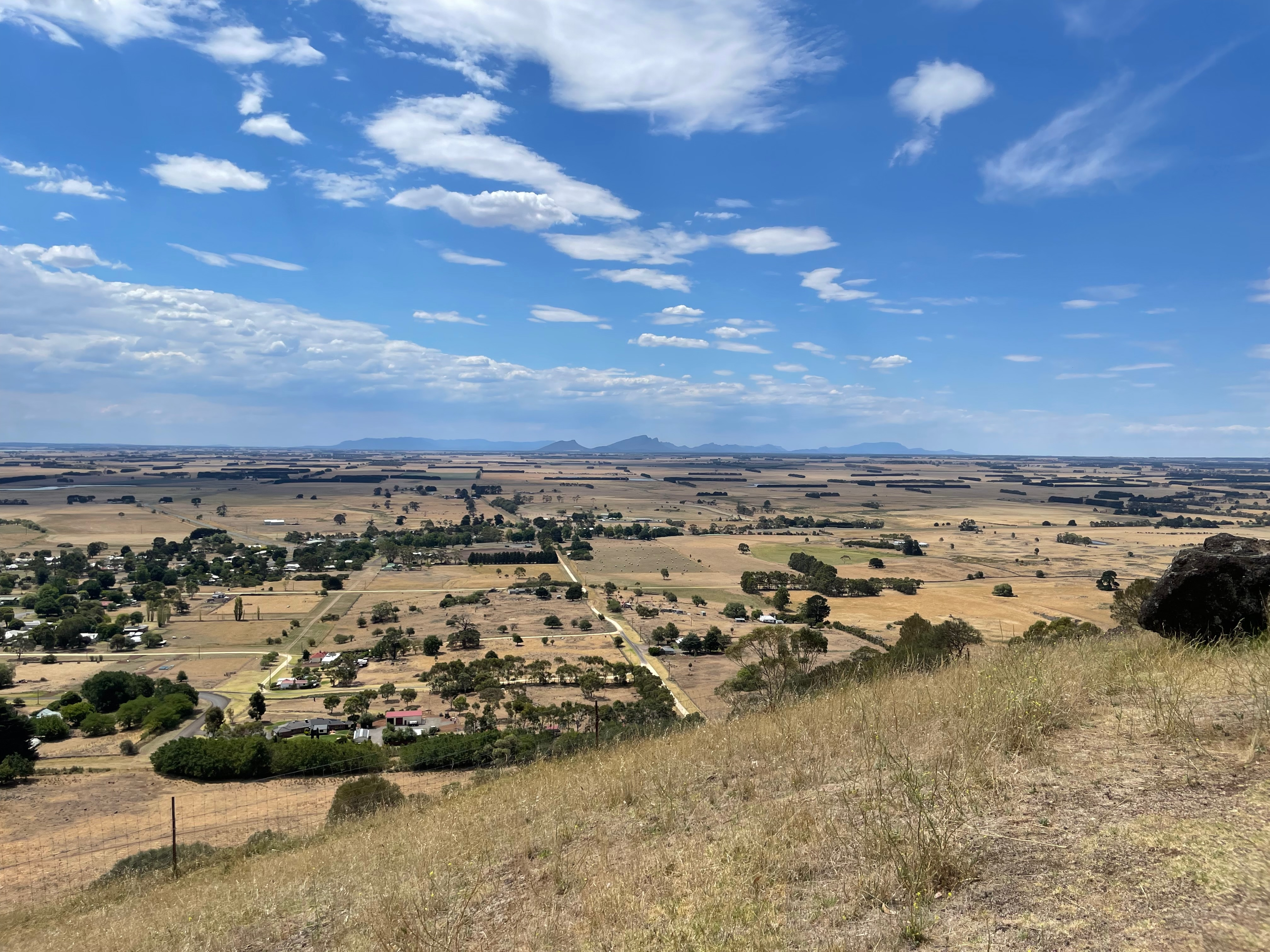
Another view north to Gariwerd the Grampians from Collorrer Mount Rouse

In 1855 the painter Eugene von Guérard, was on his way home to Melbourne by ship from a tour of South Australia. He got off the steamer at Portland and headed north to Mt Rouse where he made his first sketches of the Grampians. The sketches made there (which can be viewed here) enabled the 1861 painting View of the Grampians and Victoria Ranges from Mount Rouse, West Victoria held by the National Gallery of Victoria. It was on his return to the coast that he was commissioned to paint Tower Hill.

In the mid-19th century, land around Mount Rouse was reserved as a public park and water reserve. The reserve was gazetted in 1870, and the Mount Rouse Shire Council was appointed trustee, later overseeing efforts to manage erosion and vegetation throughout the late 19th century. European agricultural settlement intensified in the surrounding plains, with the reserve forming a natural landmark and community resource.

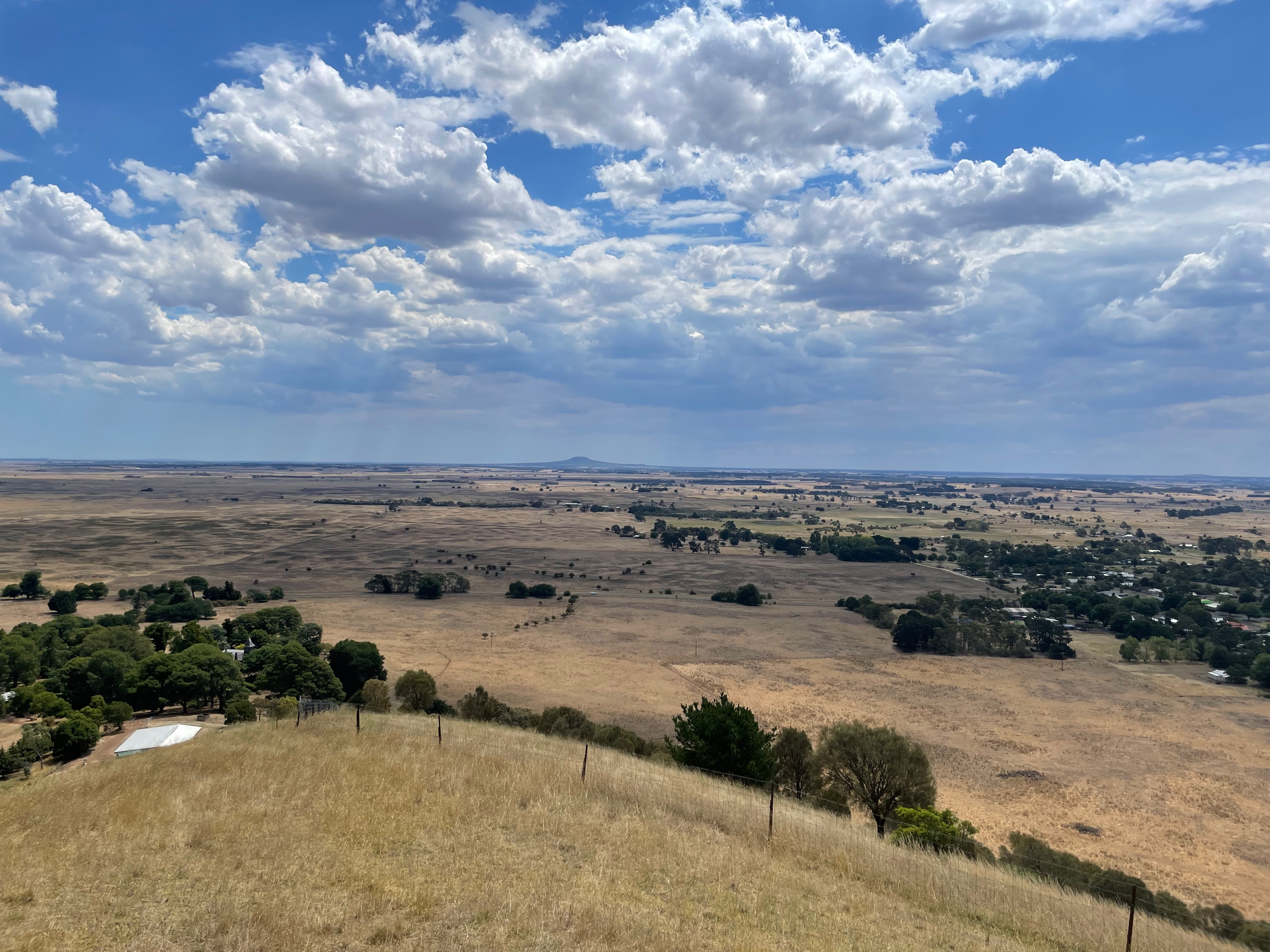
Tapoc Mount Napier from Collorrer Mount Rouse

== Reserve and Recreation ==
Today, much of Mount Rouse and its crater area is protected as the Mount Rouse and Crater Reserve, encompassing approximately 51 hectares of public parkland and natural environment. The reserve includes planted vegetation of native species and Monterey pines (Pinus radiata) on upper slopes, though much of the lower slopes remain cleared pastoral land. A sealed tourist road provides access to a viewing platform near the summit, and facilities such as car parks and picnic areas support recreational use. A fire watch tower is located atop the summit to support local fire management operations.

Visitors can explore walking trails that traverse the volcanic terrain, as well as up to the summit, offering panoramic views of the Western District plains, nearby volcanoes, The Grampians, and surrounding farmlands. A walking track leads from the viewing area down into the crater, where an aforementioned swamp may be present depending on seasonal conditions.

== Quarrying ==
Portions of Mount Rouse have been subject to quarrying, particularly on its north-east face, where basalt and scoria were extracted for use in road making, railway ballast, construction, and other civil engineering projects throughout the region. At least five quarries have been operated on or near the slopes of Mount Rouse, contributing to the local economy and providing materials for communities in the region and beyond. The Mount Rouse Quarries have been heritage-listed.

== See also ==
- List of mountains in Australia § Victoria
- List of volcanoes in Australia
