= Mount Warrnambool =

Mountain in Victoria, Australia

- Location within Victoria

Highest point
- Coordinates: 38°18′30″S 142°44′30″E

Geology
- Last eruption: over 5,000 years ago

Mount Warrnambool is a single large scoria cone volcano that is 216 metres (709 ft) high. It is 16 kilometres (10 mi) south-west of Terang, Victoria, Australia. It is visible from the Princes Highway on the way to Warrnambool.

== Volcano ==
Mount Warrnambool is an outstanding example of complex volcanic activity featuring lava flows, a maar eruption and Strombolian-type activity. The last eruption of Mount Warrnambool was over 5,000 years ago. Lava and tuff form layers in the area. The tuff forms a partial ring around the east and north sides of the volcano. The ring of tuff could be on other sides of the volcano too, except that it is covered in lava. The tuff has been quarried on the north side of the Princes Highway. The tuff here is hardened, but was formed due to volcanic ash falling from the air. Structures visible in the quarry include a base surge and volcanic bomb sag.

The basalt below the tuff has been dated at 2.2 Ma. A basalt layer on top of the tuff was dated at 0.57 Ma.

There is a small parcel of public land at the summit. An access track to a fire tower on the summit is not open to public.

== See also ==
- List of mountains in Australia § Victoria
- List of volcanoes in Australia
