= Mount Napier =

Mountain in Victoria, Australia

Mount Napier (Tapoc)
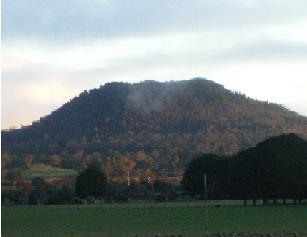
- Mount Napier/Tapoc, pictured in 2006.

Highest point
- Elevation: 440 metres (1,440 ft) AHD
- Prominence: 150 metres (490 ft) AHD
- Listing: Volcanoes in Australia
- Coordinates: 37°53′36″S 142°3′29″E

Geography
- Location within Victoria

Geology
- Volcanic zone: Newer Volcanics Province

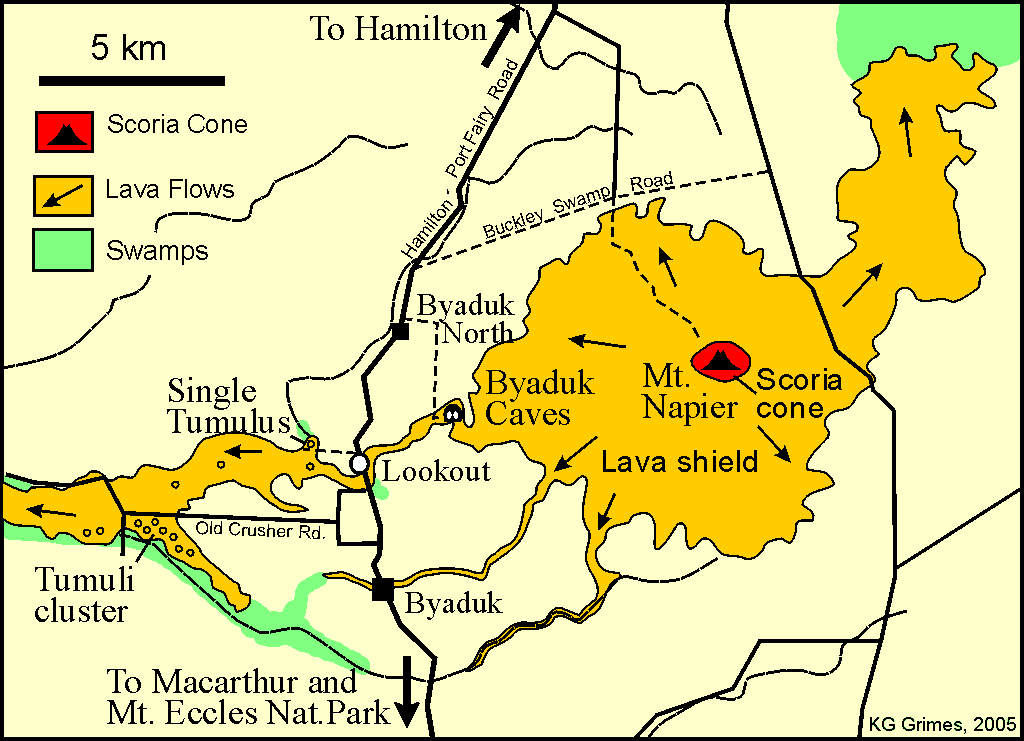
Map of the Mt Napier volcano and lava flow.

Mount Napier in Victoria, Australia, is one of the youngest volcanoes in Australia. It erupted about 32,000 years ago. It was named by Major Thomas Mitchell after the three Napier brothers, who he had served alongside during the Peninsular War. Mitchell named it in August 1836, during his third expedition across south-eastern Australia. The local Aboriginal name for the mountain is Tapoc. Mount Napier State Park is located 270 kilometres west of Melbourne and 17 km south of Hamilton.

== Location and features ==
Mount Napier, or Tapoc in the local Aboriginal language, has a composite lava shield with a superimposed scoria cone. The cone rises 150 metres (490 ft) above the surrounding plains to an elevation of 440 metres (1,440 ft), making it the highest point on the Western District Plains of Victoria. Mount Napier is part of the Newer Volcanics Province, which is the youngest volcanic region in Australia. The Newer Volcanics Province covers an area of 15,000 square kilometres (6,000 sq mi) and contains over 400 vents.

The Mount Napier Lava Flow followed the Harman Valley west from the volcano, and then south towards the nearby Mount Eccles which is 25 km south-west of Mount Napier. Lava blisters or tumuli occur along the flow – these are house-sized mounds of basalt rocks. The blisters are the best developed in Australia and uncommon in the rest of the world. They are formed by the pressure of liquid lava pushing up against the crust. Several caves and lava tubes can also be found at Byaduk.

The native vegetation of Mount Napier State Park, on the western side of the mountain, varies from grassy woodland to tall open forest dominated by manna gum Eucalyptus viminalis, blackwood Acacia melanoxylon, austral bracken Pteridium esculentum and common tussock grass Poa labillardieri. This hosts a variety of native fauna, including birds, marsupials and mammals, including bats (Bird 1997).

== Gallery ==
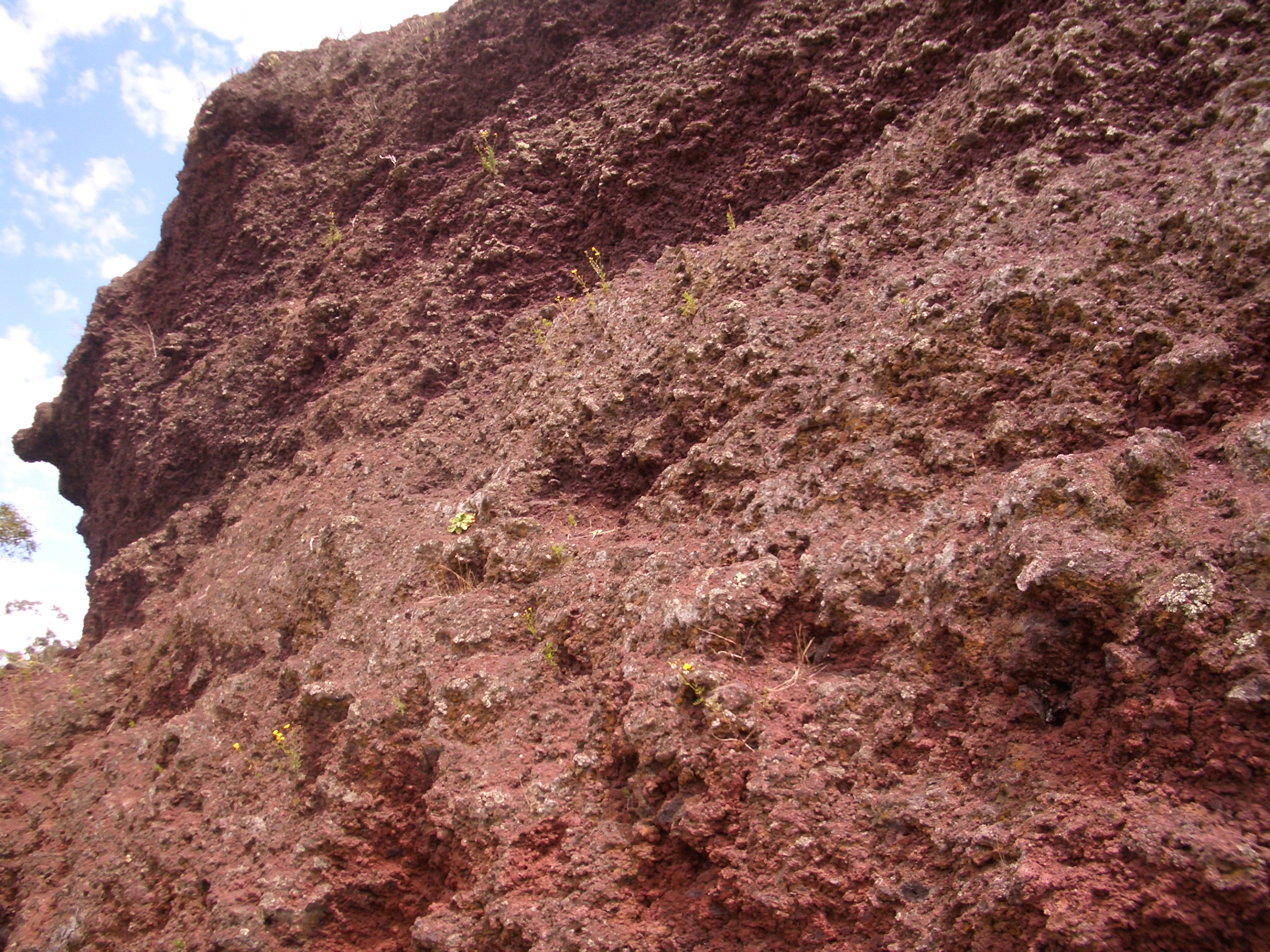
Scoria from Mount Napier

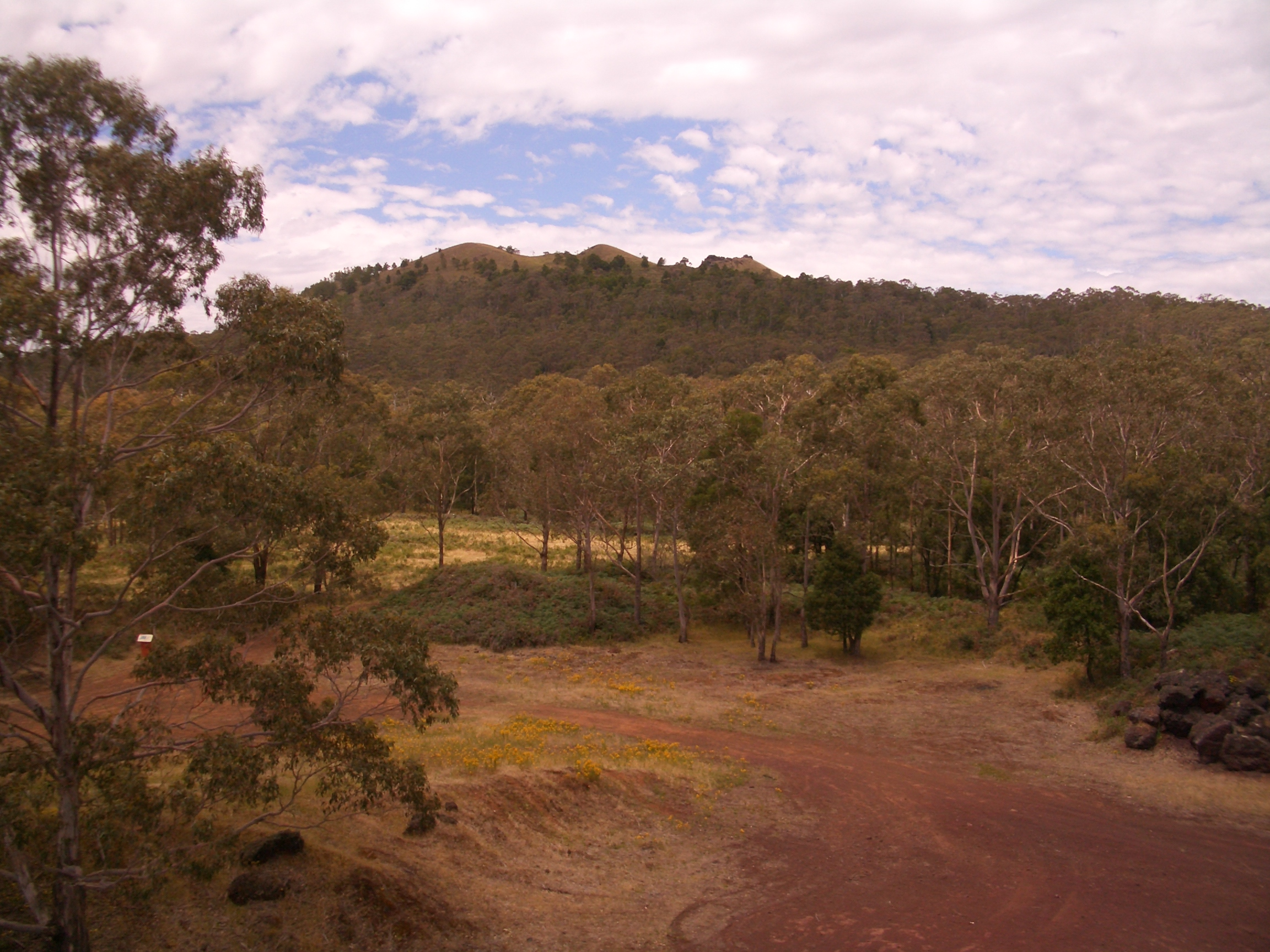
Close view of the volcanic rim

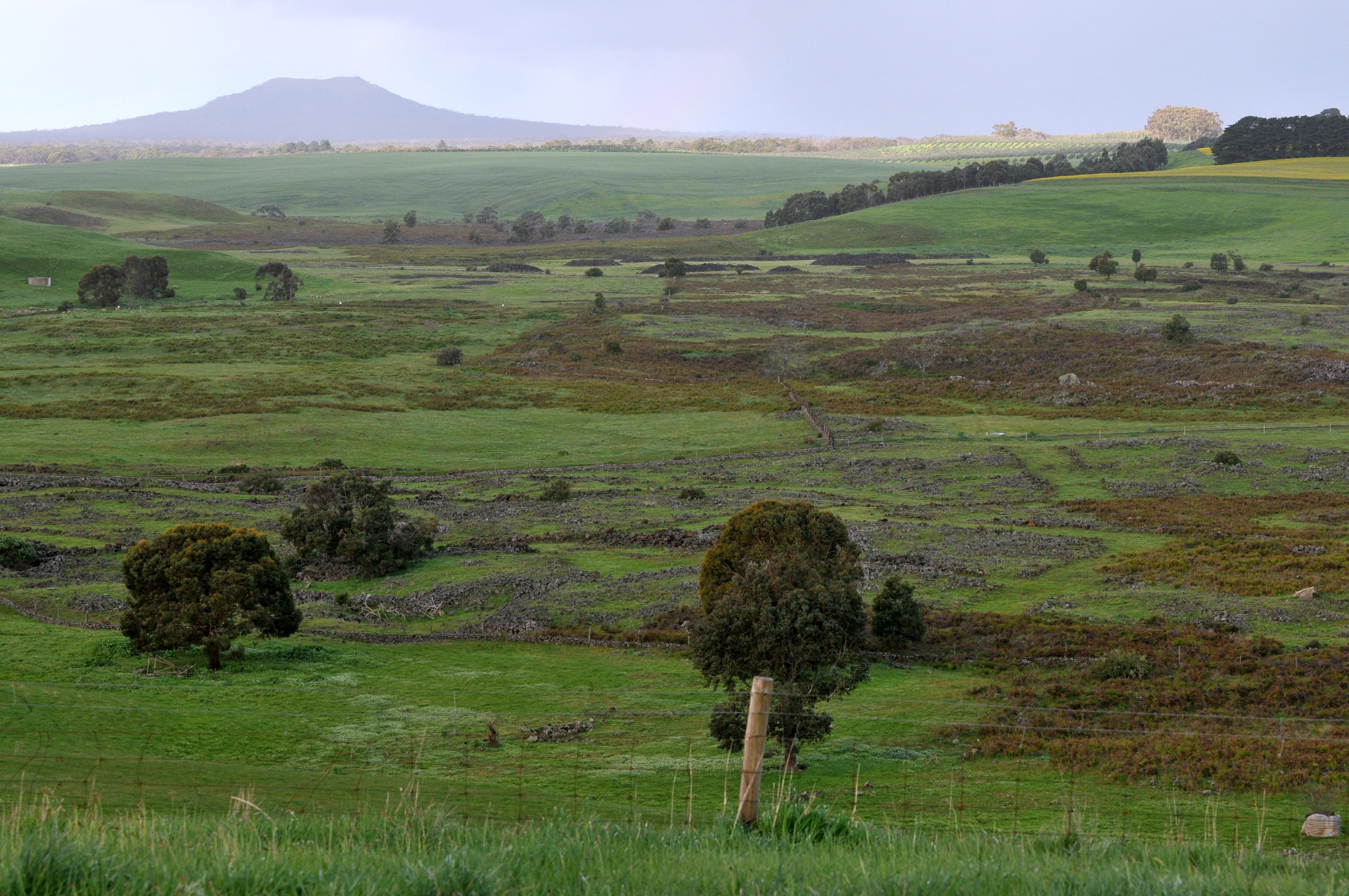
Harmans Valley to Mount Napier

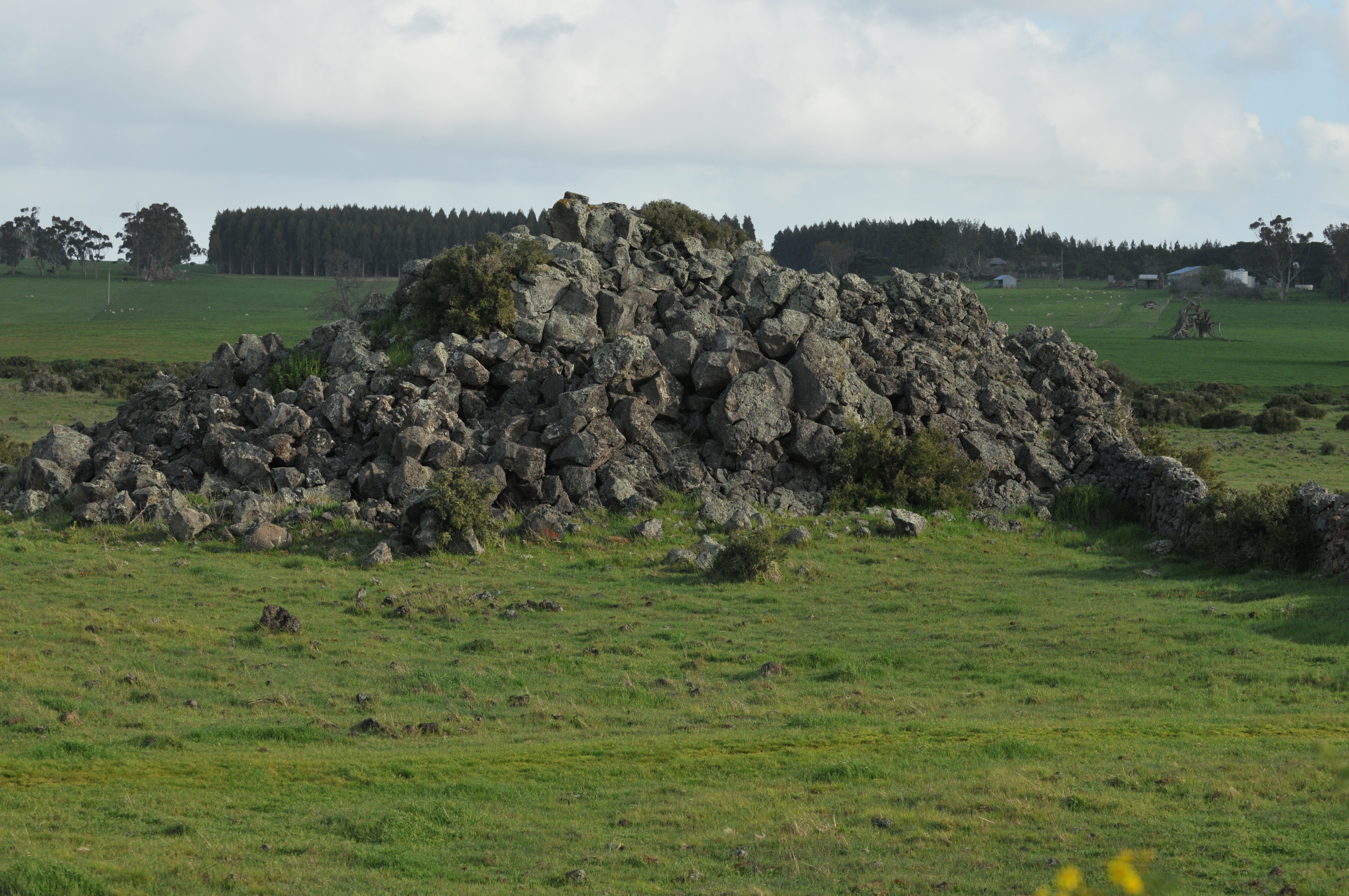
Tumuli - lava blisters

== See also ==
- List of mountains in Australia § Victoria
- List of volcanoes in Australia
