= House Mountain (Arizona) =

Landform in Yavapai County, Arizona

- Location within Arizona Location within the United States

Highest point
- Elevation: 5,131 ft (1,564 m) NAVD 88
- Prominence: 927 ft (283 m)
- Coordinates: 34°46′16″N 111°51′14″W

Geography
- Location: Yavapai County, Arizona, U.S.
- Topo map: USGS Sedona

Climbing
- Easiest route: Hike

House Mountain is a shield volcano located in the U.S. state of Arizona located between the Sedona Red Rock Country and the Verde Valley in the Coconino National Forest. House Mountain erupted approximately 13–15 million years ago on the edge of where the Mogollon Rim stood at that time. Thus, the basalt that was emitted preserved the sedimentary layers below it, including the Schnebly Hill Formation and the thin band of Fort Apache Limestone. The Mogollon Rim has receded at a rate of 1 foot per 600 years since and the current edge of the rim can be seen several miles away from the summit.

House Mountain is easily visible from State Route 89A as you drive from Sedona and Cottonwood. Turkey Creek Trail climbs for 3 miles up to the northern rim of the caldera. From there you can follow an old Jeep trail road down into the bowl of the caldera and up to the southern rim. Then, it is a steep, but short trek off trail to the summit. It was named House Mountain because of the rocky summit formation that superficially looks like a house from the Verde Valley below.
