= Mount Tor =

Mountain in West Coast Range, Tasmania

- Location within Tasmania

Highest point
- Elevation: 1,105 m (3,625 ft)
- Coordinates: 41°25′53″S 145°53′34″E

Geography
- Location: West Coast, Tasmania, Australia
- Parent range: West Coast Range

Geology
- Volcanic belt: Mount Read Volcanics
- Last eruption: 500 million years ago

Mount Tor is an extinct volcano located on the West Coast of Tasmania, Australia, with an elevation of 1,105 metres (3,625 ft) above sea level.

== Geology ==
Mount Tor was a shield volcano of the Mount Read Volcanics on Tasmania West Coast. The last eruption was 500 million years ago.
