= Sturgeon volcanic field =

Sturgeon volcanic fields

Geography
- Location: Queensland, Australia

Geology
- Mountain type: shield volcano
- Last eruption: Pleistocene era

The Sturgeon volcanic field is a lava field in Queensland, Australia. The volcanic fields are the remnants of a series of volcanic eruptions, the youngest of which is dated to the Pleistocene era. The fields cover an estimated 7500 square kilometers.
