= Mount Julia =

Mountain in West Coast Range, Tasmania

- Location within Tasmania

Highest point
- Elevation: 843 m (2,766 ft)
- Coordinates: 41°52′48″S 145°33′36″E

Geography
- Location: West Coast, Tasmania, Australia
- Parent range: West Coast Range

Geology
- Volcanic belt: Mount Read Volcanics
- Last eruption: 500 million years ago

Mount Julia is a mountain located in The West Coast Range, on the West Coast of Tasmania, Australia with an elevation of 843 metres (2,766 ft) above sea level.

== Geology ==
Mount Julia is part of the Mount Read Volcanics belt of Tasmania's West Coast.
