= Mount Cripps =

Mountain in West Coast Range, Tasmania

- Location within Tasmania

Highest point
- Elevation: 943 m (3,094 ft)
- Coordinates: 41°34′49″S 145°45′59″E

Geography
- Location: West Coast, Tasmania, Australia
- Parent range: West Coast Range

Geology
- Volcanic belt: Mount Read Volcanics
- Last eruption: 500 million years ago

Mount Cripps is an extinct volcano located on the West Coast of Tasmania, Australia.

With an elevation of 943 metres (3,094 ft) above sea level.

== Geology ==
Mount Cripps was a shield volcano of the Mount Read Volcanics on Tasmania West Coast. The last eruption was 500 million years ago.
