= Mount Elephant =

Mountain in Victoria, Australia

Mount Elephant (Djerrinallum)
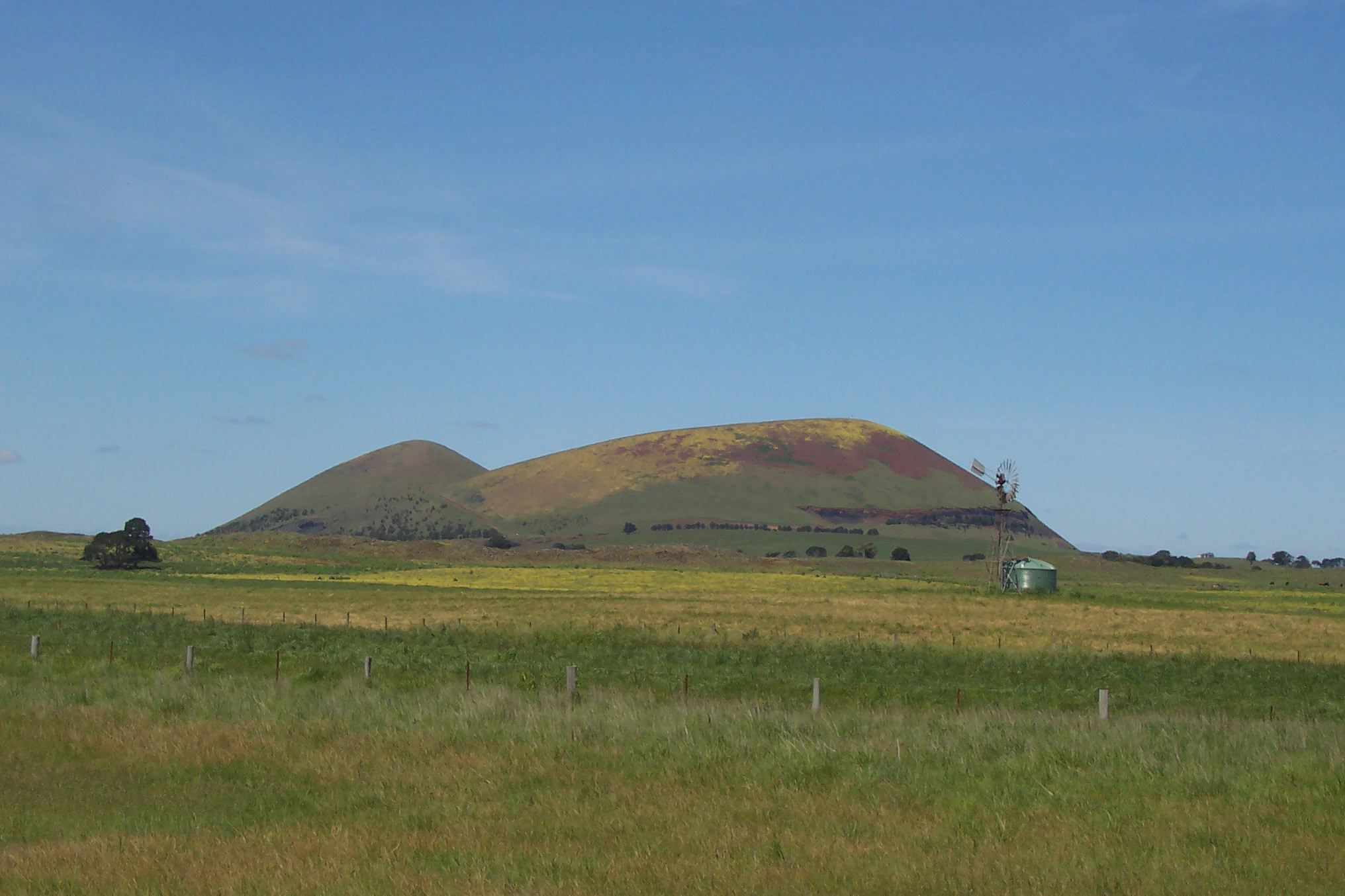
- Mount Elephant viewed from Derrinallum township

Highest point
- Elevation: 380 metres (1,250 ft) AHD
- Coordinates: 37°57′40″S 143°11′53″E

Geography
- Location within Victoria
- Location: South West region, Victoria, Australia

Geology
- Mountain type: conical breached scoria cone

Mount Elephant is a 380-metre-high (1,250 ft) conical breached scoria cone formed by a dormant volcano, located 1 km from the town of Derrinallum in southwestern Victoria, Australia. It is a prominent landmark that forms the eastern gateway to the Kanawinka Geopark from the Hamilton Highway at Derrinallum.

== Formation and history ==
Scoria cones are small volcanoes with relatively steep sides, usually formed as the result of a single major episode of volcanic activity. Lava lakes often form in the centre of scoria cones; if the lava in such a lake breaches the side of the cone, the result is a breached scoria cone, such as Mount Elephant. The volcano first erupted approximately 184,000 years ago, within a tolerance of 38,000 years, according to argon-argon dating research first published 21 February 2017. There are approximately 200 breached scoria cones in Victoria.

During early European settlement, the mountain was known as "Swagmans Lighthouse" or the "light house of the western district".

Mount Elephant was once quarried for its red/black scoria, and evidence of the quarry is visible at the base of its cone. The first of three quarries began on the north slope in 1910 and closed in 1913. The second quarry, known as the "old commercial pit" operated from the 1950s and closed in the 1990s. The last mining operations were undertaken by the Corangamite Shire and have now stopped. The scoria that was quarried from Mount Elephant was used to make many of the roads and buildings in and around the town of Derrinallum.

The mountain was privately owned until 2000, when it was purchased by the Trust for Nature and the local community. The aim is to revegetate the area and promote local tourism.

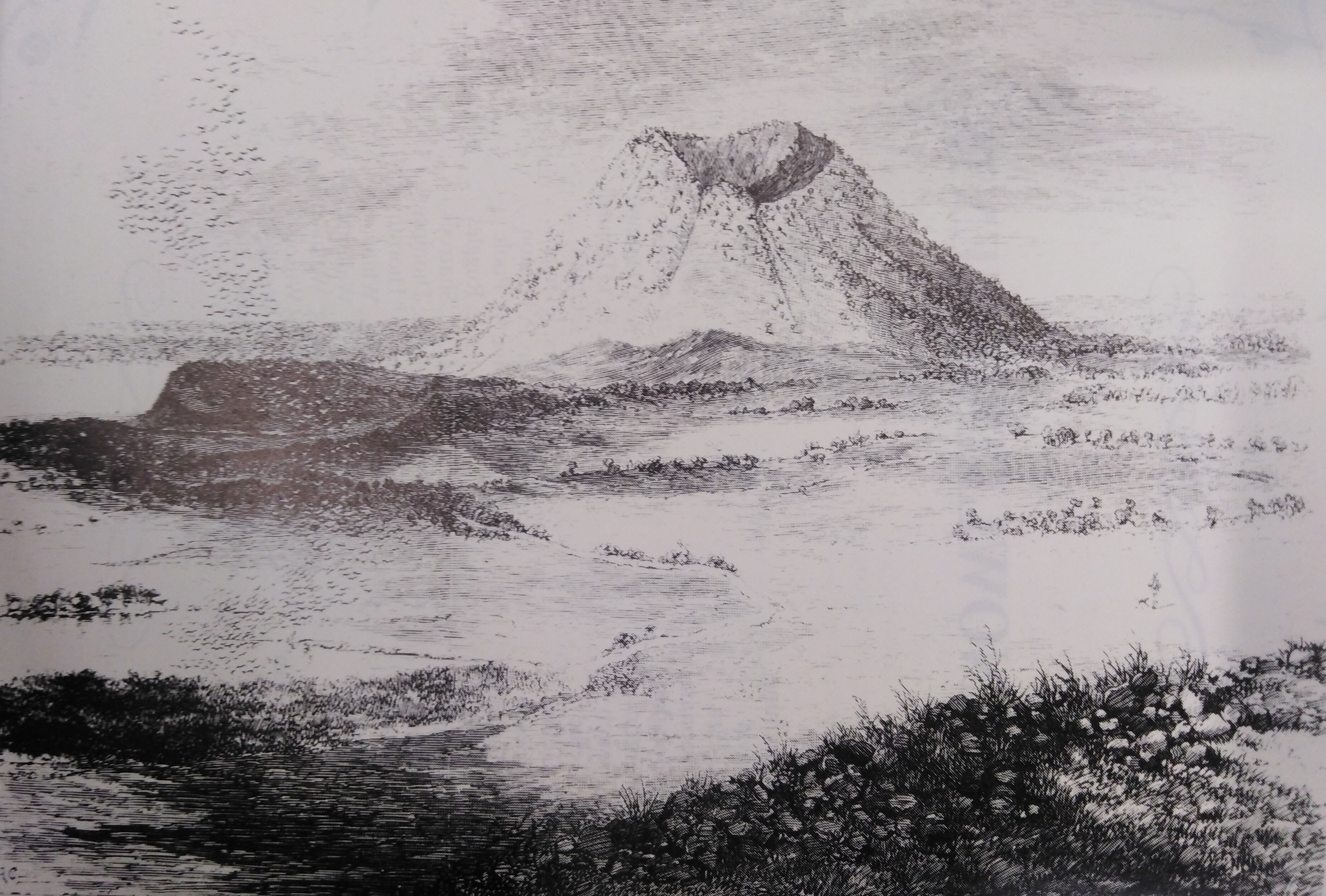
Mt. Elephant, Baucer, 1868, engraving of Mount Elephant

== Aboriginal history ==
Mount Elephant exists on the border of the Djargurd Wurrong and Wathawurrung (Wadawurrung) tribal boundaries, with the Gulidjan, and Girai wurrung tribes next closest. Mount Elephant may be part of the Teerinyillum Gudidg clan territory of the Djargurd Wurrung tribe or may be part of the land of an unknown Wadawurrung clan.

The Wathawurrung name for the mount, Djerrinallum, means "nest of sea swallows, terns" (Dawson, 1881). A slightly earlier source (Porteous, 1878) had stated the name to mean "a hill of fire... and is also the name of a local clan Djerrinallum gundidj". In the 2011 notes to the dreamtine story Derrinallum ba Buninyong however, Joel Wright says that the name Derrinallum means "home of sea swallows or terns frequenting neighbouring marshes", in the Girai wurrung (called by him "Keerray woorroong") language. According to James Dawson:

The Mount Shadwell tribe and its language are called 'Kirae wuurong,' 'blood lip.' with Kuurndit ["member of"] affixed for a member of the tribe. Its territory commences at the Hopkins Hill sheepwash on the Hopkins River, and extends to Mount Fyans, Mount Elephant, Cloven Hills, Minninguurt, Mount Noorat, Keilambete Lake, Framlingham aboriginal station, and up the east side of the Hopkins River to starting point.

Of the Aboriginal people we know about from the 1800s, the one most closely associated with Mount Elephant is known as "King Tom". He was painted by Robert Hawker Dowling (1827–1886) in 1856. The painting, entitled Aborigines in a Bark Hut: King Tom of the Mount Elephant Tribe, is in the collection of the National Library of Australia. The photographer Fred Kruger (1831–1888) took a photograph of Tom in 1877, possibly while he was at Coranderrk. The photograph is titled "King Tom - Derrinallum Tribe". Kruger's photograph was made into a lithographic print around 1880, included with "portraits of surviving leaders of Aboriginal tribes of Victoria, originally taken at various times between around 1866 and 1878" published under the title Album of the Kings & Queens of Victoria. Tom lived at Meningoort Station, about 25 km south-west of Mount Elephant, north of Camperdown and west of Lake Bookaar. Tom died at Meningort station was buried in Camperdown cemetery on 30 September 1881. Meningoort Station still exists in Corangamite Shire and has remained in the McArthur family since Scottish immigrant, Peter McArthur, squatted on the land in 1837.

=== Dreaming story ===
One early account of traditional Aboriginal beliefs surrounding the creation of Mt Elephant was provided by an unidentified person from the Wadawurrung tribe in 1846 and first published in London in 1861.

One of the legends that these tribes are fond of relating is, that Tyrinallum (Mt Elephant) and Bouninyoung [Mt Buninyong] (two volcanic hills about thirty miles apart) were formerly black men, that they quarreled and fought, the former being armed with a leeowil and the latter with a hand spear, and after a prolonged contest, Tyrrinallum thrust his spear in Bouninyoung's side, the cause of the present hollow in the side of the hill, which so infuriated him that he dealt the other a tremendous blow, burying the point of his leeowil in his head, which made the present large crater, and knocked him to the spot where he now stands.

This version of the story describes the Mount Elephant figure using a weapon called a "leeowil", which is described by Stanbridge in 1861 as a "wooden battle axe, the usual implement of hand to hand encounters".

== See also ==
- List of mountains in Australia § Victoria
- List of volcanoes in Australia
