= Mount Charter =

Mountain in West Coast Range, Tasmania

- Location within Tasmania

Highest point
- Elevation: 514 m (1,686 ft)
- Coordinates: 41°37′21″S 145°40′32″E

Geography
- Location: West Coast, Tasmania, Australia
- Parent range: West Coast Range

Geology
- Volcanic belt: Mount Read Volcanics
- Last eruption: 500 million years ago

Mount Charter is an extinct volcano located on the West Coast of Tasmania, Australia.

It has an elevation of 514 metres (1,686 ft) above sea level.

== Geology ==
Mount Charter was a major shield volcano of the Mount Read Volcanics on Tasmania's West Coast. The last eruption was 500 million years ago.

Zinc mineralization has been identified on the slopes of Mount Charter, however, to date mining has not occurred.
