= Mount Read Volcanics =

Cambrian volcanic belt in Western Tasmania

The Mount Read Volcanics is a Cambrian volcanic belt in Western Tasmania.

It is a complex belt due to folding, faulting and a range of tectonic events.

Between 1986 and 1993 a project to research and map the belt was conducted.

== Mapping ==
The component regions within the belt were identified in separate maps:

- Map 1. Geology of the Mt. Charter-Hellyer area
- Map 2. Geology of Rosebery - Mount Black area
- Map 3. Geology of the Henty River - Mount Read area
- Map 4. Geology of the Mount Murchison area
- Map 5. Geology of the Tyndall Range area
- Map 6. Geological compilation map of the Mount Read volcanics & associated rocks, Hellyer to south Darwin Peak Scale 1:100,000
- Map 7. Geology of the Back Peak - Cradle Mountain Link Road area
- Map 8. Geology of the Mt. Cattley - Mt. Tor area
- Map 9. Geology of the Winterbrook - Moina area
- Map 10. Geology of the Elliott Bay - Mt. Osmund area
- Map 11. Geology of the Wanderer River - Moores Valley area
- Map 12. Geology of the D'Aguilar Range area
- Map 13. Geology of the Mount Jukes - Mt. Darwin area.

== Conference excursions ==
Geological conferences in Australia and Tasmania have had symposiums and excursions to consider aspects of the phenomenon:

- 1986 - Geological Society of Australia, Tasmanian Division
- 1990 - Australian Geological Convention, Hobart
- 1993 - IAVCEI General Assembly, Canberra
- 2004 - Australian Geological Convention, Hobart

== Mining operations ==
It is a productive mineralised belt that has had profitable copper-silver and gold production of Mount Lyell, Rosebery, and Henty Gold Mine, as well as numerous smaller sites of prospective mineralisation along the West Coast Range.

== See also ==
- Geology of Tasmania
