= B. Wongar =

Serbian-Australian writer (1932–2026)

- Born: Sreten Božić; 1932; Gornja Trešnjevica, Kingdom of Yugoslavia
- Died: 8 March 2026 (aged 94); Melbourne, Australia
- Occupation: Writer

Sreten Božić (Serbian Cyrillic: Сретен Божић; 1932 – 8 March 2026), known by his pen name B. Wongar, was a Serbian Australian writer. For most of his literary career, his writings concerned the culture of Aboriginal Australians, and the disintegration of their traditional society owing to the effects of colonisation and the mining industry in the 1960s and 1970s. His 1978 short story collection, The Track to Bralgu, on which he collaborated with Australian writer Alan Marshall, was released to critical acclaim by the foreign press, who were led to believe by publisher Little Brown that Wongar was of Aboriginal ethnicity. The revelation that Wongar was a Serbian immigrant, as well as inconsistencies in his life story, subsequently led to controversy and allegations of literary hoax and cultural appropriation, particularly in Australia. However, his work was lauded abroad, including by Jean-Paul Sartre and Simone de Beauvoir, and several Australian literary critics have praised the quality of his writing.

He is known for five works which came to be known as the "Nuclear Cycle", as they reflected the effects of uranium mining as well as British nuclear testing in Australia. He is also known for Totem and ore: a photographic collection, and his autobiography Dingoes Den.

== Early life ==
Sreten Božić was born in 1932 and grew up in the village of Gornja Trešnjevica, near Aranđelovac, Serbia, then Kingdom of Yugoslavia. His birth name means "Merry Christmas" in English. He grew up during World War II, and life was hard for him and his family, and he did not receive much formal education; "a great deal was passed on through storytelling, oral history", he later said. He had two brothers, Milosav and Milenko. Božić said that his family was harassed by the Tito regime after the war, and his father died in prison. He left Serbia when he was 13, moving first to Italy in 1948.

He then moved to Paris, France, where he worked in a car factory. There, he met people involved in the socialist and Anti-Algerian War movements, including Jean-Paul Sartre and Simone de Beauvoir, who helped him to publish his literary works in their literary magazine Les Temps Modernes. While in Paris, he corresponded with the German writer Heinrich Böll, Irish writer Samuel Beckett, and South African writer Alan Paton, as well as Aboriginal leaders Sir Doug Nicholls and Yami Lester, and Australian Labor Party politician Gordon Bryant.

== Career ==
=== Writing ===
Božić arrived in Sydney, without papers and not knowing a word of English, in 1960. After meeting Alan Marshall in Melbourne, he decided to follow the author's advice and travel to central Australia to write about the Australian bush and Aboriginal people. He set out with his brothers Milosav and Milenko, working on mining sites at Coober Pedy in South Australia and Paraburdoo in Western Australia.

In his search for a job (as a construction worker or miner), he bought a camel in order to cross the Tanami Desert. He got lost on the way to Halls Gap after his camel got sick from eating salt bush, and was close to death when he was saved by an Aboriginal man called Juburu, who took him to Wyndham, in the Kimberley. He stayed there for around three months, getting to know the Aboriginal inhabitants. Moving around the desert areas, he tried to learn some of the local dialects, which he later used in his stories, with an attempt to use authentic words for the setting. Božić lived with Aboriginal people in the Northern Territory west of Darwin for around 10 years in the 1960s. The name Banumbir Wongar (usually spelt Barnumbirr), which means "morning star" and messenger from the spirit world, was said to be given to him by his wife Djumala and her relatives. He also later stated in an interview that "B." is in recognition of his Serbian name. The surname is derived from the Yolngu word Wangarr. His assumed name was also variously spelt Birimbir, Bahumir, and Banunbir. For most of his literary career, the concern of his writing was, almost exclusively, the condition of Aboriginal people in Australia.

In 1972, he collaborated with Australian writer Alan Marshall to publish a collection of stories titled Aboriginal Myths (described as non-fiction), based on stories passed on by people of the Delissaville Aboriginal community (now Belyuen) and Gove Peninsula. His informants included some prominent Aboriginal men, including "Prince of Wales" (the Larrakia artist, singer, and dancer Midpul (1935–2002)) and the Ngolokwangga elder Jim Muluk.

Also in collaboration with Marshall, he published The Sinners: Stories of Vietnam. After the publishing house had collapsed, he looked elsewhere for publishers, and his books were published in Europe, the UK, and the United States during the 1970s and 1980s. After moving to Melbourne in the 1970s, he began developing more of his stories for publication.

His collection of stories The Track to Bralgu, with a preface by South African author Alan Paton and a foreword by Marshall, was published in 1978 by American publisher Little, Brown and Company. The stories show the impact of white society on tribal Aboriginal people, in particular the negative effect of large-scale mining. During this time he also became involved in the Indigenous land rights movement. The book earned critical acclaim from the foreign press, who were led to believe by publisher Little Brown that Wongar was of Aboriginal ethnicity. It was translated into French as Le Chemin du Bralgu, from the original manuscript and published in Les Temps modernes on 15 April 1977.

The protagonist of his 1975 novel The Trackers is a south-east Asian man, who leaves his home in Melbourne to live with Aboriginal people in the Australian desert for a time. A Science Fiction Encyclopedia reviewer says that the novel "interestingly evokes Franz Kafka in its depiction of the surreal bureaucratization of the architect protagonist's discovery that he is gradually turning Black, and must escape white society".

Some of his stories were published in 1980 and 1981 in Australian publications, and included in a collection of his stories titled Barbaru, published in the United States in 1982 by the University of Illinois Press. The publication was supported by a National Endowment for the Arts and the state government agency Illinois Arts Council. In 1991, the Australian Book Review published a review of Barbaru, by Rosie Adams et al.

In April 1981, author Robert Drewe wrote a piece in The Bulletin that revealed B Wongar's real identity. After this, Wongar was criticised by some for having obtained government funding under false pretences, and some discredited his work as fake. Others, including academic Eve Fesl and Drewe, were more sympathetic; the latter wrote that he was "a kind of living novel". Paul Sharrad wrote in a 1982 article that, despite the problematic nature of a white man writing under an assumed identity, the stories in the collection "open to the world a window onto a little-known culture", and cast light on some important social issues.

His "Nuclear Trilogy", comprising the novels, Walg: A Novel of Australia, Karan, and Gabo Djara, were written in the 1980s. The trilogy was first published in Germany, translated from the original manuscript by Annemarie and Heinrich Böll. A library holding dated 1982 titled Walg, including a typed review by Simone de Beauvoir, a map of the Northern Territory, and a glossary, along with correspondence between Wongar and the Fryer Memorial Library at the University of Queensland, is in existence. The first edition in English was published by Dodd, Mead & Co. in New York in 1983, and is available on the Internet Archive, complete with the review by De Beauvoir. The novel is dedicated to Wongar's wife, Djumala, and includes a note saying that it is fiction, but that around 500 tribes and 600 languages existed before the colonisation of Australia, and only a few have survived. Comparing the German translation of Walg (Der Schoß) to its English version published by Braziller in 1990, Tess Caiter wrote in 2003 that the English edition had been censored. The novel was also translated into Spanish in 1983, and into Dutch in 1992. In his 1999 autobiography, Dingoes Den, Wongar wrote that the German translation remains the only complete text and unabridged version. The trilogy depicts "Eugenics-based experiments" carried out on an Aboriginal woman by a corporation involved in uranium mining and nuclear testing. Gabo Djara was dedicated to his later life partner, Prue Grieve, who also edited some of his work.

After police had raided Wongar's home and taken some of his work, including the sole copy of the manuscript of his new novel Raki, the Australian author Thomas Shapcott spoke about the case at the opening of the Adelaide Festival in March 1990. He circulated a petition asking the state authorities to see that the confiscated manuscript be returned to Wongar. About 200 writers at the festival signed the petition. It took Wongar about five years to write Raki again. The novel is the only one in which there is any reference to Serbia, and is told by a first-person narrator who begins telling stories of Serbian folklore that become intertwined with Aboriginal stories. This was followed by his new book Didjeridu Charmer, which completes his nuclear series, thus making the series a quintet.

Australian publishers Angus & Robertson started republishing his earlier work in the 1990s. In 1991, Wongar's short novel Marngit (an Aboriginal word for "magic man", or "healer") was published by Collins / Angus & Robertson in Australia, described by the publishers as an "anthology of engaging tales focusing on the creatures of the Aboriginal bush, as well as legendary figures from Aboriginal lore". This was the first time a book-length work by him had been published in Australia before being published elsewhere - and also published an Australian edition of The Track to Bralgu. In a 1992 interview, he said that he writes fiction, not history, and considered himself an artist, and that he felt a deep compassion and respect for Aboriginal people, and admired their culture.

One of his articles was published in Smoke Signals, the magazine of the Aborigines Advancement League.

=== Photographs ===
While he was in the northern part of Australia, Wongar worked on his Totem and Ore photographic collection, also known under the title Boomerang and Atom. The collection contained several thousand black-and-white photographs portraying the impact of uranium mining and the British nuclear testing on tribal Aboriginal people. In 1974, Wongar was asked to send some of the Totem and Ore photographs for an exhibition in the Parliament House Library in Canberra. The exhibition was shut down two days after the official opening.

== Reception ==
Therese-Marie Meyer wrote in her 2006 work Where Fiction Ends: Four Scandals of Literary Identity Construction that Wongar's books were the most widely known literary representation of Australian Aboriginal culture.

Wongar's work was admired by Jean-Paul Sartre and Simone de Beauvoir. He has been widely praised in Europe and his books have been translated into several languages. However, his early works were little known in Australia, he remains little known in his home country of Serbia. Canberra Times reviewer Hamilton Smith wrote in 1992: It is ironic that Wongar has attracted his greatest recognition outside Australia. Apart from the political and social overtones implicit in his works, he is foremost a gifted writer. A writer who happens to possess a special understanding of the circumstances of black Australians".

The revelation that Wongar was a Serbian immigrant, as well as inconsistencies in his life story, led to controversy and allegations of literary hoax and cultural appropriation. Criticisms of Wongar range from being a white man who usurped Aboriginal culture, to the claim saying that all artists are charlatans, who con the public. Australian novelist and playwright Thomas Keneally wrote in 2003 that the American publishers of The Track to Bralgu, Little Brown, had stated that he was Aboriginal, and reviewers had assessed the book "as written by a person who we now discovered did not exist". Keneally had called the stories "brilliant... an extraordinary new book", but owing to the confused identity: "Time might prove him to be a highly significant Australian writer, but his deception has soured his reception in the English-speaking world". Much of this centres around his identity, which was speculated upon incorrectly at times; the "deception" referred to by Keneally. Wongar spoke about these criticisms in an interview published in 2010, saying that he had become part of an Aboriginal family (after marrying an Aboriginal woman), a member of the tribe, and felt the responsibility towards his extended family. He said that he wrote about the plight of the Aboriginal people, who had been poorly treated since colonisation, and also wrote from the oral history that he had been privileged to hear from his group. He said that much of what he wrote was sad and depressing, and many people did not want to read about the disintegration of Aboriginal society.

== Personal life and death ==
Wongar married an Aboriginal woman called Djumala in a tribal ceremony in the 1960s, and they had two children. He lived in the Northern Territory for around ten years, broken by a few trips to Melbourne to collaborate with Alan Marshall, with whom he had Aboriginal Myths published in 1972. He decided to move to Melbourne permanently because his family group had to keep moving to escape the authorities, the Aboriginal land was being taken over by mining interests, and "it wasn't good for me to be white in the area, to be on a reservation". He had intended that they follow him to Melbourne when he moved there around 1970, but he did not see them again. Reports of Djumala's death vary; Wongar said in an interview published in 2010 that he had been told by the local Aboriginal people that she and the children had drunk water from a poisoned well.

Wongar is reported to have travelled back to Serbia to see his father for the last time in 1966, on an Australian passport.

As of 2006 he was dividing his time between suburban Melbourne and a rural property called "Dingoes Den" in Noojee, Gippsland, where he kept several dingoes. In an interview published in 2010, he said that he had three dingoes, which he believed were reincarnated members of his family.

In 2008, filmmaker Andrijana Stojković, who is an assistant professor of documentary directing at the Faculty of Dramatic Arts, University of Arts in Belgrade, Serbia, spent four weeks interviewing and filming Wongar. This resulted in the 60-minute documentary feature Wongar, which was eventually released in 2018, screening at several film festivals as well as having a cinema release. The director focuses mostly on his straitened circumstances, living on his dilapidated property, then caring for six dingoes. He had collected and kept many old newspapers, books, publications, and art relating to Australia in the 20th century. The film was shot over four weeks, which included one week of shooting in the Northern Territory, where the filmmakers spoke to Aboriginal elders in Oenpelli (Gunbalanya). There, one old man recognising the author upon being shown a photograph.

He was a life member of the Australian Atomic Ex-Servicemen's Association, after its formation in 1985 (later Australian Ex-Services Atomic Survivors Association).

Wongar died on 8 March 2026, at the age of 94.

== Awards and honours ==
- 1980: Arvon Foundation Poetry Award, UK
- 1982: American Library Association Award
- 1986: PEN International Award (US), for Nuclear Cycle
- 1986–87: Writer-in-residence at the Aboriginal Research Centre at Monash University, a community residency funded by a grant by the Literature Board of the Australia Council
- 1997: Australia Council Writers' Emeritus Award
- 2009: Honorary doctorate in the Faculty of Philology and Arts at the University of Kragujevac in Serbia

== Selected publications ==
=== Original works ===
- The Trackers: a novel Outback Press, Collingwood, 1975
- The Last Pack of Dingoes, Angus & Robertson (Australia), 1993 ISBN 9780207171475
- Nuclear Cycle/Quintet
  - Walg: A Novel of Australia (1983), Dodds Mead, 1983
  - Karan, Dodds Mead 1985, ISBN 9780396087229
  - Gabo Djara: A Novel of Australia, WW Norton, 1991, ISBN 9780807612439
  - Raki: a novel, London: Marion Boyars, 1997 ISBN 978-0-7145-3031-4
  - Manhunt, B. Wongar 2008, ISBN 9780977507832
  - Diddjeridu Charmer, Dingo Books, 2015 ISBN 9780977507849
- Dingoes den, Imprint, 1999, ISBN 978-1-875892-58-7
- Totem and ore: a photographic collection (2006), Dingo Books, Carnegie, Victoria 2006 ISBN 9780977507801

=== Translation ===
- The New Guinea Diaries (1997) – English translation from the Russian book by Nicholas Miklouho-Maclay, Dingo Books, Victoria, Australia ISBN 978-0-9775078-1-8

== Appearances on television and film ==
- A Double Life. The Life and Times of B.Wongar (1994). 56-minute video written and directed by John Mandelberg
- "Dingoes, Names and B. Wongar" – interview with Jan Wositzky, for ABC Radio National's Books and Writing program (2001)
- Wongar (2018), a 60-minute observational documentary on his life directed by Andrijana Stojković, which won first prize at the prestigious Belgrade Documentary and Short Film Festival and was screened at Dokufest in 2019 and streamed at the Melbourne Documentary Film Festival in 2020
