= Bora Kuzmanović =

Serbian professor, politician (born 1944)

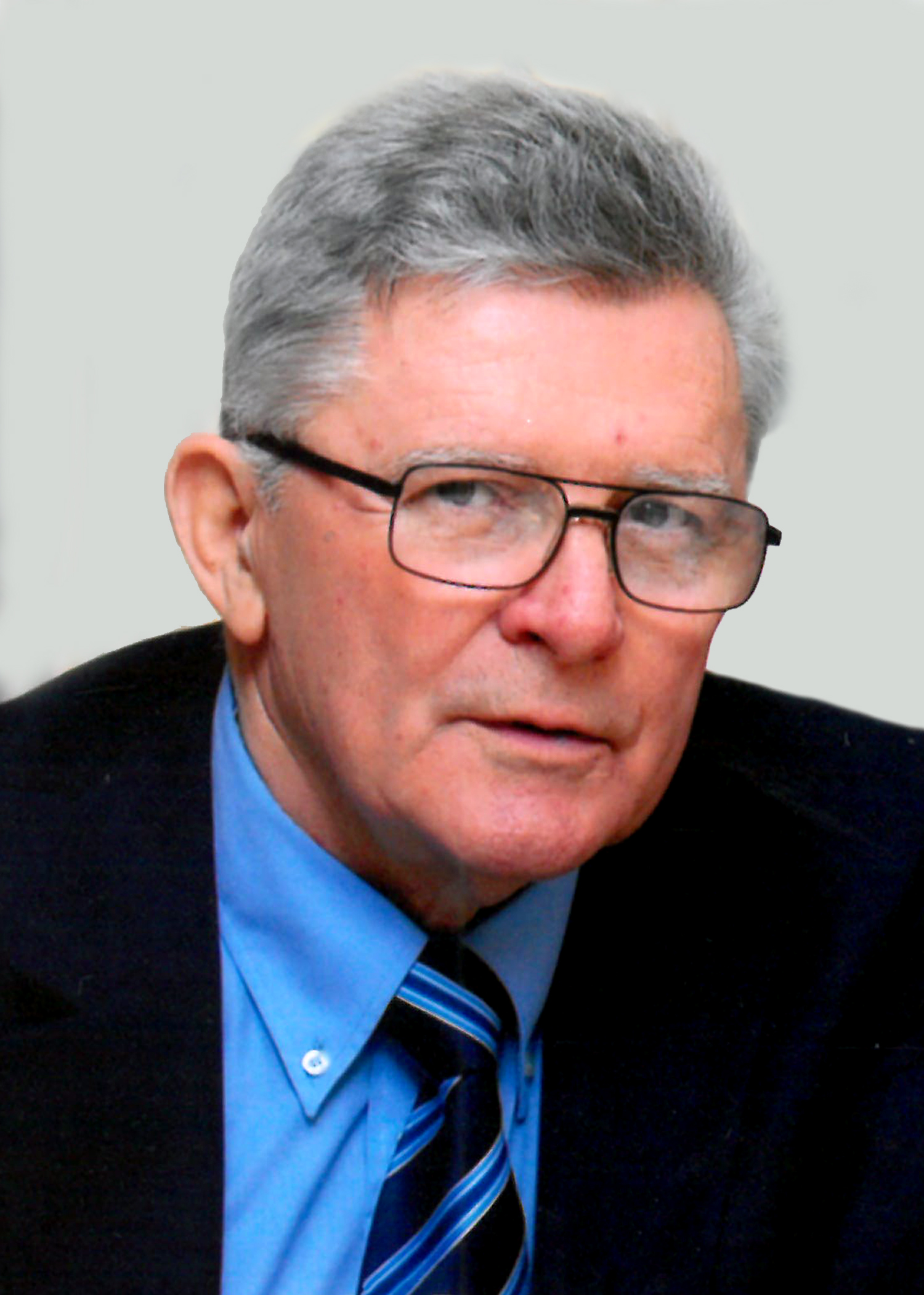

Bora Kuzmanović is a professor of Social Psychology at Belgrade University. He was also a member of Serbian Parliament twice, as well as a member of Parliament of The Federal Republic of Yugoslavia and later the Parliament of Serbia and Montenegro for social-democratic parties. During the war in former Yugoslavia, Kuzmanović was an opponent of Slobodan Milosevic. In 1993 he was a spokesman for the leading opposition party in Serbia, The Democratic Party.

== Biography ==
Kuzmanović was born in 1944 in Gornja Tresnjevica near Arandjelovac in Serbia (near the capital Belgrade). He graduated from University of Belgrade in 1967. As a postgraduate student and assistant, he participated in the events of June 1968 in Belgrade. Later, Kuzmanović continued his opposition activities and was expelled from the Communist Party in 1973 on charges of violating "democratic centralism". He supported opposition forces at the Faculty of Philosophy (the University of Belgrade). Kuzmanović completed postgraduate studies in 1973 and obtained his PhD in 1987. As a University professor, he taught Social Psychology and other courses at The Department of Psychology until he retired in 2011. Kuzmanovic was the director of The Institute of Psychology (1990-2011), President of The Serbian Psychology Society (1983-1985), President of Yugoslav Psychological Organizations (1987-1989), President of The Managing Board of The Center of Applied Psychology and President of The Managing Board of Social Sciences Institute.

Kuzmanović was the president of The Scientific Council of The Institute of Psychology, a member of The National Education Council of The Republic of Serbia, and Editor-in-Chief of the journal "Psychological Research". He is the co-author of "Deca bez roditeljskog staranja" (Children Without Parental Care); Project Manager, Editor and Co-author, Institut za psihologiju and Save the Children, Beograd, 2002.
