= Chapel of All Saints, Geelong Grammar School =

Chapel attached to Geelong Grammar School

- All Saints' Church of England Chapel, Geelong Grammar School
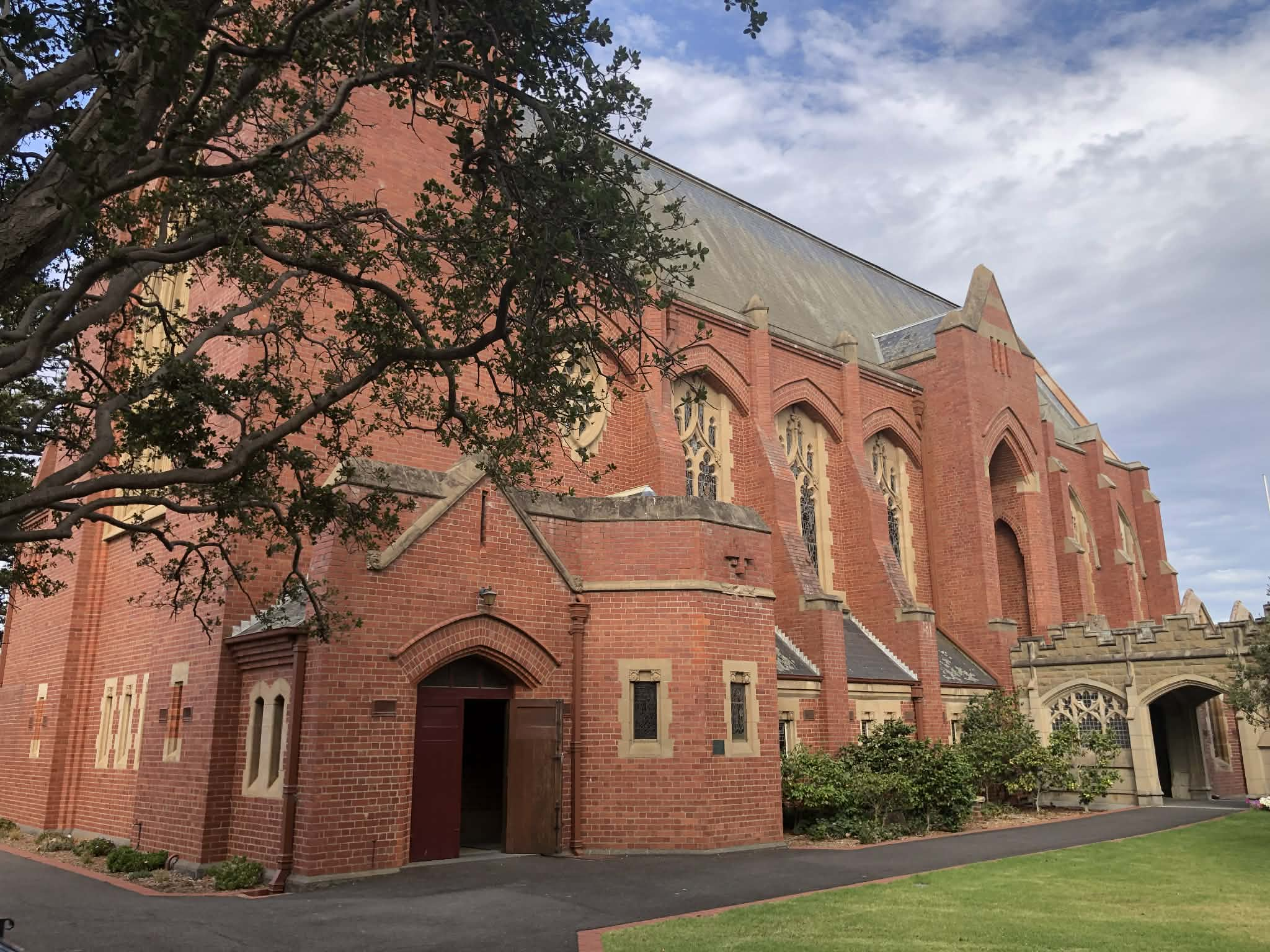
- Chapel of All Saints, February 2026
- Chapel of All Saints, Geelong Grammar School
- 38°04′11″S 144°23′57″E
- Location: Geelong Grammar School, Corio, Victoria
- Country: Australia
- Denomination: Anglican Church of Australia

History
- Status: Active

Architecture
- Architect: Philip Hudson
- Style: Gothic Revival
- Completed: 1914 (part), 1929

Administration
- Province: Victoria
- Diocese: Melbourne

The Chapel of All Saints (also styled as All Saints' Chapel) is an Anglican chapel located on Geelong Grammar School's main campus in Corio, Victoria, Australia. It serves as the principal place of worship and spiritual centre for the school's students and community. The chapel was constructed in stages in 1914 and 1929 respectively, and features historically significant interior elements, including a notable pipe organ and a series of heritage-listed memorial stained glass windows commemorating former students who served and died in both World War I and World War II.

== History ==
The foundation stone of the Chapel of All Saints was laid on Friday 3rd April 1914 by Mrs F. S. Falkiner from Boonoke Homestead, near Conargo, New South Wales. Visitors from Geelong and Melbourne arrived by train and motor for the subsequent ceremony at 3:00 pm that afternoon. Upon its foundation until its consecration, the chapel was also known as the "Falkiner Chapel", and Falkiner family members, including Franc B. S. Falkiner, Otway R. Falkiner, Norman F. Falkiner, Raph S. Falkiner and Leigh S. Falkiner all donated £1000 each for its construction.

On 1 November 1915, the church was consecrated, being dedicated to all the saints, coinciding with All Saints Day.

On Friday 1 November 1929, the nave was finished, resulting in the completion of the chapel. Leigh and Franc Falkiner flew from New South Wales to attend the ceremony.

=== Pipe organ ===
A notable feature of the Chapel of All Saints is its pipe organ, which has a complex history spanning several decades. The core instrument was originally built in 1909 by Hill & Son of London for the residence Dalvui (Noorat, Victoria) owned by Niel Walter Black, a former student of Geelong Grammar School and son of prominent pastoralist Niel Black. The organ case was designed by architect Henry Hardie Kemp. After Black's death aboard the SS Waratah, his brothers donated the organ to the school. It was installed in the newly built chapel in 1915 by George Fincham & Son, with an opening recital held on All Saints' Day that year.

As the chapel structure expanded with the extension of the nave in 1929, the organ was moved and the organ chamber altered to suit the new spatial configuration. In the 1930s, the instrument's limitations in tonal power became clear, and it was eventually enlarged and rebuilt in 1958 by J. W. Walker & Sons of Ruislip, Middlesex, resulting in a three-manual instrument with an expanded specification more appropriate for the building's acoustical needs. The organ has since received further maintenance and mechanical upgrades.

=== Stained glass windows ===
The interior of the Chapel of All Saints is distinguished by a series of stained glass windows commemorating former students who served and died in the First World War and Second War War. A series of windows designed by artist William Montgomery were made for the first stage of the chapel, with further windows not being installed until the extension was completed. In the mid-1940s, Australians artist Mervyn Waller and his then-wife Christian Waller additionally created windows.

The following list contains the names of some of the Old Geelong Grammarians who have a heritage-listed stained glass window dedicated to them in their memory. Names appearing together appear on the same window:

- Henry Percival Douglass, George Percival Douglass
- Thomas Maxwell Fisk
- Stewart Irvine Weir
- George Lindon
- Charles Cuthbertson Learmonth
- John Noel Learmonth
- William J. H. Gove
- J. R. Wright
- Edward Charles Sherwood Seller
- Roderick Russell Herbert Bowes
- Herbert John Cameron Hammond
- Nigel Russell Pugh
- Robert Barclay Anderson
- William Eric Lloyd
- Stephen John Leach
- Robert O'Halloran Giles
- Richard Halliday Kiddle
- Charles C. Kelly
- John Bell, George Russell Bell
- Leigh Brereton Sadleir Falkiner, John Alexander Falkiner
- Henry Dundas Keith Macartney
- John Brown Broughton Botterill, Charles Russell Botterill
- Kenneth Charles Webb-Ware
- George Pollard Kay
- Jack Russell, Robert Ritchie Russell
- Noel Beresford Foster Rutledge
- John Webster
- Bertie Manifold
- Kenneth McGeorge Ronald
- Vivian Franklin Rose Price

== See also ==
- Dalvui
