= Totem and Ore =

- Cover of Totem and Ore
- Author: B. Wongar
- Publisher: Carnegie, Vic. : Dingo Books
- Publication date: 2006
- ISBN: 0-9775078-0-7
- OCLC: 83977621
- Dewey Decimal: 305.89915 22
- LC Class: U264 .W66 2006

Totem and Ore is a small part of a collection of 5,000 photographs taken by Serbian-born writer and photographer B. Wongar in the 1960s and early 1970s in northern and central Australia. The Totem and Ore collection is about the negative effects of the British nuclear testing on Aboriginal Australians living in that area of South Australia during the late 1950s and early 1960s, as well as their displacement by the mining of uranium.

In 2019, John Mandelberg released a documentary film inspired by the photographic collection, called Totem & Ore.

== Background ==
Mining of uranium took place in northern Australia in the 1960s.

Subsequently, British nuclear testing took place at Maralinga, in the northern desert area of South Australia in the 1960s and early 1970s in northern and central Australia Both the uranium mining and nuclear testing destroyed many Aboriginal people's natural habitat, and decimated their population in northern and central Australia. To deflect any criticism of the testing, the Australian Government enacted the Australian Atomic Energy Act 1953, forbidding publishing any kind of information about it. The penalty for violating the Act was imprisonment up to 20 years. B. Wongar took around 5,000 photographs relating to the mining of uranium and the subsequent British nuclear testing, showing how these events affected Aboriginal Australians who lived in the area.

The photo exhibition under this title was first mounted at the Adult Education Centre in Melbourne, where it was opened by Gordon Bryant, Minister for Aboriginal Affairs. At the invitation of Derek Freeman, head of the anthropology department at the Australian National University in Canberra, Wongar visited that university with his exhibition on the occasion of the celebration of National Aboriginal Day. There he met his old friend, Yami Lester, an Aboriginal man from Alice Springs, who lost his eyesight at the age of 12 after watching the bomb "Emu 1" explode on 15 October 1953. Lester gave a speech, the first of its kind in public, about the nuclear tests, "told as one of the victims saw them".

During debate in Australian Parliament on the second report of the Aboriginal Land Rights Commission, an exhibition of this photographic collection, named Boomerang and Atom, at the Parliamentary Library of Australia in Canberra, was opened in September 1974. Two days after opening, the exhibition was closed. The photographs were taken down "at the behest of the library's then deputy director Michael Thwaites, a former ASIO official..."on the grounds that they were "sub-standard." Thwaites said that the photographs were undated, uncaptioned, without explanation, and bore no relation to the stated theme of the effect of mining on Aboriginal people. Wongar responded: "A lot of trouble began for me after I mounted an exhibition of photographs which I took in the bush showing the condition of the Aborigines displaced by uranium mining and British nuclear testing. The pictures show how the Aborigines suffered from nuclear testing and from the mining which disturbed the tribal life. When the first Land Rights Bill came up, it was to be debated in Parliament in Canberra. An officer from the library had seen my collection of photographs at the Australian National University and wrote asking if he could have the collection on loan for Parliamentarians to see the impact of the industrial development on tribal life. I mounted the exhibit thinking naively that the Parliamentarians could learn something. Of course, they knew everything they wanted to know. The same day the exhibition was mounted, it was ordered taken down. The man who was the chief librarian in the Parliament Library attacked me in the press, saying that my pictures distorted the facts".

For decades the collection was not published in Australia and the United Kingdom for being politically unacceptable. A part of confronting photographs of this collection was originally published in Germany in the 1980sunder the titles Bumerang und Bodenscharze and Bumerang und Atom and, in 2006, published as a book by Dingo Books in Australia.

A much larger photographic collection, taken first in the mid-1960s when Wongar visited numerous localities, including Ernabella (SA), Alice Springs, Barrow Creek, Mataranka, Darwin and Gove (all in the NT), and Gunnedah in New South Wales, then complemented by those he shot in the communities of Papunya, Maryvale (Titjikala), and Oenpelli (Gunbalanya) in 1977, is now stored in the Museums Victoria as "B. Wongar Collection". According to Jason Gibson of Museums Victoria: "Often shot in an opportunistic fashion, Wongar's photos reveal the everyday lives of the Aboriginal people on cattle stations, missions and government settlements during a time of considerable social and political change". A smaller part of the collection is Totem and Ore.

== Film ==
In 2019, Waikato Institute of Technology academic and filmmaker John Mandelberg released a documentary film, Totem & Ore, inspired by Wongar's book. Mandelberg said:

I was fascinated by his story. He was from Eastern Europe and wrote fiction like an Aboriginal about the clash between white people and Aborigines. His first three novels became known as The Nuclear Trilogy and they told a grim story about the testing that took place in the 1950s. He showed that uranium dislocated communities where testing took place.

He wanted to make an anti-nuclear documentary, "... a film about the past, the present and the future... a human story, about the frailty of human lives, human experiences and human tragedy..."

In 2006 he made a promotional trailer named "Totem & Ore", but at that time there was no funds to support this topic. In late 2015 the funds became available to make the Totem & Ore documentary, thanks to Wongar. The film is based on Wongar's book and also includes experiences of survivors of the atomic bombings of Hiroshima and Nagasaki and the Fukushima nuclear accident.

Filming started in April 2016 in Hiroshima, with Ursula Yovich as Hiroshima visitor and the film narrator. All atomic bomb survivors and anti-nuclear activists and some affected by the fallout from Fukushima meltdown were met and interviewed thanks to Tomoko Ichitani, professor at the Department of Foreign Language Studies at Seinan Gakuin University. She acted as translator, and created English subtitles.

The Maralinga test site was not filmed; instead, extant material by photographer and filmmaker Jessie Boylan was used. Interviews of members of the Yalata community were omitted due to failed negotiations. Instead, interviews with Aboriginal community members were included.

The documentary contains interviews with Helen Caldicott as well as Jim Green of Friends of the Earth Australia. Caldicott spoke about the effects of the nuclear testing, and Green gave commentary on atomic testing, the McClelland Royal Commission, uranium mining in Australia, and proposed nuclear waste dumps.

In an interview with Wongar filmed at his home in Melbourne, he talked about his Nuclear Cycle books, in particular about writing the last book in the series, Didjeridu Charmer.

Mandelberg's documentary had its world premiere at the Hiroshima International Film Festival on 24 November 2019 and became part of the Hiroshima Peace Memorial Museum collection.
