= Alan Marshall (Australian writer) =

Australian writer (1902-1984)

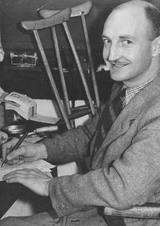
- Born: William Alan Marshall; 2 May 1902; Noorat, Victoria, Australia
- Died: 21 January 1984 (aged 81); Melbourne (Brighton East)
- Occupation: writer
- Spouse: Olive Dixon
- Children: 2 daughters
- Writing career
- Language: English
- Notable work: I Can Jump Puddles (1955)

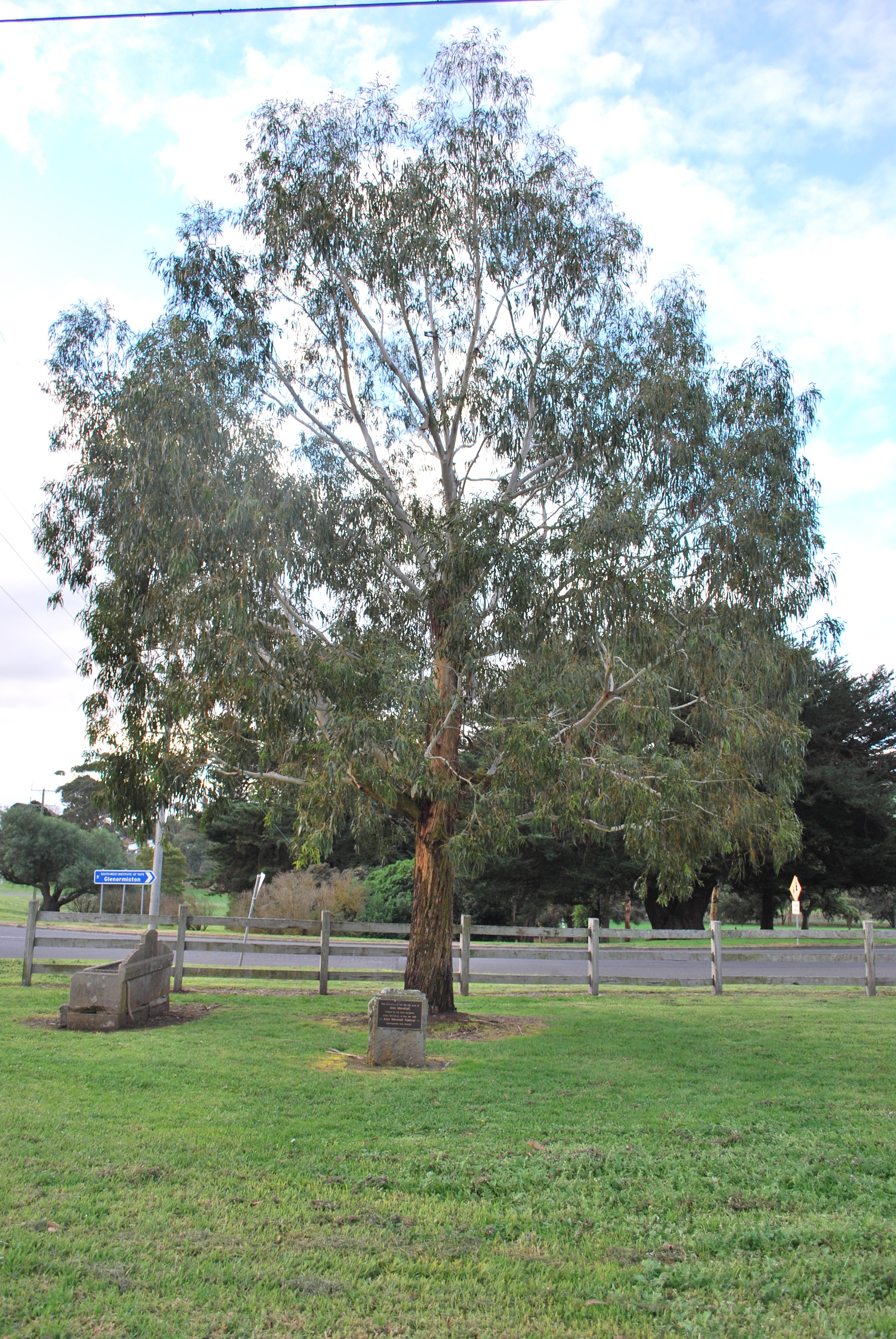
A tree dedicated to the memory of Marshall in his childhood home town of Noorat.

William Alan Marshall AM, (2 May 1902 – 21 January 1984) was an Australian writer, story teller, humanist and social documenter.

He received the Australian Literature Society Short Story Award three times, the first in 1933. His best known book, I Can Jump Puddles (1955) is the first of a three-part autobiography. The other two volumes are This is the Grass (1962) and In Mine Own Heart (1963).

== Early life and education ==
William Alan Marshall was born in Noorat, Victoria on 2 May 1902. At six years old he contracted polio, which left him with a physical disability that grew worse as he grew older.

He attended Terang Higher Elementary School for two years, before leaving to work with his father.

== Career ==
From an early age, Marshall resolved to be a writer and, in I Can Jump Puddles, he demonstrated an almost total recall of his childhood in Noorat. The characters and places of his book are thinly disguised from real life: "Mount Turalla" is Mount Noorat, "Lake Turalla" is Lake Keilambete, the "Curruthers" are the Blacks, "Mrs. Conlon" is Mary Conlon of Dixie, Terang, and his best friend, "Joe", is Leo Carmody.

During the early 1930s. Marshall worked as an accountant at the Trueform Boot and Shoe Company, Clifton Hill, and later wrote about life in the factory in his novel How Beautiful are Thy Feet (1949).

In 1937, he completed his first novel, How Beautiful Are Thy Feet, which remained unpublished until 1949.

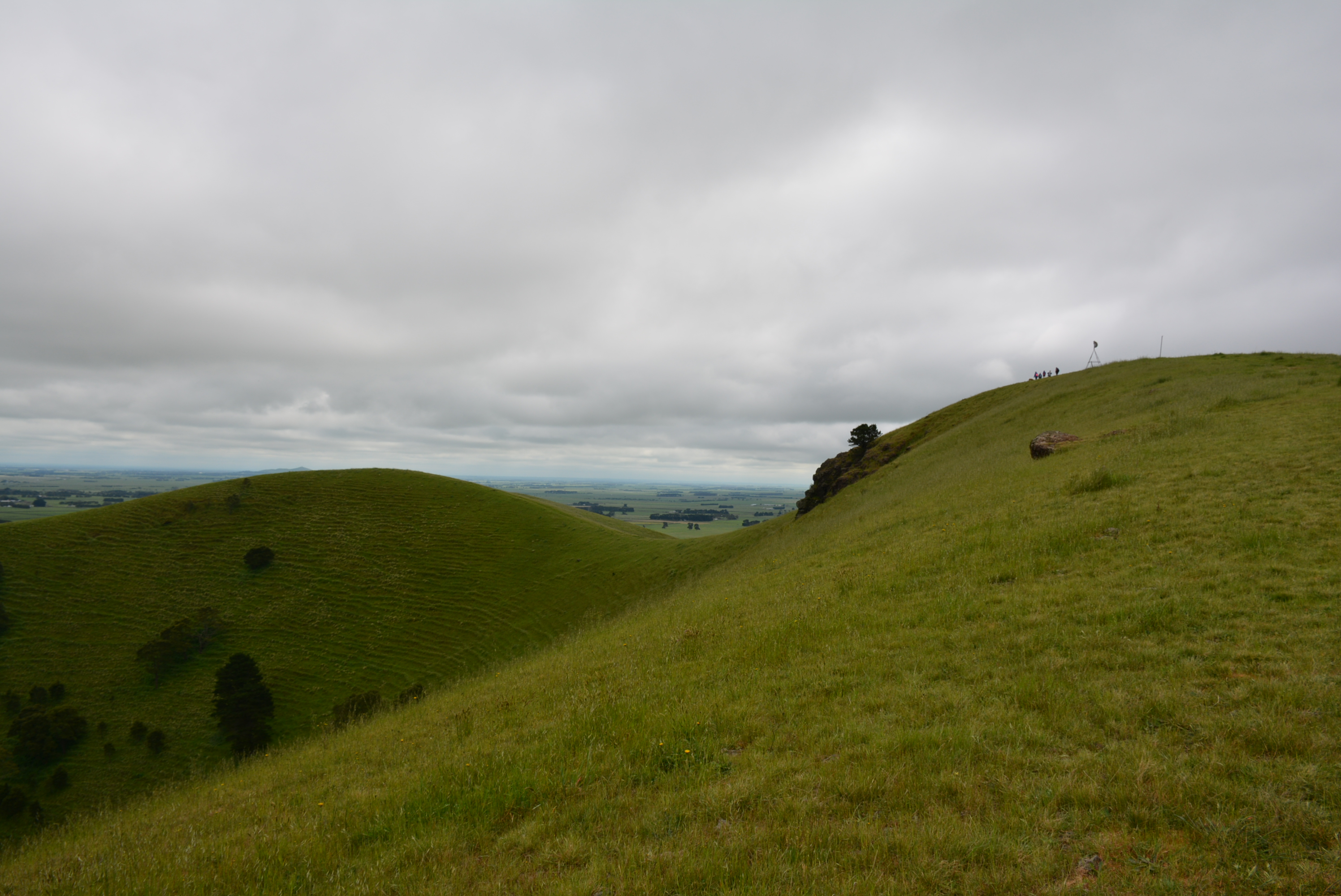
Mount Noorat crater and summit, featured in Marshall's books

Marshall wrote numerous short stories, mainly set in the bush, and also wrote newspaper columns and magazine articles. He also collected and published Indigenous Australian stories and legends. He travelled widely in Australia and overseas.

His literary friends and associates included John Morrison and Clem Christesen. Australian poet and contemporary, Hal Porter, wrote in 1965 that Marshall was:

... the warmest and most centralized human being ... To walk with ease and nonchalance the straight, straight line between appearing tragic and appearing willfully brave is a feat so complex I should not like to have to rake in the dark for the super-bravery to accomplish it.

In 1972, he collaborated with Australian writer B. Wongar to publish a collection of stories titled Aboriginal Myths.

== Personal life and death ==
Marshall married Olive Dulcie Dixon in May 1941 and they had two daughters, Katherine and Jennifer. The couple divorced in 1957. For many years he lived in the Melbourne bayside suburb of Sandringham.

Marshall died on 21 January 1984, in a nursing home in Brighton East, Victoria, where he had been a resident for the previous two years.

== Television series ==
In 1981 the Australian Broadcasting Corporation produced a nine-part mini-series based on Marshall's autobiographical stories. Adam Garnett won the 1982 Logie Award for Best Performance by a Juvenile, for his role as Alan Marshall in the series. The TV series achieved popularity in Australia, the UK, and also in the USSR, where it was the first Australian TV series to be shown by a major TV channel.

== Recognition ==
In 1979 Alan Marshall unveiled a plaque on a monument to himself at his birthplace in Noorat.

Marshall was made a Member of the Order of Australia in the 1981 Australia Day Honours.

In 1985 the Shire of Eltham, where Marshall had lived for many years, established the annual Alan Marshall Short Story Competition for emergent writers.

There is a bronze bust of him and a plaque in the Sandringham Library, Melbourne.

Sculptor Marcus Skipper created a realistic statue of Marshall cast in bronze which is located in the front of Eltham Library, a branch of Yarra Plenty Regional Library. It has been classified as significant by the National Trust.

Alan Marshall Reserve, Eltham is located on the corner of Main Road and Leane Drive, and has been there since at least 2007.

== Bibliography ==
=== Autobiography ===
- I Can Jump Puddles. Melbourne: F. W. Cheshire, 1955.
- This is the Grass. Melbourne: F. W. Cheshire, 1962. ISBN 1-743-31486-8.
- In Mine Own Heart. Melbourne: F. W. Cheshire, 1963.

=== Collections ===
- The Complete Stories of Alan Marshall, with illustrations by Noel Counihan. Melbourne: Thomas Nelson ISBN 017005215X
- Aboriginal Myths, with Sreten Bozic. Melbourne: Gold Star Publications, 1972. ISBN 0-7260-0113-9
- Pull Down The Blind, with illustrations by Noel Counihan. Melbourne: F. W. Cheshire & London: Wadley & Ginn, 1949
- Hammers Over The Anvil. Melbourne: Thomas Nelson, 1975 ISBN 0170050610

=== Non-fiction ===
- These are My People. Melbourne: F.W. Cheshire, 1944
- Ourselves Writ Strange. Melbourne: F. W. Cheshire, 1948, later reprinted as These Were My Tribesmen
- Pioneers & Painters: One hundred years of Eltham and its Shire, Thomas Nelson, 1971 ISBN 0170019489

=== Fiction ===
- How Beautiful Are Thy Feet. Melbourne: Chesterhill Press, 1949. ISBN 0-14-005241-0
- Fight for Life North Melbourne: Cassell Australia, [1972]

=== Children's Fiction ===
- Whispering in the Wind. Thomas Nelson (Australia) Ltd, 1969. ISBN 0-00-670500-6
