= Mercy Regional College =

Coordinates: 38.2343°S 143.1398°E

Location
- Henderson Street (McAuley Senior Campus), MacKinnons Bridge Rd (O'Keeffe Junior Campus); Camperdown (McAuley), Noorat (O'Keefe), Victoria; Australia

Information
- Type: Catholic, day
- Established: 1973; 53 years ago
- Principal: Sharon Gillet
- Enrolment: 447 (2019)
- Colours: Maroon, white
- Website: http://www.mercy.vic.edu.au/

Mercy Regional College is a Catholic, co-educational, secondary college in Camperdown, Victoria, Australia. It currently serves students from years 7 to 12 located across its two campuses, McAuley Campus and O'Keeffe Campus. McAuley campus is the main campus located in Camperdown, Victoria and O'Keffe Campus being located in Noorat, Victoria.

Mercy Regional College has been educating since 1973 and serves the parishes of Camperdown, Mortlake, Terang and Timboon in the Ballarat Diocese.

The school consists of a junior school (years 7 and 8), middle school (years 9 and 10) and a senior school (years 11 and 12). The senior school offers VCE, VET, SBAT and VM (previously known as VCAL).

== Notable former students ==
- Lewis Taylor – AFL footballer
- Sean Darcy – AFL footballer
- Scott Lucas – AFL footballer
- Ken Hinkley - AFL footballer and coach
- Josh Hose - OAM and Paralympian
