= Dalvui =

Historic homestead in Victoria, Australia

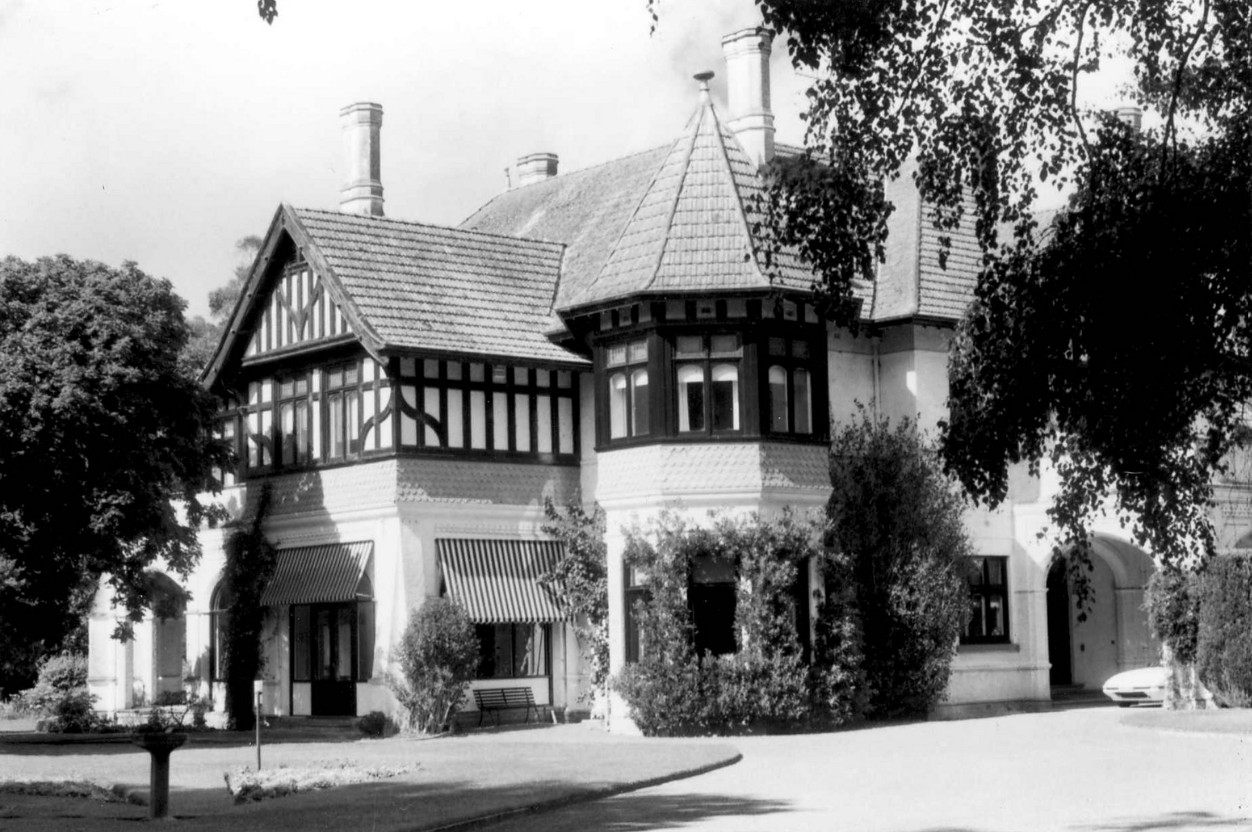
- Dalvui, 1981

- Location in the Corangamite Shire, Victoria
- 38°12′01″S 142°56′58″E
- Type: Homestead, associated built facilities and grounds
- Location: Noorat, Victoria, Australia
- Nearest city: Warrnambool

History
- Built: 1907
- Built for: Neil Walter Black

Site notes
- Architect(s): Beverley Ussher, Henry Kemp
- Architectural style: Queen Anne

Dalvui is a Federation-era homestead and landscaped rural estate located near Noorat in western Victoria, Australia. The property is significant for its association with the Black pastoral dynasty, its 1907-era homestead designed by architects Beverley Ussher and Henry Kemp, and its garden originally planned by noted landscape designer William Guilfoyle.

== History ==
The origins of Dalvui are tied to the establishment of large pastoral holdings in western Victoria in the early colonial period. In 1839, Scottish pastoralist Niel Black settled in the region and acquired stock and grazing rights to a 43,520-acre (17,610 ha) run near Lake Terang, which he named Glenormiston in partnership with William Steuart and Thomas Gladstone of Scotland. The estate developed into one of the major pastoral enterprises of the Western District.

In 1868, the partnership was dissolved and the land divided into three portions, allocated by drawing at the Melbourne Club. Black received the southern portion, which he named "Mount Noorat".

After Niel Black's death in 1880, his holdings were divided among his sons: Mount Noorat passed to Archibald Black, Glenormiston House passed to Steuart Black, and Dalvui was inherited by his youngest son, Niel Walter Black. Dalvui itself comprised approximately 6,000 acres (2,430 ha) at the time of inheritance.

In the late nineteenth century, Niel Walter Black began developing Dalvui as a grand rural estate. Between 1898 and 1900, he engaged landscape designer William Guilfoyle to design a formal garden surrounding the planned homestead.

Plantings in the garden include Canary Island date palm, lindens, coral tree, jacarandas, flowering-gum, tricolor beeches, copper beeches, Atlas cedar, Queensland kauri, horse chestnuts, elms, and sweet pittosporums. Two large linden trees were later destroyed in a storm in 2010.

Black intended Dalvui, completed in 1907, to be a major family residence, and by 1909 he was travelling to Scotland to collect his cousin and fiancée Miss May Leadbetter, with plans for her to live at the completed house. However that year, he died at sea aboard the SS Waratah, which disappeared without trace off the coast of southern Africa with all passengers lost.

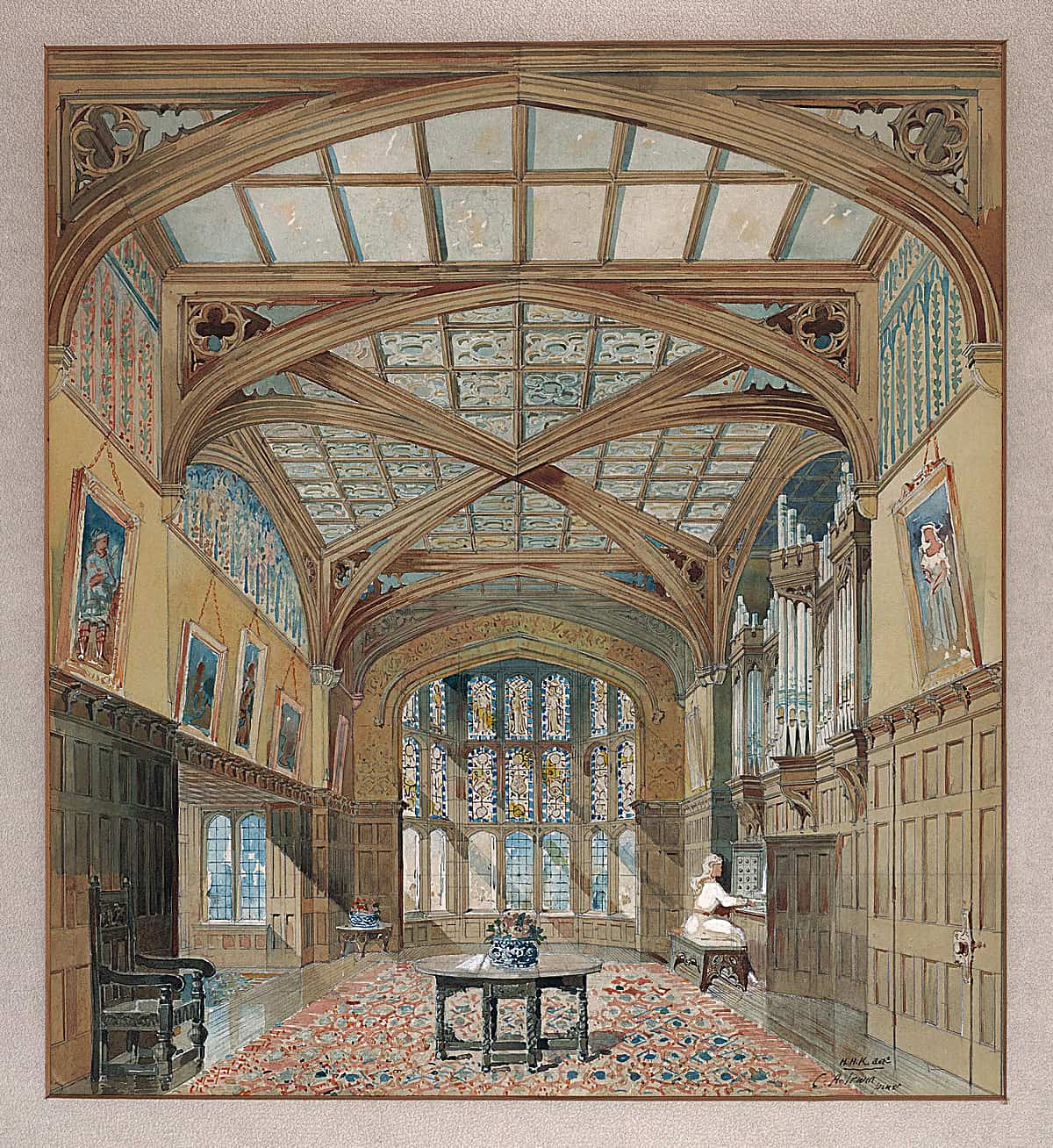
The organ room at Dalvui

Following Black's death, his estate was formally distributed in 1911. A pipe organ that was installed in the house, originally built by Hill & Son of London and installed a few months before Black's departure, was installed in the Chapel of All Saints, Geelong Grammar School, Niel's alma mater. Dalvui homestead and about 400 acres (162 ha) were purchased by Claude and Marjory Palmer, marking the beginning of more than six decades of continuous Palmer family ownership. At the time of purchase, Guilfoyle's garden remained incomplete and immature. Marjory Palmer undertook the development of the landscape, importing a head gardener from England and employing additional staff to continue Guilfoyle's original vision. Rose breeder Alister Clark named a rose after Marjory Palmer in 1936.

After Claude Palmer's death in 1941, Marjory Palmer remained at Dalvui for several years before relocating. The property then passed to their son Neville Palmer and his wife Beth, who continued to develop the gardens with professional gardening staff. During the 1950s, Beth Palmer oversaw further enhancements to the estate, including the construction of a hard-surfaced tennis court and the landscaping of a swimming pool area with paving influenced by Edna Walling-style design. She also designed and helped construct elements of the garden herself.

In the 1960s, additional landscape works were undertaken, including redesign and construction of ponds, and the installation of wisteria and rose-covered arches.

Between 1975 and 1981, Dalvui was owned by Max and Margaret Donald, followed by Raymond Williams from 1982 until 1997. Since 1997, Dalvui has been owned by Peter and Pam Habersberger, who had previously lived at Ingleby near Winchelsea.

== See also ==
- Chapel of All Saints, Geelong Grammar School
- SS Waratah
