= Mount Noorat =

Mountain in Victoria, Australia

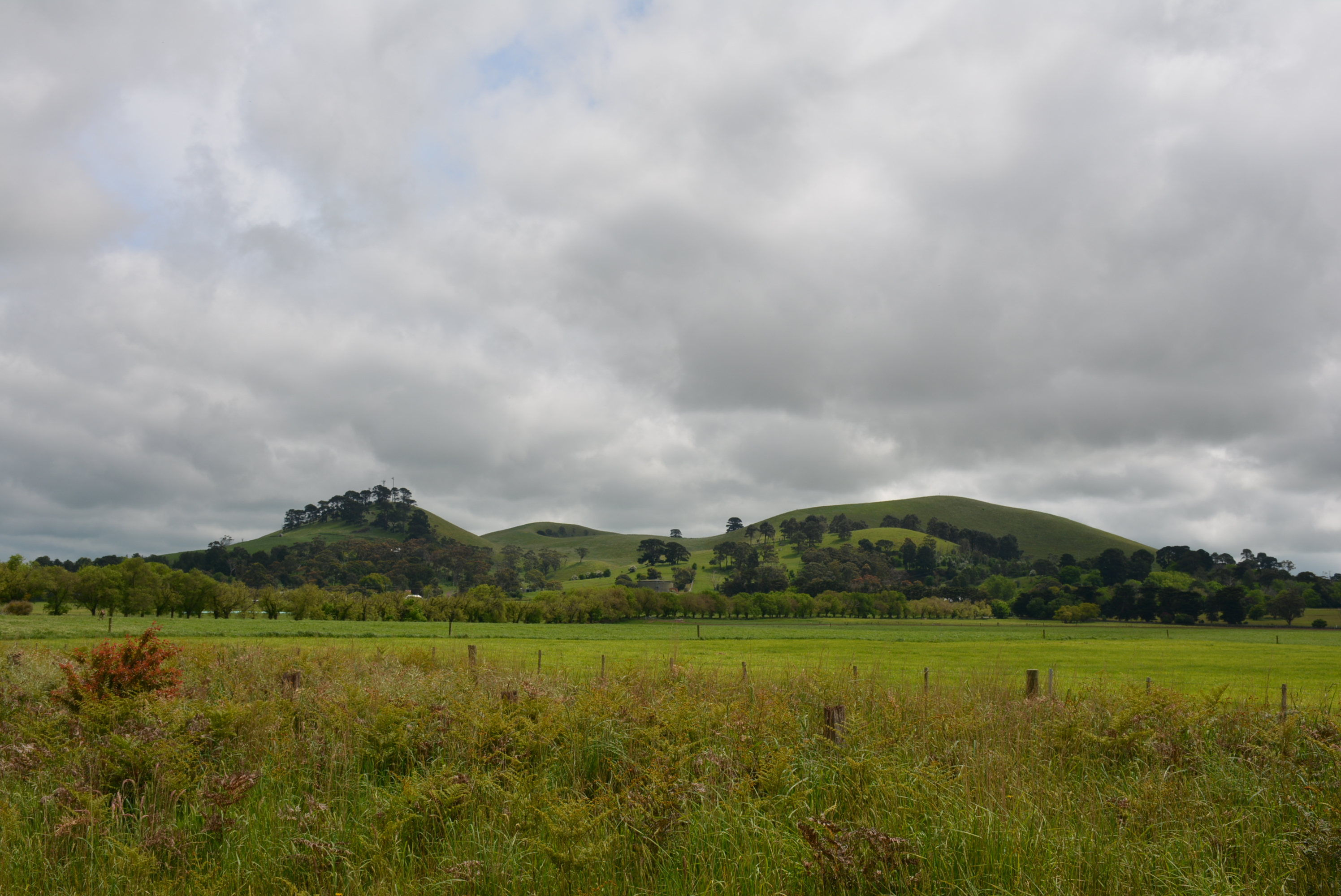
Mount Noorat

Mount Noorat is a dormant volcano, situated on Glenormiston Road north of the township of Noorat, and approximately six kilometres north of Terang, Victoria, Australia. The last eruption is estimated to have occurred between 5,000 and 20,000 years ago.

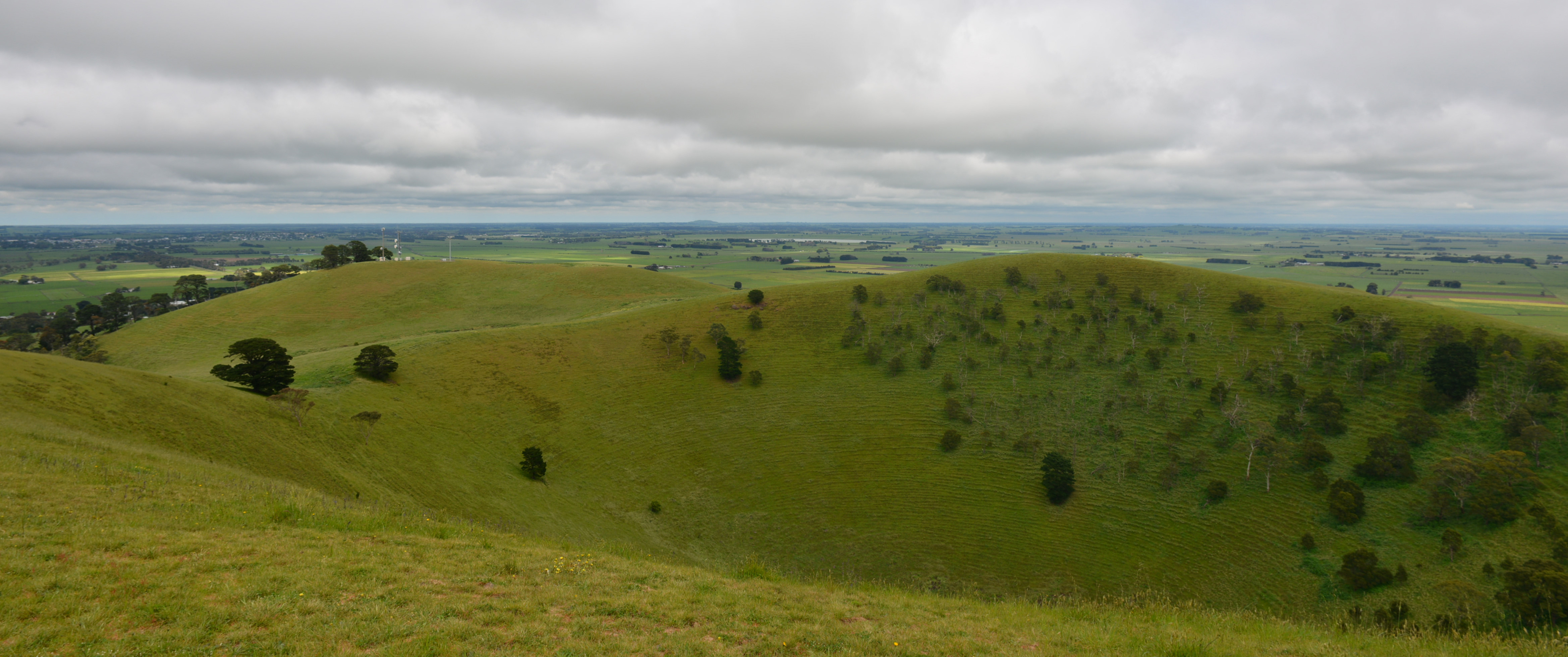
Mount Noorat crater

Mount Noorat is a major volcano of the Newer Volcanics Province of Victoria, with a peak height of 310 metres above sea level and a crater between 160 and 200 metres. It is characterised by multiple vents, a complex topography, and the deepest scoria enclosed crater in Victoria. The mount illustrates a transition from maar eruption to scoria cone development, and includes megacryst and xenolith.

== Legacy ==
The Mount was historically a traditional meeting and trading place for the district's Indigenous peoples, the Kirrae Wuurong, who exchanged stones, spears, skins and other material. Its scoria was used on the district's early roads.

== See also ==
- List of mountains in Australia § Victoria
- List of volcanoes in Australia
