= Noorat =

- Town
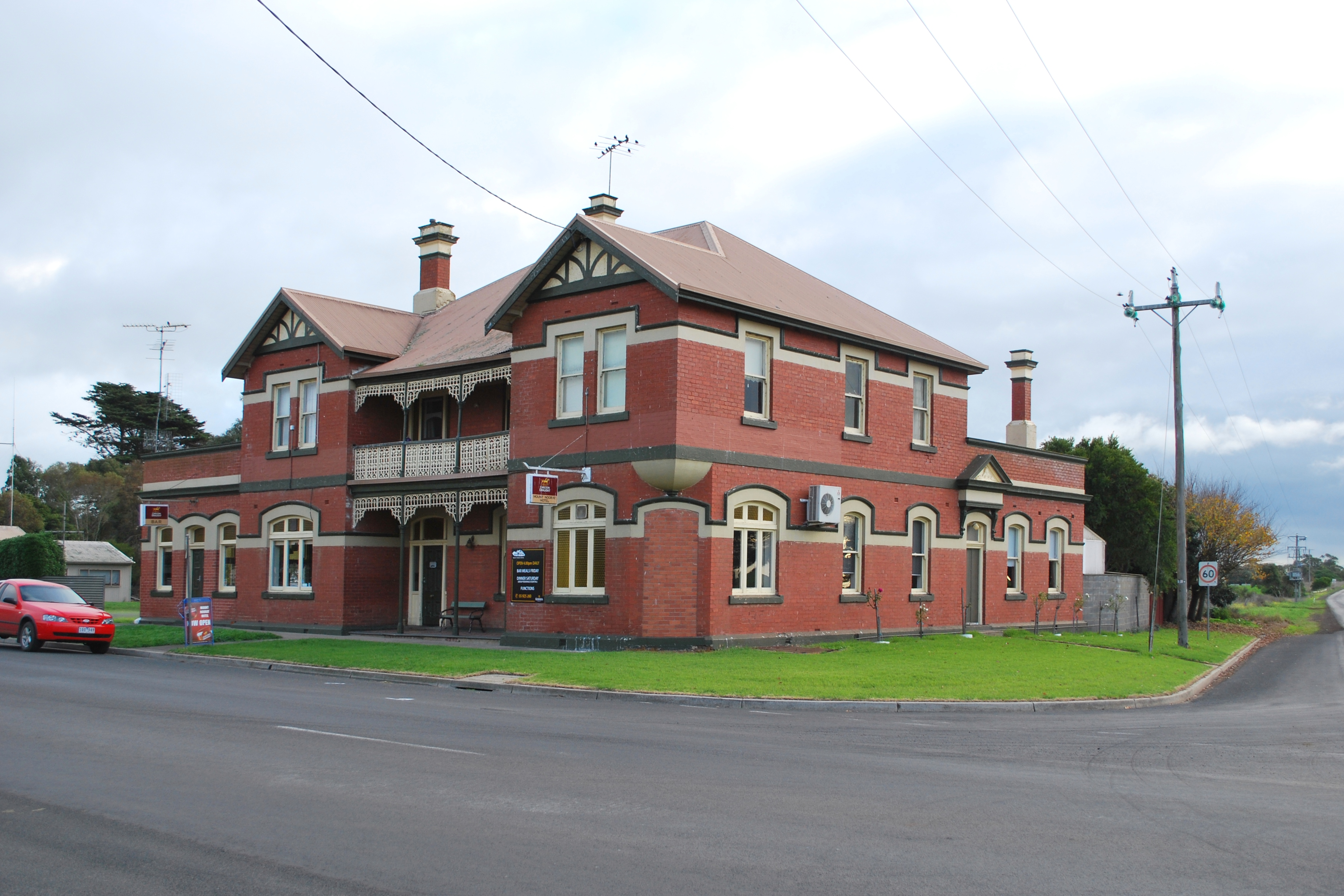
- Mount Noorat Hotel

- Coordinates: 38°11′0″S 142°56′0″E
- Country: Australia
- State: Victoria
- LGA: Corangamite Shire
- Location: 211 km (131 mi) SW of Melbourne; 145 km (90 mi) W of Geelong; 52 km (32 mi) NE of Warrnambool; 8 km (5.0 mi) N of Terang

Government
  - State electorate: Polwarth
  - Federal division: Wannon

Population
  - Total: 219 (2016 census)
- Postcode: 3265

Noorat is a small township in southwestern Victoria, Australia. Noorat is located approximately 211 km west of Melbourne. The township is located at the base of Mount Noorat, a dormant volcano, which is considered to have Australia's largest dry crater. At the 2006 census, Noorat had a population of 252. By 2011, according to the census, the population had dropped to 167, although this drop in numbers is a bit deceptive as the town boundary was changed in between the 2006 and 2011 census.

Noorat derives its name from Mount Noorat, a dormant volcano named by explorer Major Thomas Mitchell after a local Indigenous elder, Ngoora. Europeans first settled the Noorat area in early 1839 when MacKillop and Smith established a run called Strathdownie – which was renamed Glenormiston by Niel Black, a Gaelic-speaking Scotsman from Cowall in Argyll who purchased the property in 1840.

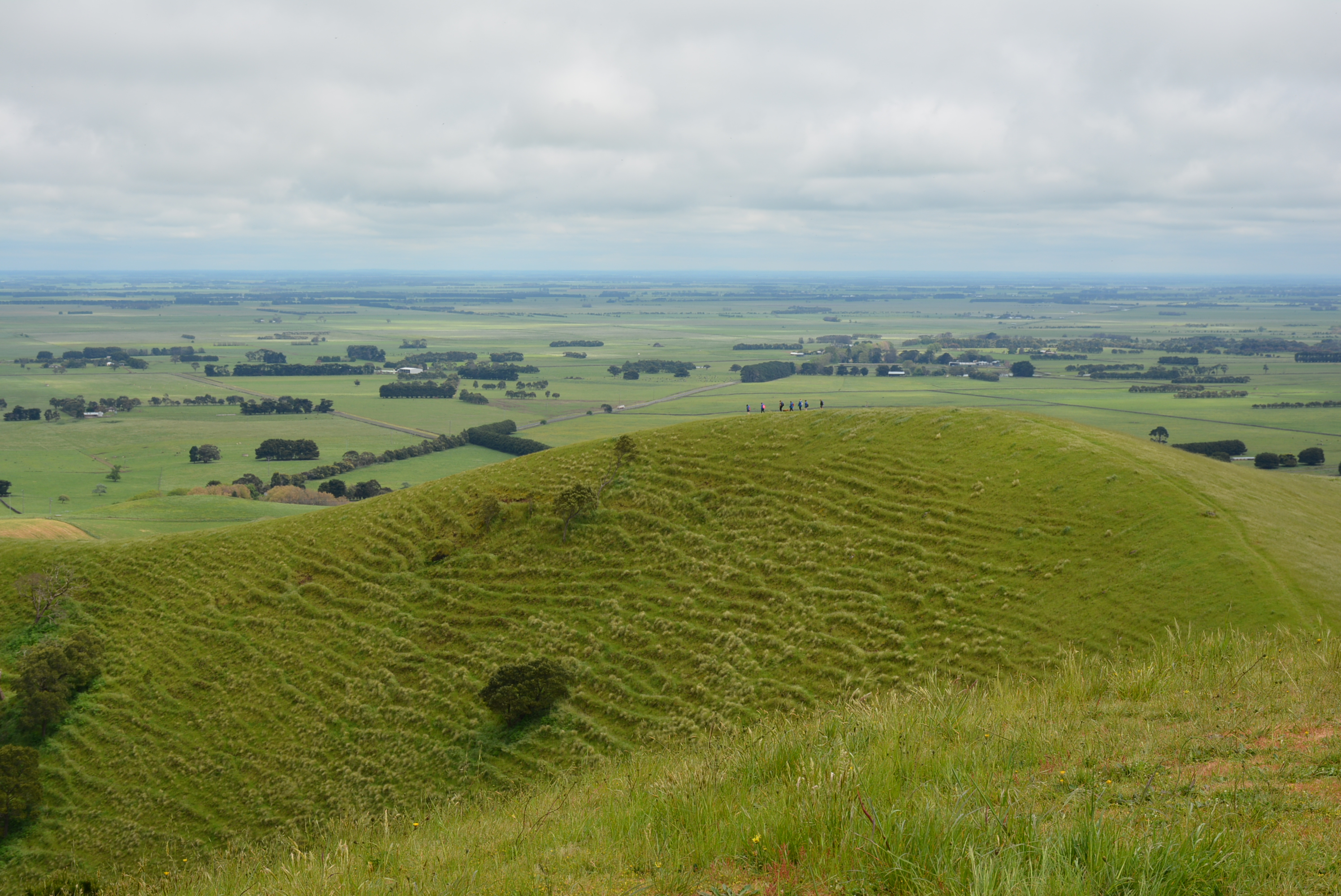
Walkers on the crater rim of Mount Noorat

Prior to European settlement, the area near Mount Noorat was a traditional meeting site where Indigenous tribes – the Kirrae Wuurong people – held ceremonies, bartered goods and settled disputes. There are conflicting reports about the number of Indigenous people living in the district at the time of white settlement, but in 1841, the population of the Mount Noorat clan numbered only four people. An outbreak of smallpox during the 1830s was one cause of the population decline and it has been suggested that an alleged massacre of Indigenous people by white settlers was another.

Frederick Taylor, MacKillop and Smith's manager at Strathdownie was responsible for one of the worst massacres in the western district of Victoria somewhere along Mount Emu Creek (once known as Taylor's River) near Noorat in August 1839. This was verified by Niel Black, who found a mass grave on the Glenormiston property.

The settlement history of Noorat is closely linked with the Black family and the establishment of Glenormiston. Noorat ostensibly grew as a service centre for the Black family estate and many of the early residents either emigrated with Niel Black or worked at Glenormiston.

The post office opened on 1 August 1874 as Mount Noorat, and was renamed Noorat in 1875.

Noted author, Alan Marshall, was born in Noorat's general store, in 1902.

There is currently one place of public worship in Noorat, the Neil Black Memorial Presbyterian Church.

The township has two schools, Noorat Primary School, and the Noorat campus of Mercy Regional College, which houses the year 7 and 8 students of the school. There is also the senior campus at Camperdown. The Glenormiston campus of South West Institute of TAFE is located a few kilometres north-east of the township, on the other side of the mountain.

Noorat has a local football team, the Kolora-Noorat Power, who merged in 2002 from the Noorat Bombers and Kolora Magpies. They compete in the Warrnambool & District Football League. Their colours are teal, black and white.

== See also ==
- Dalvui
