= Gornja Trešnjevica =

- Village
- Location within Serbia
- Coordinates: 44°13′N 20°33′E
- Country: Serbia
- District: Šumadija
- Municipality: Aranđelovac

Population (2002)
  - Total: 583
- Time zone: UTC+1 (CET)
  - Summer (DST): UTC+2 (CEST)

Gornja Trešnjevica (Serbian: Горња Трешњевица) is a village in the municipality of Aranđelovac, Serbia. According to the 2002 census, the village has a population of 583 people.

== Gallery ==
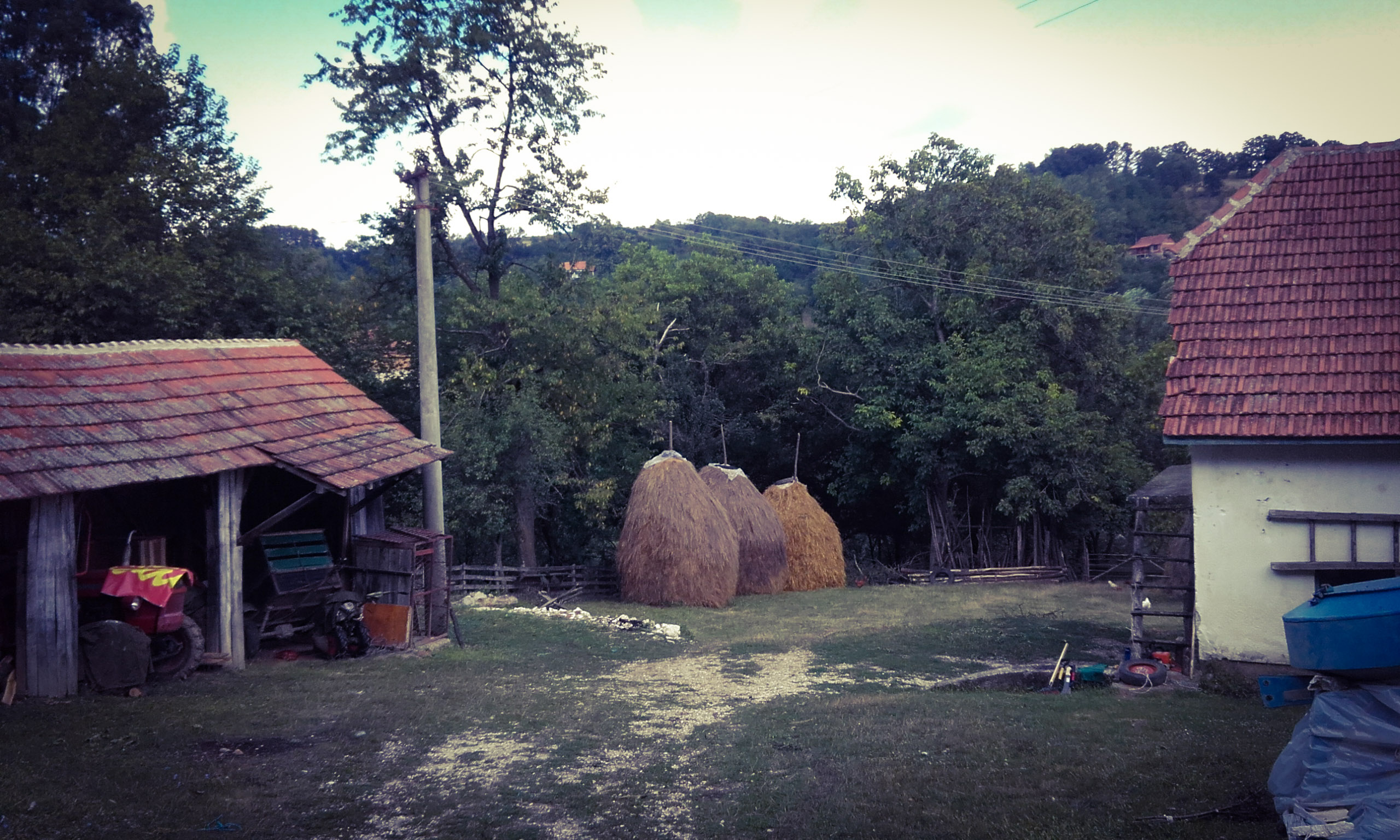
Gornja Trešnjevica

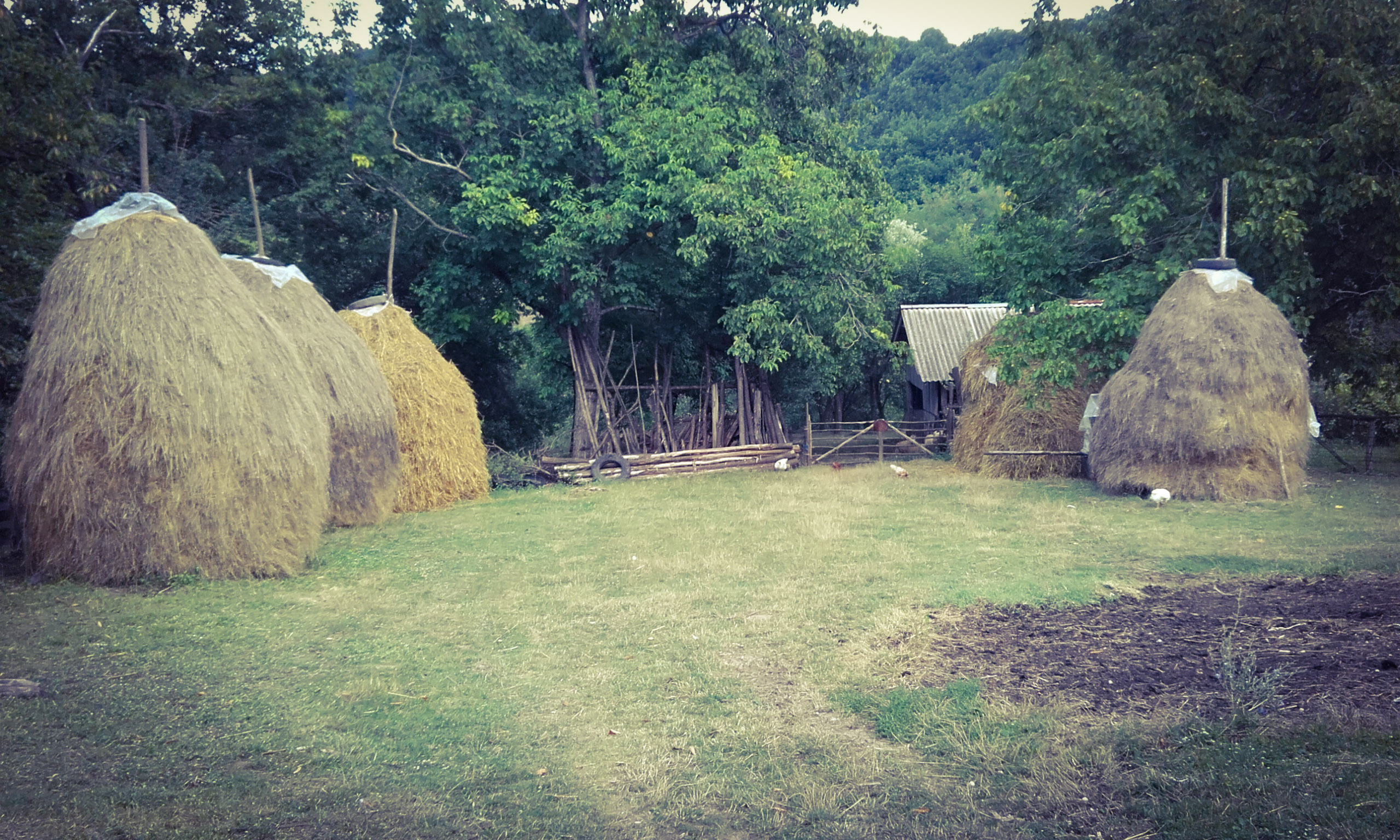
Gornja Trešnjevica 2
