= Yami Lester =

Australian activist

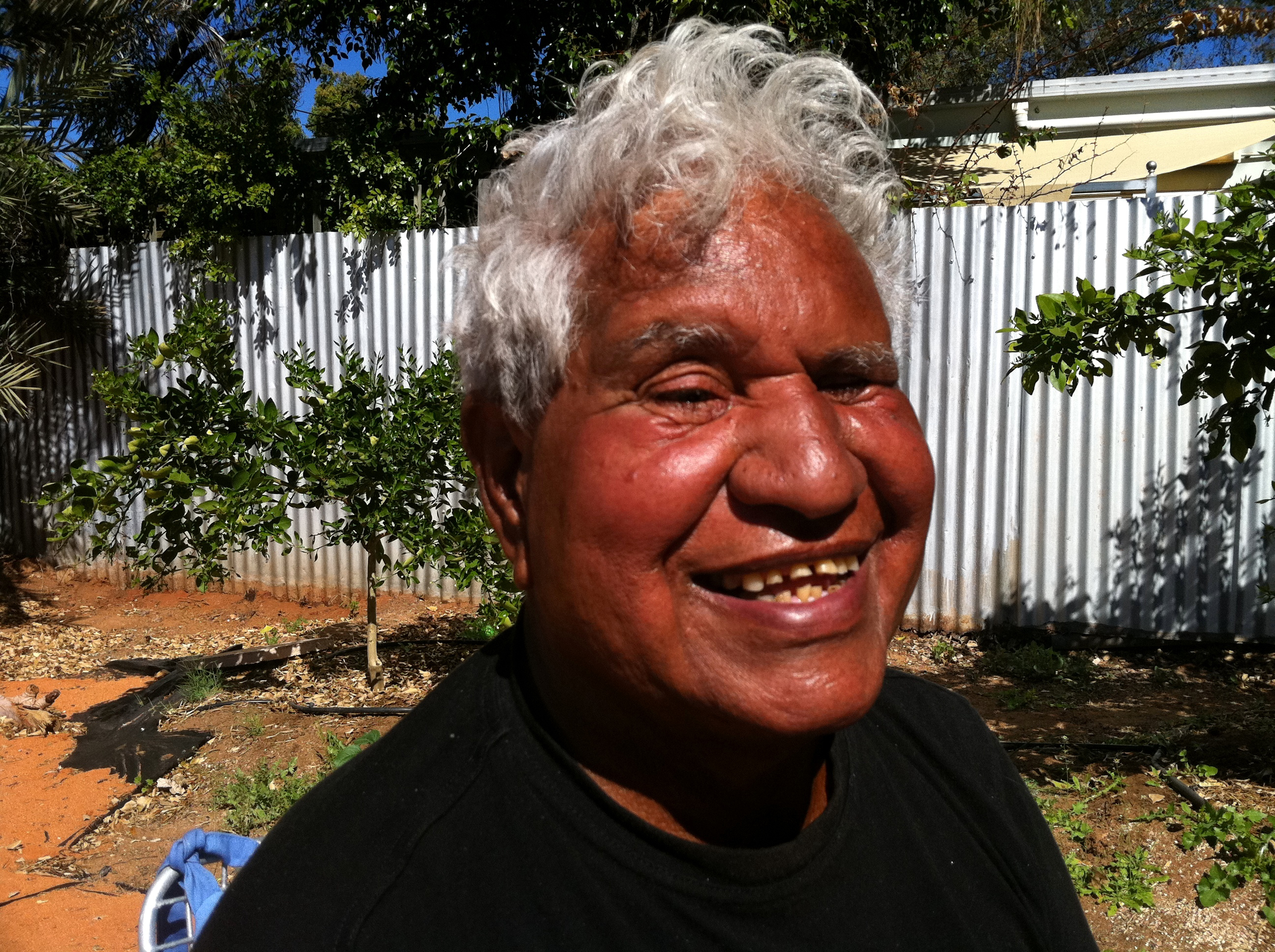
Yami Lester

James Yami Lester OAM (1941 – 21 July 2017) was an Indigenous rights activist of northern South Australia, best known for his anti-nuclear activism.

== Early life ==
James Yami Lester was born at Walytjatjata in the Anangu Pitjantjatjara Yankunytjatjara Lands of South Australia in 1941. He was a Yankunytjatjara man.

On 15 October 1953 he was blinded by a "black mist" (explosion of the atomic bomb Emu 1) from the south. After the mist passed, his family's camp experienced sudden deaths, outbreaks of skin rashes, vomiting, diarrhoea and temporary and permanent blindness. Yami has said that some of the people were so weak they could not get down to the nearby waterhole and skim the black scum off the water which came from the black cloud, and actually died of thirst. It is generally accepted that this black mist was fallout from British nuclear tests at Maralinga and Emu Junction which were taking place at that time.

== Activism ==
As a young man, Lester joined the Aborigines' Advancement League of South Australia in Adelaide in 1967, but he wanted to take more direct action, in the manner of Charles Perkins, probably the most prominent Indigenous activist at that time.

He began work for the United Mission in Alice Springs, as a welfare worker and interpreter for the courts. He later became involved in the Institute of Aboriginal Development, which was concerned with Aboriginal education and language. Lester took a great interest in cross-cultural issues and programs.

After a position administering business affairs for the Mimili community, Lester worked with the Pitjantjatjara Land Council on Aboriginal lands rights issues with the South Australian Government. He worked as an organiser and interpreter assisting the handover of freehold title to the Anangu people in 1981, which came about as a result of the Pitjantjatjara Land Rights Act (SA).

Lester's most significant contribution to the rights of Aboriginal people was helping gain recognition for the atomic tests at Maralinga and an acknowledgement for the 1800 Aboriginal people affected.

His actions helped lead to the McClelland Royal Commission in 1985, which found significant radiation hazards still existed at the Maralinga test sites. Recommendations included group compensation for the Maralinga Tjarutja people and an extensive, long-term cleanup operation to restore the land.

== Later life, death, and legacy ==
Lester retired to his traditional home at Walatina Station near Marla in the far north of South Australia. He died on 21 July 2017 in Alice Springs, Northern Territory, at the age of 75.

His legacy and impact still lives on in through the lives of his relatives, including Kate Lester. The prime minister of Australia, Malcolm Turnbull, paid tribute to Lester, describing him as "one of the most significant Aboriginal leaders our country has known".

As part of an arts project undertaken in 2026 by the Malinauskas state government honouring six prominent Indigenous South Australians, a statue of Lester is to be erected in Adelaide.

== Personal life ==
Lester had three children: Rosemary, Leroy, and Karina, a translator and activist.

== See also ==
- British nuclear tests at Maralinga
- McClelland Royal Commission
