= T. B. Moore =

Explorer of Australia (1850–1919)

Thomas Bather Moore (1850 – 1919) was a pioneer explorer of Western and South West, Tasmania, Australia.

== Biography ==
He was born at New Norfolk, Van Diemen's Land and died at Queenstown. He was buried at the graveyard Strahan overlooking Macquarie Harbour.

He was appointed as a Fellow of the Royal Geographical Society. He had been a prospector, track cutter, botanist, geographer and geologist – all mainly in West Coast, Tasmania area.

His tracks were legendary routes through parts of the South West Wilderness, as well as the West Coast Range. He had been considered one of the most experienced of Mount Lyell Mining and Railway Company's track cutters.

Western Tasmania: A land of Riches and Beauty, was dedicated to his memory. In part of the dedication Charles Whitham states:

Thomas Moore was the first in place, though not in time, of those who have explored Western Tasmania. He traversed every portion of the territory, sometimes as a prospector.... his knowledge of this region was never equalled by any other, and will never be surpassed.

— Charles Whitham in Western Tasmania

== Naming of Tasmanian landscape ==
He named many features including Mount Strahan, the Thureau Hills and the Tofft River which runs between those hills and Mount Huxley.

Whitham says in his book T.B. Moore that Moore "laid it down that all western lakes must have feminine names", which Whitham guessed would be ignored by bureaucrats in Hobart. Hydro Tasmania has since created lakes which have names that do not follow Moore's suggestion.

Author abbreviation
