= Mount Jukes (Tasmania) =

Mountain in Western Tasmania, Australia

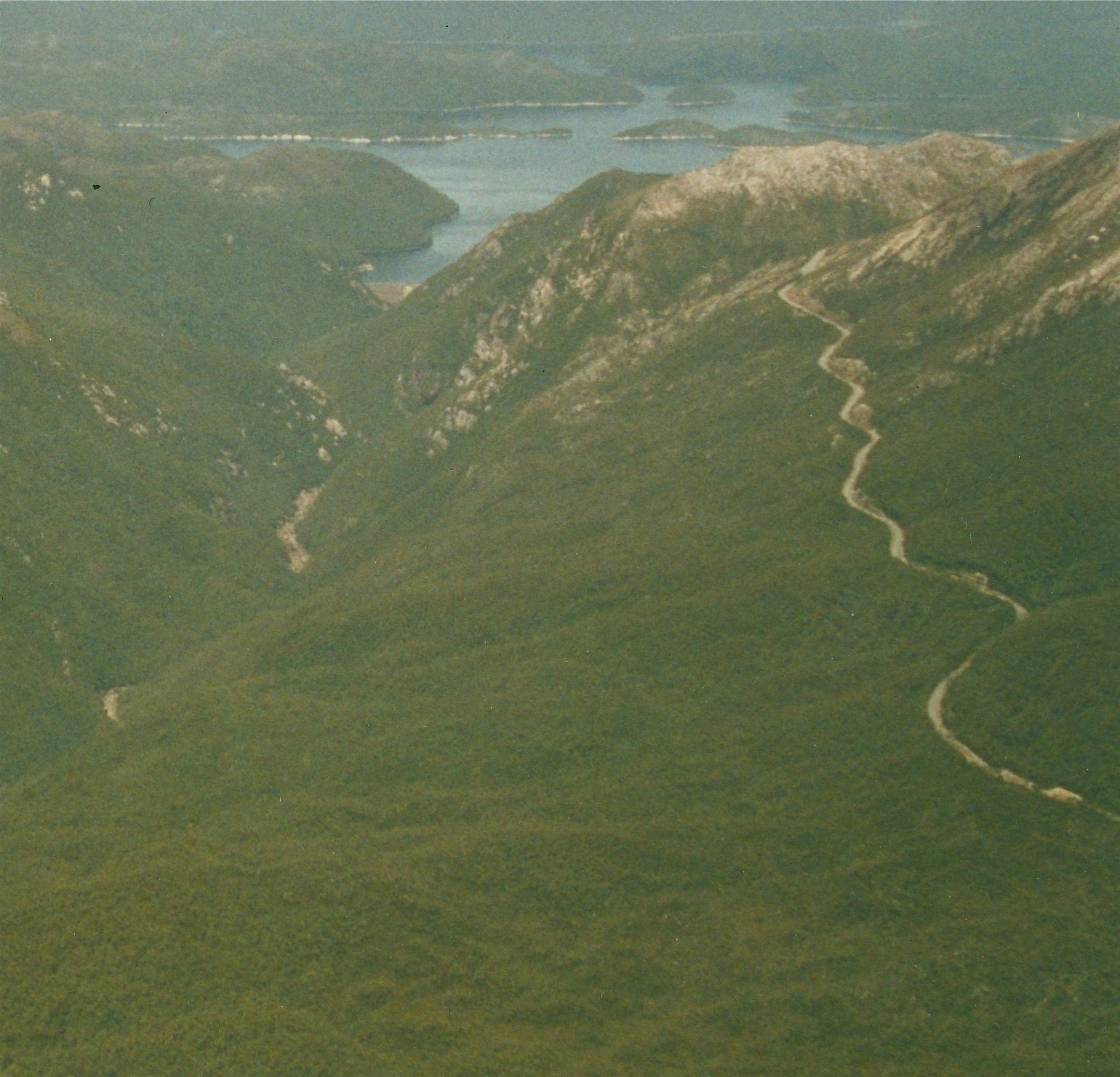
- Aerial photograph of lower slopes of Mount Huxley (to the left), King River gorge in the left lower, Crotty Dam and Lake Burbury (to the rear), northern slopes (that is Proprietary Peak) of Mount Jukes on the right, Mount Jukes Road in right foreground, and to the right rear the different coloured upper part of East Jukes Peak.

Highest point
- Elevation: 1,168 m (3,832 ft)
- Prominence: 911 m (2,989 ft)
- Isolation: 23.09 km (14.35 mi)
- Coordinates: 42°10′12″S 145°34′48″E

Geography
- Location within Tasmania
- Location: West Coast, Tasmania, Australia
- Parent range: Jukes Range, West Coast Range
- Topo maps: Owen 3833; Darwin 3832

Geology
- Rock age: Jurassic

Mount Jukes is a mountain located on the Jukes Range, a spur off the West Coast Range, in the West Coast region of Tasmania, Australia.

With an elevation of 1,168 metres (3,832 ft) above sea level, with multiple peaks, and glacial lakes on its upper eastern reaches, Mount Jukes is situated above the town of Crotty and is west of Lake Burbury.

The mountain was named by Charles Gould in 1862 in honour of Professor Joseph Jukes, an English geologist who gathered evidence to part afforded support for Charles Darwin's theories of coral reefs. Jukes had visited Hobart in 1842-3 on HMS Fly.

== Mines ==
It has had mines and small mining camps adjacent to the lakes, and on the northern upper slopes, near where the Mount Jukes road traverses the upper slopes of the King River Gorge.

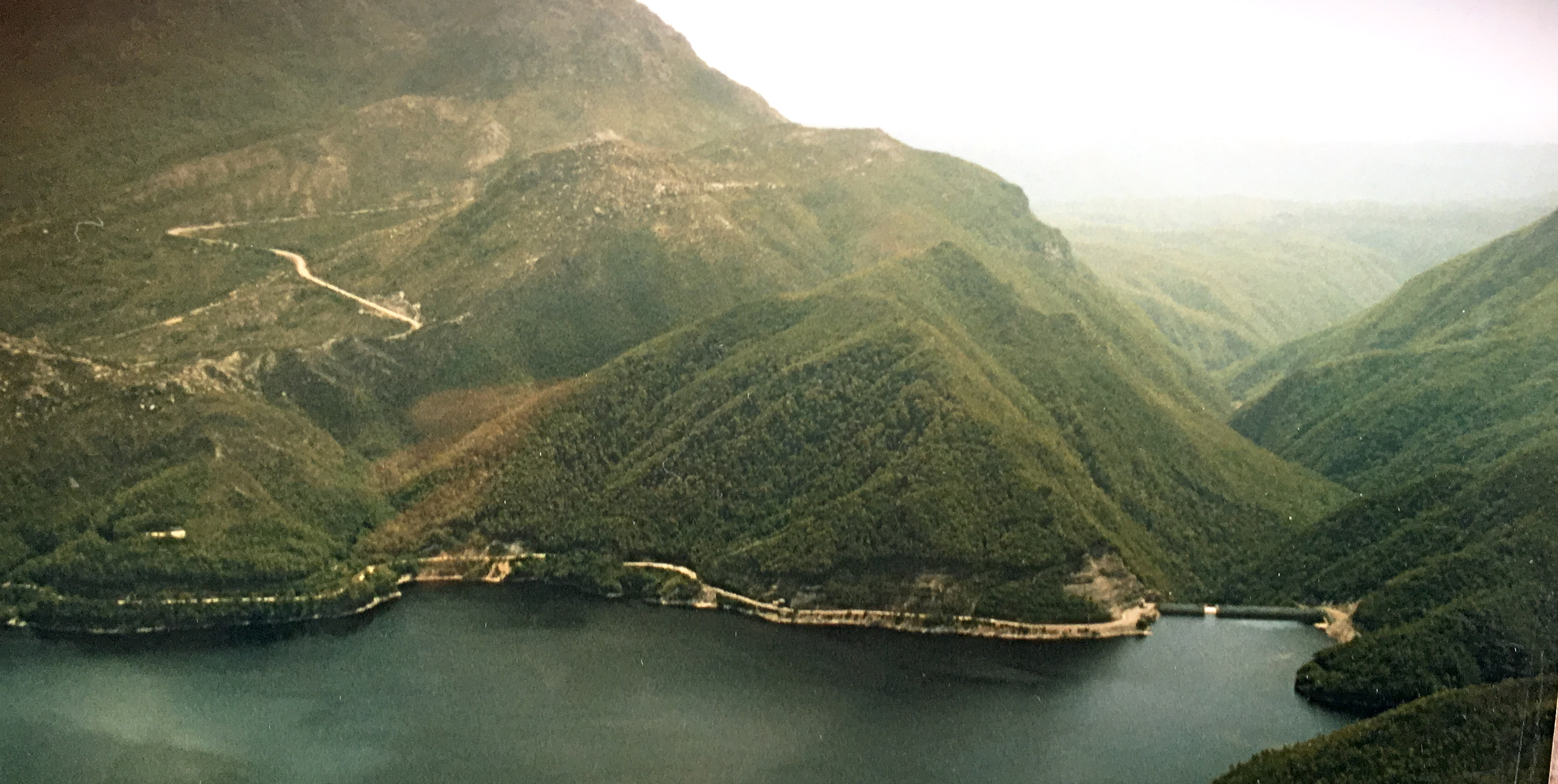
Aerial view of north east corner of Mount Jukes from the east, with Lake Burbury in view, and Crotty Dam at the right

== Access and features ==
The Mount Jukes Road (22 kilometres (14 mi) in length) was constructed by the Hydro in the 1980s at the time the Crotty Dam was made. It connects southern Queenstown with Darwin Dam, where the previously utilised North Mount Lyell Railway formation between the Linda Valley and Crotty was submerged by Lake Burbury.

Two named glacial lakes in the upper part of the eastern side of the mountain are the Upper Lake Jukes and the Lower Lake Jukes. It is by the lakes that a number of small mines were started in the early years of the twentieth century.

Mount Huxley is located to the north and Mount Darwin is located to the south.

=== Peaks and spurs ===
Mount Jukes has a number of named features:

- Jukes Range – the ridge between Proprietary Peak in the north, and South Jukes Peak
- Mount Jukes – 1,168 metres (3,832 ft)
- Proprietary Peak – 1,104 metres (3,622 ft), north west of main part of Mount Jukes, with the Crown Spur the most noticeable feature when viewed from the town of Queenstown to the north.
- Pyramid Peak – 1,080 metres (3,540 ft)
- West Jukes Peak – 1,062 metres (3,484 ft)
- South Jukes Peak – 1,014 metres (3,327 ft)
- East Jukes Peak – 731 metres (2,398 ft), closest to King River Gorge and the Crotty Dam, and to the north of the Mount Jukes Road.
- Central Peak

Some other named features include Yellow Knob, Yellow Knob Spur, South Jukes Spur, Crown Spur, East Jukes Spur, Intercolonial Spur, Cliff Spur, and Newall Spur.

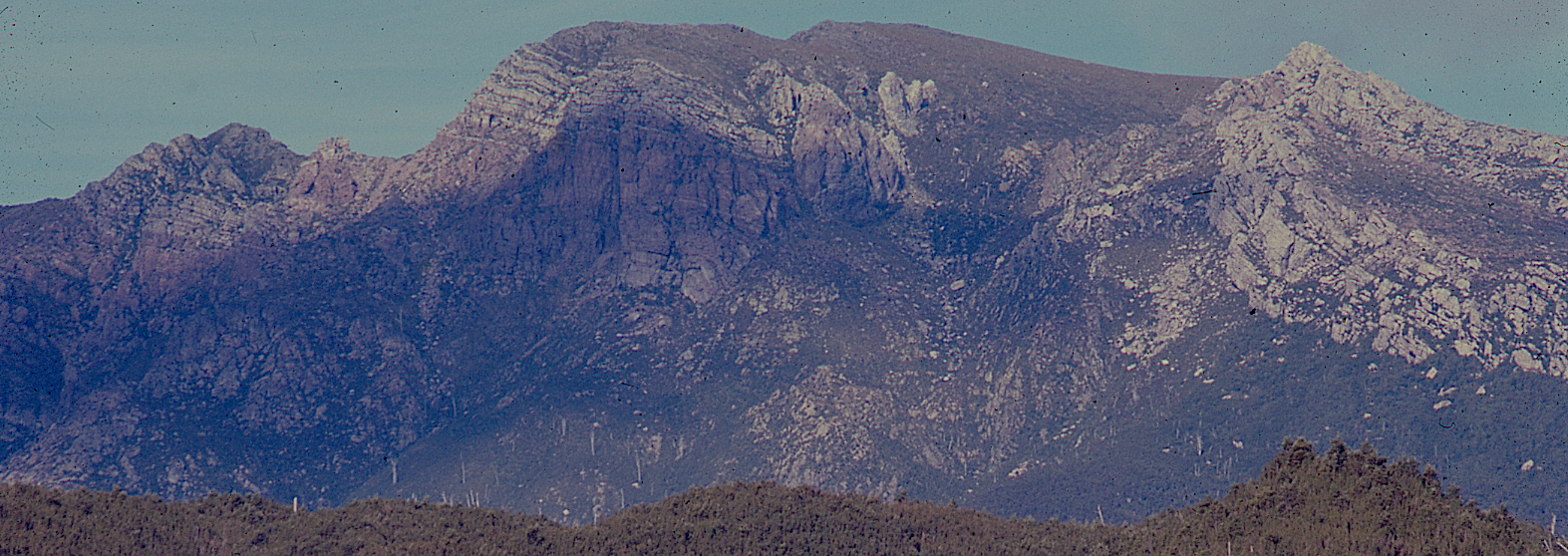
Mount Jukes from the north west

== See also ==
- List of highest mountains of Tasmania
