= Mount Strahan =

Mountain in Australia

- Location within Tasmania

Highest point
- Elevation: 855 m (2,805 ft)
- Coordinates: 42°14′24″S 145°30′36″E

Geography
- Location: West Coast, Tasmania, Australia
- Parent range: West Coast Range

Mount Strahan is a mountain located on the West Coast Range in the West Coast region of Tasmania, Australia. With an elevation of 855 metres (2,805 ft) above sea level, the mountain is situated directly east of Macquarie Harbour and, like Mount Sorell, dominates the east side of the harbour near Sarah Island.

The mountain was named by Thomas Bather Moore in honour of Sir George Strahan, a Governor of Tasmania.
