= Mount Jukes mine sites =

Mine sites on Mount Jukes, in Tasmania

The Mount Jukes mine sites were a series of short-lived, small mine workings high on the upper regions of Mount Jukes in the West Coast Range on the West Coast of Tasmania.

Upper Lake Jukes and Lake Jukes had short lived mining companies incorporating the names of the lakes.

These mine sites (including Jukes Proprietary on the northern edge of Mount Jukes above the King River Gorge) are examples of early twentieth century ingenuity where all equipment was transported with difficulty up small tracks from locations such as Crotty.

Access to parts of the slopes of Mount Jukes have been assisted by the construction of the Mount Jukes road by the HEC following their construction of the King River Dam and the impoundment of Lake Burbury.

== List of mines ==
This list incorporates mines on Mount Darwin as the mineral zone of Mount Jukes is frequently cited as the Jukes-Darwin mineral zone.

- From the north:
- Jukes Proprietary – copper and gold
- Lake Jukes – copper – low grade
- Hydes – copper – low grade
- Hal Jukes – copper – low grade
- Taylours Reward – barite
- East Darwin – copper
- Findons – copper
- Mount Darwin – copper and gold
- Prince Darwin – copper and gold

== See also ==
- List of mines of the West Coast, Tasmania
