= Darwin Dam =

Dam in Tasmania, Australia

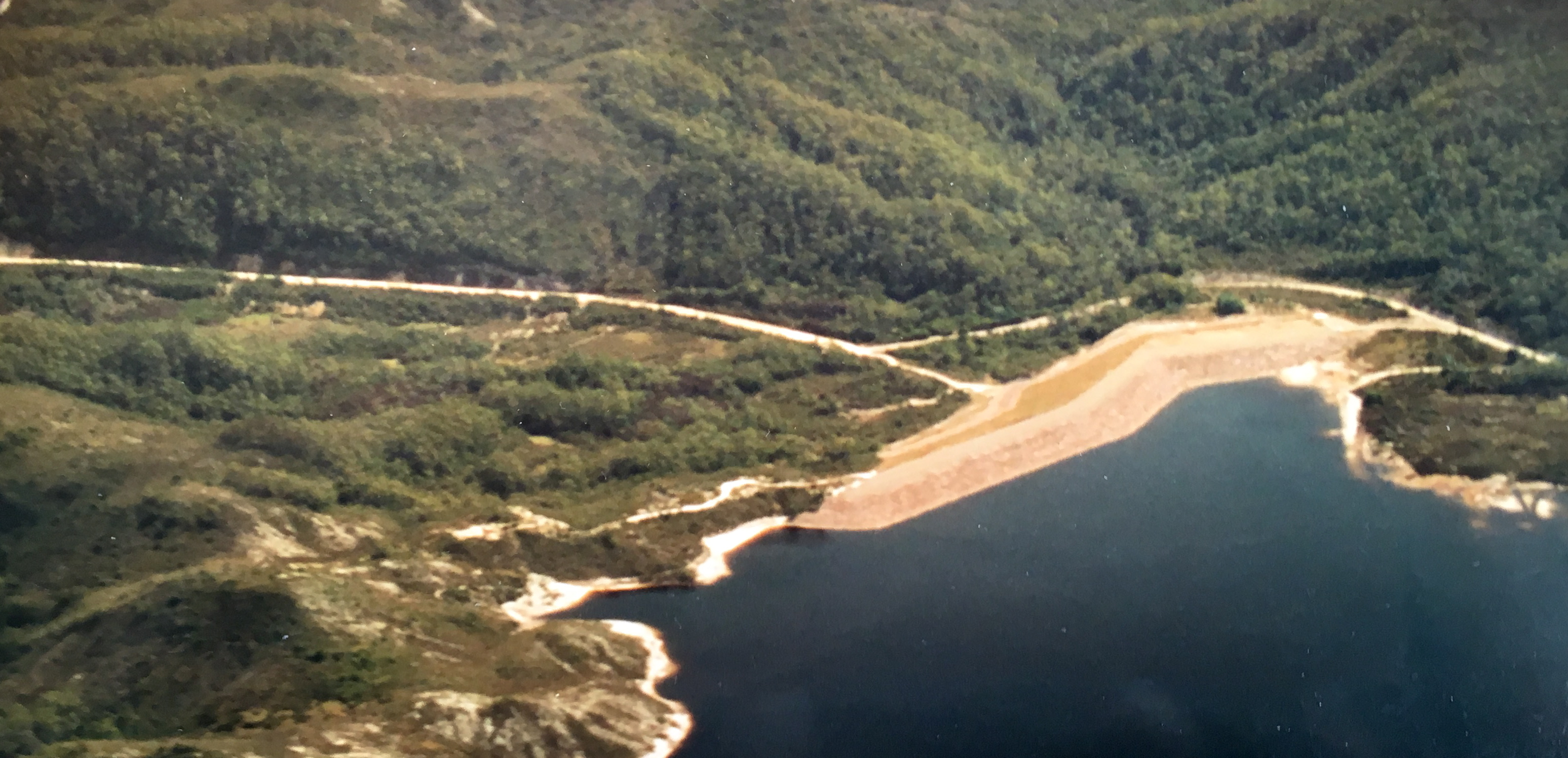
- An aerial view of the Darwin Dam, at the southern end of Lake Burbury

- Location of the dam in Tasmania
- Interactive map of Darwin Dam
- Country: Australia
- Location: West Coast Tasmania
- Coordinates: 42°13′06″S 145°37′09″E
- Purpose: Power
- Status: Operational
- Opening date: 1990
- Owner: Hydro Tasmania

Dam and spillways
- Type of dam: Rock-fill dam
- Impounds: off stream
- Height: 20 m (66 ft)
- Length: 700 m (2,300 ft)
- Dam volume: 430×10^{3} m^{3} (15×10^{6} cu ft)
- Spillways: 0

Reservoir
- Creates: Lake Burbury
- Total capacity: 1,081.42 GL (876,720 acre⋅ft)
- Active capacity: 1,065 GL (863,000 acre⋅ft)
- Catchment area: 559 km^{2} (216 sq mi)
- Surface area: 5,325 ha (13,160 acres)
- Normal elevation: 233 m (764 ft) AHD
- Website hydro.com.au

The Darwin Dam is an offstream earthfill embankment saddle dam, located in Western Tasmania, Australia. The impounded reservoir, formed by Crotty Dam and the Darwin Dam, is called Lake Burbury.

The dam was constructed in 1990 by the Hydro Electric Corporation (TAS) for the purpose of generating hydro-electric power via the John Butters Power Station. It had been known during construction as the Andrew Divide Dam.

== Features and location ==
The Darwin Dam, together with the Crotty Dam, are two major dams that form the headwaters for the King River Hydroelectric Power Development. The dam is located at the southern end of Lake Burbury and holds the water for the lake.

The Darwin Dam wall, constructed with 430 thousand cubic metres (15×10^{6} cu ft) of earth core, is 20 metres (66 ft) high and 700 metres (2,300 ft) long. When full, Lake Burbury has capacity of 1,081.42 gigalitres (876,720 acre⋅ft) and covers 53,250 hectares (131,600 acres), drawn from a catchment area of 559 square kilometres (216 sq mi). The dam wall does not have a spillway.

The dam draws its name from Mount Darwin, a peak located to the west of the dam wall. Both locations draw their names from the railway stopping place and the ghost town site of Darwin that was situated on the North Mount Lyell Railway between Gormanston and Kelly Basin. It inundates the former Kelly Basin Road which was the subsequent name for the railway line formation.

In the 1910s the Mount Lyell Mining and Railway Company investigated and surveyed a site very close to this dam for a proposed scheme.

== See also ==
- List of dams in Tasmania
