= Mount Huxley (Tasmania) =

Mountain in Western Tasmania, Australia

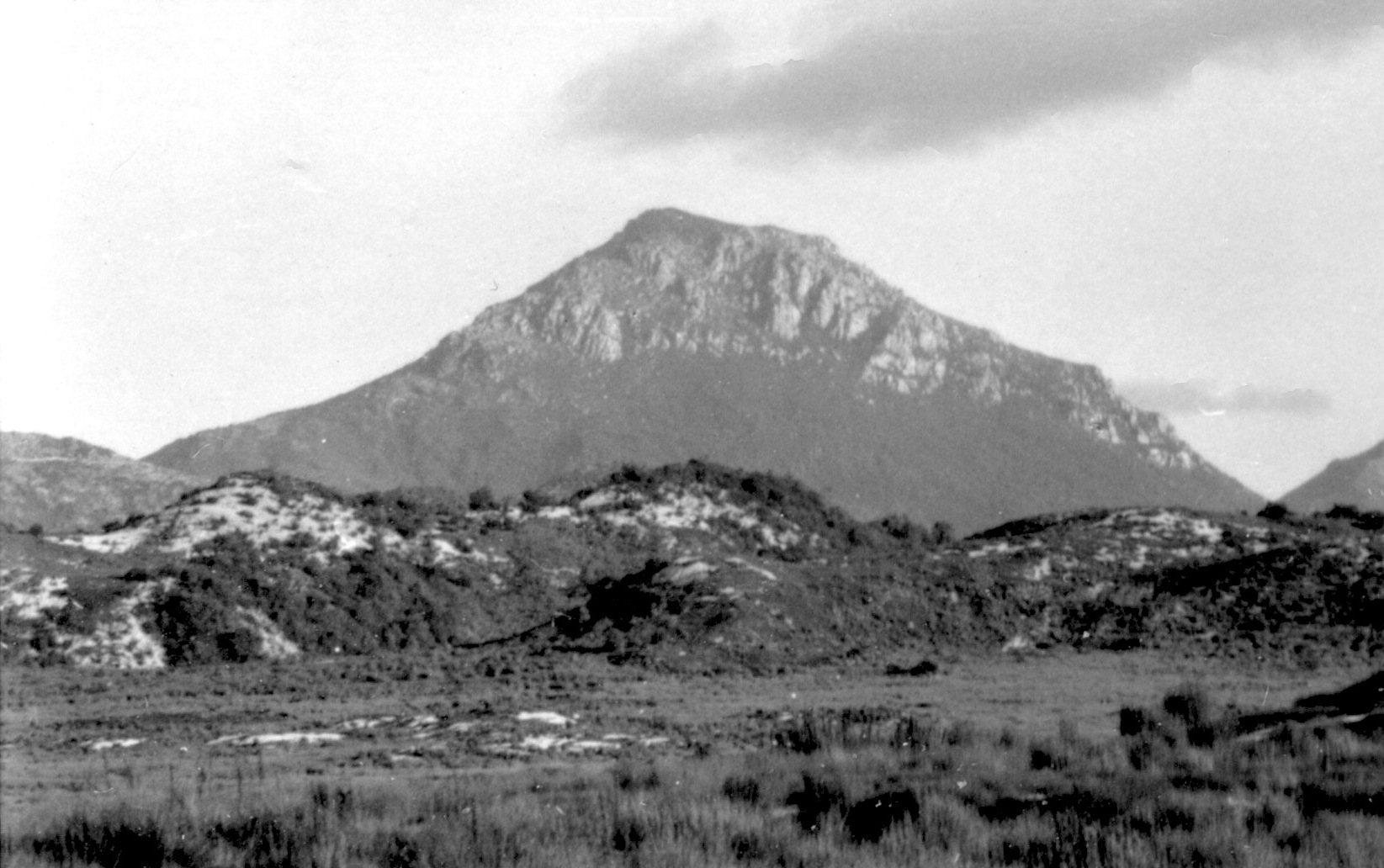
- Mount Huxley, taken from the Queenstown airport

Highest point
- Elevation: 926 m (3,038 ft)
- Coordinates: 42°08′24″S 145°35′24″E

Geography
- Location within Tasmania
- Location: West Coast, Tasmania, Australia
- Parent range: West Coast Range
- Topo map: Owen: 3833

Mount Huxley is a mountain located on the West Coast Range in the West Coast region of Tasmania, Australia. With an elevation of 926 metres (3,038 ft) above sea level, the mountain was named by Charles Gould in 1863 in honour of Professor Thomas Henry Huxley.

One of the smaller peaks in the West Coast Range, the mountain comprises a large 200-metre (660 ft) outcrop and rock face on its southern side above the King River Gorge just west of the Crotty Dam – parts of which are visible along the river gorge from the West Coast Wilderness Railway where it commences following the King River.

== Goldfield ==
Between April and June 1894 there was a goldfield situated on the slopes, and a syndicate that was discovered to have salted the mine site, with three alleged proponents, Isaac Bertram Barker, William Price and Antonio Briscoe, charged with fraud. On 1 July the Crown Solicitor told a magistrate that while the mine had undoubtedly been salted, there was insufficient evidence, and the charges were withdrawn.

== Location and access ==
The mountain is located north of the King River Gorge and Crotty Dam and north of Mount Jukes; west of the Tofft River, Thureau Hills, and Lake Burbury; south of Mount Owen and Queenstown.

A very rough track approaches the mountain from the north, and from the south Queenstown area. The southern side is sheer cliff into the King River Gorge.

== Gallery ==
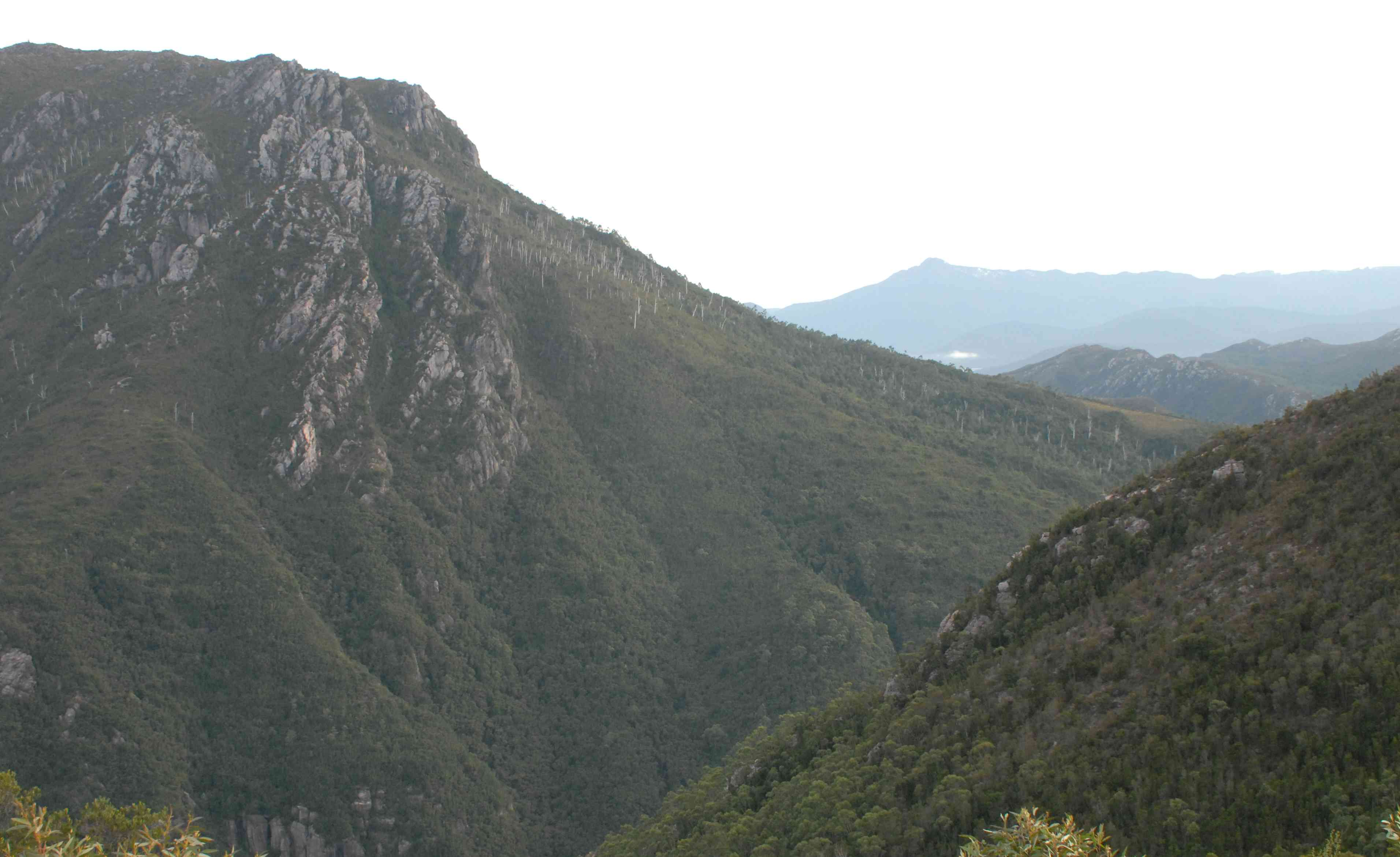
Mount Huxley showing rocky outcrop on the south face above the King River Gorge.

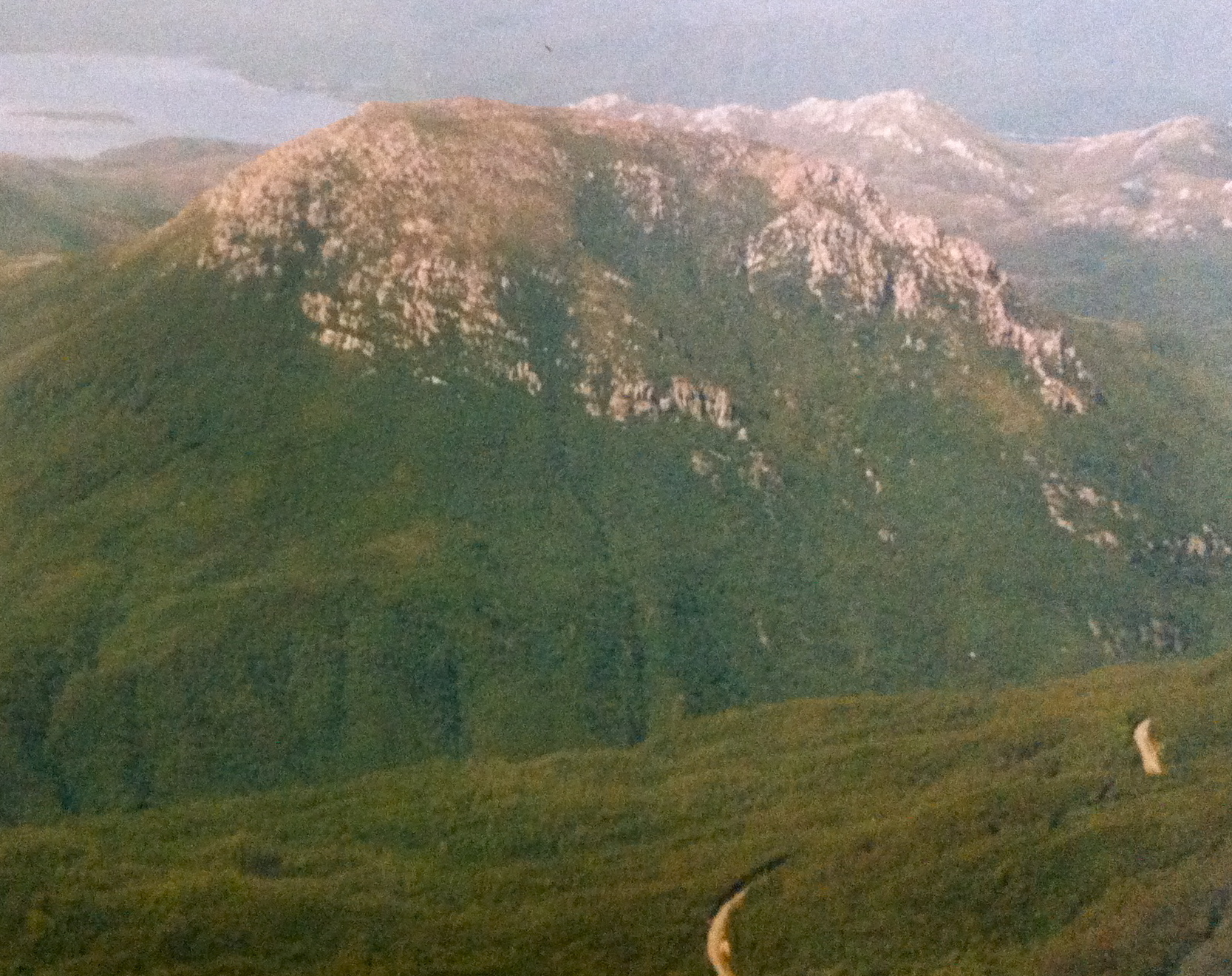
Mount Huxley from the air – from the southwest, and higher than picture at top.

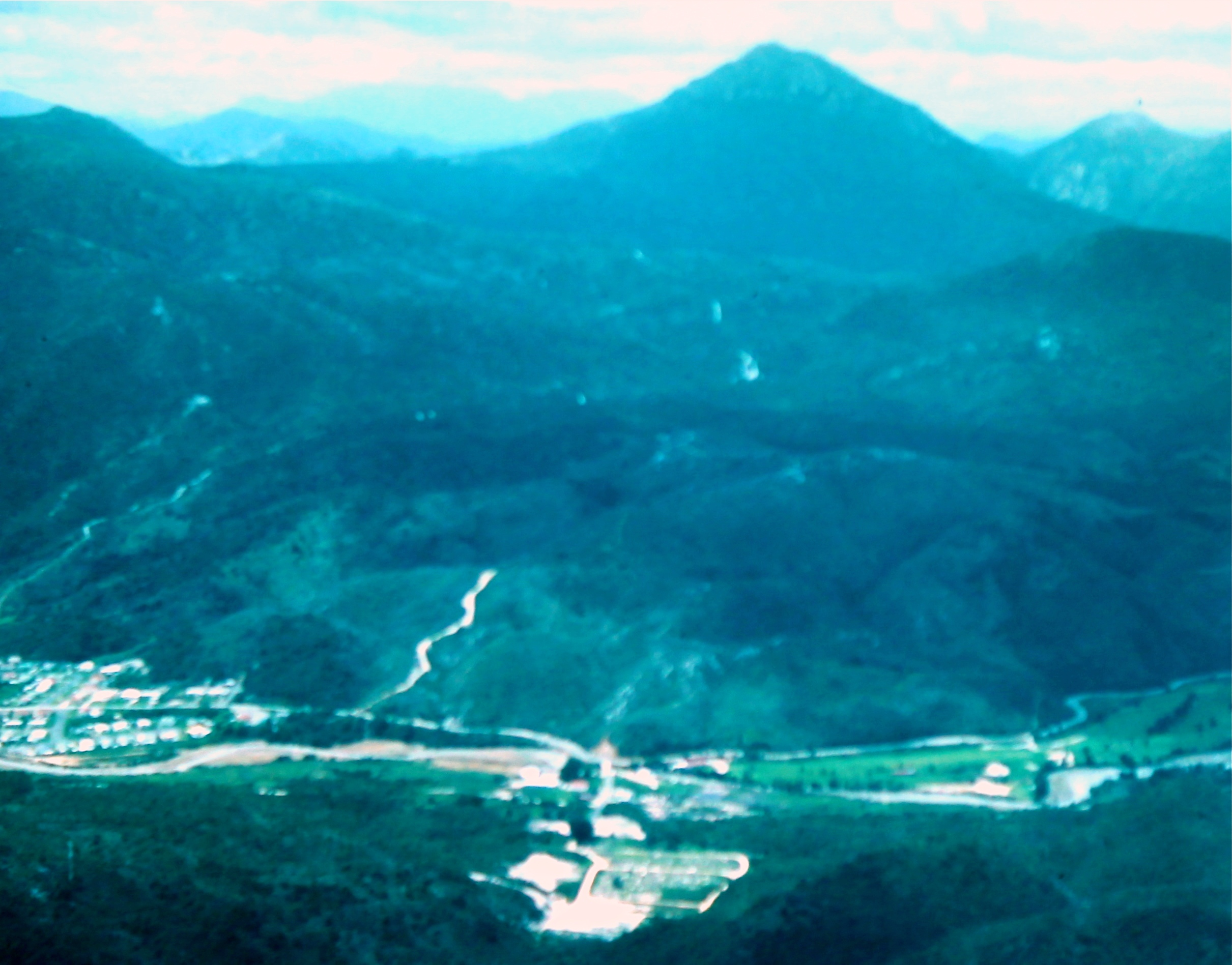
Mount Huxley from the air – from the west northwest from above the old Queenstown landing strip, circa 1975.

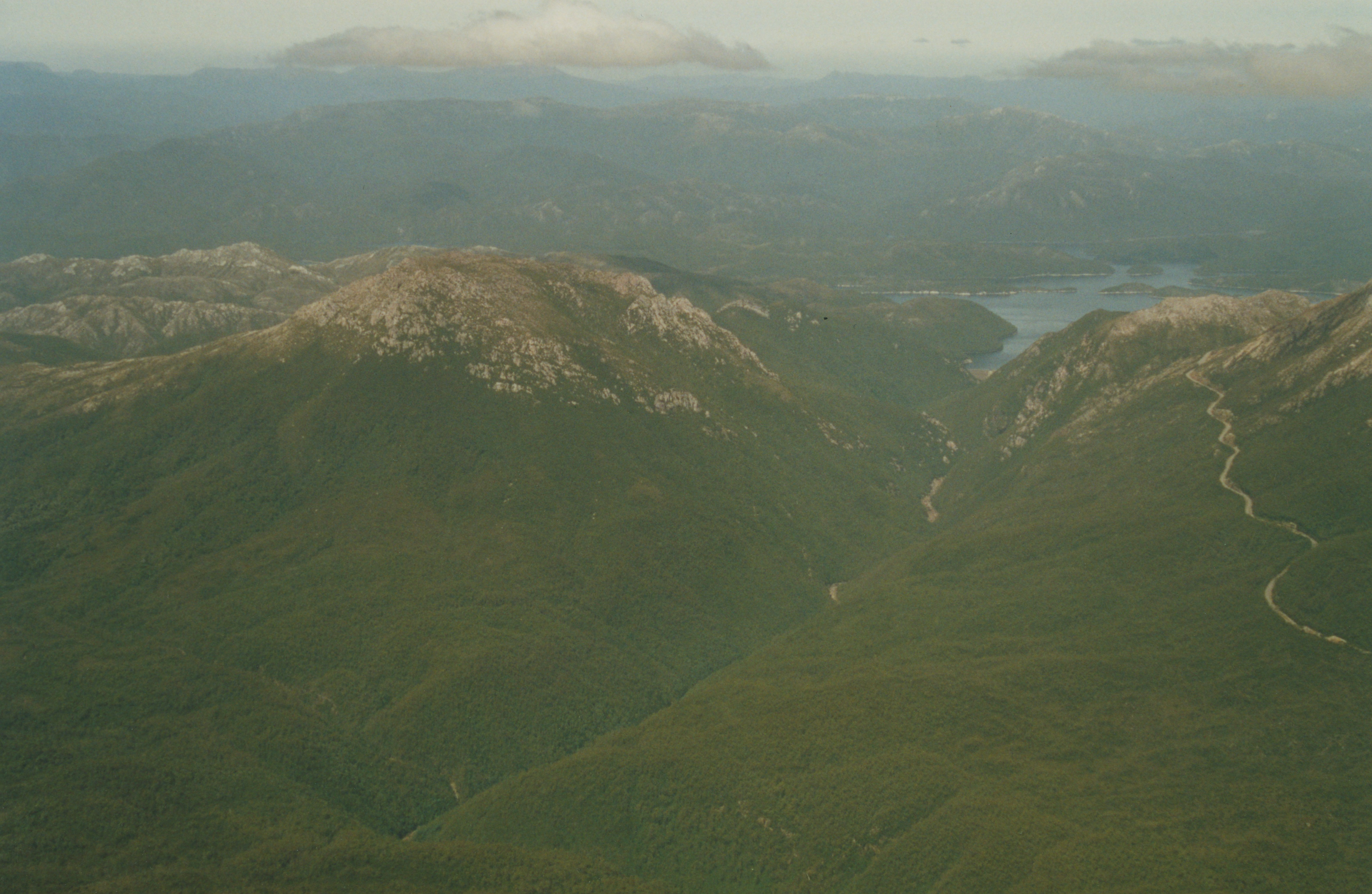
Mount Huxley from the air, at left, King River Gorge centre, Mount Jukes Highway to right, and Lake Burbury and the Crotty Dam at rear.

== See also ==
- List of highest mountains of Tasmania
