= Mount Darwin (Tasmania) =

Mountain in Tasmania, Australia

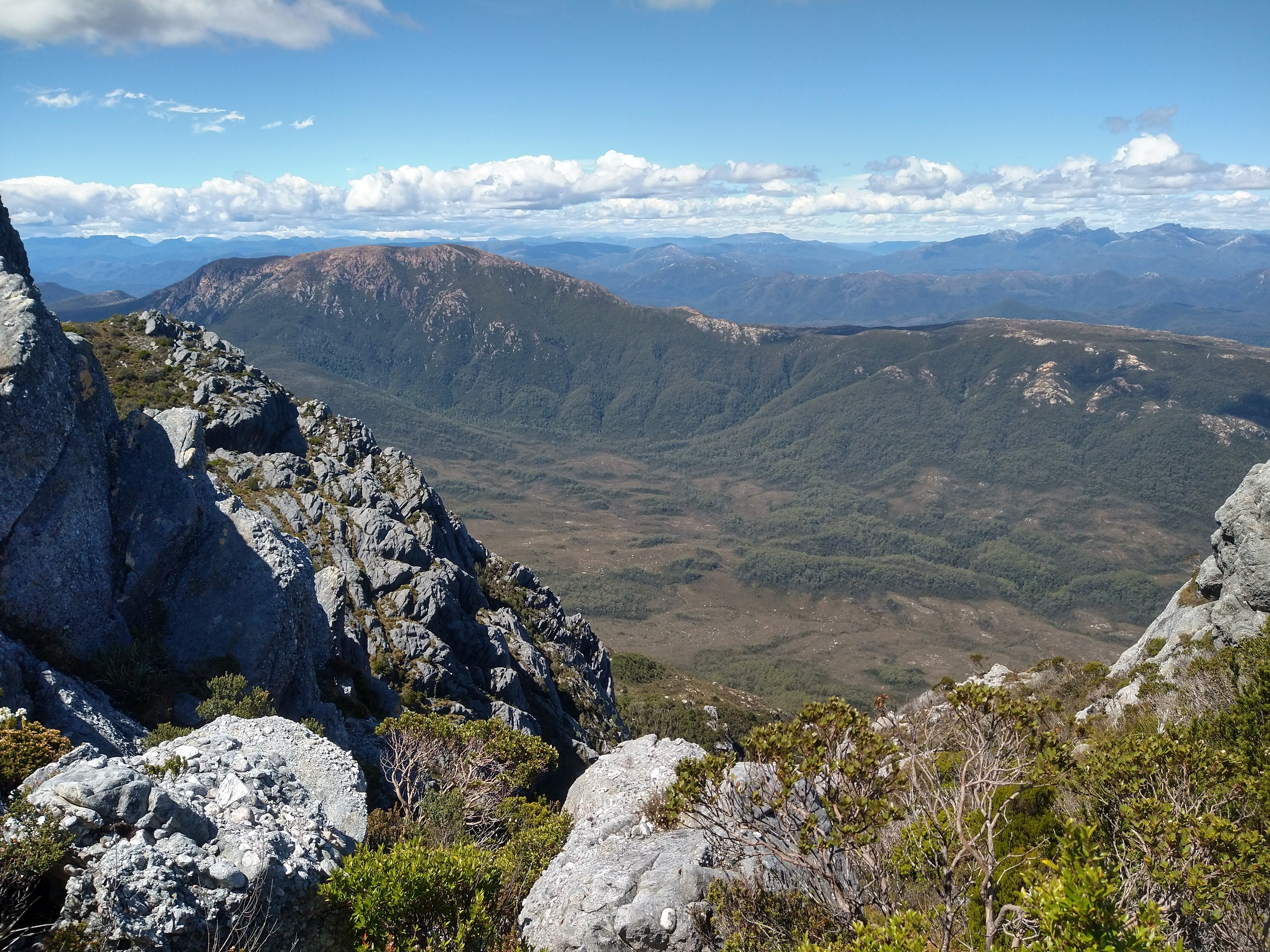
- Mount Darwin viewed from Mount Sorell in western Tasmania

Highest point
- Elevation: 1,033 m (3,389 ft)
- Coordinates: 42°15′00″S 145°35′48″E

Geography
- Location within Tasmania
- Location: Western Tasmania, Australia
- Parent range: West Coast Range

Geology
- Rock age: Jurassic

Mount Darwin is a mountain located in the West Coast region of Tasmania, Australia.

With an elevation of 1,033 metres (3,389 ft) above sea level, the mountain is situated on the West Coast Range. On the eastern side of the mountain is Darwin, a long-abandoned town site. Mount Darwin is the southernmost mountain of the West Coast range. Mount Jukes is north of the mountain while Mount Sorell is west of it.

The mountain is named in honour of Charles Darwin.

== Mine sites ==
Long abandoned short drives and shallow holes are found on Mount Darwin and are usually cited as being part of the Jukes-Darwin field.

== Features and access ==
The mountain has a plateau and has mining exploration tracks that lead to some of the older workings. It was possible in the 1970s to travel to the top of Mount Darwin in four wheel drive vehicles. The tracks also lead over towards the Clark River Valley which lies between Darwin and Mount Sorell to the west, and some tracks also were made on the ridge between Mount Darwin and the southern side of Mount Jukes.

Additional features located adjacent to the mountain includes a series of valleys and depressions called respectively the East Darwin Cirque, the South Darwin Cirque, and the Darwin Crater, a probable impact crater, lying 8.5 kilometres (5.3 mi) to the south-east of the mountain; the South Darwin Peak, a hill; and the Darwin Plateau.

== See also ==
- Darwin glass
- List of highest mountains of Tasmania
