= Mount Sorell =

Mountain in Western Tasmania, Australia

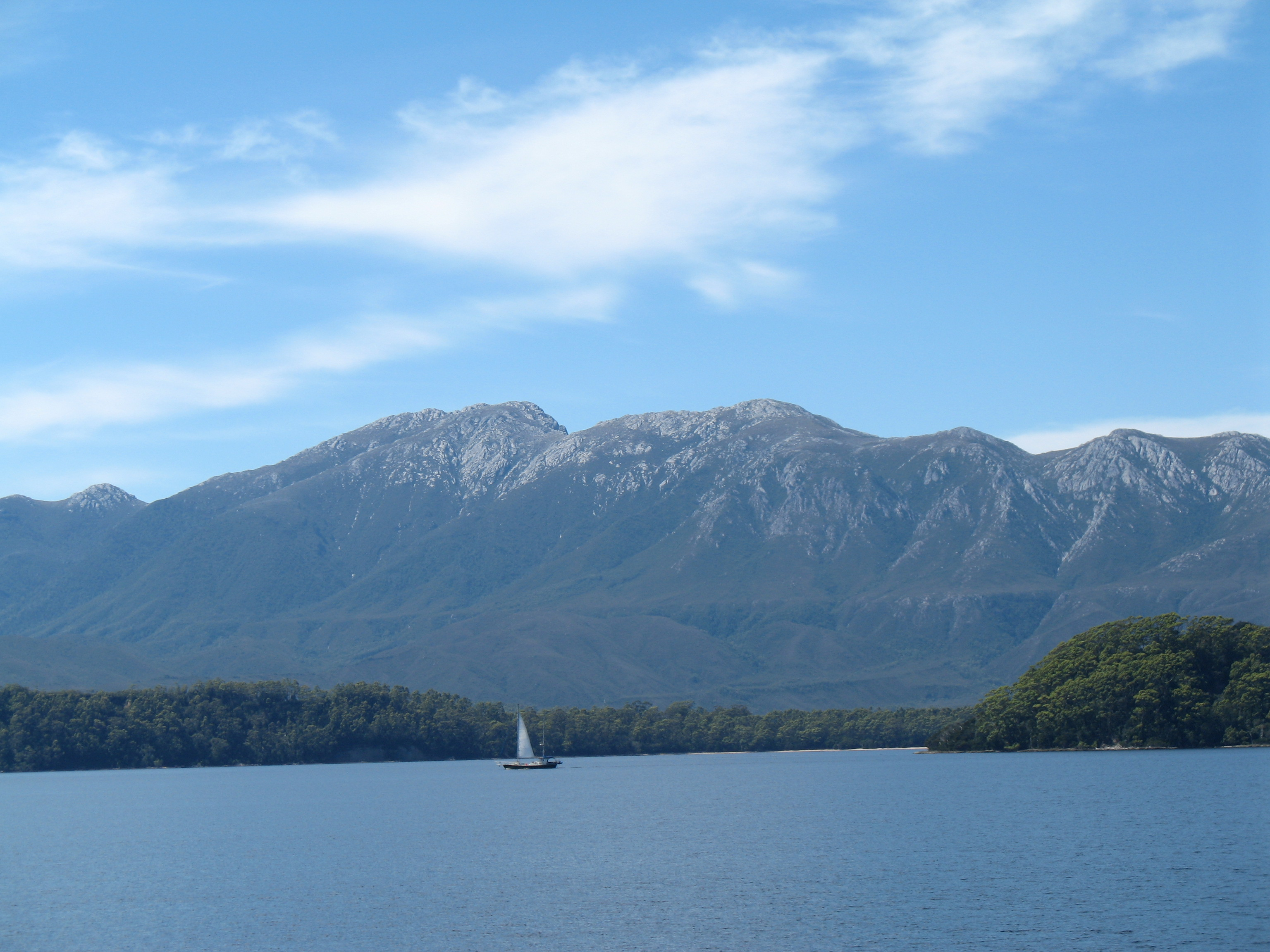
- Mount Sorell viewed from the Macquarie Harbour fjord

Highest point
- Elevation: 1,144 m (3,753 ft)
- Prominence: 673 m (2,208 ft)
- Isolation: 11.49 km (7.14 mi)
- Coordinates: 42°16′12″S 145°32′24″E

Geography
- Location within Tasmania
- Location: Western Tasmania, Australia
- Parent range: West Coast Range

Geology
- Rock age: Jurassic

Mount Sorell is a mountain located in the West Coast region of Tasmania, Australia.

With an elevation of 1,144 metres (3,753 ft) above sea level, the mountain is the most south westerly of all the peaks within the West Coast Range.

== History ==
The mountain was named in honour of William Sorell (1775 – 4 June 1848), a soldier who served as the third Lieutenant-Governor of Van Diemen's Land.

Alluvial gold was found in adjacent creeks in the 1880s.

== Geology ==
Its eastern face dominates the Clark River valley, which separates it from Mount Darwin.

Because of its position, its appearance and dominance over the Macquarie Harbour just north east of Sarah Island, it was an early named mountain, and no doubt one which gave a sense of barrier to convicts with dreams of escape. Some folklore passed from convict times claim leg irons or other items were found by troops looking for escaped convicts on its slopes.

It has no points of access like the nearby mountains, and in general remains relatively untouched compared to the West Coast Range mountains with old mine workings, walking track, and other signs of human activity.

The cape at the outer part of Hells Gates at the entrance to Macquarie Harbour is known as Cape Sorell, and there is a locality in south eastern Tasmania called Sorell.

== See also ==
- List of highest mountains of Tasmania
