= Charles Whitham =

Australian writer

Charles Whitham was an Australian writer. He wrote the oft-reprinted Western Tasmania: A land of Riches and Beauty, which was a comprehensive study of the geographical features of West Coast, Tasmania and the conditions of the region in the 1920s.

== Early life ==
Charles Whitham was born in India in 1873. He and his parents travelled to Tasmania in 1886.

His first book was published in 1917.

== Western Tasmania ==
The book was originally published in 1924 and reprinted in 1949 and in 1984. Extracts from the book were reproduced in The Mercury in the 1930s. The book is a mix of geographical and historical information about the west coast, and includes sections on Macquarie Harbour and the Mount Lyell Mining and Railway Company.

Whitham had personally travelled to many of the locations and features that he described as well as to most of the peaks of the West Coast Range. His photographs in the State Library of Tasmania attest to some of the places that he had visited.

It was not until the writing of Geoffrey Blainey's The Peaks of Lyell in the 1950s that the history and geography of the west coast of Tasmania was thoroughly reviewed and showed the important contribution of Whitham's earlier work.

A collection of articles by Whitham was collected by Kleinig in the 2000s.

== Later life and death ==
Whitham moved to Sydney in the 1920s, and died there in December 1940.
