= Limestone Coast Football Netball League =

Australian rules football competition

- Sport: Australian rules football
- Founded: 2023; 3 years ago
- First season: 2024
- No. of teams: 7
- Country: Australia
- Related competitions: SANFL
- Website: lcfnl.com.au

The Limestone Coast Football Netball League is an Australian rules football competition based in the Lower South East region of South Australia, and south-western border region of Victoria. It is an affiliated member of the South Australian National Football League. The league used to be regarded as the premier country football league in South Australia, and a leading country Victorian league, however the number of clubs and standard has declined in recent years.

== History ==
=== Western Border FL (1964–2023) ===
In 1964, after almost a decade of discussions, the Western District Football League in Victoria and the South-East & Border Football League in South Australia merged to form the Western Border Football League. The founding 12 clubs were Casterton, Coleraine, East Gambier, Hamilton, Hamilton Imperials, Heywood, Millicent, North Gambier, Penola, Portland, South Gambier and West Gambier.

Hamilton and Millicent both had jumpers similar to Collingwood's, so an agreement was made that the team that finished lower on the ladder for 1964 had to change jumpers. Hamilton finished ninth, while Millicent finished 11th of 12, so Millicent was forced to change to the St Kilda strip.

Penola left and joined the Kowree Naracoorte Football League in 1988; Coleraine left and joined the South West District Football League in 1995.

In 2011, the Heywood Football Club left the Western Border Football League due to the club struggling to compete with the larger town clubs in the league. Their first application to leave was rejected, so they were forced to go to higher levels at the VCFL to resolve issues between the League and the Heywood Football Netball Club.

In 2012, the Hamilton and Hamilton Imperials club merged upon recommendation from the VCFL and competed in the Hampden Football Netball League from 2013. Portland also transferred to the Hampden Football Netball League for 2013, leaving just 6 teams in the competition today. Casterton merged with neighbouring club Sandford (from the South West District Football League) in 2014.

When the VFL had zoning from 1968 to 1986, the league was allocated to Collingwood.

Some famous players that have played in the Western Border Football League have been Billy Picken, Matthew Clarke, Nick Daffy, Nathan Lovett-Murray, Mal Michael, John Mossop, Wally Lovett, and Brad Close.

=== Limestone Coast FNL (2024–) ===
In late 2023, it was announced that the WBFL would be wound up and replaced by the Limestone Coast Football Netball League for the 2024 season. It was also announced that for the 2025 season, one club each from the Kowree Naracoorte Tatiara Football League and the Mid South Eastern Football League would transfer to the competition. Penola joined the LCFNL from the KNTFL prior to the 2025 season, however no Mid South Eastern club made the move over.

== Clubs ==
=== Locations ===
Club locations - Mount Gambier	Club locations - Limestone Coast

==== Current clubs ====
Club	Colours	Nickname	Home Ground	Former League	Est.	Years in LCFNL	LCFNL Senior Premierships	
Club	Colours	Nickname	Home Ground	Former League	Est.	Years in LCFNL	Total	Years
Casterton-Sandford		Cats	Island Park, Casterton	WBFL	2014	2024–	0	–
East Gambier		Bulldogs	McDonald Park, Mount Gambier	WBFL	1934	2024–	0	–
Millicent		Saints	McLaughlin Park, Millicent	WBFL	1906	2024–	1	2025
North Gambier		Tigers	Vansittart Park, Mount Gambier	WBFL	1926	2024–	0	–
Penola		Eagles	McCorquindale Park, Penola	KNTFL	1865	2025–	0	–
South Gambier		Demons	Blue Lake Sports Park, Mount Gambier	WBFL	1926	2024–	1	2026
West Gambier		Roos	Malseed Park, Mount Gambier	WBFL	1938	2024–	1	2024

=== Western Border FL (1964–2023) ===
==== Final clubs ====
Club	Colours	Nickname	Home Ground	Former League	Est.	Years in WBFL	WBFL Senior Premierships	
Club	Colours	Nickname	Home Ground	Former League	Est.	Years in WBFL	Total	Years
Casterton-Sandford		Cats	Island Park, Casterton	–	2014	2014–2023	0	–
East Gambier		Bulldogs	McDonald Park, Mount Gambier	SE&BFL	1934	1964–2023	9	1965, 1972, 1973, 1975, 1976, 1982, 1983, 1988, 2017
Millicent	(1964-?)(?-2023)	Saints	McLaughlin Park, Millicent	SE&BFL	1906	1964–2023	5	1984, 2018, 2021, 2022, 2023
North Gambier		Tigers	Vansittart Park, Mount Gambier	SE&BFL	1926	1964–2023	9	1964, 1979, 1987, 1989, 2012, 2013, 2014, 2016, 2019
South Gambier	(1964-80s, 2010s-23)(1980s-99)(2000-10s)	Demons	Blue Lake Sports Park, Mount Gambier	SE&BFL	1926	1964–2023	12	1974, 1992, 1994, 1996, 1997, 1998, 1999, 2000, 2002, 2005, 2009, 2015
West Gambier	(1964-?) (?-2023)	Roos	Malseed Park, Mount Gambier	SE&BFL	1938	1964–2023	3	1971, 2010, 2011

==== Former clubs ====
Club	Colours	Nickname	Home Ground	Former League	Est.	Years in WBFL	WBFL Senior Premierships		Fate
Club	Colours	Nickname	Home Ground	Former League	Est.	Years in WBFL	Total	Years	Fate
Casterton		Cats	Island Park, Casterton	WDFL	1920s	1964–2013	2	1969, 1990	Merged with Sandford to form Casterton-Sandford in 2014
Coleraine		Maroons	Silvester Oval, Coleraine	WDFL	1900s	1964–1994	1	1967	Transferred to the South West District FL in 1995
Hamilton		Magpies	Melville Oval, Hamilton	WDFL	1874	1964–2012	4	1968, 1970, 1981, 2004	Merged with Hamilton Imperials to form Hamilton Kangaroos in the Hampden FL in 2013
Hamilton Imperials		Bulldogs	Melville Oval, Hamilton	WDFL	1948	1964–2012	6	1977, 1978, 1980, 1993, 1995, 2001	Merged with Hamilton to form Hamilton Kangaroos in the Hampden FL in 2013
Heywood	(1960s)(1980s)(?-2011)	Lions	Heywood Recreation Reserve, Heywood	WDFL	c.1921	1964–2011	0	-	Transferred to the South West District FL in 2012
Penola		Eagles	McCorquindale Park, Penola	SE&BFL	1865	1964–1987	0	-	Transferred to the Kowree Naracoorte FL in 1988
Portland		Tigers	Hanlon Park, Portland	WDFL	1876	1964–2012	8	1966, 1985, 1986, 1991, 2003, 2006, 2007, 2008	Transferred to the Hampden FL in 2013

== League awards ==
=== Western Border FL (1964–2023) ===
Season	Best & Fairest	Club	Leading Goalkicker	Club	Goals
1964	G Hariott	Coleraine	Kevin Malseed	Heywood	75
1965	Kevin Malseed	Heywood	M Graham	Penola	74
1966	J McBain	Penola	R Duncan	Heywood	54
1967	David Robbie	Casterton	B Norman	South Gambier	75
1968	G Cayzer	Hamilton	L Dethmore	South Gambier	68
1969	G Cayzer	Hamilton	H Graham	Penola	91
1970	Michael Graham	Penola	R Harvey	Casterton	83
1971	B Smith	South Gambier	B Norman	South Gambier	76
1972	Gary Lazarus	East Gambier	Gary Lazarus	East Gambier	64
1973	D Clarke	East Gambier	G Sims	South Gambier	67
1974	Kevin Douglas	West Gambier	Des Trotter	East Gambier	117
1975	S McKew	Hamilton Imperial	Des Trotter	East Gambier	122
1976	M Whitington	Millicent	M Soulsby	Hamilton	80
1977	Greg Curnow	North Gambier	D. Maczkowiack	West Gambier	81
1978	P Cranage	Hamilton	W. Chapman	West Gambier	88
	M Horsborugh	Coleraine			
1979	G Richards	Hamilton Imperial	S. Skeer	Penola	98
1980	J Beaton	West Gambier	Tony Russell	Hamilton	101
1981	I McGuiness	Heywood	Neville Osborne	Hamilton Imperial	84
1982	G Reichman	Hamilton Imperial	R. Lawson	East Gambier	136
1983	M Gregg	Casterton	D. Maczkowiack	West Gambier	76
1984	Wayne Fletcher	North Gambier	N. Carracher	Hamilton Imperial	106
1985	L King	Portland	Michael Timms	South Gambier	100
1986	L Bell	South Gambier	Michael Timms	South Gambier	113
1987	Darren Wright	North Gambier	Trevor Russell	Hamilton	131
1988	Andrew Close	West Gambier	Trevor Russell	Hamilton	89
1989	Tony Lithgow	Casterton	Tony Otter	Portland	104
1990	D Lane	East Gambier	P. Harrison	Millicent	65
1991	G Stevens	Hamilton	D. Pannenburg	East Gambier	112
1992	R Elliott	South Gambier	L. Hampshire	Portland	87
1993	M Jones	East Gambier	Tim Williamson	Casterton	82
1994	Michael Edmonds	Hamilton Imperial	D. Pannenburg	East Gambier	100
1995	D Jenkinson	Heywood	A. Salmon	South Gambier	73
1996	Mick Ryan	South Gambier	M. Lane	North Gambier	59
1997	Andrew Nitschke	Millicent	Leigh Capewell	South Gambier	65
	Barry Knight	Portland			
1998	Wayne Riddle	Hamilton	Leigh Capewell	South Gambier	101
1999	Brad Cooper	Hamilton Imperial	G. Goss	North Gambier	100
2000	Matthew Steel	Portland	P. Harten	South Gambier	74
2001	Andrew Nitschke	Millicent	K. Cook	East Gambier	54
2002	Scott Flett	North Gambier	Michael Silvy	North Gambier	89
	Justin Munro	Casterton			
2003	Andrew Nitschke	Millicent	Leigh Capewell	South Gambier	59
	Winis Imbi	Portland			
2004	Brent Howard	South Gambier	B. Edwards	Portland	59
2005	Scott Flett	North Gambier	Grant Ewing	Hamilton Imperial	73
2006	Jon Copping	South Gambier	Ryan Larcombe	East Gambier	81
2007	James Imbi	Portland	Grant Ewing	Hamilton Imperial	94
2008	Marcus England	Portland	Grant Ewing	Hamilton Imperial	69
2009	Marcus England	Portland	C.Murray	Millicent	83
2010	Justin McConnell	North Gambier	Courtney Johns	Heywood	78
2011	Simon Berkefeld	South Gambier	Justin McConnell	North Gambier	85
	Brad Vassal	Casterton			
2012	Richard O'Grady	North Gambier	Jarrod Holt	Portland	65
2013	Brad Wilson	West Gambier	Justin McConnell	North Gambier	70
2014	Richard O'Grady	North Gambier	Justin McConnell	North Gambier	74
	Dylan Ayton	Casterton-Sandford			
2015			Justin McConnell	North Gambier	100
2016			Nick Moretti	North Gambier	50
2017	Brett O'Neil	South Gambier	Tom McLennan	North Gambier	46
2018	Tom Hutchesson	Millicent	Brayden Kaine	South Gambier	51
2019	Michael Telford	North Gambier	Justin McConnell	North Gambier	46
2021	Clint Gallio	Millicent	Gene Robinson	Millicent	103
2022	Jayden Eldridge	East Gambier	Brayden Kain	South Gambier	59
2023	Daron McElroy	West Gambier	Frazer Bradley	Millicent	41

=== Limestone Coast FL (1964–2023) ===
Season	Best & Fairest	Club	Leading Goalkicker	Club	Goals
2024	Harry Tunkin	Millicent	Frazer Bradley	Millicent	59
2024	Emerson Mark	South Gambier	Frazer Bradley	Millicent	59
2025			Brodie Foster	Penola	45

== Notable players ==
=== Western Border FL (1964–2023) ===
- John Gill, Barry Gill, Max Rooke, Alan Richardson, Russell Johnston, Don Whitten, Laurie Nash, Reg Burgess, David Robbie – Casterton Sandford
- Brian Gray, Les Kaine, John Vickery, Eric Moore, Barry McKenzie, Michael Horsburgh – Coleraine
- Gary Lazarus, Simon Feast, Stephen Jankowicz – East Gambier
- Phil Walsh, Alan Atkinson, Paul Cranage, Tony Russell, Shannon Watt, Adam Campbell, Marcus Picken, Liam Picken – Hamilton
- Ian Ridley, John McMillan, Michael Edmonds, Mark Orval, Josh Thurgood – Hamilton Imperials
- Denis Zeunert, Billy Picken, Wally Lovett, Justin Perkins, Nathan Lovett-Murray, Mal Michael, Courtney Johns, Justin Perkins – Heywood
- Bob Clifford, Brian Roberts, Neil Sutherland, Mason Redman, Richard Nixon Andrew Nitschke, Triple League medalist – Millicent
- Nick Daffy, Dwaine Kretschmer, Glen Keast, Lucas Herbert, Nathan Stark, Brad Close – North Gambier
- John Mossop, Michael Graham, Colin Graham – Penola
- Stuart Spencer, Clyde Laidlaw, Peter Hogan, Leo King, Wayne Blackwell, Ian Hampshire, Winis Imbi, Brodie Atkinson – Portland
- Max James, Doug Long, Robin McKinnon, Oscar Adams – South Gambier
- John Yeates, Mark Yeates, Jason Walscgott, Tim O'Brien, Matthew Clarke, Robin White – West Gambier

== Bibliography ==
- Encyclopedia of South Australian country football clubs compiled by Peter Lines. ISBN 9780980447293
- South Australian country football digest by Peter Lines ISBN 9780987159199
