= Portland Football Netball Cricket Club =

Australian sports club based in Portland, Victoria

Portland

Names
- Full name: Portland Football Netball Cricket Club
- Nickname(s): Tigers

Club details
- Founded: 1876; 149 years ago
- Colours
- Competition: Hampden FNL
- Premierships: (18) 1906, 1907, 1909, 1912, 1914, 1922, 1924, 1929, 1952, 1956, 1966, 1985, 1986, 1991, 2003, 2006, 2007, 2008
- Ground(s): Hanlon Park

Uniforms
Home

The Portland Football Netball Cricket Club, nicknamed the Tigers, is an Australian sports club based in the city of Portland, Victoria. The club's football and netball teams currently compete in the Hampden Football Netball League, with the football squad having joined it in 2013 along with the Hamilton Kangaroos.

Apart from football and netball, the club has a cricket section which up until 2023 played in the Portland and District Cricket Association. That association amalgamated with the Hamilton and District Cricket Association ahead of the 2023-24 season.

== History ==
The club was established as "Portland Football Club" on 6 June 1876 at a meeting held at Mac's Hotel. Portland's current colours (black and gold) were first used in 1902 and again in 1909, but changed in 1919. The distinctive black with gold sash came into being in 1930.

Hanlon Park became Portland's home ground in 1923 and has remained as such, except for 1961 when Henty Park was used while Hanlon Park was top dressed. Before 1923, football was played from 1866 on the cricket ground the North Cliff.

In 1931 the club joined the Western District FL after previously playing in a local competition that had local clubs nearby. The development of the automobile allowed the team to travel greater distances and play against larger towns. The club soon developed a rivalry against Hamilton, Coleraine and Casterton.

The Western Border Football League (an amalgamation of the Western District Football League and the South Eastern Border Football League) was formed in 1964.

At the Annual General Meeting of the Club held on 16 February 1994, the name of the club was changed to the Portland Football-Netball Club and became incorporated under that name on 29 March 1994.

Subsequent to this, the name of the Club changed to its present title, namely the Portland Football Netball Cricket Club at a Special General Meeting on 9 March 2006.

In 2013 Portland opted to transfer to the Hampden Football Netball League. This move came when the Hamilton and Imperials clubs decided to merge and also desired to transfer to the Hampden FNL.

== Premierships ==
- South West District Association 1913-1924
  - 1914, 1922, 1924
- Glenelg Football Association 1925-1930
  - 1925
- Western District FL 1931-1963
  - 1952, 1956
- Western Border FL 1964-2012
  - 1966, 1985, 1986, 1991, 2003, 2006, 2007, 2008
- Hampden Football Netball League 2013-
  - Nil

== Leading goalkickers ==
•John Phillips 1982 (104)

•Tim Otter 1989 (108)

•Luke Hampshire 1992 (87)

•Jarrod Holt 2012 (71)

•Jay Moody 2015 (52)

•James Roberts 2016 (50)

•James Roberts 2017 (60)

•Thomas Sharp 2022 (82)

== Most Senior Games ==
Mick Jennings holds the record of 323 games.( Mick also played another 21 games with Heywood )

== Most goals in a season ==
Tim Otter with 109 in 1989. He is one of two 100 goal players, the other being John Phillips.

== Most goals in a game ==
16 by Bill Mahon in the Second Semi Final on 22 September 1956( against Imperials ).

== Highest ever score ==
Portland 44.23.287 def. Hamilton 3.6.24 on 8 April 2000.

== VFL/AFL players ==
- Alan Byron - Geelong
- Ian Hampshire - Geelong, Western Bulldogs
- Peter Hogan - St Kilda, Collingwood
- Kevin Huppatz - Collingwood
- Clyde Laidlaw - Melbourne
- Stuart Spencer - Melbourne
- Rowan Marshall - St. Kilda
- Jamaine Jones - Geelong/West Coast
- Terry Domburg - Collingwood
- Willam Cables - Collingwood
- Jeremy Duncan - St. Kilda
- Harris Jennings - Geelong
- Jamieson Ballantyne - Footscray
- Keegan Gray - Werribee
- Tanner Lovell - Geelong

== Bibliography ==
- Evergreen Hampden: The Hampden Football League and its people, 1930-1976 by Fred Bond & Don Grossman, 1979 – ISBN 0868251089
- History of Football in the Western District by John Stoward – Aussie Footy Books, 2008 – ISBN 9780957751590
