= David Robbie =

David Robbie may refer to:

- David Robbie (Fijian politician) (1849–1940), businessman and politician in colonial Fiji
- David Robbie (Scottish footballer) (1899–1978)
- David Robbie (Australian footballer) (born 1944), Australian rules footballer
