= Casterton-Sandford Football Club =

Casterton-Sandford

Names
- Full name: Casterton-Sandford Football Netball Club Inc
- Nickname(s): Cats

Club details
- Founded: 2013; 12 years ago
- Colours
- Competition: Limestone Coast FNL
- Ground(s): Island Park

Uniforms
Home

The Casterton-Sandford Football Netball Club, nicknamed the Cats, is an Australian rules football and netball club based in the town of Casterton, Victoria. Founded in 2013, it is the only club in Victoria that fields teams in the South Australian Limestone Coast Football Netball League. The club also fields a women's football team in the Limestone Coast Women's Football League.

The club was formed from a merger of the Casterton and Sandford football clubs, amalgamating both clubs' colours while retaining Casterton's 'Cats' nickname, hooped guernsey, and Island Park home ground.

== History ==
The merged club was formed in 2013 from the Casterton Football Netball Club of South Australia's Western Border Football League and the Sandford Football Netball Club of Victoria's South West District Football League. As of 2024, the merged entity has yet to win a men's senior football premiership.

In 2022, Casterton-Sandford applied with the South Australian Football Commission to leave the Western Border Football League and join the Mid South Eastern league. The commission rejected the application, opting to examine and consider restructuring the leagues in the state's south-east.
