= David Michel (disambiguation) =

David Michel may refer to:

- David Michel (c.1735–1805), British member of parliament
- David Michel (American politician) (born 1974), Member of Connecticut House of Representatives
- David Michel (screenwriter) of Around the World in 80 Days (2021 film)

== See also ==
- David Mitchell (disambiguation)
- David Michels, British businessman
