= Mark Orval =

Australian online personality and former footballer

- Born: 19 March 1968 (age 58); Hamilton, Victoria, Australia
- Other name: Angry Dad
- Spouse: Sharon Orval
- Children: 3

YouTube information
- Channel: Angry Dad
- Years active: 2015-present
- Subscribers: 252,000
- Views: 78.8M
Australian rules football career
Personal information
- Original team: Hamilton Imperials
- Debut: Collingwood vs. Hawks, at Victoria Park, Melbourne
- Height: 188 cm (6 ft 2 in)
- Weight: 105 kg (231 lb)
- Position: Key forward
Playing career^{1}
Years	Club	Games (Goals)
1987–88	Collingwood	7 (7)
- ^{1} Playing statistics correct to the end of 1988.

Mark Orval (born 19 March 1968), also known as Angry Dad, is an Australian social media personality and former Australian rules footballer who played with Collingwood in the Victorian Football League (VFL). An injury to his foot, which caused a stress fracture to his navicular, led to his retirement from the sport in 1991. In his later life, Orval became an internet celebrity after his two sons, Dylan and Mitchell, uploaded short videos of them playing pranks on him. These videos received millions of views on social media platforms.

== Personal life ==
Growing up in Hamilton, Victoria, Orval lived with his parents who both worked. They supported the Hamilton Imperials Football Club, which they would attend each weekend. During his twenties, Orval lived across the road from Mick Nunan, and they would practice football on the road when Nunan returned home from work. A connection to Jimmy Jess allowed Orval to become recognised through scouting.

Orval lives with his wife Sharon and his daughter Hannah and two sons Mitchell and Dylan. Dylan was selected by the Adelaide FC in the 2012 Rookie Draft. Orval was diagnosed with prostate cancer on his 53rd birthday, after receiving a blood test, however made a full recovery, after undergoing an radical prostatectomy. Orval is a grandfather to his son Mitchell and partner, Chloe Szepanowski's son, Sunny.

In 2020, a documentary about Orval's life called "F@#k Off Mitchell! The Angry Dad Story" was released. The documentary, starring Orval and his family, covered his personal life, YouTube career and injuries he received during his sports career.

== AFL career ==
A Hamilton Imperials recruit who hoped to play in renascence under Leigh Matthews, Orval was chosen for Collingwood by Paul Cranage. During a game of casual soccer, Orval was tackled by Bruce Abernethy, injuring his toe. Despite his injury, Orval appeared for the team in six of the last seven rounds of the 1987 VFL season, debuting in a 125-point-loss to Hawthorn Football Club at Victoria Park, Melbourne. Orval was given a jumper change during the preseason of 1987, having worn No.54 in reserve, he was then given No.10. He missed one game through suspension, for striking Jim Stynes, then returned, being chosen by Matthews over Coleman Medal winner Brian Taylor, against Essendon at the MCG in the final round, going on to kick four goals, along with Peter Daicos and Craig Starcevich.

Matthews was impressed by Orval's performance at the end of the 1987 season. Orval had suffered with continuous stress fractures to his navicular, which had affected his ability to participate in matches throughout the 1986 and 1987 seasons. Multiple surgeries involved pinning, however the aching returned each time. Orval participated in two reserve games during 1988, and was recalled for the final match of the VFL season, on the one year anniversary of his four-goal match against Essendon. In the final match against the Cats, Orval kicked a goal, injuring his foot in the process. Continuing with surgeries, nine in total, Orval attempted to remain in the sport, with Matthews planning on playing him in 1990. He was delisted in 1991 however, ending his AFL career permanently. As a result of his injury, Orval was diagnosed with clinical depression and anger management problems, and subsequently sought treatment.

After his retirement, Orval became a board member of Collingwood's Past Player Association, becoming a mentor to James Hird, who suffered similar issues with his navicular.

== YouTube career ==
Orval family members had historically pranked their senior family members, Orval having pranked his own father when he was younger. Orval's sons Dylan and Mitchell began videoing him when they pulled pranks on him, uploading and sharing these videos with friends on Facebook with the hashtag "#AngryDad". It was suggested to them by friends to start a Facebook page, so that the videos could be distributed beyond friend groups. Mitchell Orval was inspired by The Simpsons episode "I Am Furious (Yellow)", where Bart Simpson creates a character called "Angry Dad" based on his father, Homer. Orval became an unwilling viral internet celebrity under this moniker and since 2015 the YouTube channel has progressed into a series of prank videos showing his short temper filmed by his two sons.

His sons, Dylan and Mitchell, collaborated with KIIS FM and The Kyle & Jackie O Show for video content ideas and production efforts, also working with Orval to prank his sons in return. Due to the YouTube channel videos containing profanity, the platform disabled monetisation, meaning neither Orval or his two sons ever earned money from ad revenue. After a year of uploading, they began earning revenue. A planned collaboration with Bam Margera in Geelong fell through after Margera caused damage to a hotel. In 2018, an phone application called Banta was developed and released by Dylan and Mitchell, functioning as an instant messaging platform with a "randomiser" feature that can randomly select a person to perform a task from a preselected group.

== Television ==
Year	Title	Role
2017	Dot Com Social	Himself
2018	The Platform	Himself
2020	F@#k Off Mitchell! The Angry Dad Story	Himself
