= Neil Sutherland =

Neil Sutherland may refer to:

- Neil Sutherland (footballer)
- Neil Sutherland (composer)
- Neil Sutherland (The Inbetweeners)
