= Michael Edmonds =

Michael Edmonds may refer to:

- Michael Edmonds (footballer), Australian rules footballer
- Michael Edmonds (artist), British artist and architect
- Mike Edmonds, English actor
- Mike Edmonds (educator), American academic administrator

== See also ==
- Mike Edmunds, British astrophysicist
