= South West District Football League =

Australian rules football competition

- Founded: 1970

The South West District Football League is an Australian rules football league based in South-western Victoria, with clubs located in the vicinity of Hamilton, Heywood and Portland. The league is a minor country league, with teams drawn from smaller localities within part of the area of the major Western Border Football League.

== History ==
=== 1969 as three leagues come together ===
| Portland DFL | Wins | Byes | Losses | Draws | For | Against | % | Pts |
|---|---|---|---|---|---|---|---|---|
| Tyrendarra | 16 | 0 | 2 | 0 | 1828 | 993 | 184.09% | 64 |
| Winnap | 13 | 0 | 5 | 0 | 1338 | 1254 | 106.70% | 52 |
| Branxholme | 10 | 0 | 7 | 1 | 1326 | 1244 | 106.59% | 42 |
| Heathmere | 9 | 0 | 8 | 1 | 1554 | 1303 | 119.26% | 38 |
| Dartmoor | 9 | 0 | 9 | 0 | 1380 | 1275 | 108.24% | 36 |
| Merino-Digby | 6 | 0 | 11 | 1 | 1537 | 1634 | 94.06% | 26 |
| Wallacedale | 4 | 0 | 14 | 0 | 1130 | 1734 | 65.17% | 16 |
| Westerns | 3 | 0 | 14 | 1 | 965 | 1621 | 59.53% | 14 |

Finals

| Final | Team | G | B | Pts | Team | G | B | Pts |
|---|---|---|---|---|---|---|---|---|
| 1st Semi | Branxholme | 17 | 12 | 114 | Heathmere | 10 | 9 | 69 |
| 2nd Semi | Tyrendarra | 13 | 13 | 91 | Winnap | 8 | 11 | 59 |
| Preliminary | Winnap | 11 | 9 | 75 | Branxholme | 9 | 9 | 63 |
| Grand | Tyrendarra | 8 | 12 | 60 | Winnap | 4 | 4 | 28 |

| Port Fairy FL | Wins | Byes | Losses | Draws | For | Against | % | Pts |
|---|---|---|---|---|---|---|---|---|
| Penshurst | 12 | 0 | 2 | 1 | 1664 | 706 | 235.69% | 50 |
| Macarthur | 12 | 0 | 3 | 0 | 1457 | 842 | 173.04% | 48 |
| Hawkesdale | 9 | 0 | 6 | 0 | 1113 | 909 | 122.44% | 36 |
| Yambuk | 7 | 0 | 7 | 1 | 1197 | 1081 | 110.73% | 30 |
| Bessiebelle | 4 | 0 | 11 | 0 | 1131 | 1182 | 95.69% | 16 |
| Port Fairy | 0 | 0 | 15 | 0 | 491 | 2333 | 21.05% | 0 |

Finals

| Final | Team | G | B | Pts | Team | G | B | Pts |
|---|---|---|---|---|---|---|---|---|
| 1st Semi | Yambuk | 15 | 5 | 95 | Hawkesdale | 7 | 7 | 49 |
| 2nd Semi | Penshurst | 15 | 11 | 101 | Macarthur | 12 | 3 | 75 |
| Preliminary | Macarthur | 17 | 15 | 117 | Yambuk | 16 | 5 | 101 |
| Grand | Penshurst | 10 | 13 | 73 | Macarthur | 6 | 12 | 48 |

| Glenelg FL | Wins | Byes | Losses | Draws | For | Against | % | Pts |
|---|---|---|---|---|---|---|---|---|
| Cavendish | 17 | 3 | 1 | 0 | 2580 | 737 | 350.07% | 68 |
| Sandford | 14 | 3 | 4 | 0 | 1831 | 1084 | 168.91% | 56 |
| Pigeon Ponds | 13 | 3 | 5 | 0 | 1696 | 1090 | 155.60% | 52 |
| Harrow | 10 | 3 | 8 | 0 | 1385 | 1066 | 129.92% | 40 |
| Wando Vale | 5 | 3 | 13 | 0 | 1177 | 1594 | 73.84% | 20 |
| Bahgallah | 3 | 3 | 15 | 0 | 946 | 2211 | 42.79% | 12 |
| Dergholm | 1 | 3 | 17 | 0 | 571 | 2404 | 23.75% | 4 |

FINALS

| Final | Team | G | B | Pts | Team | G | B | Pts |
|---|---|---|---|---|---|---|---|---|
| 1st Semi | Pigeon Ponds | 7 | 9 | 51 | Harrow | 2 | 8 | 20 |
| 2nd Semi | Cavendish | 14 | 15 | 99 | Sandford | 5 | 6 | 36 |
| Preliminary | Pigeon Ponds | 11 | 8 | 74 | Sandford | 10 | 4 | 64 |
| Grand | Cavendish | 15 | 15 | 105 | Pigeon Ponds | 8 | 8 | 56 |

The league was formed in 1970 under the name Portland Port Fairy Football League.

Of the 14 founding clubs, eight came from the Portland and District Football League, three from the Port Fairy Football League and three from the Glenelg Football League.

The league was renamed the South West District Football League in 1983.

== Clubs ==
=== Locations ===
Locations of the South West District FNL clubs

=== Current ===
Six of the current 8 teams were present in the league on formation in 1970 (Branxholme and Wallacedale as separate teams). Coleraine joined from the Western Border Football League in 1995, and Heywood commenced in 2012.

| Club | Jumper | Nickname | Home Ground | Former League | Est. | Years in SWDFNL | SWDFNL Senior Premierships | |
| Club | Jumper | Nickname | Home Ground | Former League | Est. | Years in SWDFNL | Total | Years |
|---|---|---|---|---|---|---|---|---|
| Branxholme-Wallacedale | | Saints | Branxholme Recreation Reserve, Branxholme | – | 1982 | 1982– | 1 | 1983 |
| Cavendish | | Bloods | Cavendish Recreation Reserve, Cavendish | GFL | 1900s | 1970– | 6 | 1973, 1974, 1992, 1993, 2022, 2025 |
| Coleraine | | Maroons | Coleraine Recreation Reserve, Coleraine | WBFL | 1900s | 1995– | 8 | 1996, 2005, 2007, 2008, 2009, 2010, 2013, 2023 |
| Dartmoor | | Giants | Dartmoor Recreation Reserve, Dartmoor | PDFL | 1920s | 1970– | 7 | 1979, 1980, 1982, 2011, 2014, 2017, 2026 |
| Heathmere | | Magpies | Heathmere Recreation Reserve, Heathmere | PDFL | 1920s | 1970– | 3 | 1989, 1990, 2002 |
| Heywood | | Lions | Heywood Recreation Reserve, Heywood | WBFL | 1920s | 2012– | 4 | 2012, 2015, 2018, 2019 |
| Tyrendarra | | Darras | Tyrendarra Recreation Reserve, Tyrendarra | PDFL | 1900s | 1970– | 10 | 1971, 1972, 1975, 1986, 2001, 2003, 2004, 2006, 2016, 2024 |
| Westerns | | Roos | Alexandra Park, Portland | PDFL | 1949 | 1970– | 8 | 1984, 1985, 1987, 1994, 1997, 1998, 1999, 2000 |

=== Former clubs ===
| Club | Jumper | Nickname | Home Ground | Former League | Est. | Years in SWDFNL | SWDFNL Senior Premierships | | Fate |
| Club | Jumper | Nickname | Home Ground | Former League | Est. | Years in SWDFNL | Total | Years | Fate |
|---|---|---|---|---|---|---|---|---|---|
| Balmoral | | Bombers | Balmoral Recreation Reserve, Balmoral | WWFL | 1900s | 1982–1996 | 1 | 1991 | Merged with Douglas-Harrow-Miga Lake to form Harrow Balmoral in Horsham & District FL in 1997 |
| Bessiebelle | | Tigers | Bessiebelle Recreation Reserve, Bessiebelle | PFFL | 1900s | 1970–1995, 1997–1998 | 0 | - | Went into recess for 1996, returned playing games in Portland and folded in 1999 |
| Branxholme | | Ramblers | Branxholme Recreation Reserve, Branxholme | PDFL | 1919 | 1970–1981 | 0 | - | Merged with Wallacedale in 1982 to form Branxholme-Wallacedale |
| Macarthur | | Demons | Macarthur Recreation Reserve, Macarthur | PFFL | 1890s | 1970–1997 | 4 | 1970, 1981, 1988, 1995 | Merged with Hawkesdale in 1998 and moved to Mininera & District FL |
| Merino-Digby | (1970–89)(1990) | | Merino Recreation Reserve, Merino | PDFL | 1954 | 1970–1990 | 0 | - | Folded in 1991 |
| Pigeon Ponds | | | Pigeon Ponds Recreation Reserve, Pigeon Ponds | GFL | 1920s | 1970–1983 | 0 | - | Folded in 1984 |
| Sandford | | Villagers | Sandford Recreation Reserve, Sandford | GFL | 1900s | 1970–2013 | 0 | - | Merged with Casterton to form Casterton-Sandford in Western Border FL in 2014 |
| Wallacedale | | Swamp Hawks | Wallacedale Oval, Wallacedale | PDFL | 1900s | 1970–1981 | 0 | - | Merged with Branxholme in 1982 |
| Winnap | | | Winnap Recreation Reserve, Winnap | PDFL | 1920s | 1970–1975 | 0 | - | Folded in 1976 |
| Yambuk | | Blues | Yambuk Recreation Reserve, Yambuk | PFFL | 1920s | 1970–1980 | 3 | 1976, 1977, 1978 | Moved to Warrnambool District FL in 1981 |

== Premierships ==
- 1970 Macarthur 14 11 95 defeated Cavendish 7 14 56
- 1971 Tyrendarra 14 13 97 defeated Macarthur 11 10 76
- 1972 Tyrendarra 16 22 118 defeated Heathmere 11 16 82
- 1973 Cavendish 15 11 101 defeated Bessiebelle 14 11 95
- 1974 Cavendish 13 8 86 defeated Westerns 6 6 42
- 1975 Tyrendarra 10 16 76 defeated Westerns 8 12 60
- 1976 Yambuk 16 12 108 defeated Tyrendarra 10 11 71
- 1977 Yambuk 7 12 54 defeated Westerns 6 10 46
- 1978 Yambuk 17 12 114 defeated Wallacedale 10 13 73
- 1979 Dartmoor 16 14 110 defeated Yambuk 12 9 81
- 1980 Dartmoor 16 25 121 defeated Bessiebelle 12 4 76
- 1981 Macarthur 16 15 111 defeated Cavendish 8 15 63
- 1982 Dartmoor 22 16 148 defeated Heathmere 10 10 70
- 1983 Branxholme-Wallacedale 20 10 130 defeated Dartmoor 18 11 119
- 1984 Westerns 12 8 80 defeated Tyrendarra 10 14 74
- 1985 Westerns 16 7 103 defeated Heathmere 11 18 84
- 1986 Tyrendarra 18 19 127 defeated Westerns 12 6 78
- 1987 Westerns 13 7 85 defeated Heathmere 11 18 84
- 1988 Macarthur 17 19 121 defeated Westerns 17 13 115
- 1989 Heathmere 18 14 122 defeated Balmoral 12 8 80
- 1990 Heathmere 19 17 131 defeated Cavendish 10 6 66
- 1991 Balmoral 17 14 116 defeated Heathmere 12 12 84
- 1992 Cavendish 14 10 94 defeated Westerns 5 21 51
- 1993 Cavendish 13 10 88 defeated Westerns 10 9 69
- 1994 Westerns 17 8 110 defeated Cavendish 12 10 82
- 1995 Macarthur 11 18 84 defeated Sandford 8 14 62
- 1996 Coleraine 12 9 81 defeated Sandford 9 4 58
- 1997 Westerns 13 9 87 defeated Coleraine 10 12 72
- 1998 Westerns 11 15 81 defeated Tyrendarra 9 8 62
- 1999 Westerns 14 16 100 defeated Heathmere 11 6 72
- 2000 Westerns 15 18 108 defeated Heathmere 9 6 60
- 2001 Tyrendarra 11 8 74 defeated Heathmere 9 18 72
- 2002 Heathmere 20 10 130 defeated Tyrendarra 14 11 95
- 2003 Tyrendarra 14 12 96 defeated Coleraine 5 3 33
- 2004 Tyrendarra 8 12 60 defeated Heathmere 7 12 54
- 2005 Coleraine 10 12 72 defeated Tyrendarra 4 6 30
- 2006 Tyrendarra 14 10 94 defeated Coleraine 7 4 46
- 2007 Coleraine 10 12 72 defeated Tyrendarra 10 11 71
- 2008 Coleraine 9 12 66 defeated Tyrendarra 5 11 41
- 2009 Coleraine 11 13 79 defeated Westerns 4 8 32
- 2010 Coleraine 11 13 79 defeated Westerns 9 10 64
- 2011 Dartmoor 9 12 66 defeated Tyrendarra 4 10 34
- 2012 Heywood 18 9 117 defeated Westerns 11 11 77
- 2013 Coleraine 15 6 96 defeated Heywood 9 10 64
- 2014 Dartmoor 12 13 85 defeated Heywood 10 9 69
- 2015 Heywood 8 17 65 defeated Tyrendarra 5 12 42
- 2016 Tyrendarra 8 11 59 defeated Coleraine 7 9 51
- 2017 Dartmoor 12 13 85 defeated Heywood 11 13 79
- 2018 Heywood 11 18 84 defeated Heathmere 8 6 54
- 2019 Heywood 10 11 71 defeated Tyrendarra 3 4 22
- 2021 Dartmoor Minor Premiers Awarded
- 2022 Cavendish 15 9 99 defeated Dartmoor 3 6 24
- 2023 Coleraine 9 7 61 defeated Cavendish 4 9 33
- 2024 Tyrendarra 9 6 60 defeated Dartmoor 7 9 51
- 2025 Cavendish 9 6 60 defeated Dartmoor 6 11 47
- 2026 Dartmoor 3 14 32 defeated Tyrendarra 1 2 8

=== League Awards ===
| Year | League Best & Fairest | Leading Goal Kicker | H&A goals | Finals goals | Total Goals |
|---|---|---|---|---|---|
| 1970 | Merv Peters (Tyrendarra) | Kevin Malseed (Macarthur) | 106 | 9 | 115 |
| 1971 | Trevor Krause (Branxholme) | Kevin Malseed (Macarthur) | 120 | 18 | 138 |
| 1972 | Stan Foote (Dartmoor) | Kevin Malseed (Macarthur) | 137 | 11 | 148 |
| 1973 | Trevor Krause (Wallacedale) | Garry Johnston (Bessiebelle) | 80 | 19 | 99 |
| 1974 | Robert Sinnott (Yambuk) | Graham Edwards (Winnap) | 80 | 2 | 82 |
| 1975 | Barrie Robinson (Heathmere) | Kevin Saunders (Western) | 74 | 5 | 79 |
| 1976 | Pat Fallon (Cavendish) | Garry McDonald (Tyrendarra) | 64 | 8 | 72 |
| 1977 | Greg Frost (Tyrendarra) | Linton Smith (Tyrendarra) | 75 | 0 | 75 |
| 1978 | Anthony Bourke (Bessiebelle) | Darryl Rose (Wallacedale) | 83 | 4 | 87 |
| 1979 | Peter Sharp (Dartmoor) | P Atkinson (Branxholme) | 76 | 6 | 82 |
| 1980 | Daryl Watts (Bessiebelle) | Ray Albert (Dartmoor) | 81 | 0 | 110 |
| 1981 | Kevin Radley (Heathmere) | Ray Albert (Dartmoor) | 76 | 0 | 76 |
| 1982 | Brenton Primmer (Dartmoor) | Greg Lipscombe (Dartmoor) | 0 | 113 | 113 |
| 1983 | Tony Curran (Tyrendarra) | Ray Albert (Dartmoor) | 0 | 129 | 129 |
| 1984 | Barry Waight (Branxholme-Wallacedale) | Paul Hunter (Balmoral) | 129 | 2 | 131 |
| 1985 | Phillip Doyle (Sandford) | Wes Smith (Heathmere) | 147 | 5 | 152 |
| 1986 | Phillip Doyle (Sandford) | C Jorgenson (Heathmere) | 85 | 1 | 86 |
| 1987 | Tony Hutchins (Balmoral) | Tim Walkenhorst (Branxholme-Wallacedale) | 85 | 15 | 100 |
| 1988 | John Rooke (Sandford) | Shane Dempsey (Balmoral) | 107 | 0 | 107 |
| 1989 | Colin Howe (Macarthur) | Shane Dempsey (Balmoral) | 145 | 23 | 168 |
| 1990 | Mick Mahoney (Branxholme-Wallacedale) | Luke Hampshire (Tyrendarra) | 130 | 0 | 130 |
| 1991 | Dale Sullivan (Sandford) | Robert Harman (Branxholme-Wallacedale) | 84 | 0 | 84 |
| 1992 | Troy O'Callaghan (Balmoral) | B Finck (Heathmere) | 72 | 0 | 72 |
| 1993 | John Herbertson (Westerns) | Jeff Gill ( Sandford) | 98 | 0 | 98 |
| 1994 | Mark Brown (Cavendish) | Robert Harman (Branxholme-Wallacedale) | 87 | 0 | 87 |
| 1995 | David Gould (Macarthur) Dale Hirst (Sandford) | Troy Wilson (Tyrendarra) | 68 | 0 | 68 |
| 1996 | Richard Brown (Balmoral) | D Wiley (Heathmere) | 61 | 5 | 66 |
| 1997 | Pat Farrant (Branxholme-Wallacedale) | Pat Farrant (Branxholme-Wallacedale) | 71 | 1 | 72 |
| 1998 | Bevan Lipscome (Dartmoor) | Pat Farrant (Branxholme-Wallacedale) | 84 | 0 | 84 |
| 1999 | Michael Harrison (Branxholme-Wallacedale) | Craig Rhook (Branxholme-Wallacedale) | 55 | 13 | 68 |
| 2000 | Dale Hirst (Sandford) | Jeremy Duncan (Westerns) | 92 | 22 | 114 |
| 2001 | Lachie McRae (Cavendish) | Craig Rhook (Dartmoor) | 67 | 2 | 69 |
| 2002 | Michael Watts (Sandford) | D Sandeman(Western) | 71 | 5 | 76 |
| 2003 | Andy Willis (Tyrendarra) | Kym Eagleson (Sandford) | 98 | 3 | 101 |
| 2004 | Kaleb Sherwell (Tyrendarra) Lachlan McRae (Sandford) | Nathan Bennett (Tyrendarra) | 109 | 6 | 115 |
| 2005 | Kaleb Sherwell (Tyrendarra) | Danny Pridham (Dartmoor) | 118 | 1 | 119 |
| 2006 | Simon Bampfield (Westerns) | Glen Fry (Coleraine) | 135 | 0 | 135 |
| 2007 | Richard Steele (Tyrendarra) | Kym Eagleson (Sandford) | 122 | 10 | 132 |
| 2008 | Richard Steele (Westerns) | Kym Eagleson (Sandford) | 73 | 0 | 73 |
| 2009 | Zac McDonald (Coleraine) | Mick Wilson (Heathmere) | 85 | 0 | 85 |
| 2010 | Sam Anson (Westerns) | Jason McCrae (Dartmoor) | 102 | 0 | 102 |
| 2011 | Jarryd Lewis (Coleraine) | Jason McCrae (Dartmoor) | 105 | 13 | 118 |
| 2012 | Hayden Dyke (Westerns) | Timothy Annett (Westerns) | 68 | 9 | 77 |
| 2013 | Stephen O'Brien (Heywood) | Mick Wilson (Heywood) | 110 | 3 | 113 |
| 2014 | Stephen O'Brien (Westerns) | Jason McCrae (Dartmoor) | 100 | 0 | 100 |
| 2015 | Nathan Curtis (Cavendish) | Mick Wilson (Heywood) | 76 | 1 | 77 |
| 2016 | Korrey Smith (Dartmoor) | Jason McCrae (Dartmoor) | 66 | 3 | 69 |
| 2017 | Thomas Lambevski (Branxholme-Wallacedale) | Jason McCrae (Dartmoor) | 65 | 9 | 74 |
| 2018 | Tyson Hogan (Coleraine) | Mick Wilson (Heathmere) | 73 | 8 | 81 |
| 2019 | Josh Andrews (Heathmere) | Christian Howlett (Dartmoor) Leon Davis (Heathmere) | 69 70 | 1 0 | 70 70 |
| 2021 | Jayden Polaski (Dartmoor) | Patrick Sinnott (Coleraine) | 37 | - | 37 |
| 2022 | Sam Gibson (Cavendish) | Christian Howlett (Dartmoor) | 56 | 14 | 70 |
| 2023 | Nyawi Moore (Heywood) | Patrick Sinnott (Coleraine) | 58 | 4 | 62 |
| 2024 | Sam Anson (Tyrendarra) | Jordi Withers (Tyrendarra) | 78 | 13 | 91 |
| 2025 | Ethan Murdock (Dartmoor) | Jordi Withers (Tyrendarra) | 70 | 6 | 76 |

== Notable former players ==
Despite some clubs not having junior sides, some former players have played at the highest level.

Wally Lovett - Tyrendarra

David Mitchell - Heathmere

Brett Gloury - Balmoral

Luke Hampshire Drafted in 1990 AFL draft - Tyrendarra

Marcus Picken - Macarthur

Jeremy Cameron - Dartmoor

Jamaine Jones - Heywood

== Historical ladders ==
=== 1970 (foundation season) ===
| Club | Wins | Losses | Draws | Pts |
|---|---|---|---|---|
| Macarthur | 18 | 0 | 0 | 72 |
| Cavendish | 16 | 2 | 0 | 64 |
| Yambuk | 14 | 3 | 1 | 58 |
| Tyrendarra | 14 | 4 | 0 | 56 |
| Dartmoor | 10 | 8 | 0 | 40 |
| Westerns | 9 | 9 | 0 | 36 |
| Winnap | 9 | 9 | 0 | 36 |
| Bessiebelle | 7 | 11 | 0 | 28 |
| Wallacedale | 7 | 11 | 0 | 28 |
| Pigeon Ponds | 6 | 12 | 0 | 24 |
| Heathmere | 5 | 12 | 1 | 22 |
| Branxholme | 5 | 13 | 0 | 20 |
| Sandford | 5 | 13 | 0 | 20 |
| Merino-Digby | 0 | 18 | 0 | 0 |

== 2004 Ladder ==
| South West DFL | Wins | Byes | Losses | Draws | For | Against | % | Pts | Final | Team | G | B | Pts | Team | G | B | Pts |
|---|---|---|---|---|---|---|---|---|---|---|---|---|---|---|---|---|---|
| Tyrendarra | 17 | 0 | 1 | 0 | 2429 | 805 | 301.74% | 68 | Elimination | Dartmoor | 18 | 11 | 119 | Cavendish | 22 | 14 | 146 |
| Heathmere | 15 | 0 | 3 | 0 | 2005 | 1293 | 155.07% | 60 | Qualifying | Heathmere | 18 | 16 | 124 | Coleraine | 12 | 12 | 84 |
| Coleraine | 12 | 0 | 6 | 0 | 1783 | 1218 | 146.39% | 48 | 1st Semi | Coleraine | 18 | 7 | 115 | Cavendish | 8 | 6 | 54 |
| Dartmoor | 9 | 0 | 9 | 0 | 1947 | 1806 | 107.81% | 36 | 2nd Semi | Tyrendarra | 26 | 12 | 168 | Heathmere | 16 | 11 | 107 |
| Cavendish | 9 | 0 | 9 | 0 | 1403 | 1677 | 83.66% | 36 | Preliminary | Heathmere | 15 | 18 | 108 | Coleraine | 10 | 10 | 70 |
| Westerns | 6 | 0 | 12 | 0 | 1369 | 1962 | 69.78% | 24 | Grand | Tyrendarra | 8 | 12 | 60 | Heathmere | 7 | 12 | 54 |
| Sandford | 2 | 0 | 16 | 0 | 1232 | 2199 | 56.03% | 8 | | | | | | | | | |
| Branxholme-Wallacedale | 2 | 0 | 16 | 0 | 1059 | 2267 | 46.71% | 8 | | | | | | | | | |

== 2005 Ladder ==
| South West DFL | Wins | Byes | Losses | Draws | For | Against | % | Pts | Final | Team | G | B | Pts | Team | G | B | Pts |
|---|---|---|---|---|---|---|---|---|---|---|---|---|---|---|---|---|---|
| Coleraine | 17 | 0 | 1 | 0 | 2638 | 1021 | 258.37% | 68 | Elimination | Cavendish | 18 | 11 | 119 | Sandford | 11 | 10 | 76 |
| Tyrendarra | 15 | 0 | 2 | 1 | 2592 | 1110 | 233.51% | 62 | Qualifying | Heathmere | 12 | 17 | 89 | Tyrendarra | 11 | 12 | 78 |
| Heathmere | 11 | 0 | 6 | 1 | 1921 | 1529 | 125.64% | 46 | 1st Semi | Tyrendarra | 31 | 14 | 200 | Cavendish | 5 | 6 | 36 |
| Cavendish | 8 | 0 | 10 | 0 | 1713 | 1877 | 91.26% | 32 | 2nd Semi | Coleraine | 21 | 17 | 143 | Heathmere | 10 | 11 | 71 |
| Sandford | 8 | 0 | 10 | 0 | 1962 | 1907 | 102.88% | 32 | Preliminary | Tyrendarra | 26 | 14 | 170 | Heathmere | 12 | 10 | 82 |
| Dartmoor | 7 | 0 | 11 | 0 | 2270 | 1952 | 116.29% | 28 | Grand | Coleraine | 10 | 12 | 72 | Tyrendarra | 4 | 6 | 30 |
| Westerns | 4 | 0 | 14 | 0 | 1366 | 2690 | 50.78% | 16 | | | | | | | | | |
| Branxholme-Wallacedale | 1 | 0 | 17 | 0 | 864 | 3240 | 26.67% | 4 | | | | | | | | | |

== 2006 Ladder ==
| South West DFL | Wins | Byes | Losses | Draws | For | Against | % | Pts | Final | Team | G | B | Pts | Team | G | B | Pts |
|---|---|---|---|---|---|---|---|---|---|---|---|---|---|---|---|---|---|
| Coleraine | 17 | 0 | 1 | 0 | 2917 | 1126 | 259.06% | 68 | Elimination | Branxholme-Wallacedale | 16 | 16 | 112 | Sandford | 12 | 10 | 82 |
| Tyrendarra | 16 | 0 | 2 | 0 | 2521 | 1317 | 191.42% | 64 | Qualifying | Tyrendarra | 2 | 16 | 28 | Westerns | 13 | 12 | 90 |
| Westerns | 11 | 0 | 7 | 0 | 1799 | 1922 | 93.60% | 44 | 1st Semi | Westerns | 12 | 14 | 86 | Branxholme-Wallacedale | 15 | 10 | 100 |
| Branxholme-Wallacedale | 10 | 0 | 8 | 0 | 2085 | 1882 | 110.79% | 40 | 2nd Semi | Coleraine | 20 | 7 | 127 | Tyrendarra | 14 | 9 | 93 |
| Sandford | 9 | 0 | 9 | 0 | 1957 | 2087 | 93.77% | 36 | Preliminary | Tyrendarra | 29 | 12 | 186 | Branxholme-Wallacedale | 15 | 11 | 101 |
| Dartmoor | 4 | 0 | 14 | 0 | 1661 | 2495 | 66.57% | 16 | Grand | Tyrendarra | 14 | 10 | 94 | Coleraine | 7 | 4 | 46 |
| Cavendish | 4 | 0 | 14 | 0 | 1381 | 2331 | 59.24% | 16 | | | | | | | | | |
| Heathmere | 1 | 0 | 17 | 0 | 1281 | 2442 | 52.46% | 4 | | | | | | | | | |

== 2007 Ladder ==
| South West DFL | Wins | Byes | Losses | Draws | For | Against | % | Pts | Final | Team | G | B | Pts | Team | G | B | Pts |
|---|---|---|---|---|---|---|---|---|---|---|---|---|---|---|---|---|---|
| Tyrendarra | 16 | 0 | 2 | 0 | 2212 | 1350 | 163.85% | 64 | Elimination | Westerns | 16 | 11 | 107 | Heathmere | 21 | 16 | 142 |
| Sandford | 13 | 0 | 5 | 0 | 2248 | 1431 | 157.09% | 52 | Qualifying | Sandford | 26 | 9 | 165 | Coleraine | 14 | 9 | 93 |
| Coleraine | 11 | 0 | 7 | 0 | 2169 | 1544 | 140.48% | 44 | 1st Semi | Coleraine | 23 | 22 | 160 | Heathmere | 14 | 16 | 100 |
| Westerns | 10 | 0 | 8 | 0 | 1580 | 1679 | 94.10% | 40 | 2nd Semi | Tyrendarra | 12 | 22 | 94 | Sandford | 11 | 6 | 72 |
| Heathmere | 9 | 0 | 9 | 0 | 2216 | 1717 | 129.06% | 36 | Preliminary | Coleraine | 21 | 11 | 137 | Sandford | 11 | 8 | 74 |
| Branxholme-Wallacedale | 9 | 0 | 9 | 0 | 1869 | 1661 | 112.52% | 36 | Grand | Coleraine | 10 | 12 | 72 | Tyrendarra | 10 | 11 | 71 |
| Cavendish | 3 | 0 | 15 | 0 | 1465 | 2004 | 73.10% | 12 | | | | | | | | | |
| Dartmoor | 1 | 0 | 17 | 0 | 1033 | 3406 | 30.33% | 4 | | | | | | | | | |

== 2008 Ladder ==
| South West DFL | Wins | Byes | Losses | Draws | For | Against | % | Pts | Final | Team | G | B | Pts | Team | G | B | Pts |
|---|---|---|---|---|---|---|---|---|---|---|---|---|---|---|---|---|---|
| Tyrendarra | 16 | 0 | 2 | 0 | 1660 | 1091 | 152.15% | 64 | Elimination | Dartmoor | 12 | 7 | 79 | Sandford | 9 | 7 | 61 |
| Heathmere | 12 | 0 | 6 | 0 | 1735 | 1253 | 138.47% | 48 | Qualifying | Coleraine | 17 | 9 | 111 | Heathmere | 12 | 7 | 79 |
| Coleraine | 12 | 0 | 6 | 0 | 1705 | 1396 | 122.13% | 48 | 1st Semi | Dartmoor | 15 | 8 | 98 | Heathmere | 11 | 16 | 82 |
| Sandford | 10 | 0 | 8 | 0 | 1457 | 1453 | 100.28% | 40 | 2nd Semi | Coleraine | 12 | 12 | 84 | Tyrendarra | 3 | 5 | 23 |
| Dartmoor | 8 | 0 | 10 | 0 | 1543 | 1626 | 94.90% | 32 | Preliminary | Tyrendarra | 22 | 19 | 151 | Dartmoor | 6 | 4 | 40 |
| Westerns | 8 | 0 | 10 | 0 | 1397 | 1568 | 89.09% | 32 | Grand | Coleraine | 9 | 12 | 66 | Tyrendarra | 5 | 11 | 41 |
| Cavendish | 3 | 0 | 15 | 0 | 1322 | 1706 | 77.49% | 12 | | | | | | | | | |
| Branxholme-Wallacedale | 3 | 0 | 15 | 0 | 1074 | 1800 | 59.67% | 12 | | | | | | | | | |

== 2009 Ladder ==
| South West DFL | Wins | Byes | Losses | Draws | For | Against | % | Pts | Final | Team | G | B | Pts | Team | G | B | Pts |
|---|---|---|---|---|---|---|---|---|---|---|---|---|---|---|---|---|---|
| Westerns | 14 | 0 | 4 | 0 | 1967 | 1169 | 168.26% | 56 | Elimination | Cavendish | 12 | 12 | 84 | Tyrendarra | 7 | 6 | 48 |
| Coleraine | 12 | 0 | 6 | 0 | 1650 | 1125 | 146.67% | 48 | Qualifying | Coleraine | 15 | 9 | 99 | Heathmere | 15 | 5 | 95 |
| Heathmere | 12 | 0 | 6 | 0 | 1845 | 1291 | 142.91% | 48 | 1st Semi | Cavendish | 9 | 14 | 68 | Heathmere | 7 | 19 | 61 |
| Tyrendarra | 11 | 0 | 7 | 0 | 1659 | 1098 | 151.09% | 44 | 2nd Semi | Coleraine | 5 | 15 | 45 | Westerns | 4 | 7 | 31 |
| Cavendish | 11 | 0 | 7 | 0 | 1505 | 1212 | 124.17% | 44 | Preliminary | Westerns | 18 | 11 | 119 | Cavendish | 8 | 10 | 58 |
| Dartmoor | 8 | 0 | 10 | 0 | 1857 | 1412 | 131.52% | 32 | Grand | Coleraine | 11 | 13 | 79 | Westerns | 4 | 8 | 32 |
| Sandford | 4 | 0 | 14 | 0 | 1153 | 1914 | 60.24% | 16 | | | | | | | | | |
| Branxholme-Wallacedale | 0 | 0 | 18 | 0 | 724 | 3139 | 23.06% | 0 | | | | | | | | | |

== 2010 Ladder ==
| South West DFL | Wins | Byes | Losses | Draws | For | Against | % | Pts | Final | Team | G | B | Pts | Team | G | B | Pts |
|---|---|---|---|---|---|---|---|---|---|---|---|---|---|---|---|---|---|
| Coleraine | 16 | 0 | 1 | 1 | 2245 | 891 | 251.96% | 66 | Elimination | Cavendish | 14 | 13 | 97 | Dartmoor | 12 | 15 | 87 |
| Tyrendarra | 13 | 0 | 5 | 0 | 1803 | 1009 | 178.69% | 52 | Qualifying | Westerns | 18 | 9 | 117 | Tyrendarra | 14 | 10 | 94 |
| Westerns | 12 | 0 | 4 | 2 | 1891 | 1291 | 146.48% | 52 | 1st Semi | Tyrendarra | 18 | 12 | 120 | Cavendish | 12 | 2 | 74 |
| Dartmoor | 12 | 0 | 6 | 0 | 1859 | 1331 | 139.67% | 48 | 2nd Semi | Coleraine | 19 | 12 | 126 | Westerns | 3 | 6 | 24 |
| Cavendish | 7 | 0 | 10 | 1 | 1433 | 1501 | 95.47% | 30 | Preliminary | Westerns | 8 | 5 | 53 | Tyrendarra | 7 | 8 | 50 |
| Heathmere | 6 | 0 | 11 | 1 | 1417 | 1745 | 81.20% | 26 | Grand | Coleraine | 11 | 13 | 79 | Westerns | 9 | 10 | 64 |
| Sandford | 3 | 0 | 14 | 1 | 1192 | 1940 | 61.44% | 14 | | | | | | | | | |
| Branxholme-Wallacedale | 0 | 0 | 18 | 0 | 736 | 2868 | 25.66% | 0 | | | | | | | | | |

== 2011 Ladder ==
| South West DFL | Wins | Byes | Losses | Draws | For | Against | % | Pts | Final | Team | G | B | Pts | Team | G | B | Pts |
|---|---|---|---|---|---|---|---|---|---|---|---|---|---|---|---|---|---|
| Dartmoor | 14 | 0 | 3 | 1 | 2275 | 1089 | 208.91% | 58 | Elimination | Westerns | 18 | 8 | 116 | Heathmere | 17 | 4 | 106 |
| Tyrendarra | 14 | 0 | 4 | 0 | 1910 | 1051 | 181.73% | 56 | Qualifying | Tyrendarra | 10 | 13 | 73 | Coleraine | 7 | 8 | 50 |
| Coleraine | 13 | 0 | 5 | 0 | 1647 | 1250 | 131.76% | 52 | 1st Semi | Coleraine | 15 | 8 | 98 | Westerns | 10 | 9 | 69 |
| Heathmere | 11 | 0 | 7 | 0 | 1784 | 1468 | 121.53% | 44 | 2nd Semi | Tyrendarra | 15 | 14 | 104 | Dartmoor | 9 | 11 | 65 |
| Westerns | 10 | 0 | 7 | 1 | 1743 | 1401 | 124.41% | 42 | Preliminary | Dartmoor | 9 | 15 | 69 | Coleraine | 9 | 7 | 61 |
| Branxholme-Wallacedale | 6 | 0 | 12 | 0 | 1278 | 1898 | 67.33% | 24 | Grand | Dartmoor | 9 | 12 | 66 | Tyrendarra | 4 | 10 | 34 |
| Sandford | 2 | 0 | 16 | 0 | 1146 | 2514 | 45.58% | 8 | | | | | | | | | |
| Cavendish | 1 | 0 | 17 | 0 | 1095 | 2207 | 49.61% | 4 | | | | | | | | | |

== 2012 Ladder ==
| South West DFL | Wins | Byes | Losses | Draws | For | Against | % | Pts | Final | Team | G | B | Pts | Team | G | B | Pts |
|---|---|---|---|---|---|---|---|---|---|---|---|---|---|---|---|---|---|
| Westerns | 15 | 2 | 1 | 0 | 2019 | 857 | 235.59% | 60 | Elimination | Dartmoor | 19 | 11 | 125 | Coleraine | 6 | 10 | 46 |
| Heywood | 14 | 2 | 2 | 0 | 2061 | 867 | 237.72% | 56 | Qualifying | Heywood | 12 | 14 | 86 | Tyrendarra | 10 | 3 | 63 |
| Tyrendarra | 10 | 2 | 6 | 0 | 1604 | 1065 | 150.61% | 40 | 1st Semi | Tyrendarra | 11 | 9 | 75 | Dartmoor | 9 | 9 | 63 |
| Dartmoor | 9 | 2 | 7 | 0 | 1653 | 1185 | 139.49% | 36 | 2nd Semi | Heywood | 14 | 11 | 95 | Westerns | 11 | 12 | 78 |
| Coleraine | 8 | 2 | 8 | 0 | 1304 | 991 | 131.58% | 32 | Preliminary | Westerns | 17 | 10 | 112 | Tyrendarra | 11 | 7 | 73 |
| Cavendish | 8 | 2 | 8 | 0 | 1445 | 1322 | 109.30% | 32 | Grand | Heywood | 18 | 9 | 117 | Westerns | 11 | 11 | 77 |
| Heathmere | 5 | 2 | 11 | 0 | 1247 | 1392 | 89.58% | 20 | | | | | | | | | |
| Sandford | 3 | 2 | 13 | 0 | 1111 | 1823 | 60.94% | 12 | | | | | | | | | |
| Branxholme-Wallacedale | 0 | 2 | 16 | 0 | 271 | 3213 | 8.43% | 0 | | | | | | | | | |

== 2013 Ladder ==
| South West DFL | Wins | Byes | Losses | Draws | For | Against | % | Pts | Final | Team | G | B | Pts | Team | G | B | Pts |
|---|---|---|---|---|---|---|---|---|---|---|---|---|---|---|---|---|---|
| Heywood | 16 | 2 | 0 | 0 | 2207 | 751 | 293.87% | 64 | Elimination | Westerns | 10 | 15 | 75 | Tyrendarra | 6 | 5 | 41 |
| Coleraine | 13 | 2 | 3 | 0 | 1715 | 863 | 198.73% | 52 | Qualifying | Coleraine | 18 | 12 | 120 | Dartmoor | 6 | 1 | 37 |
| Dartmoor | 11 | 2 | 5 | 0 | 1520 | 1231 | 123.48% | 44 | 1st Semi | Dartmoor | 14 | 12 | 96 | Westerns | 8 | 17 | 65 |
| Tyrendarra | 11 | 2 | 5 | 0 | 1373 | 1198 | 114.61% | 44 | 2nd Semi | Heywood | 8 | 14 | 62 | Coleraine | 7 | 11 | 53 |
| Westerns | 6 | 2 | 10 | 0 | 1299 | 1187 | 109.44% | 24 | Preliminary | Coleraine | 14 | 12 | 96 | Dartmoor | 11 | 12 | 78 |
| Sandford | 6 | 2 | 10 | 0 | 1214 | 1485 | 81.75% | 24 | Grand | Coleraine | 15 | 6 | 96 | Heywood | 9 | 10 | 64 |
| Cavendish | 6 | 2 | 10 | 0 | 1139 | 1582 | 72.00% | 24 | | | | | | | | | |
| Heathmere | 2 | 2 | 14 | 0 | 828 | 1745 | 47.45% | 8 | | | | | | | | | |
| Branxholme-Wallacedale | 1 | 2 | 15 | 0 | 672 | 1925 | 34.91% | 4 | | | | | | | | | |

== 2014 Ladder ==
| South West DFL | Wins | Byes | Losses | Draws | For | Against | % | Pts | Final | Team | G | B | Pts | Team | G | B | Pts |
|---|---|---|---|---|---|---|---|---|---|---|---|---|---|---|---|---|---|
| Dartmoor | 18 | 0 | 0 | 0 | 2606 | 665 | 391.88% | 72 | Elimination | Tyrendarra | 8 | 10 | 58 | Westerns | 5 | 12 | 42 |
| Heywood | 15 | 0 | 3 | 0 | 1885 | 858 | 219.70% | 60 | Qualifying | Heywood | 12 | 12 | 84 | Coleraine | 3 | 4 | 22 |
| Coleraine | 12 | 0 | 6 | 0 | 1589 | 1205 | 131.87% | 48 | 1st Semi | Coleraine | 15 | 11 | 101 | Tyrendarra | 10 | 6 | 66 |
| Westerns | 9 | 0 | 8 | 1 | 1364 | 1552 | 87.89% | 38 | 2nd Semi | Dartmoor | 18 | 8 | 116 | Heywood | 11 | 12 | 78 |
| Tyrendarra | 9 | 0 | 9 | 0 | 1235 | 1340 | 92.16% | 36 | Preliminary | Heywood | 12 | 10 | 82 | Coleraine | 9 | 2 | 56 |
| Cavendish | 5 | 0 | 12 | 1 | 1189 | 1438 | 82.68% | 22 | Grand | Dartmoor | 12 | 13 | 85 | Heywood | 10 | 9 | 69 |
| Branxholme-Wallacedale | 3 | 0 | 15 | 0 | 979 | 1839 | 53.24% | 12 | | | | | | | | | |
| Heathmere | 0 | 0 | 18 | 0 | 540 | 2490 | 21.69% | 0 | | | | | | | | | |

== 2015 Ladder ==
| South West DFL | Wins | Byes | Losses | Draws | For | Against | % | Pts | Final | Team | G | B | Pts | Team | G | B | Pts |
|---|---|---|---|---|---|---|---|---|---|---|---|---|---|---|---|---|---|
| Heywood | 15 | 0 | 1 | 0 | 2228 | 579 | 384.80% | 60 | Elimination | Cavendish | 10 | 13 | 73 | Westerns | 11 | 3 | 69 |
| Coleraine | 14 | 0 | 2 | 0 | 1701 | 746 | 228.02% | 56 | Qualifying | Coleraine | 9 | 13 | 67 | Tyrendarra | 8 | 9 | 57 |
| Tyrendarra | 12 | 0 | 4 | 0 | 1669 | 926 | 180.24% | 48 | 1st Semi | Coleraine | 19 | 11 | 125 | Cavendish | 9 | 8 | 62 |
| Westerns | 9 | 0 | 7 | 0 | 1367 | 1084 | 126.11% | 36 | 2nd Semi | Heywood | 11 | 15 | 81 | Coleraine | 3 | 9 | 27 |
| Cavendish | 8 | 0 | 8 | 0 | 1463 | 1035 | 141.35% | 32 | Preliminary | Tyrendarra | 9 | 9 | 63 | Coleraine | 9 | 7 | 61 |
| Dartmoor | 4 | 0 | 12 | 0 | 1106 | 1783 | 62.03% | 16 | Grand | Heywood | 8 | 17 | 65 | Tyrendarra | 5 | 12 | 42 |
| Heathmere | 2 | 0 | 14 | 0 | 608 | 2249 | 27.03% | 8 | | | | | | | | | |
| Branxholme-Wallacedale | 0 | 0 | 16 | 0 | 559 | 2299 | 24.31% | 0 | | | | | | | | | |

== 2016 Ladder ==
| South West DFL | Wins | Byes | Losses | Draws | For | Against | % | Pts | Final | Team | G | B | Pts | Team | G | B | Pts |
|---|---|---|---|---|---|---|---|---|---|---|---|---|---|---|---|---|---|
| Tyrendarra | 16 | 0 | 0 | 0 | 1964 | 732 | 268.31% | 64 | Elimination | Cavendish | 7 | 12 | 54 | Heywood | 6 | 10 | 46 |
| Coleraine | 11 | 0 | 5 | 0 | 1409 | 992 | 142.04% | 44 | Qualifying | Coleraine | 13 | 10 | 88 | Dartmoor | 14 | 2 | 86 |
| Dartmoor | 11 | 0 | 5 | 0 | 1514 | 1101 | 137.51% | 44 | 1st Semi | Cavendish | 11 | 7 | 73 | Dartmoor | 10 | 9 | 69 |
| Cavendish | 9 | 0 | 7 | 0 | 1301 | 1077 | 120.80% | 36 | 2nd Semi | Tyrendarra | 8 | 10 | 58 | Coleraine | 6 | 10 | 46 |
| Heywood | 7 | 0 | 9 | 0 | 1210 | 1291 | 93.73% | 28 | Preliminary | Coleraine | 9 | 12 | 66 | Cavendish | 7 | 8 | 50 |
| Branxholme-Wallacedale | 5 | 0 | 11 | 0 | 1096 | 1408 | 77.84% | 20 | Grand | Tyrendarra | 8 | 11 | 59 | Coleraine | 7 | 9 | 51 |
| Westerns | 5 | 0 | 11 | 0 | 979 | 1536 | 63.74% | 20 | | | | | | | | | |
| Heathmere | 0 | 0 | 16 | 0 | 870 | 2206 | 39.44% | 0 | | | | | | | | | |

== 2017 Ladder ==
| South West DFL | Wins | Byes | Losses | Draws | For | Against | % | Pts | Final | Team | G | B | Pts | Team | G | B | Pts |
|---|---|---|---|---|---|---|---|---|---|---|---|---|---|---|---|---|---|
| Heywood | 16 | 0 | 0 | 0 | 2240 | 678 | 330.38% | 64 | Elimination | Heathmere | 11 | 6 | 72 | Branxholme-Wallacedale | 9 | 17 | 71 |
| Dartmoor | 12 | 0 | 4 | 0 | 1543 | 1185 | 130.21% | 48 | Qualifying | Westerns | 7 | 14 | 56 | Dartmoor | 7 | 10 | 52 |
| Westerns | 8 | 0 | 8 | 0 | 1274 | 1205 | 105.73% | 32 | 1st Semi | Dartmoor | 30 | 12 | 192 | Heathmere | 8 | 6 | 54 |
| Branxholme-Wallacedale | 8 | 0 | 8 | 0 | 1037 | 1318 | 78.68% | 32 | 2nd Semi | Heywood | 22 | 16 | 148 | Westerns | 1 | 5 | 11 |
| Heathmere | 7 | 0 | 9 | 0 | 1198 | 1516 | 79.02% | 28 | Preliminary | Dartmoor | 13 | 12 | 90 | Westerns | 6 | 4 | 40 |
| Tyrendarra | 7 | 0 | 9 | 0 | 979 | 1318 | 74.28% | 28 | Grand | Dartmoor | 12 | 13 | 85 | Heywood | 11 | 13 | 79 |
| Cavendish | 4 | 0 | 12 | 0 | 1126 | 1440 | 78.19% | 16 | | | | | | | | | |
| Coleraine | 2 | 0 | 14 | 0 | 1006 | 1743 | 57.72% | 8 | | | | | | | | | |
