= Leo King =

Australian rules footballer

Personal information
- Born: 10 September 1955 (age 71)
- Original team: North Shore
- Height: 198 cm (6 ft 6 in)
- Weight: 85 kg (187 lb)

Playing career^{1}
Years	Club	Games (Goals)
1981	Geelong	4 (8)
- ^{1} Playing statistics correct to the end of 1981.

Leo King (born 10 September 1955) is a former Australian rules footballer who played with Geelong in the Victorian Football League (VFL).

== Geelong ==
King, a local North Shore recruit, was a member of Geelong's 1980 reserves premiership team. A forward/ruckman, King had a short but eventful time in the seniors, all four of his games coming in the 1981 season. He kicked three goals on his league debut, in round six against Melbourne, at the unfamiliar Sydney Cricket Ground. The following week he again kicked three, two in the final quarter, to help Geelong secure a narrow three point win over Hawthorn. His only appearance at his home ground, Kardinia Park, came in round eight, when Geelong went down to Carlton by five points. King had a chance to put his team in front in the dying minutes when he marked 15 metres from goal, on a 45 degree angle, but missed his shot. Geelong's round nine win over Fitzroy was King's final senior appearance. He finished the year with another reserves premiership.

== Post VFL career ==
In 1982 he began playing for Werribee and won their best and fairest award that year. He played for them again in 1983, then switched to Geelong West in 1984. From 1985 to 1988, then again in 1994, King was coach of Portland in the Western Border Football League. He won the league's best and fairest award in 1985, a premiership year. In 1986, King steered Portland to a second successive premiership.
