= Phil Carman =

Australian rules footballer, born 1950

Personal information
- Full name: Phillip Carman
- Born: 4 September 1950 (age 76); Edenhope, Victoria
- Height: 188 cm (6 ft 2 in)
- Weight: 87 kg (13 st 10 lb)

Playing career^{1}
Years	Club	Games (Goals)
1970, 1972–1974	Norwood	58 (89)
1975–1978	Collingwood	66 (142)
1979	Melbourne	11 (23)
1980–1981	Essendon	10 (12)
1982	North Melbourne	13 (27)
Total		158 (293)

Representative team honours
Years	Team	Games (Goals)
- South Australia
- Victoria

Coaching career
Years	Club	Games (W–L–D)
1983 & 1984	Eastlake	?
1985 - 1987	Kangaroo Flat	?
1988	Benalla	18 (5–13–0)
1990	Kennington	0 (0–0–0)
1995 - 2001	Sturt	149 (67–80–2)
2002	Kyneton	?
2003	Kangaroo Flat	18 (0–18–0)
2013	East Gambier	?
2014	Sebastopol	16 (0–16–0)
- ^{1} Playing statistics correct to the end of 1982.

Career highlights
- Club: Collingwood best and fairest: 1975; 2 x Collingwood leading goalkicker: 1975, 1976; Representative: National Football Carnival Championship: 1975

Phillip Carman (born 4 September 1950 in Edenhope, Victoria) is a former Australian rules footballer who represented Norwood in the SANFL and Collingwood, Melbourne, Essendon and North Melbourne in the Victorian Football League (VFL) during the 1970s and 1980s.

A flamboyant player who wore white boots and fronted the Tribunal on numerous occasions due to disciplinary issues, Carman was nicknamed "Fabulous Phil" by those who saw him play.

== Playing career ==
At the age of 16, Carman left his hometown in western Victoria to play for Norwood in the South Australian National Football League (SANFL). He played with Norwood from 1970 until 1974, spending two years out of the game because of a contract wrangle between Norwood and Collingwood and Collingwood's refusal to allow him to play for Norwood. In total, he played just 58 games for Norwood and several for the South Australian State side. One of his most colourful moments for Norwood was when he rubbed future Adelaide coach Graham Cornes’ face in the mud in front of the Norwood members stand after Cornes had elbowed him (the footage is also famous for Cornes flipping the bird at the Norwood members). By 1974, Collingwood, who had shown plenty of interest in him, finally persuaded him to return to Victoria, even though he did not like the football lifestyle in Melbourne.

Carman made an immediate impression. In his debut VFL season in 1975 he won Collingwood's Best and Fairest award, the Copeland Trophy, and was Collingwood's leading goalkicker with 41 goals. He was also selected to play for Victoria, and played in the Championship winning team of the Australian National Football Carnival. Carman did, however, break a bone in his foot during the season, keeping him out of Collingwood’s side for eight weeks. However, he still only finished three votes away from winning the VFL's Best and Fairest, the Brownlow Medal, in his debut year.

In the 1977 Second Semi Final win, Carman was suspended for two matches after striking Hawthorn's Michael Tuck. This caused him to miss the drawn Grand Final against North Melbourne and the subsequent replay. After the end of the 1978 VFL season, the 1978 season ended after the preliminary final, during which Carman was 'tagged' by Keith Greig. Greig did a wonderful job nullifying Carman, and eventually coach Tom Hafey moved Carman to centre half forward to albeit too late effect. The previous week (First Semi Final vs Carlton) Carman set the win up in the first two quarters with an electrifying display. He did incur the wrath of a number of Carlton strong arms, Messrs Buckley and Harms included. Later in the game Carman made an impact on the direction of Vin Cattogio's nose, before throwing the ball into the crowd after a great mark near the boundary. The loss against North Melbourne the following week saw the end of a number of genuine Collingwood champions.

Collingwood then swapped Carman for Ross Brewer of Melbourne. He spent one year with the Demons, before moving once again, to Essendon, where played two seasons, but was given a 20-week suspension for head-butting boundary umpire Graham Carbery, and also striking St. Kilda's Garry Sidebottom. In his comeback match, he was reported again.

Carman moved to North Melbourne in 1982 for his final season as a player. He then retired from the VFL at the age of 32, and captain-coached the Eastlake Football Club in the Australian Capital Territory Football League (ACTAFL), where he was again suspended for manhandling an umpire.

== Coaching career ==
Carman then coached a number of regional clubs in Victoria, including Kangaroo Flat and played at full forward for Sandhurst in 1989, kicking 53 goals. Carman was appointed as captain-coach of Kennington in late 1989, but the club folded prior to the 1990 Bendigo Football League season.

Completely retired from playing, Carman moved back to Adelaide. After failing to get a fitness role with his old club Norwood, Carman went to Sturt junior development officer Robert Oatey and served over the next two seasons as fitness coordinator, Auskick coordinator and assistant to Haydn Bunton Jr.. After Bunton parted with Sturt at the end of 1994, Carman coached the Double Blues from 1995 to 2001. He was instrumental in Sturt's resurgence as a power in the SANFL after a run of wooden spoons from 1989 until his third season in charge. Sturt did not win a game in Carman's first season, but with excellent recruiting he built the team up to win the 1998 minor premiership, only to fail to Port Adelaide in the Grand Final. After a 2001 season affected by a poor injury run and lack of notable recruits, Carman was not reappointed as the club was disappointed at missing the finals for the first time since 1996, and it was felt that other people should have some influence over how the team was run.

== Honours ==
In 2020, Carman was awarded Player/Coach Life Membership of the SANFL.

In June 2025 Carman was awarded life membership of the Sturt Football Club.
