= Simon Feast =

Australian rules footballer

Personal information
- Full name: Simon Feast
- Born: 1 December 1974 (age 51)
- Original team: East Gambier (WBFL)
- Draft: 71st, 1998 National Draft
- Height: 196 cm (6 ft 5 in)
- Weight: 94 kg (207 lb)
- Position: Ruckman

Playing career^{1}
Years	Club	Games (Goals)
1999–2001	Sydney Swans	14 (3)
- ^{1} Playing statistics correct to the end of 2001.

Simon Feast (born 1 December 1974) is a former Australian rules footballer who played with the Sydney Swans in the Australian Football League (AFL) and for much longer with Sturt in the South Australian National Football League (SANFL).

== Early life ==
Born in Port MacDonnell, South Australia, where his father was a fisherman, Feast moved to nearby Mount Gambier, South Australia as an 8-year-old. Despite not coming from a sporting family, at 13 Feast started playing football for East Gambier Football Club in the Western Border Football League. As a latecomer to junior football Feast wasn't the most gifted junior but developed into a promising ruckman. He had a trial at Norwood Football Club but returned home shortly after. Feast went to play football in Darwin in the 1994 off season as a 19-year-old and when he returned home Feast had an offer from Sturt's general manager Ross Tuohy, which he gladly accepted as an opportunity to leave his job at a timber mill.

== Football career ==
Feast began when the Double Blues were at a low ebb – they had suffered six consecutive wooden spoons, and his debut season of 1995 was an unprecedented horror with Sturt losing all 22 games by no fewer than 24 points. Feast, however, won Sturt’s best and fairest award as a rookie, and continued this form as the Double Blues made a remarkable revival over the following three seasons to win sixteen matches in 1998, winning another best and fairest in 1998.

Sydney drafted Feast, a ruckman, from the Double Blues with pick 71 in the National Draft. He made his league debut in round five of the 1999 AFL season, coming into the side for Greg Stafford. In his time at Sydney Feast was never a regular fixture in the team, playing five games in 1999, four in 2000 and five in 2001. Feast played VFL football for Port Melbourne as they were the Swans' reserves side and received the second most votes in the 2001 J. J. Liston Trophy.

After being delisted by Sydney after the 2001 season, Feast returned to Sturt and played in the Double Blues’ first premiership since 1976. He continued to play for Sturt until his retirement in 2008, after 205 games.
