= Tony Russell (footballer) =

Australian rules footballer

Personal information
- Full name: Anthony Russell
- Born: 13 January 1961 (age 65)
- Original team: Hamilton
- Height: 188 cm (6 ft 2 in)
- Weight: 83 kg (183 lb)
- Position: Full-forward

Playing career^{1}
Years	Club	Games (Goals)
1982–1984	Collingwood	8 (17)
1986–1994	South Warrnambool	149 (792)
1996–1998	Koroit	56 (147)
1999–2001	Port Fairy	42 (81)
- ^{1} Playing statistics correct to the end of 2001.

Career highlights
- Preston premiership: 1984; South Warrnambool premierships: 1990, 1991, 1994; HFL leading-goalkicker: 1986, 1987, 1988, 1989, 1990, 1991, 1994; HFL all-time leading goal-kicker: 1020 goals

Anthony Russell (born 13 January 1961) is a former Australian rules footballer who played for Collingwood in the Victorian Football League (VFL). He is also the most prolific forward in the history of the Hampden Football League, with a record 1020 goals.

== Career ==
Originally from Coleraine, Russell was only a teenager when he kicked over 100 goals in a season for Hamilton in the Western Border Football League. At the time, Hamilton was tied in the VFL Country zone to Collingwood.

Russell played seven VFL games in three seasons at Collingwood. He kicked four goals when he made his debut, against Essendon, in the 1982 VFL season, but his best haul came the following year, with six goals, four of them in the final quarter, against the Sydney Swans at Victoria Park.

He crossed to Victorian Football Association club Preston during 1984 and was a member of their premiership team that year. Although he was kept quiet by the Frankston defenders in the grand final, Russell had played a large role in getting them there, with 10 goals in Preston's semi final win over Geelong West.

He left Preston at the end of 1984 and was linked to Williamstown during the pre-season. He finished the 1985 season playing for Cavendish in the South West DFL. In 1986, he signed with Beaufort in the Ballarat FL, but a disagreement with the coach and board led him to request a clearance to South Warrnambool, where he would kick 792 goals, averaging over six a game. He played in three premiership teams and was the Hampden Football League leading goalkicker every season from 1986 to 1991, and then for a seventh time in 1994.

During 1992, Russell was unhappy with the way things were being run at the club, so he decided to seek a clearance to local district club South Rovers in 1993; Russell set a Warrnambool District Football League record with 165 goals in a season. That tally included a 25-goal haul against Merrivale. Lured back to South Warrnambool for the 1994 season, Russell realised the people he had issue with were still there. In 1995, he was lured to Caramut in the Mininera League because of his friendship with Jason Misfud. He kicked 171 goals for Caramut.

In 1996, Misfud was appointed captain-coach of Hampden club Koroit, recruiting Russell to play under him. After three seasons at Koroit, Russell became captain-coach at Port Fairy, where he brought up his 1,000th league goal.

He finished his career playing for the Deakin University sharks in the Warrnambool & District Football League.

Russell, who retired aged 43, is believed to have kicked in excess of 2000 goals over the course of his career and played in 15 grand finals, from which he finished on the premiership-winning team nine times.

He now works in Broome as a prison officer at Broome Regional Prison.
