= Peter Hogan (disambiguation) =

Peter Hogan English writer and comics writer

Peter Hogan may also refer to:

- Peter Hogan (footballer) (1945–2007), Australian former rules footballer
- Peter Hogan (hurler) (born 1997), Irish hurler
- Peter Hogan (sport shooter), Australian sport shooter
