= Imbi =

Imbi may refer to:

== Places ==
- A commercial area near Bukit Bintang, Kuala Lumpur, Malaysia
- Imbi station, monorail station in Bukit Bintang, Kuala Lumpur, Malaysia
- Jalan Imbi, road in Kuala Lumpur

== People ==
- Imbi the Girl (born 1997), Australian singer-songwriter, rapper and poet
- Imbi Hoop (born 1988), Estonian footballer
- Imbi Paju (born 1959), Estonian-Finnish author, journalist and filmmaker
- Imbi-Camille Tamm, better known as Camille, Estonian violinist
- Winis Imbi (born 1979), Papua New Guinea-born Australian rules footballer

== Other ==
- Elachista imbi, a moth
