= Kevin Huppatz =

Australian rules footballer

Personal information
- Full name: Kevin Huppatz
- Born: 31 March 1945
- Original team: Portland
- Height: 178 cm (5 ft 10 in)
- Weight: 73 kg (161 lb)

Playing career^{1}
Years	Club	Games (Goals)
1965	Collingwood	1 (0)
- ^{1} Playing statistics correct to the end of 1965.

Kevin Huppatz is a former Australian rules footballer who played with Collingwood in the Victorian Football League (VFL).
