= Nathan Chapman (footballer) =

Australian rules footballer

Personal information
- Full name: Nathan Chapman
- Born: 7 May 1975 (age 51)
- Original team: Kangaroo Flat (BFL)
- Height: 189 cm (6 ft 2 in)
- Weight: 83 kg (183 lb)

Playing career^{1}
Years	Club	Games (Goals)
1993–1996	Brisbane Bears	49 (12)
1997	Brisbane Lions	11 (1)
1998–2000	Hawthorn	16 (4)
Total		76 (17)
- ^{1} Playing statistics correct to the end of 2000.

Career highlights
- AFL Rising Star nominee: 1993

Nathan Chapman (born 7 May 1975) is a former Australian rules footballer who had a short career in the Australian Football League before a brief stint as an American football punter. At the time, he was one of a few Australians to be contracted at the top level in both the AFL and NFL.

Chapman was selected in the 1992 AFL draft at pick 2 by the struggling Brisbane Bears, from Kangaroo Flat. The Bears outfit, short of key defenders used the lightly built 188 cm tall Chapman at full back against many of the game's power forwards in his first few seasons. Having been occasionally humiliated in key positions and taking some time to bulk up his body, Chapman was often tried in the forward line with some success.

After injury and inconsistent form, Chapman was traded in 1997 to the Hawthorn Hawks having played just 49 games for the Bears and 11 with the Lions. Injury again struck and Chapman was relegated to the Victorian Football League affiliate before being eventually delisted in 2000 having played only 16 senior games with the Hawks.

In 2004, a few years after being delisted by the Hawks, and after many months of practice, Chapman went to the United States, where he was signed by the Green Bay Packers as a free agent. Chapman played in 3 pre-season games for Green Bay, at one point out-punting one of the team's rookies. Chapman also spent time at the rookie and senior minicamps of the Chicago Bears.

Chapman is director and head punting coach of Prokick Australia with ex-NFL and CFL free agent placekicker John A. Smith. ProKick Australia is an American football punting and placekicking school in Australia which trains and assesses Australians to the standard required for NCAA, NFL and CFL punting and placekicking positions.

In 2019 he worked as a specialist skills coach with Richmond's VFLW team and from 2020 he has served in the same role with the club's senior women's side in the AFL Women's competition.
