= Matthew Clarke (Australian footballer) =

Australian rules footballer, born 1973

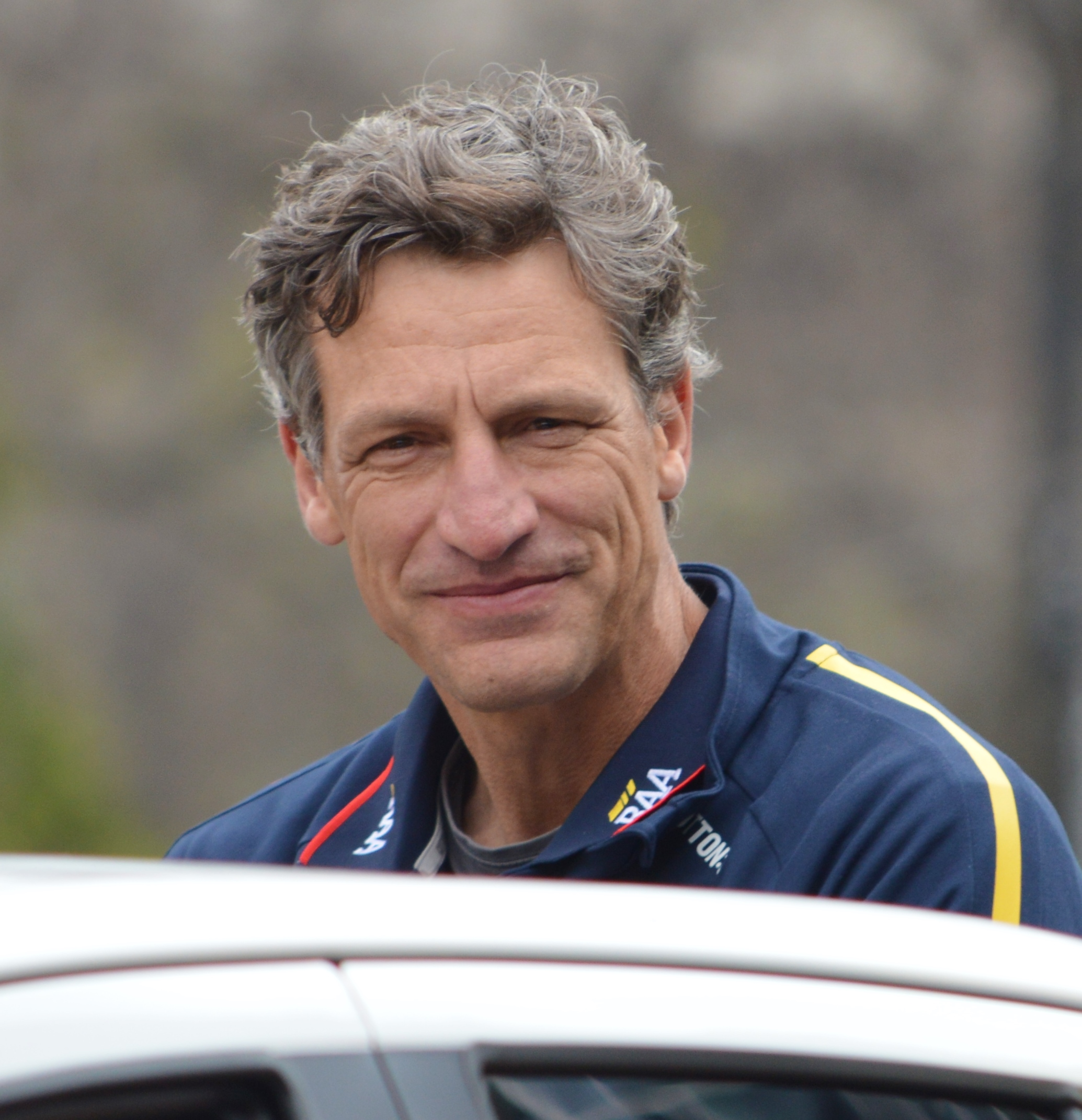
- Clarke in the 2019 AFL Grand Final Parade

Personal information
- Full name: Matthew Clarke
- Nickname: Doc
- Born: 18 September 1973 (age 53); Camden, New South Wales
- Original team: West Gambier
- Draft: 56th overall, 1990 AFL draft 43rd overall, 1992 Pre-Season Draft; 7th overall, 2006 Pre-Season Draft
- Height: 200 cm (6 ft 7 in)
- Weight: 100 kg (220 lb)
- Position: Ruck

Playing career^{1}
Years	Club	Games (Goals)
1991–1992	Richmond	0 (0)
1993–1996	Brisbane Bears	69 (6)
1997–1999	Brisbane Lions	61 (13)
2000–2006	Adelaide	118 (19)
2007	St Kilda	10 (0)
Total		258 (38)

Representative team honours
Years	Team	Games (Goals)
	South Australia	4 (0)

Coaching career^{3}
Years	Club	Games (W–L–D)
2019–2025	Adelaide (W)	92 (65–27–0)
- ^{1} Playing statistics correct to the end of 2007.^{3} Coaching statistics correct as of 2025.

Career highlights
- Merrett–Murray Medal: 1997; AFL Rising Star nominee: 1994; 2× AFLW premiership coach: 2019, 2022 (S6)

Matthew Clarke (born 18 September 1973) is a former professional Australian rules football player and current coach who was most recently the head coach of Adelaide in the AFL Women's. Prior to coaching, he played in the Australian Football League (AFL), his career spanning four clubs and a total of 258 games between 1993 and 2007. He was known as one of the most effective tap ruckmen of his era.

== Early life ==
Clarke was born in Camden, New South Wales to Rex and Eve Clarke and was the eldest of three children (Gavin and Susan). At six months his family moved to the United States where Clarke would live until the age of 2 and a half. Clarke then moved to Mount Gambier, South Australia where his father would work as a vet.

He was a talented junior footballer and basketballer, playing for the SA Country under 16s. In 1989–90 at 15 he would go on to play for the local semi-pro basketball team the Mount Gambier Pioneers in the South East Australian Basketball League. Clarke managed 15 games in two seasons for the Pioneers.

Clarke played football for West Gambier in the Western Border Football League and quickly rose through the ranks to play 6 senior games in 1990 as a 16-year-old. Clarke would be drafted by the Richmond Football Club at pick 56 overall in the 1990 AFL draft. He joined Mount Gambier local Nick Daffy at Richmond as the only South Australians in the 1990 draft due to the Adelaide Crows joining the AFL and having exclusivity to South Australians. Richmond avoided this rule as the two played in the WBFL which was as affiliated with the VCFL due to the Victorian teams in the league.

== Playing career ==
=== Richmond ===
In 1991 as a 17-year-old Clarke spent the year playing for the Richmond Under 19s whilst studying science at Melbourne University. Richmond U19s won the first 11 games of the season but after a late season slump they were eliminated in the Semi Final. Clarke played 20 out of 23 possible games and finished runner up in the best and fairest to Duncan Kellaway.

However, Clarke was delisted by Richmond at the end of 1991 when the AFL u19s competition was abolished. Clarke was given another chance at AFL football and was picked up by the Brisbane Bears at pick 43 in the 1992 AFL Pre-Season Draft

=== Brisbane Bears/Lions ===
In 1992 Clarke wanted a season in Adelaide despite being drafted by Brisbane. He played for South Adelaide Football Club in the SANFL whilst studying science at The University of Adelaide. After playing the first six games in the reserves Clarke would become a senior regular and finished 6th in the best and fairest.

Clarke made his debut with the Bears in 1993. Under coach Robert Walls, he was regarded as a developing Ruckman, with his tap work noted in contemporary assessments.

After being runner up in the Brisbane Bears Club Champion award in 1994 and 1996, he took out the Merrett–Murray best and fairest award in 1997 for the Brisbane Lions and consolidated his position as one of the league's best ruckmen.

=== Adelaide playing career ===
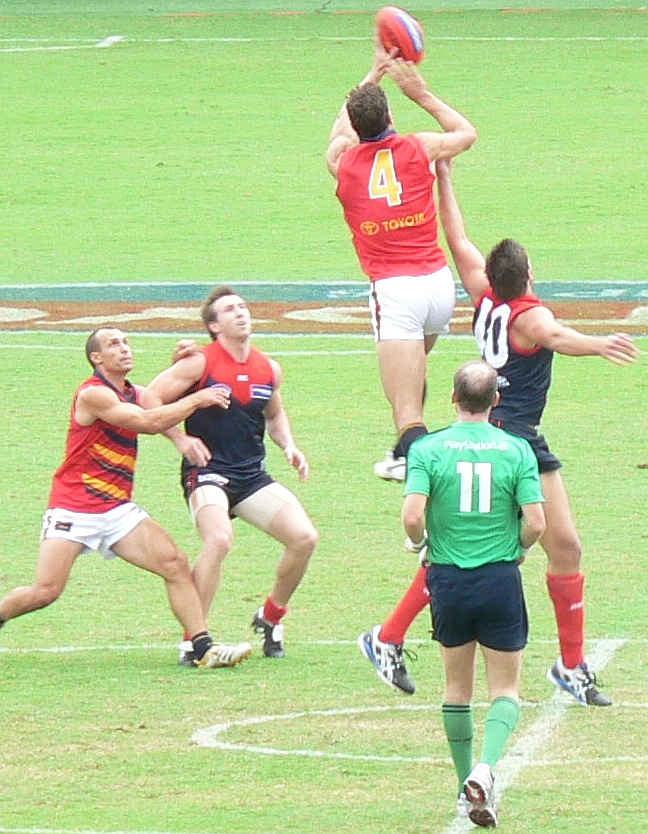
Clarke wins a ruck contest at a ball-up stoppage for Adelaide against Melbourne.

Clarke moved to the Crows in 2000.

In 2005 in the absence of suddenly emerged number one ruckman Ben Hudson, Clarke was surprisingly recalled from the South Adelaide side in the South Australian National Football League (SANFL) to play a part in the Crows' run to the finals. He showed he was still an effective player, being labelled as one of the most effective "tap ruckmen" by commentator Robert Walls.

He played on during 2006, with 18 games, and after ruckman Rhett Biglands had an anterior cruciate ligament injury in the Crows' last game of 2006 (sidelining him for most if not all of the 2007 season), there was talk that Clarke may continue for another season. However, he retired from football at the end of the 2006 season after an AFL career of 248 games over 13 seasons.

=== Return to football – St Kilda ===
There had been some speculation in December 2006 that Clarke may be drafted by St Kilda Football Club for the 2007 season, and although this was initially denied, on 12 December 2006, he was taken by the Saints with their selection in the 2007 Pre Season Draft.

Clarke signed on with the club for one season only, but trained strongly over the pre season and was selected for the first game.

He performed strongly as the side's primary ruckman, displaying his usual ruckwork dexterity.

In September 2007, Clarke announced his retirement.

== Coaching career ==
After retiring from playing, Clarke rejoined Adelaide Football Club as a ruck coach, and later as a midfield development coach.

On 23 May 2018, Clarke was announced as Adelaide's AFL Women's head coach from the 2019 season onwards. In his first season as coach, the Adelaide Crows won the 2019 AFLW premiership. Clarke coached a second premiership in 2022 season 6. In 2024, Clarke was awarded with an Adelaide Football Club Life Membership, commemorating his time as a player and his commitment and success within the AFL Women's program. It follows his AFL Life Membership awarded in 2021.

Prior to the 2025 AFL Women's season, it was announced that following the Crows' 2025 campaign, Clarke would step down from the role of senior coach. He departed the club following Adelaide's 11-point loss to Melbourne in the semi-finals.

== Other ==
Clarke is a qualified veterinarian (like his father) and has completed an MBA from the University of South Australia.

Clarke is married to Adelaide radio personality Ali Clarke. They have three children, Eloise Harper, Samuel Fletcher and Madeline.
