= Michael Horsburgh =

Australian rules footballer

Personal information
- Born: 15 January 1958 (age 68)
- Original team: Coleraine
- Height: 197 cm (6 ft 6 in)
- Weight: 97 kg (214 lb)

Playing career^{1}
Years	Club	Games (Goals)
1980	Collingwood	4 (1)
- ^{1} Playing statistics correct to the end of 1980.

Michael Horsburgh (born 15 January 1958) is a former Australian rules footballer who played with Collingwood in the Victorian Football League (VFL).

Horsburgh, a ruckman, played originally for Coleraine in the Western Border Football League (WBFL). In 1978 he finished second, on countback, in the league's best and fairest, but was retrospectively awarded the medal 24 years later. He made four appearances for Collingwood, early in the 1980 VFL season, then he returned to the WBFL, as playing coach of Casterton.
