= Alan Byron =

Australian rules footballer

Personal information
- Full name: Alan Byron
- Born: 8 October 1936
- Died: 11 March 1982 (aged 45)
- Original team: Portland
- Height: 185 cm (6 ft 1 in)
- Weight: 83 kg (183 lb)

Playing career^{1}
Years	Club	Games (Goals)
1957–1958, 1960	Geelong	25 (3)
- ^{1} Playing statistics correct to the end of 1960.

Alan Byron (8 October 1936 – 11 March 1982) was an Australian rules footballer who played for the Geelong Football Club in the Victorian Football League (VFL).
