= David Mitchell =

David or Dave Mitchell may refer to:

== Entertainment ==
- David Mitchell (author) (born 1969), English novelist
- David Mitchell (comedian) (born 1974), British actor and comedian
- David Mitchell (Irish actor) (born 1973), Irish actor
- David Mitchell (New Zealand poet) (1940–2011), New Zealand poet
- David Robert Mitchell (born 1974), American film director
- David V. Mitchell (1943–2023), American editor and publisher
- Dave B. Mitchell (born 1969), American voice actor and musician

== Politics ==
- David Mitchell (politician) (1928–2014), British Conservative member of parliament
- David Brydie Mitchell (1760–1837), governor of Georgia (U.S.)

== Sports ==
=== Football ===
- David Mitchell (Australian rules footballer) (born 1964), former Australian rules footballer
- David Mitchell (footballer, born 1866) (1866–1948), Scottish international football player
- David Mitchell (footballer, born 1945) (1945–2020), English football player
- David Mitchell (footballer, born 1990), Scottish football goalkeeper (Stranraer, Dundee)
- Dave Mitchell (soccer) (born 1962), Scottish-born Australian footballer and coach

=== Other sports ===
- David Mitchell (canoeist) (born 1943), former British slalom canoeist
- David Mitchell (cricketer) (born 1980), English cricketer
- David Mitchell (field hockey) (born 1981), Scottish field hockey defender
- David Mitchell (fighter) (born 1979), American mixed martial artist
- David Mitchell (figure skater) (born 1982), American ice dancer
- David Mitchell (lacrosse) (born 1984), Canadian lacrosse player

== Other people ==
- David Mitchell (architect) (1941–2018), New Zealand architect
- David Mitchell (builder) (1829–1916), Scottish-Australian builder
- David Mitchell (lawyer) (1934–2018), Australian Presbyterian minister and former solicitor-general of Lesotho
- David Mitchell (murderer) (1972–2000), Bahamian murderer executed for his crimes
- David Mitchell (Royal Navy officer) (c. 1650–1710), Scottish admiral
- David B. Mitchell (police officer) (born 1950), American police chief from Maryland and Delaware
- David D. Mitchell (1806–1861), American fur trader and regional superintendent of Indian Affairs
- David E. Mitchell (1950–2026), American business executive and drug price advocate
- David J. Mitchell (born 1954), Canadian historian
- David Scott Mitchell (1836–1907), Australian founder of the Mitchell Library in Sydney Australia
- David William Mitchell (1813–1859), English zoologist and illustrator
- David Mitchell, British murderer who received a whole life order

== Other uses ==
- David Mitchell (pilot boat), a 19th-century Sandy Hook pilot boat

== See also ==
- David Mitchel (c. 1591–1663), Scottish bishop
