= Graeme Robertson (Australian footballer) =

Australian rules footballer

Personal information
- Full name: Graeme Lindsay Robertson
- Born: 25 September 1952 (age 74)
- Original team: Kangaroo Flat (GCFL)
- Height: 197 cm (6 ft 6 in)
- Weight: 86 kg (190 lb)
- Position: Ruck

Playing career^{1}
Years	Club	Games (Goals)
1974–1975	Carlton	9 (2)
1976–77 & 1979-1981	Richmond	51 (1)
1978	West Adelaide	16 (0)
1982-1984	Port Adelaide	25 (1)
Total		101 (4)
- ^{1} Playing statistics correct to the end of 1984.

Graeme Robertson (born 25 September 1952) is a former Australian rules footballer who played with Carlton and Richmond in the Victorian Football League (VFL) and Port Adelaide Football Club and West Adelaide in the South Australian National Football League (SANFL).
