= South Gambier Football Club =

South Gambier

Names
- Full name: South Gambier Football & Netball Club
- Nickname: Demons

Club details
- Founded: 1926; 100 years ago
- Colours: red white
- Competition: Limestone Coast Football League
- President: Leigh Winterfield
- Premierships: 16
- Ground: Blue Lake Sports Park, Mt Gambier

Uniforms
Home

The South Gambier Football & Netball Club is an Australian rules football and netball club from Mount Gambier, South Australia. They are currently competing in the Limestone Coast Football League.

== History ==
The South Gambier Football Club (firstly known as the South Mount Gambier Football Club) was formed in 1926 with the establishment of the South Eastern Football Association. The club made the grand final of the first season, but lost to Naracoorte. The club met the same team in the 1927 premiership, however this time they prevailed by 32 points.

In 1938 the club made the move to the Mid South East Football Association, however the following season was abandoned due to WWII. Following the war, the club reformed and joined the newly-formed Mount Gambier and District Football Association in 1946. South Gambier won premierships in both 1949 and 1951 before the league was renamed the South-East & Border Football League, which it remained in until the establishment of the Western Border Football League in 1964 (after a merger with the Western District Football League).

South Gambier made its first appearance in a grand final in the WBFL in 1970, losing to Hamilton by 80 points. The Demons first WBFL premiership win was recorded in 1974, beating East Gambier by 34 points. The club continued to make regular premiership appearances, winning in 1992, 1994, 1996-7-8-9-2000, 2002, 2005, 2009, and finally in 2015.

== Premierships ==
League	Total flags	Premiership years
South Eastern Football Association	2	1927, 1933
Mount Gambier and Districts Football Association	2	1949, 1951
Western Border Football League	12	1974, 1992, 1994, 1996, 1997, 1998, 1999, 2000, 2002, 2005, 2009, 2015

== Notable Sportspeople ==
=== WBFL Medalists ===
- B Smith (1971)
- L Bell (1986)
- R Elliot (1992)
- M Ryan (1996)
- B Howard (2004)
- J Copping (2006)
- S Berkefeld (2011)

== Entertainment ==
On 3 January 1976, the South Gambier Football Club was the host to Australian rock band AC/DC. The band played a setlist of nine songs for their first of two concerts in 1976 in Mount Gambier.

== See also ==
- Limestone Coast Football League
- North Gambier Football Club
- East Gambier Football Club
- Mount Gambier
