= North Gambier Football Club =

North Gambier

Names
- Full name: North Gambier Football Club
- Nickname: Tigers

Club details
- Founded: 1926; 100 years ago
- Colours: black gold
- Competition: Limestone Coast Football League
- Chairperson: Tony Kelly
- Coach: Justin McConnell
- Premierships: 17
- Ground: Vansittart Park, Mt Gambier

Uniforms
Home

The North Gambier Football and Netball Club is an Australian rules football and netball club currently competing in the Limestone Coast Football League. Since the creation of this league, North Gambier have won eight senior premierships.

== History ==
The North Gambier Football Club was first created (and shortly known as the 'North Mount Gambier Football Club') in 1926 with the establishment of the South Eastern Football Association which included Narracoorte, Penola, and South Mount Gambier. During North Gambier's twelve seasons in this league it played in four grand finals, winning those of 1928 and 1929. In 1934, the club threatened to withdraw from the league unless all the finals matches for the year were played at North Gambier. This followed none of the finals matches being played at Mount Gambier during the 1933 finals. Between 1938 and 1945 the club went into recess, partly due to the outbreak of WWII.

In 1946, North Gambier were a founding club of the Mount Gambier & District Football League. The club won three back-to-back premierships in 1946-7-8 before the league was renamed the South-East & Border Football League in 1950. North Gambier went on to win a further the back-to-back premierships in this league (1960-1-2).

In 1964, after almost a decade of discussions, the Western District Football League in Victoria and the South-East & Border Football League in South Australia merged to form the Western Border Football League, now known as the Limestone Coast Football League. North Gambier were one of the twelve establishing teams. The club has remained in this league, winning a total of seven premierships across six decades. This included the very first season of the league, beating Heywood by 19 points in 1964. The Western District Football League would be renamed to the Limestone Coast Football League in 2023.

== Premierships ==
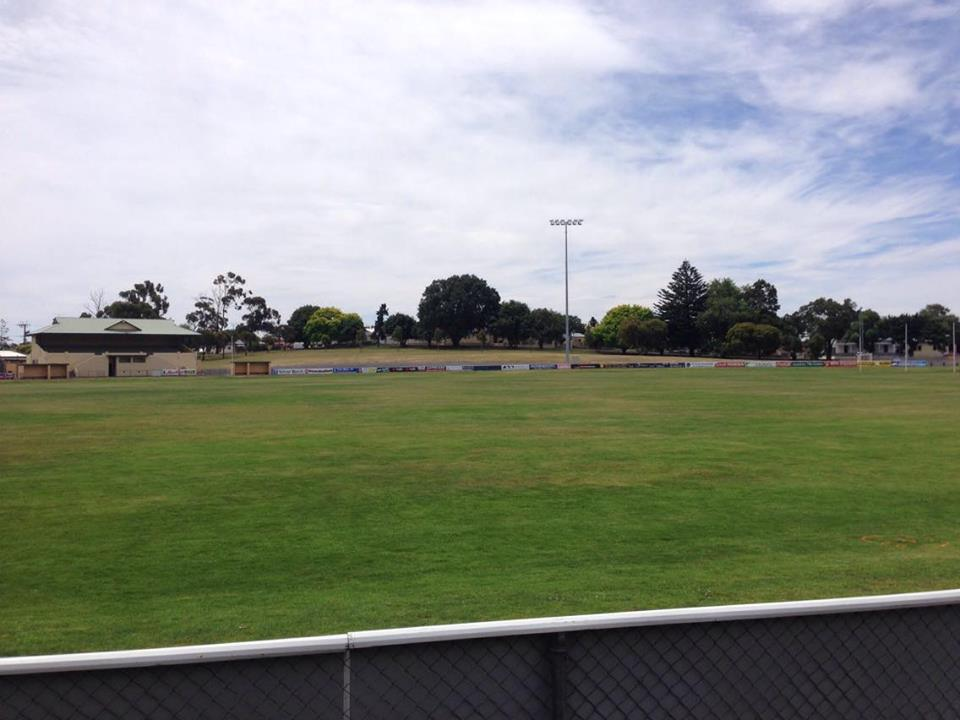
Vansittart Park, home of the North Gambier FC

League	Total flags	Premiership years
South Eastern Football Association	2	1928, 1929
Mount Gambier & District Football League	3	1946, 1947, 1948
South-East & Border Football League	3	1960, 1961, 1962
Western Border Football League	9	1964, 1979, 1987, 1989, 2012, 2013, 2014, 2016, 2019

== Notable sportspeople ==
=== WBFL/LCFL Medalists ===
- G Curnow (1977)
- W Fletcher (1984)
- D Wright (1987)
- Scott Flett (2002, 2005)
- Justin McConnell (2010)
- Richard O'Grady (2012, 2014)
- Declan Carmody (2017)
- Michael Telford (2019)

=== AFL players ===
- Nick Daffy (1991-2002)
- Bradley Close (2020-)

== See also ==
- Limestone Coast Football League
- South Gambier Football Club
- East Gambier Football Club
- Mount Gambier, South Australia
