= Nick Daffy =

Australian rules footballer (born 1973)

Personal information
- Born: 11 May 1973 (age 53)
- Original team: North Gambier / Glenelg Under 19s
- Debut: Round 2, 28 March 1992, Richmond vs. North Melbourne, at Waverley Park
- Height: 183 cm (6 ft 0 in)
- Weight: 85 kg (187 lb)

Playing career^{1}
Years	Club	Games (Goals)
1991–2001	Richmond	165 (181)
2002	Sydney	1 (1)
Total		166 (182)
- ^{1} Playing statistics correct to the end of 2002.

Career highlights
- Richmond Best and Fairest 1998; Richmond Leading Goalkicker 1995

Nick Daffy (born 11 May 1973) is a former Australian rules football player who played in the AFL between 1992 and 2001 for the Richmond Football Club and then played one game in 2002 for the Sydney Swans Football Club.

== Early life ==
Daffy grew up in Mount Gambier and started playing football for North Gambier Football Club in the under 10s. He showed talent from an early age and represented South Australia in the Under/13 Schoolboys football side, plus won the North Gambier Best & Fairest in U/14 and U/16. He would debut for the North Gambier senior team in 1990 as a 16-year-old and would win the Western Border Football League Rookie of The Year Award. In 1990, he also played 9 games for Glenelg thirds and represented South Australia in the Teal Cup. He would also go back to North Gambier and was a part of the 1990 U/18 premiership.

== Richmond ==
Daffy was selected at pick 49 in the 1990 AFL draft by Richmond and would join fellow Mt Gambier local Matthew Clarke who was selected with Richmond's next pick, 56. Daffy and Clarke were the only South Australians selected in the draft due to Adelaide Crows joining the AFL and having exclusivity to South Australians. Richmond skirted this rule as these two played in the Western Border Football League which was affiliated with the VCFL due to the Victorian teams in the league.

=== 1991 ===
In 1991, Daffy, as a 17-year-old, played 6 games and kicked 3 goals for Richmond’s under 19s during the final season of that competition. He wore number 6 as Richmond finished 6th and lost in the Semi-Final to Collingwood. He also played some games for North Gambier during the season.

=== 1992 ===
Daffy made his AFL debut in round 2 vs North Melbourne as an 18-year-old in number 44. He would get 10 disposals in a loss and would play the next 3 games before being dropped to Richmond's reserves. He played the remainder of the season in the reserves and kicked 13 goals in a lowly Richmond side.

=== 1993 ===
1993 would be another year Daffy could not cement his place in the Richmond side, he started the season playing reserves until round 11 but could only amass 8 disposals against Fitzroy and was dropped. Daffy was in the best for the reserves in round 12 and 13 and found his way back in the AFL from round 14 to 17 before being dropped again. He once again completed the rest of the season in the reserves, kicking 8 goals for the season. The reserves finished second on the ladder however lost in the Qualifying Final to Melbourne , Daffy placed 4th in the reserves best and fairest.

=== 1994 ===
1994 was the year Daffy could cement his place in the team as a goal-sneak half-forward whose trademark was to snap seemingly impossible goals. He started the season in the reserves but was in the team for round 5; he played every game of the season apart from one. He averaged 10 disposals and kicked 15 goals for the season.

=== 1995 ===
As a 21-year-old in 1995, Daffy was given the number 10 and played 23 games, only missing two games due to suspension for striking Fitzroy's Jeff Bruce. It was a breakout season for Daffy, playing as a medium-sized forward, averaging 14 disposals, and winning Richmond’s leading goalkicker award in its 1995 preliminary final season, with 45 goals. 1995 was one of two years between 1994 and 2008 in which Matthew Richardson did not lead Richmond's goalkicking, as he was suffering from an ACL injury. Daffy kicked a career-high 6 goals vs North Melbourne in round 4 and gained selection in the South Australian State of Origin team in 1995.

=== 1996 ===
In 1996, he was described by Michael Malthouse as the best medium-sized small forward in the AFL. Daffy averaged 17 disposals but kicked 28 goals from 18 games due to missing four games with a broken left hand towards the end of the season. He finished equal 10th in the Richmond best and fairest and got 6 Brownlow Medal votes.

=== 1997 ===
Daffy played all 22 games in 1997, averaged 15 disposals and kicked 26 goals. He finished 6th in Richmond's best and fairest.

=== 1998 ===
Daffy, now aged 24, increased his importance to the Richmond side when he eventually moved into a midfield role. With his pace, ability to create space, and long kicking, Daffy became a key member of the Tigers’ midfield. In 1998, Daffy produced his best season in the AFL—he averaged 23.6 disposals per game, was ranked third in the whole competition for total kicks, kicked 30 goals as a midfielder, and capped a fine season by winning the Jack Dyer Medal. Surprisingly, Daffy only amassed 9 Brownlow votes.

=== 1999 ===
Daffy backed it up with another strong season in 1999, playing all 22 games, averaging 22.8 disposals per match and scoring 18 goals. He had a career-high 36 disposals vs Adelaide in round 9, finished 3rd in the best and fairest and got 10 votes in the Brownlow.

=== 2000 ===
In 2000 Daffy’s form was up and down—even though he played all but one game, in which he was suspended for an off-field incident. His average disposals dropped to 19.9 and he kicked 14 goals. He was awarded 6 Brownlow votes but did not place in the top 10 of Richmond's best and fairest.

=== 2001 ===
Despite playing 87 out of a possible 88 games in the previous four seasons, 2001 was an injury-plagued season for Daffy. He only played 10 games including the Semi-Final against Carlton in which he sat on the bench and didn't even amass a single disposal or tackle. He was not selected in the Preliminary Final the following week and was replaced by a fellow Limestone Coast local Aaron Fiora. Daffy was to be traded to Sydney at age 28, which is typically the prime of a footballers career. Nick Daffy, at the peak of his powers, had been a damaging player for Richmond, both as a goalkicking forward and ball-magnet midfielder. Daffy was traded to Sydney for Greg Stafford and pick #17, which would subsequently be traded back and forth until it was used by Geelong to select James Kelly in the 2001 draft. Stafford would play 74 games for Richmond, while James Kelly was a key player in 3 premierships for Geelong.

=== 2002 ===
Nick Daffy played his first game for Sydney in round 2 vs Carlton, getting 5 disposals and 1 goal. This was his last game in the AFL; he retired November 1, 2002, aged 29.

== Post-AFL Career ==
He is now a prominent Melbourne restaurateur, with a flagship restaurant at Melbourne Docklands.
