= Michael Edmonds (footballer) =

Australian rules footballer

Personal information
- Full name: Michael Edmonds
- Born: 13 November 1966 (age 59)
- Original teams: Hamilton Imperials, (Western Border FL)

Playing career^{1}
Years	Club	Games (Goals)
1986	Collingwood	2 (1)
- ^{1} Playing statistics correct to the end of 1986.

Michael "Mick" Edmonds (born 13 November 1966) is a former Australian rules footballer who played for Collingwood in the Victorian Football League (VFL) and Norwood and West Torrens Football Clubs in the South Australian National Football League (SANFL).

Recruited from the Hamilton Imperials in the Western Border Football League (WBFL), Edmonds made two appearances for Collingwood in the 1986 VFL season before heading to South Australia to play for Norwood and West Torrens. Following the end of his playing career, Edmonds returned to coach Hamilton.

== Sources ==
- McNicol, A. "Old rivals' Roo era", The Sunday Age, Sport, p. 12, 7 April 2013.
