= Kangaroo Flat Football Club =

Australian rules football and netball club

Kangaroo Flat

Names
- Full name: Kangaroo Flat Football & Netball Club
- Nickname(s): Kangaroos

2018 season

Club details
- Founded: 1890; 135 years ago
- Colours: Green White
- Competition: BFL
- Premierships: BFL (1): 1996
- Ground(s): Dower Park

Uniforms
Home

The Kangaroo Flat Football Netball Club is an Australian rules football and netball club based in the Bendigo suburb of Kangaroo Flat, Victoria.

The club teams currently compete in the Bendigo Football Netball League. The club spent much of the twentieth century in the Bendigo Football Association, and were premiers in 1923, 1926, 1948 and 1955. Their sole premiership win in the Bendigo Football League was in 1996.

== History ==
In 1862 a football club was formed, originally known as "Kangaroo Football Club" based out of the Kangaroo Flat Cricket Ground and later renamed "Kangaroo Flat". Few records exist of the club in the 1860s and 1870s however public records of its activity exist in 1863, 1873, in 1882 as part of the Sandhurst Football Association and between 1884 and 1886. In 1885, the club fielded a juniors team which competed against Golden Square. In 1886 it reported a strong financial result and a successful senior season of 14 matches with 9 wins. The club resolved to join the junior football association and to advertise future annual meetings. However few public records exist of teams or matches from the Sandhurst Junior Football Association which formed in 1887 apart from the occasional representative match against other competitions. It is possible that it spent the next 3 years in this competition. On the 23rd April 1890, the club advertised a meeting at Gunn's Hotel which coincided with a meeting of the Bendigo District Football Association at the Courthouse hotel. It is possible that the club reformed its senior side with an intention to compete in said competition. If so that would make it one of the oldest football clubs.

According to Horsfall (1993) the club was formed in 1890. It is suggested that the club colours, emerald green and white, were chosen as a result of the many Welshmen who played in the club in its early years, who wished to remember their own colours of Wales. Following World War I, the club's uniform colours changed to a navy blue jumper with a white kangaroo. The colours reverted to green and white shortly after.

The club's most successful era was the 1920s, being premiers in 1923 and, undefeated, in 1926. They also played in the grand finals of 1927 and 1929, losing by a narrow margin. Following World War II, the club was reformed in 1946. In 1947, the club made the finals, and the following year, were undefeated premiers. They were also premiers in 1955, defeating North Bendigo by thirty points.

They joined the Golden City Football League (GCFL) in 1960 and won a premiership in their first season, with a seven-point grand final win over White Hills. The GCFL merged with the Bendigo Football League before the 1981 season to form the Bendigo-Golden City Football League, and Kangaroo Flat were admitted into the second division. Kangaroo Flat has the record of being the oldest established football club from the Golden City Football League to have been incorporated into the Bendigo Football League.

The club was promoted to the first division in 1982, and the following year, the name of the competition was reverted to the Bendigo Football League. In 1985, the club reached the final five, but lost the elimination final to Golden Square. They also finished fourth in 1990 and fifth in 1992.

Kangaroos Flat were BFL premiers for the first and only time in 1996 when they defeated Kyneton 18.18.126 to 15.20.110. The club also made the grand final in 2000 but lost to Castlemaine by 12 points, despite having three more scoring shots.

The club has been described as "the complete football team" and "arguably the best to have played" in the Bendigo Football Association.

Their home ground is Dower Park.

== Other teams ==
=== Juniors ===
In 1976, the Kangaroo Flat Junior Football Club under 12s won the premiership of 1976.

=== Reserves ===
Both the Kangaroo Flat reserves team and the second reserves team won the premiership on 1979. From 1981 to 1983, the regular reserves them won the premiership three times.

== Premierships ==
- Bendigo Football League (1): 1996

== Notable players ==
- Phil Carman (Collingwood Best and Fairest winner who was playing coach of Kangaroo Flat in 1985)
- Nathan Chapman (Brisbane Bears, Brisbane Lions and Hawthorn player who was recruited from Kangaroo Flat)
- Brett Gloury
- Graeme Robertson (Carlton and Richmond player who was recruited from Kangaroo Flat)
- Ty Zantuck (Essendon and Richmond defender who played with Kangaroo Flat in 2007)
- Peter Hinch (Golden Square, Carlton and Geelong West VFA player who coached Kangaroo Flat's reserves team in their triple premiership victory from 1981. Also former player in the Kangaroo Flat junior team)
- Richard Foster a Kanagroo Flat junior who played with Carlton U/19's from 1984 to 1985, and their Reserves team from 1985 to 1987. He was a member of Carlton's 1987 Reserves premiership team. He transferred to Port Adelaide in the SANFL where he played he 145 games and kicked 32 goals. He was a member of Port Adelaide premierships in 1988, 1990, 1992 and 1995.
