= Ian Hampshire =

Australian rules footballer and coach

Personal information
- Full name: Ian James Hampshire
- Nickname: Bluey
- Born: 9 May 1948
- Died: 2 September 2018 (aged 70)
- Original team: Portland
- Height: 196 cm (6 ft 5 in)
- Weight: 104 kg (229 lb)

Playing career^{1}
Years	Club	Games (Goals)
1968–1975	Geelong	113 (22)
1976–1982	Footscray	111 (73)
Total		224 (95)

Coaching career
Years	Club	Games (W–L–D)
1982–1983	Footscray	33 (12–21–0)
- ^{1} Playing statistics correct to the end of 1982.

Ian James "Bluey" Hampshire (9 May 1948 – 2 September 2018) was an Australian rules footballer who played for Geelong and Footscray. He played as a ruckman.

Recruited from Portland to Geelong, Hampshire made his VFL debut in 1968 and played with the club for eight seasons. He moved to Footscray in 1976 where he acted as a secondary ruckman to Gary Dempsey. Dempsey left the club three seasons later and Hampshire became Footscray's first choice in the ruck, finishing second in the club's best and fairest. In 1981 he was selected to represent Victoria.

In round 20, 1981, against Fitzroy (Hampshire's 100th game for Footscray and 13 weeks after his 200th career game) he became the first VFL/AFL player to play 100 games at two clubs.

Hampshire represented Victoria on one occasion, against Tasmania at North Hobart Oval on 4 July 1981 (Vic 31.20.206 def Tas 16.12.108).

During the 1982 VFL season, Footscray coach Royce Hart left the club and Hampshire was given the role of coach. He retired as a player and coached the club until the end of the following season when they finished 7th. He maintained his plumbing business in Geelong while playing and coaching at Footscray.

He and his wife Jan had a son and a daughter. He suffered severe strokes in 2006 and 2014 that affected his mobility.
