= Denis Zeunert =

Australian rules footballer

Personal information
- Full name: Denis Zeunert
- Born: 12 July 1931; Hamilton, Victoria
- Died: 13 February 2009 (aged 77); Geelong, Victoria
- Original team: Heywood
- Height: 180 cm (5 ft 11 in)
- Weight: 81 kg (179 lb)

Playing career^{1}
Years	Club	Games (Goals)
1954–1960	Carlton	110 (11)
- ^{1} Playing statistics correct to the end of 1960.

Denis Zeunert (12 July 1931 – 13 February 2009) was an Australian rules footballer who played with Carlton in the Victorian Football League (VFL). He run second in Carltons best and fairest twice. Playing on the half back flank, he combined with Peter Webster and John James to make a back line. John Nicholls once wrote that Zeunert would always do his circle work on the boundary, allowing him to cover plenty of ground. After his VFL career, he went on to coach the Hamilton Imperials in the Western District League.

== Sources ==
- Holmesby, Russell & Main, Jim (2007). The Encyclopedia of AFL Footballers. 7th ed. Melbourne: Bas Publishing.
