= Winis Imbi =

Australian rules footballer (born 1979)

Winis Imbi (born 26 April 1979 in Papua New Guinea) is an Australian rules footballer. He is 172cm in height.

Imbi was named in the 1997 TAC Cup team of the year before training with Essendon in 1998. In 1999, Imbi was promoted to the Essendon rookie list and played some promising games in the Bombers' Ansett Cup finals campaign. That year he won the Essendon Football Club reserves best and fairest. At the end of the season, he was delisted and added to the Kangaroos Football Club's rookie list where he lasted until the end of the year.

Imbi holds the North Ballarat Rebels games record with 53 games.

He played football in Aberfeldie, Victoria in 2002.

He continues to play football semi-professionally for the Portland Football Club in the Western Border Football League, where he was joint winner of the league's best and fairest in 2003.

His younger brother, James Imbi, began at the Portland Football Club before trying out with the Sturt Football Club in the South Australian National Football League in 2004, after which he went to the Palmerston Football Club in the Northern Territory Football League in 2006.
