= Hamilton Kangaroos Football Club =

Hamilton

Names
- Full name: Hamilton Kangaroos Football Netball Club Inc
- Nickname: Kangaroos

Club details
- Founded: 2012; 14 years ago
- Colours
- Competition: Hampden FNL
- Ground: Melville Oval

Uniforms
Home

The Hamilton Kangaroos Football Netball Club is an Australian rules football and netball club which based in the city of Hamilton in south-western Victoria. The club teams currently compete in the Hampden Football League.

== History ==
The club was formed by merging the Hamilton Football Club and the Hamilton Imperials Football Club in October 2012. After almost 50 years as fierce rivals, the Magpies and Imperials opted to merge after the recommendation was made in the Southern Border Review. The two clubs members decided on a vote for the new name. A popular idea was the Giants, but this was rejected through copyright issues. The options were Hamilton united Kangaroos, Hamilton United Power, Hamilton United Hawks, Hamilton Kangaroos, Hamilton Hawks and Hamilton Power. The Hamilton Kangaroos won with 35% of the votes and the Hamilton Power finished second with 31%.

Hamilton's inaugural year in the Hampden resulted in four senior wins, two against Port Fairy and South, finishing 8th. The Kangaroos had success in the under 18s winning the minor premiership, and in reserves they finished 5th.

== Origins ==
The Hamilton Football Club was formed in 1874, regularly playing friendly matches against other towns along the railway line. After many years playing for medals and donated cup the club went into recess around 1910. Football continued in the town and it was a church aligned competition that also included teams from Penshurst and Dunkeld. After a football carnival held in Hamilton in October 1925 and a combined Hamilton team (made up from players from the local Hamilton and District FA) defeated the premiers of the Western District Football League (Port Fairy), a petition was circulated and a Combined Hamilton side was admitted into the Western District Football League for 1926. Their admittance caused founding club Camperdown to leave and play in a local Colac competition.

== The drama that lead to the rivalry ==
The drama began early in the 1947 season, when the Hamilton FC was languishing near the foot of the Western District League ladder. The club's administrators decided to sack the coach, Ken Block, and replace him with former Melbourne ruckman Jack O'Keefe, who was appointed caretaker coach for the rest of the season.

O'Keefe worked wonders with the team; Hamilton not only made the finals, it won the premiership with a one-point victory in the grand final. Ted Kenna, who had won the Victoria Cross two years earlier for his bravery during a Second World War battle in Papua New Guinea, booted the winning behind.

Not surprisingly, O'Keefe, who had originally declared he would not be returning to Hamilton in 1948, changed his mind. But during the season, Hamilton's vice-president, Pat Condon, had approached star Melbourne full-forward Fred Fanning, with a view to him being appointed the Magpies' coach for their 1948 campaign. Fanning had married a girl from Hamilton and was planning to set up a business in the town. He was promised £12 a game, a big increase on the £3 a game he had been receiving at the Demons.

But O'Keefe's success resulted in Condon also having a change of heart. Three days after the grand final, he proposed that O'Keefe be reappointed coach. Condon's push was summarily dismissed. The key reason: Fanning had been promised money to play, yet the rules at the time stated only the coach could be paid. So enraged by the situation was Condon that he decided to start a new club, Hamilton Imperials, which set up its base on the opposite side of Melville Oval to Hamilton's change rooms. O'Keefe was appointed the inaugural coach. It didn't take long for the rivalry between the Imps (nicknamed the Bulldogs and regarded as the Catholic working man's club) and Hamilton (regarded as the club of the Protestant graziers and toffs) to spark up.

== Hamilton Football Club ==
Jumper	Club	Nickname	Years in comp	Premierships	Premiership Years
	Hamilton	Magpies	WDFL 1926 – 1963; WBFL 1964 – 2012	12 4	1930, 1932, 1933, 1934, 1935, 1946, 1947, 1948, 1950, 1951, 1957, 1958, 1968, 1970, 1981, 2004

Competition	Active	Total games	Wins	Losses	Draws	Percentage wins	Flags
Western District Football League	1926–1963	602	377	220	5	62.62%*	12
Western Border Football League	1964–2012	973	507	461	5	52.11%	4
Total	1926-2012	1575	884	681	10	56.12%	16

== Hamilton Imperials Football Club ==
Formed in 1948 after a split from the Hamilton club.

Jumper	Club	Nickname	Years in comp	WBFL Premierships	Premiership Years
	Hamilton Imperials	Bulldogs	1964 – 2012	6	1977, 1978, 1980, 1993, 1995, 2001

Competition	Active	Total games	Wins	Losses	Draws	Percentage wins	Flags
Western District Football League	1948–1963	317	156	159	2	49.21%	0
Western Border Football League	1964–2012	991	535	451	5	53.99%	6
Total	1948–2012	1308	691	610	7	52.83%	6

== VFL/AFL players ==
- Phil Walsh – Collingwood, Richmond, Brisbane Bears
- Alan Atkinson – Collingwood
- Paul Cranage – Collingwood
- Mick Edmonds – Collingwood
- Tony Russell – Collingwood
- Shannon Watt – North Melbourne
- Adam Campbell Fremantle
- Marcus Picken – Brisbane Bears
- Liam Picken – Western Bulldogs
- Paul Ryan – Collingwood
