= Brad Close =

Australian football league player

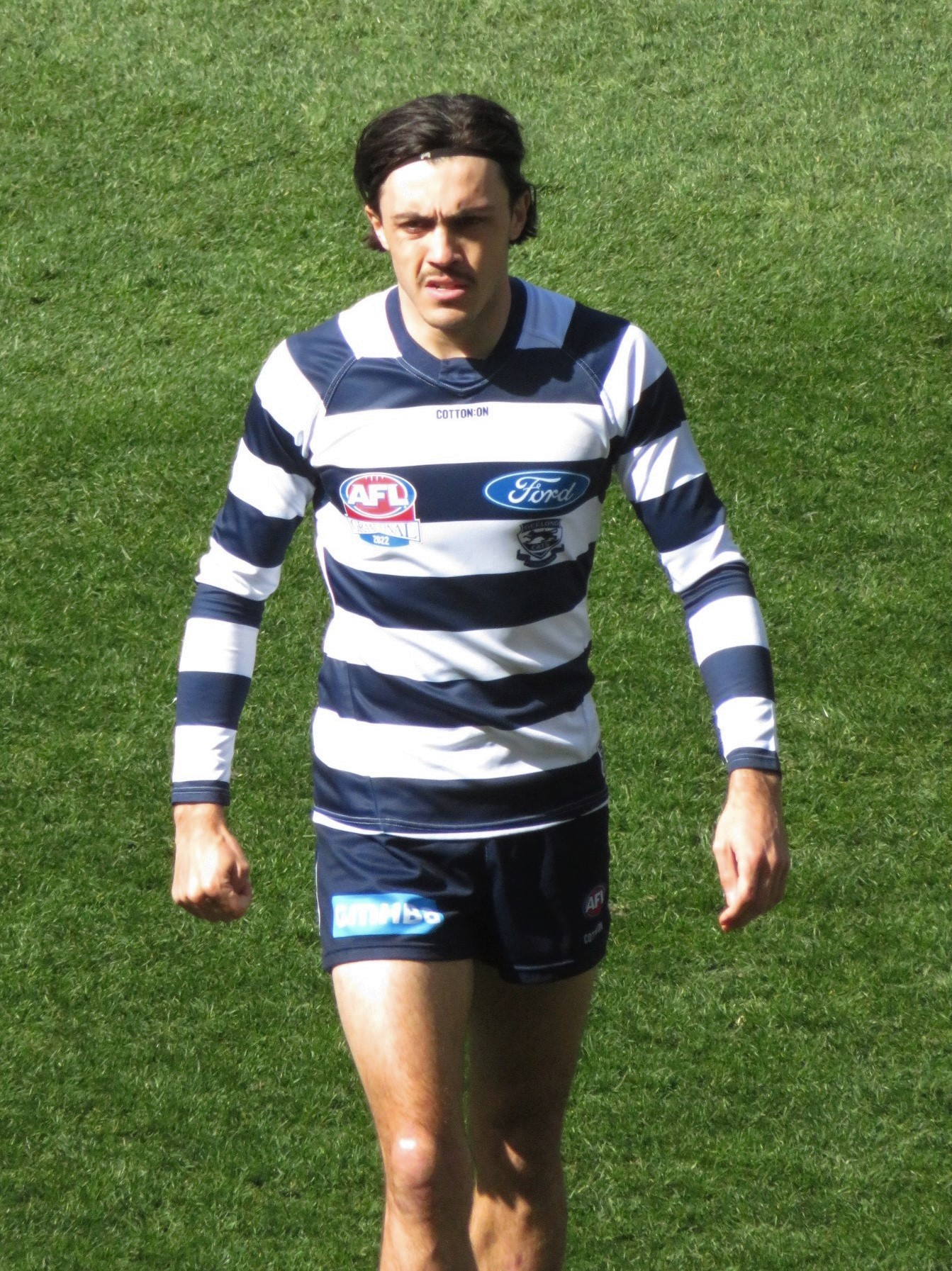

Personal information
- Full name: Bradley Close
- Born: 30 July 1998 (age 28); Mount Gambier, South Australia
- Original team: Glenelg (SANFL)
- Draft: No. 14, 2019 Rookie draft, Geelong
- Debut: 27 July 2020, Geelong vs. Fremantle, at Optus Stadium
- Height: 183 cm (6 ft 0 in)
- Weight: 71 kg (157 lb)
- Position: Forward

Club information
- Current club: Geelong
- Number: 45

Playing career^{1}
Years	Club	Games (Goals)
2020–	Geelong	145 (119)
- ^{1} Playing statistics correct to the end of 2026.

Career highlights
- AFL premiership player: 2022; Geelong best young player: 2020; SANFL premiership player: 2019

Bradley Close (born 30 July 1998) is an Australian rules footballer who plays for the Geelong Cats in the Australian Football League (AFL). He was recruited by the Geelong Cats with the 14th pick in the 2019 rookie draft.

== Early football ==
Close played local football for the North Gambier Football Club. He also played in the SANFL for the Glenelg Football Club in the 2019 season, where he kicked a total of 13 goals over 21 matches, while also winning the 2019 SANFL premiership

== AFL career ==
Close debuted in Geelong's thirty-two point win over the Fremantle Dockers in the eighth round of the 2020 AFL season. Close kicked his first goal with his first kick just one minute into the game, also picking up 14 disposals, 3 marks and 4 tackles. Close took home the Best Young Player Award for the Geelong Football Club at the conclusion of the season. Close signed a contract extension with the Cats in November 2020. Geelong's general manager of football, Simon Lloyd, said "Brad also played well as a forward and we see him having a good future at AFL level. He will continue to develop his game through his strong drive and professionalism and we look forward to seeing Brad further enhance his game in 2021."

== Statistics ==
Updated to the end of round 22, 2026.

Legend
G	Goals	K	Kicks	D	Disposals	T	Tackles
B	Behinds	H	Handballs	M	Marks
#	Played in that season's premiership team

Season	Team	No.	Games	Totals							Averages (per game)							Votes
Season	Team	No.	Games	G	B	K	H	D	M	T	G	B	K	H	D	M	T	Votes
2020 (Note: The 2020 season was played with 17 home-and-away matches per team (down from 22) and 16-minute quarters with time on (down from 20-minute quarters with time on) due to the impact of the COVID-19 pandemic.)	Geelong	45	8	2	2	29	41	70	13	24	0.3	0.3	3.6	5.1	8.8	1.6	3.0	0
2021	Geelong	45	22	15	10	132	159	291	61	72	0.7	0.5	6.0	7.2	13.2	2.8	3.3	0
2022^{#}	Geelong	45	25	26	20	181	213	394	85	93	1.0	0.8	7.2	8.5	15.8	3.4	3.7	0
2023	Geelong	45	21	21	6	124	153	277	53	56	1.0	0.3	5.9	7.3	13.2	2.5	2.7	3
2024	Geelong	45	25	25	12	159	159	318	69	58	1.0	0.5	6.4	6.4	12.7	2.8	2.3	2
2025	Geelong	45	26	19	16	196	131	327	72	58	0.7	0.6	7.5	5.0	12.6	2.8	2.2	0
2026	Geelong	45	14	9	10	69	69	138	29	30	0.6	0.7	4.9	4.9	9.9	2.1	2.1	0
Career			141	117	76	890	925	1815	382	391	0.8	0.5	6.3	6.6	12.9	2.7	2.8	5

== Honours and achievements ==
Team

- AFL Premiership (Geelong): 2022
- McClelland Trophy (Geelong): 2022

Individual

- Geelong F.C. Best Young Player Award: 2020
