= John Mossop =

Australian rules footballer, born 1959

Personal information
- Full name: John Mossop
- Born: 14 June 1959 (age 67)
- Original team: Penola
- Height: 196 cm (6 ft 5 in)
- Weight: 99 kg (218 lb)

Playing career^{1}
Years	Club	Games (Goals)
1979–1986	Geelong	134 (87)
1987–1988	North Melbourne	37 (15)
Total		171 (102)
- ^{1} Playing statistics correct to the end of 1988.

John Mossop (born 14 June 1959) is a former Australian rules footballer in the Victorian Football League for Geelong Football Club and North Melbourne. He wore the number 10 during his tenure at Geelong and played often in the ruck position. Mossop was awarded the Carji Greeves Medal in 1982.
