= Wally Lovett =

Australian rules footballer

Personal information
- Born: 15 December 1961 (age 64)
- Original team: Heywood (WBFL)
- Height: 175 cm (5 ft 9 in)
- Weight: 72 kg (159 lb)

Playing career^{1}
Years	Club	Games (Goals)
1982	Collingwood	15 (11)
1983–1984	Richmond	13 (6)
Total		28 (17)

Representative team honours^{2}
Years	Team	Games (Goals)
1983	Aboriginal All-Stars	1 (4)
- ^{1} Playing statistics correct to the end of 1984.^{2} Representative statistics correct as of 1983.

Wally Lovett (born 15 December 1961) is an indigenous former Australian rules football player who played in the Victorian Football League (VFL) in 1982 for Collingwood and in 1983 and 1984 for Richmond. He later played in the VFA for Brunswick.
