= Brett Gloury =

Australian rules footballer

Personal information
- Born: 3 December 1968 (age 57)
- Original team: Balmoral
- Height: 193 cm (6 ft 4 in)
- Weight: 86 kg (190 lb)

Playing career^{1}
Years	Club	Games (Goals)
1986–1987	Collingwood	4 (0)
- ^{1} Playing statistics correct to the end of 1987.

Brett Gloury (born 3 December 1968) is a former Australian rules footballer who played with Collingwood in the Victorian Football League (VFL).

Originally from Balmoral, Gloury was an All-Australian at the 1985 Teal Cup Under-17s Championships in Perth. He had a tough initiation to league football the following year, when as a 17-year-old on debut, he played as a full-back on Essendon's Paul Salmon. The Essendon player, who was 12 cm taller than his opponent, kicked four goals in the first quarter, prompting the coach to take Gloury off him. He kept his spot in the team for Collingwood's next game, against the Sydney Swans, which he played as a forward and kicked three behinds. In 1987 he made two appearances mid-year, against Fitzroy and North Melbourne, his last two league games.

Gloury later played for Newbridge in the Loddon Valley Football League and with Kangaroo Flat in the Bendigo Football League. He was a member of Kangaroo Flat's 1996 premiership team.
