= David Robbie (Scottish footballer) =

Scottish footballer

Personal information
- Full name: David Middleton Robbie
- Date of birth: 6 October 1899
- Place of birth: Motherwell, Scotland
- Date of death: 4 December 1978 (aged 79)
- Place of death: Bury, England
- Position: Outside right

Senior career*
Years	Team	Apps	(Gls)
- Bathgate
1921–1935	Bury	420	(102)
1935	Plymouth Argyle	3	(0)
1935	Manchester United (trial)	1	(0)
1935–1936	Margate		
1936	Luton Town		

Managerial career
- 1936–1938: Plymouth Argyle (coach)
- 1938–?: Bury (trainer)
- * Club domestic league appearances and goals

David Middleton Robbie (6 October 1899 – 4 December 1978) was a Scottish footballer who played as an outside right. Born in Motherwell, he began his career with Bathgate, before moving to England in 1921, where he spent 14 years playing for Bury, scoring 102 goals in 420 league appearances, including scoring four goals in a single match against Barnsley in the 1931–32 season. In July 1935, he joined Plymouth Argyle but made just three appearances in two months with the club before joining Manchester United on a one-month trial, at the end of which he joined Margate. Four months later, he joined Luton Town, before returning to Plymouth as a coach at the end of the 1935–36 season. Two years later, he moved back to Bury, where he served as the club's trainer until his retirement.
