= David Robbie (Australian footballer) =

Australian rules footballer

Personal information
- Full name: David Robbie
- Born: 11 May 1944 (age 82)
- Original team: Casterton
- Height: 173 cm (5 ft 8 in)
- Weight: 70 kg (154 lb)

Playing career^{1}
Years	Club	Games (Goals)
1963–65	Melbourne	21 (5)
- ^{1} Playing statistics correct to the end of 1965.

David Robbie (born 11 May 1944) is a former Australian rules footballer who played with Melbourne in the Victorian Football League (VFL).
