= East Gambier Football Club =

East Gambier

Names
- Full name: East Gambier Football & Netball Club
- Nickname(s): Bulldogs

Club details
- Founded: 1938; 87 years ago
- Colours: Red Black
- Competition: Limestone Coast Football League
- Coach: Jake Dowdy
- Premierships: 9
- Ground(s): McDonald Park, Mt Gambier

Uniforms
Home

The East Gambier Football & Netball Club is an Australian rules football and netball formed in 1938 that currently competes in the Limestone Coast Football League.

== History ==
The East Gambier Football Club first formally formed in 1938 (though the club had held meetings and elected a chairman for a few years prior). The club first joined the Mid South Eastern Football League. However, due to WWII the 1940 season was abandoned, and the East Gambier Football Club did not compete again until 1946 when it was a founding club of the Mount Gambier and District Football League. The club would remain in this league (which would be renamed the South-East and Border Football League in 1950) until it merged with the Western District Football League to create the Western Border Football League in 1964.

While the club competed in the 1964 season, it wasn't until 1965 that they recorded their first premiership victory. East Gambier beat Heywood by 8 points to secure the 1965 flag. In the 1970s, East appeared in a total of seven senior premierships, winning four (1972, 1973, 1975 and 1976). The Bulldogs won their most recent premierships in the 1980s, defeating South Gambier in 1982, Millicent in 1983, and Millicent again in 1988. In 2017, the club broke a 29-year premiership drought, beating North Gambier.

== Premierships ==
League	Total flags	Premiership years
Limestone Coast Football League	9	1965, 1972, 1973, 1975, 1976, 1982, 1983, 1988, 2017

== Notable Sportspeople ==
=== WBFL Medalists ===
- Gary Lazarus (1972)
- D Clarke (1973)
- D Lane (1990)
- M Jones (1993)

=== Other notable players ===
- C Smith (2017)

== See also ==
- North Gambier Football Club
- South Gambier Football Club
- Limestone Coast Football League
- Mount Gambier
