= David Mitchell (Australian rules footballer) =

Australian rules footballer

Personal information
- Full name: David Mitchell
- Born: 23 December 1964 (age 61)
- Original team: Warrnambool
- Height: 183 cm (6 ft 0 in)
- Weight: 78 kg (172 lb)

Playing career^{1}
Years	Club	Games (Goals)
1986	Fitzroy	4 (2)
- ^{1} Playing statistics correct to the end of 1988.

David Mitchell is a former Australian rules footballer, who played for the Fitzroy Lions in the AFL, which was then known as the VFL.

== Career ==
Mitchell played four games for Fitzroy in the 1986 season, scoring two goals.
