= Neil Sutherland (footballer) =

Australian rules footballer

Personal information
- Full name: Peter Neil Sutherland
- Born: 19 May 1942; Millicent, South Australia
- Died: 24 July 1998 (aged 56); Millicent, South Australia
- Original team: Millicent
- Height: 191 cm (6 ft 3 in)
- Weight: 88 kg (194 lb)

Playing career^{1}
| Years | Club | Games (Goals) |
| 1961–63 | Geelong | 20 (19) |
- ^{1} Playing statistics correct to the end of 1963.

Peter Neil Sutherland (19 May 1942 – 24 July 1998) was an Australian rules footballer who played with Geelong in the Victorian Football League (VFL).
