= Peter Hogan (footballer) =

Australian rules footballer

Personal information
- Full name: Peter Hogan
- Born: 28 November 1945
- Died: 1 December 2007 (aged 62)
- Original team: Portland
- Height: 173 cm (5 ft 8 in)
- Weight: 76 kg (168 lb)
- Position: Rover

Playing career^{1}
| Years | Club | Games (Goals) |
| 1963–66 | Richmond | 40 (57) |
- ^{1} Playing statistics correct to the end of 1966.

Peter Hogan (28 November 1945 – 1 December 2007) was a former Australian rules footballer who played with Richmond in the Victorian Football League (VFL).
