= Paul Cranage =

Australian rules footballer

Personal information
- Full name: Paul Cranage
- Born: 16 January 1953 (age 73)
- Original team: Hamilton/Monivae College
- Height: 183 cm (6 ft 0 in)
- Weight: 76.5 kg (169 lb)
- Position: Defender

Playing career^{1}
Years	Club	Games (Goals)
1973–75	Collingwood	48 (0)
- ^{1} Playing statistics correct to the end of 1975.

Paul Cranage (born 16 January 1953) is a former Australian rules footballer who played with Collingwood in the Victorian Football League (VFL).
