= Australian rules football in South Australia =

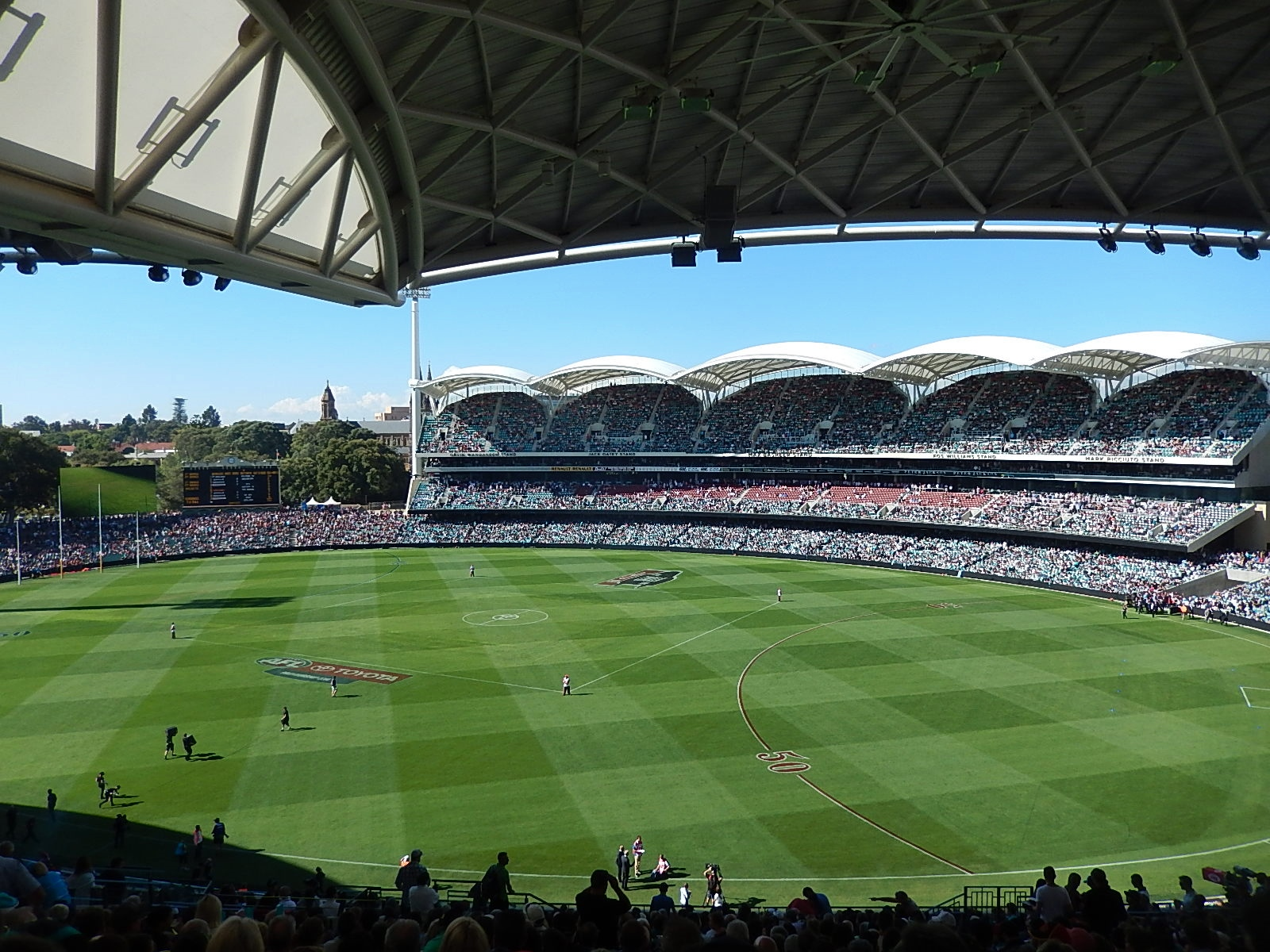
- The 2014 South Australia National Football League Grand Final at the Adelaide Oval
- Governing body: South Australian Football Commission
- Representative team: South Australia
- First played: Adelaide 1877; 149 years ago
- Registered players: 63,969 (adult); 28,692 (child)
- Clubs: 367 (30 competitions)

Club competitions
- South Australia National Football League; Adelaide Footy League; Adelaide Plains Football League; Barossa Light & Gawler Football Association; Broken Hill Football League; Eastern Eyre Football League; Far North Football League; Great Flinders Football League; Great Southern Football League; Hills Football League; Kangaroo Island Football League; Kowree-Naracoorte-Tatiara Football League; Mid South Eastern Football League; North Eastern Football League; Northern Areas Football Association; Port Lincoln Football League; Riverland Football League; River Murray Football League; Southern Football League; Spencer Gulf Football League; Limestone Coast Football Netball League; Whyalla Football League; Yorke Peninsula Football League

Audience records
- Single match: 66,987 (1976). SANFL Grand Final. Sturt vs Port Adelaide. (Football Park, Adelaide)

In South Australia, Australian rules football (known simply as "football" or "footy") is traditionally a popular participation and spectator sport. It is governed by the South Australian Football Commission which runs the South Australia National Football League in the capital Adelaide, the highest profile competition among the 24 spread across the state. Participation has fallen substantially in recent years to a current rate of 4.1%. There are 63,969 adults and 28,692 children playing, less than a quarter of which are female. Prior to 2019 it was the most participated team sport in the state, however it dropped to third after both basketball and soccer there surpassed it in 2024.

Forms of football were played very early in the history of the Colony of South Australia pre-dating the organisation of Australian rules football in Victoria and rivalled football's popularity there. In 1877, the colony officially adopted the code in order to compete in the very first intercolonial representative football match in Australia against Victoria. The first governing body, the South Australian Football Association (now SANFL) formed on 13 April 1877, remains the oldest in Australia. Its clubs rivalled Victoria's in popularity and won 9 of 19 Championship of Australia titles from 1888 to 1975. Even with its current semi-professional status, it remains the second most popular and third strongest competition in the world in the sport.

The state team (the "Croweaters") has defeated every other state has the equal second most wins, and an intense rivalry with Victoria inspiring the popular catchcry "Kick a Vic". Adelaide hosted national carnivals in 1911, 1930, 1953, 1969, 1975, 1980 and 1988.

South Australia has two fully professional teams competing in the Australian Football League (AFL) and AFL Women's (AFLW), both based in the capital Adelaide: the Adelaide Football Club (1990) and Port Adelaide Football Club (1870), the latter having the distinction of being the only pre-existing club to have entered the AFL from another league, as a founding member of the SAFA (SANFL). These two clubs compete against each other in the "Showdown". South Australia was chosen to host the inaugural 2023 'Gather Round' where all AFL matches are played in one state and has retained the event since.

It is the most watched sport and has the second largest television audience in the country. From 1976 to 2003 the SANFL held the record for the largest attendance in the sport outside of Victoria. South Australia holds the world record for a non-VFL/AFL attendance with the 1976 SANFL Grand Final drawing an estimated 80,000 spectators which remains the record crowd for any code of football in the state and the third highest official attendance outside of Victoria. The SANFL remains the second most attended league worldwide in the sport and attracts a television audience larger than that of some AFL clubs. Since 1991 South Australia has attracted an average AFL premiership season attendance of 35,919, second in the country, boosted with the 2014 upgrade of the Adelaide Oval the state's flagship venue.

The state has produced some of the greatest Australian Footballers of all time, including the Australian Football Hall of Fame legends: Barrie Robran, Malcolm Blight, Jack Oatey, Russell Ebert and Ken Farmer. In addition, it has produced almost a thousand born and raised AFL/AFLW players, most notably: AFL players Craig Bradley who has the most games with 375 and Stephen Kernahan who has the most goals with 738. In women's Australian rules, Ebony Marinoff has the most games and Ashleigh Woodland has the most goals.

== History ==
=== Early examples of football (1843–1853) ===
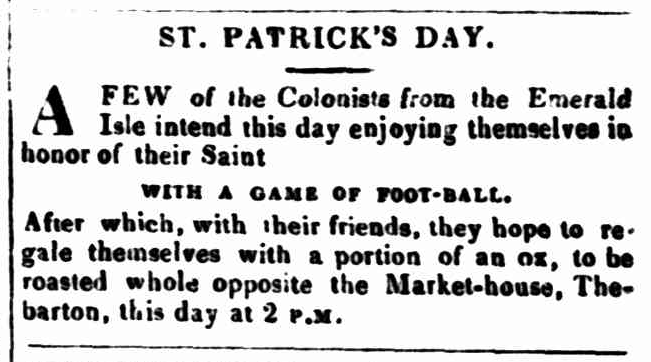
Advertisement in the Southern Australian newspaper dated 17 March 1843 for an upcoming Irish Football game to celebrate St Patricks Day.

Football challenge advertisement that appeared in the 22 March 1853 calling for fellow Irishmen to join in a game of football in Thebarton

The first recorded game of any "football" in South Australia was that of 'Caid' played in Thebarton by people of the local Irish community in 1843 to celebrate St Patrick's Day.

In 1844 there was debate amongst the South Australian Legislative Council whether it be allowed that "foot-ball" be played on Sundays, with arguments against preferring the quiet worship of God.

In 1853 a group of Irishmen from County Westmeath, Ireland placed an advertisement in the South Australian Register calling for Irishmen from another county of Ireland to join them in Thebarton to play a game of football.

In 1854 at the opening of a new school in Morphett Vale, at the end of the first day the students played a game of football amongst other activities.

In 1855 William Anderson Cawthorne illustrated a series of images documenting South Australia's indigenous people including a pair of playthings, one being a sling and the other being a ball, referred to in Kaurna language as Pando.

==== John Acraman and St Peters College (1854) ====
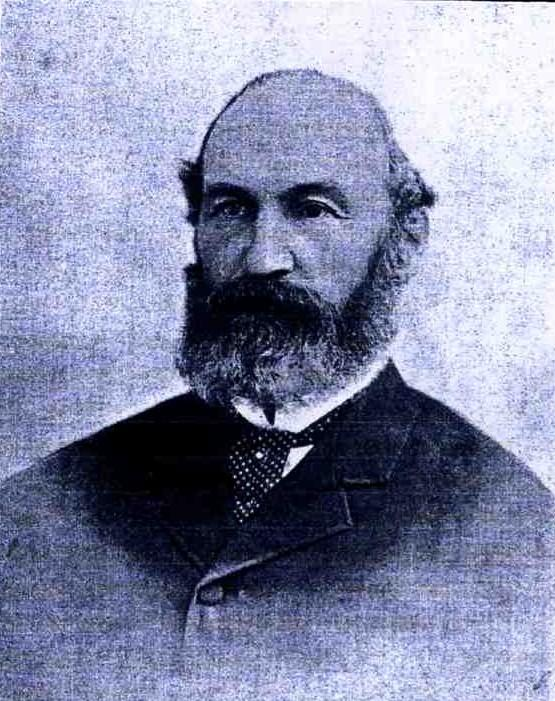
John Acraman was a successful businessman who lived in Adelaide and sponsored the development of football at St Peter's College, Adelaide in the 1850s.

In 1854 Adelaide businessman John Acraman imported five round footballs from England and paid for the construction of goal posts at St Peter's College in Adelaide's eastern suburbs. St Peter's football matches were played between Frome Road and Adelaide Bridge, on a similar site to the current University Oval. Harrow football, involving kicking the ball but not running with it, was played.

=== Growing popularity (1855–1859) ===
In June 1855 the Sunday School associated with St Jude's Church in Brighton included football for its children's activities.

On 4 November 1856 a Temperance Festival with 400 participants included games of football.

In 1857 a football match was held in Glenelg as part of the annual Commemoration Festival to celebrate the 21st anniversary of the proclamation of the colony of South Australia.

In 1859 the Gawler Institute ran a rural fete which included a game of football being staged. The start of this match featured "a long first run to the ball". On 12 March 1859 the town of Angaston held a farewell party for Charles Fuller which included football. For the Prince of Wales Birthday the Drapers Assistants Association included a football game in their festivities at Waterfall Gully. During a Christmas picnic in 1859 football was played by the employees of 'English & Brown' at Fourth Creek (River Torrens).

=== Formation of designated clubs (1860–1875) ===
The earliest recorded football club in South Australia was the original Adelaide Football Club (unrelated to its modern namesake), formed on 26 April 1860. The Adelaide club hosted intra-club matches to provide a platform for football games to be played. Later in 1860 two new teams were formed bearing the names North Adelaide Football Club and South Adelaide Football Club, also unrelated to their modern namesakes.

On 20 May 1861 the Adelaide Council were presented with a request by a party representing an "East Adelaide Football Club" (John Clark) to erect football goals in the East Park Lands but were refused.

In 1862 the newly formed Modbury and Tea Tree Gully Football Club was invited to play a match against the Adelaide team. A return match was held later in the year. In 1867 in regional South Australia the Wallaroo Bay Football Club was founded, confined to playing games among its own members until Moonta Football Club was formed in 1874. The early years of football were poorly organised and dogged by argument over which set of rules to adopt. In fact, after a match between Port Adelaide and Kensington in 1873, it was remarked that neither side understood the rules clearly, and there was uncertainty over which team had won. However, as the years progressed, there became a growing push for uniformity and structure in South Australian football.

=== 20 July Meeting (1876) ===
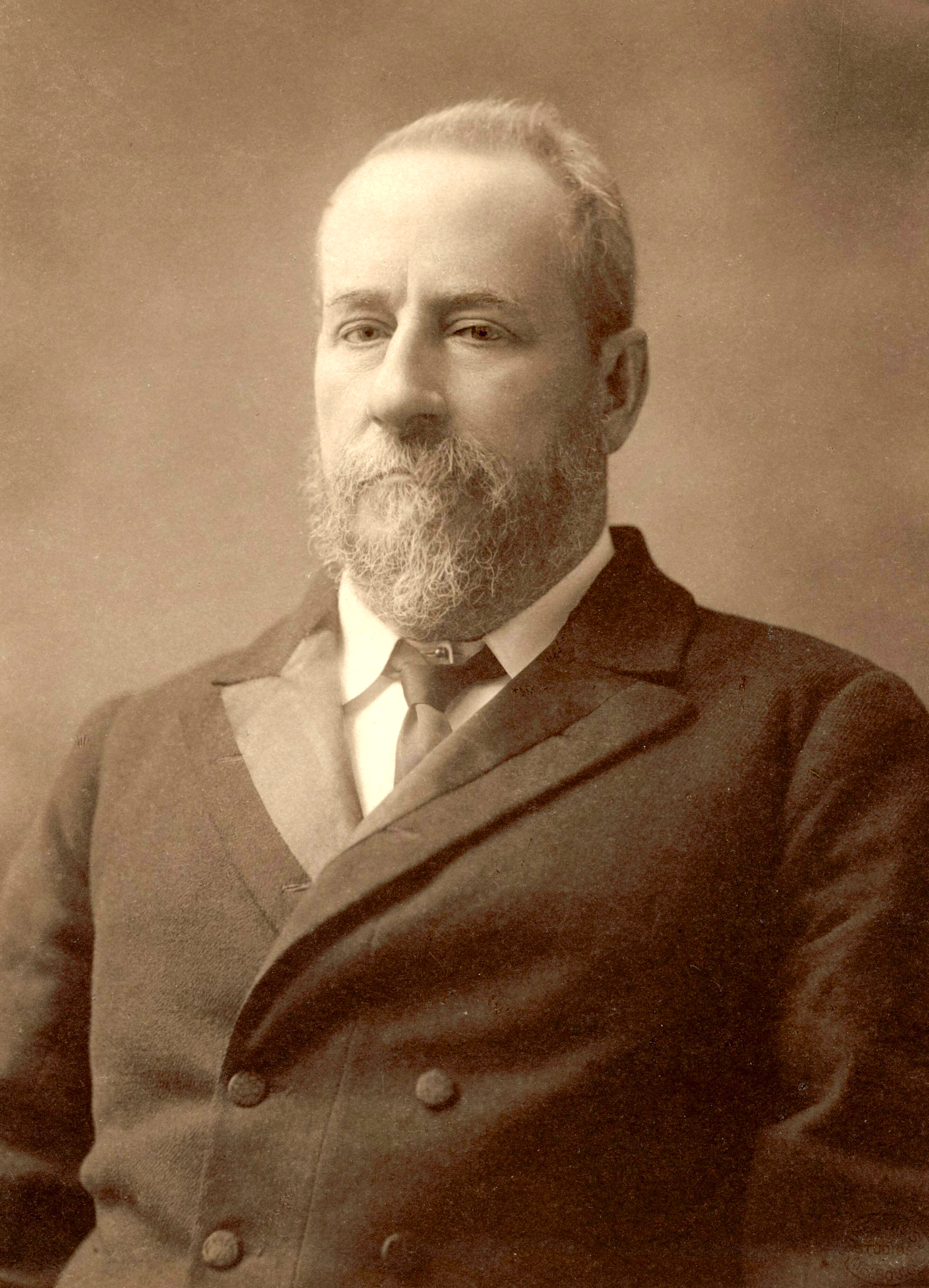
At the old Prince Alfred Hotel on 20 July 1876 a meeting between local club delegates was held where Charles Kingston pleaded that all the local clubs adopt the rules of the "Old Adelaide club" as they were similar to those in use in Victoria. He said that by adopting the "Old Adelaide club rules" intercolonial matches could be played between states.

After a period of years with clubs fighting over technicalities of rules a meeting was held between representatives of the Adelaide, South Adelaide, Victorian and Woodville clubs. At the meeting Charles Kingston argued that "it was possible that someday an inter-colonial football match might be played, and it was desirable in that case that South Australian players should play the game as it was played in other colonies". During his plea to the other clubs at the meeting he compared the 'Old Adelaide rules' to those used in Victoria saying 'practically there was but little difference between them'.

=== Establishment of SAFA (1877) ===
Following an initial meeting on Thursday 19 April 1877 at Prince Alfred Hotel called by Richard Twopeny the Captain of the Adelaide Football Club two delegates each from the following Football Clubs - Kensington, South Park, Willunga, Port Adelaide, Adelaide, North Adelaide, Prince Alfred College, Gawler, Kapunda, Bankers, Woodville, South Adelaide and Victorian attended a meeting held at the Prince Alfred Hotel in King William Street, Adelaide held on 30 April 1877 to develop a uniform set of rules and establish a governing body.

They formed the South Australian Football Association, the first governing body of its type for football in Australia, and adopted rules similar to those used in Victoria. The use of an oval ball, bouncing the ball and pushing from behind forbidden amongst the rules agreed. The inaugural 1877 SAFA season was contested by 8 clubs.

=== Early years of organised competition (1877–1886) ===
A newly formed club Norwood joined the South Australian Football Association in 1878, but Bankers (1877), Woodville (1877), Adelaide (1877-1881), Kensington (1877-1881), Royal Park (1882), South Park (1877-1884), Victorian (1877-1884), Willunga, North Adelaide, Prince Alfred College and Kapunda had all folded or left the SAFA within the first 10 years.

In 1879-1880 there was a growing call to create a junior competition for the growing number of other clubs which included amongst others - North Parks, St.Peter's College, Prince Alfred College, Royal Parks, West Torrens, Woodville, South Suburban, Hotham, and Middlesex.

The first Annual General Meeting of the Adelaide and Suburban Association was held at Prince Alfred Hotel on 27 March 1882. The following clubs - North Parks, N.A Juniors, Kensington, Kent Town, Albion, Triton, and West Torrens were represented.

The South Australian Junior Football Association was officially formed following meetings held at the Hamburg Hotel on 17 and 24 March 1885. It was decided to limit the Association to 10 clubs - Coromandel Valley, Prospect, Creswick, Medindie, Hindmarsh, Kingston, Lefevre's Peninsula, Semaphore, Albert Park, and Fitzroy.

=== Growth as major pastime (1887–1915) ===
1887 saw existing clubs Gawler, Hotham and West Adelaide join the SAFA competition with the last of those bearing no relation to the modern day West Adelaide Bloods. The Association experienced a resurgence in the late 1880s. From the 1886 season to the 1887 attendances almost doubled.

1888 saw Medindie (which renamed to North Adelaide in 1893) joining the Association, but West Adelaide folded after just one season and Hotham (which had renamed North Adelaide for 1888) merged with Adelaide for 1889. For 1891 Season Gawler withdrew from competition games (having complained about the 1890 program when only given 5 home and 10 away games) but remained a member of the SAFA.

By the 1894 Season, the Association had been reduced to just four clubs (Port Adelaide, South Adelaide, Norwood, North Adelaide originally called Medindie until 1892) with the demise of the Old Adelaide Football Club (which was founded in 1860) at the end of the 1893 Season.

West Torrens (which joined as Port Natives in 1895 and renamed in 1897) and West Adelaide (1897) meant the Association had expanded to six clubs until the turn of the century.

In 1898, the Magarey Medal was awarded to the fairest and most brilliant player for the first time.

Sturt joined the Association in 1901 and in 1907, the Association was renamed the South Australian Football League.

=== War years (1916–1944) ===
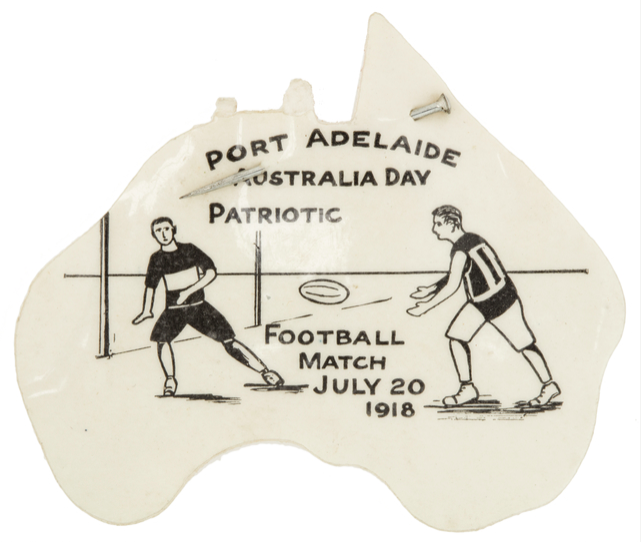
Some league clubs went against the preferences of the SAFL during World War I and formed the South Australian Patriotic Football League which ran for three seasons.

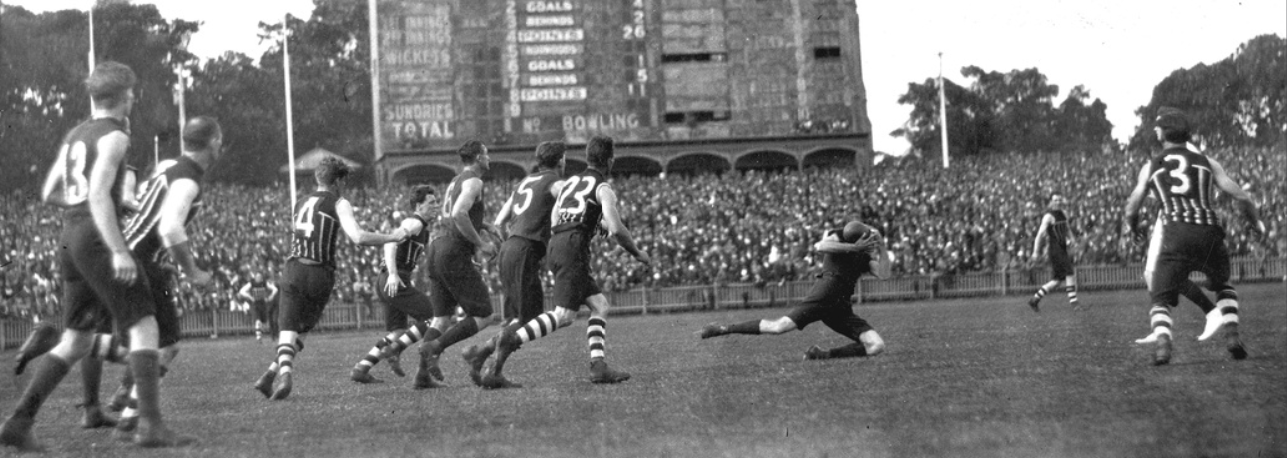
Port Adelaide playing Norwood during the 1921 SAFL Grand Final at Adelaide Oval.

The SAFL was suspended from 1916–18 due to World War I. Glenelg joined the league in 1921. In 1927, the South Australian Football League was renamed the South Australian National Football League. During World War II, the eight clubs merged to form four composite clubs over the period 1942–44.

=== Golden era (1945–1981) ===
The post war years saw the code become a part of everyday life with mass media providing greater coverage than ever before. After Port Adelaide had won its 8th premiership in the last 10 seasons the SANFL admitted two new clubs for the 1964 season, Central District and Woodville. The latter club Woodville being located less than 3 km away from Port Adelaide.

=== Move towards national club competition (1982–1989) ===
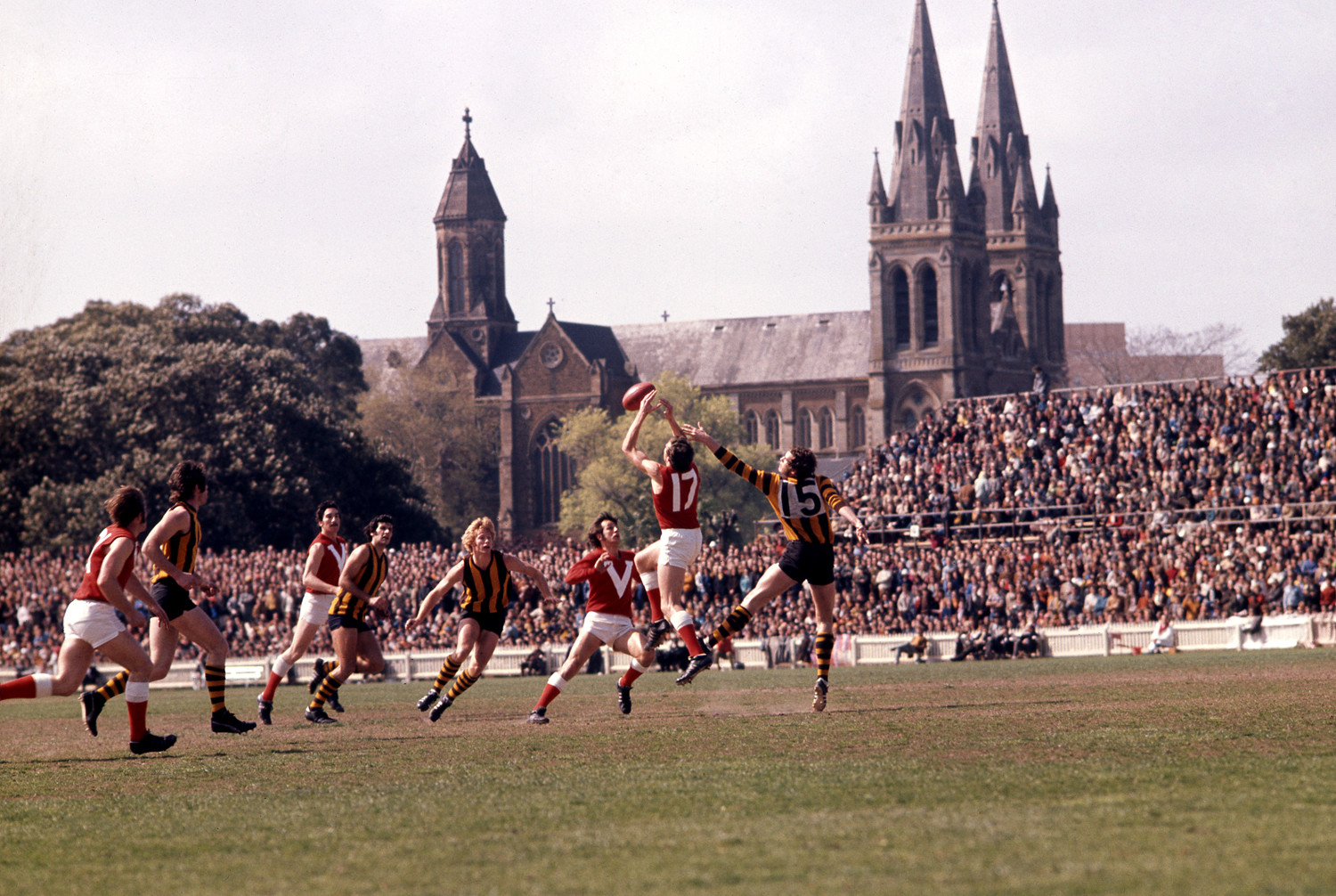
SANFL premier North Adelaide contest against the VFL premier Hawthorn at the Adelaide Oval for the title of Championship of Australia in 1971.

In 1982 the SANFL approached the VFL in regards to entering two sides, Port Adelaide and longtime major rival Norwood, in the Victorian league. This action was also taken by WAFL club East Perth in 1980. All approaches were ignored by the VFL at the time with the reason given by Jack Hamilton being that the VFL clubs thought that one or two SANFL teams would end up being too strong later admitting that they also wanted to continue to poach the states best players, which would soon include Craig Bradley and Stephen Kernahan in 1986. 1982 also saw the first instance of the VFL expanding beyond Melbourne and Geelong with the South Melbourne Football Club being relocated to Sydney. The Port Adelaide Football Club's annual report from late 1982 showed that the failure of the attempts made by South Australian and West Australian clubs to enter the VFL significantly impacted the club's understanding of its future. From this point Port Adelaide restructured the club in regards to economics, public relations and on-field performance for an attempt to enter the league in 1990. There was genuine feeling that failure to do this would result in the club ceasing to exist in the future. In 1985 Port Adelaide registered itself as a national football club. Sentiment at this time amongst the direction of Australian rules football in South Australia was succinctly encapsulated by a Michael Robinson article in the 1985 Football Times Yearbook that previewed the SANFL's upcoming season. In that article Robinson wrote about the disappointment of the equal gate sharing of match takings enforced by the SANFL for the upcoming season with the stronger South Australian clubs propping up ailing clubs such as Woodville.

"What would be left of the SA league without the great clubs such as Norwood and Port Adelaide? It would drop to a miserable fourth-class contest. No one could blame Norwood and Port Adelaide for wanting to get out of the SA league into national ranks if they are further threatened by the dragging down process.

— Michael Robinson, in regards to impacts of gate revenue sharing adopted by the SANFL for the 1985 season on Norwood and Port Adelaide

The following year the SANFL registered the name "Adelaide Football Club" in 1986 but ended up deciding against entering a team into the VFL. In 1986 Norwood Football Club made an independent approach to the VFL with entry into the league discussed in great detail but these discussions ultimately failed to materialise. In 1987 the West Coast Eagles and Brisbane Bears were admitted to the Victorian Football League leaving South Australia as the only mainland state without representation in the VFL.

"In 1988 a deputation from Norwood Football Club had announced it was interested in joining the VFL 'at any time in the future' and ... a private consortium headed by Ken Eustice was interested in grabbing a licence".

— Ross Oakley

By 1989 seven out of ten SANFL clubs were recording losses and the combined income of the SANFL and WAFL had dropped to 40% of that of the VFL. The 1989 Port Adelaide annual report and November newsletter contrasted with the outlook of other SANFL and WAFL clubs. After its demolition of North Adelaide in the 1989 SANFL Grand Final holding its opposition to a single goal, the club claimed a profit in the annual report and hinted at its intentions the following year in the club newsletter by saying Port Adelaide was "far better than their nearest rival in the SANFL".

=== First South Australian AFL club (1990) ===
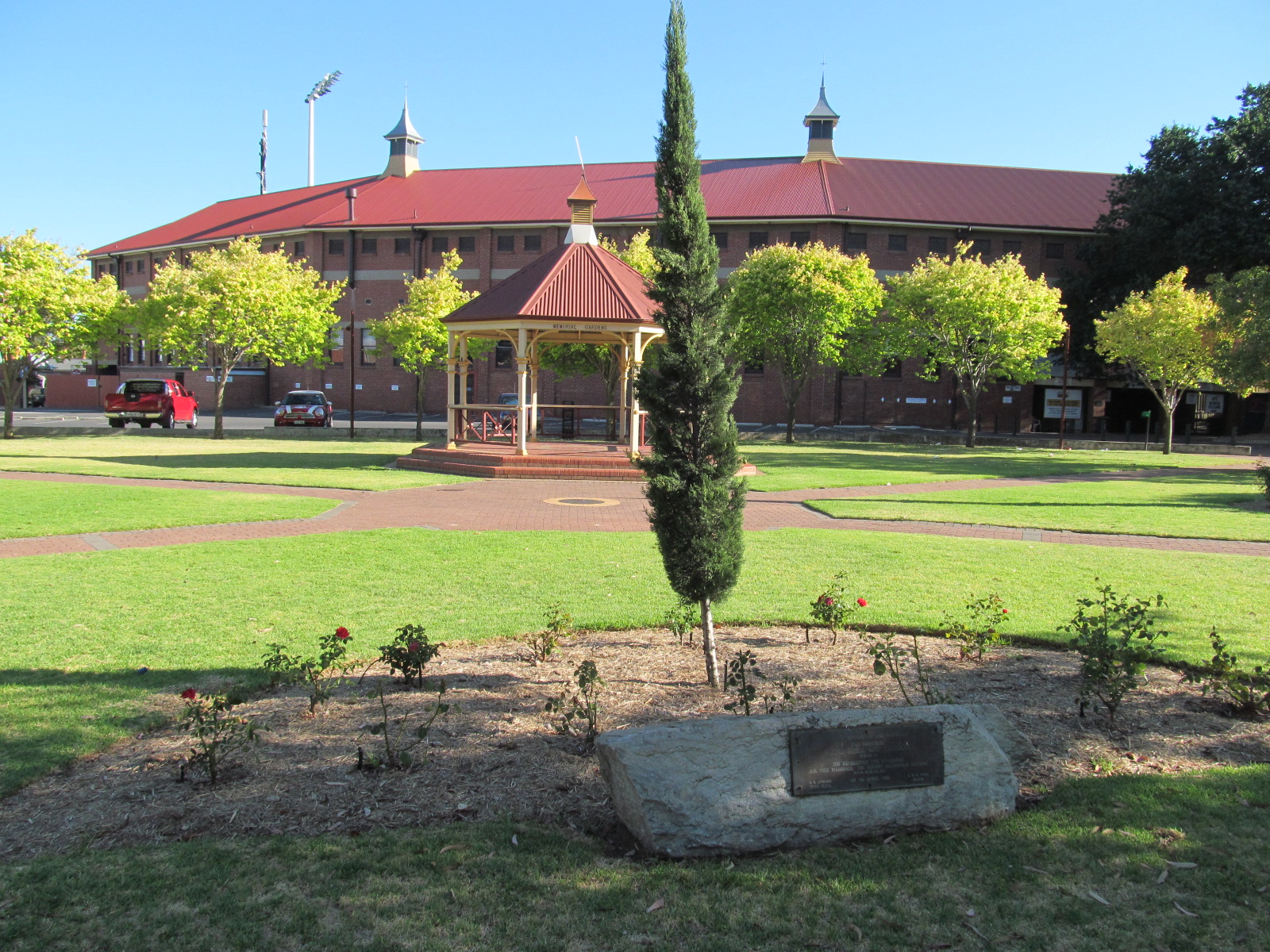
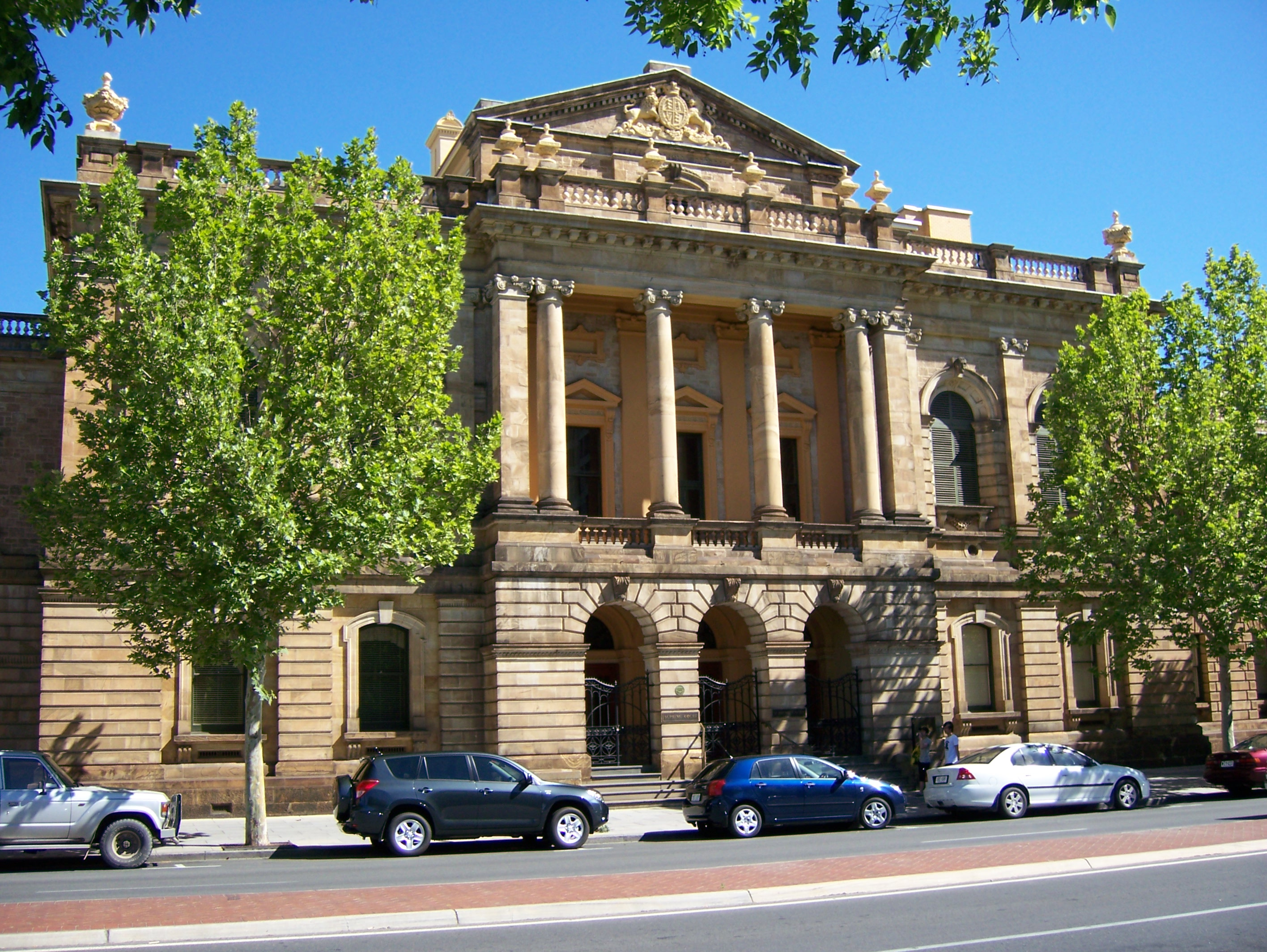
Left: On 9 August 1990 it was revealed Norwood had been in discussions with the AFL to join in 1991. However, after seeing the local media response to Port Adelaide's bid they sided with the SANFL. Norwood would again try to gain a licence during 1994 in a merger with Sturt
Right: An injunction was won in the Supreme Court of South Australia preventing Port Adelaide from continuing its discussions with the AFL after 12 August 1990

During early 1990 the SANFL had decided to wait three years before making any further decision. Frustrated with lack of progress, Port Adelaide were having secret negotiations in the town of Quorn for entry in 1991. A practice match organised by Port Adelaide and Geelong on 25 February at Football Park attracted at over 30,000 spectators and illustrated the potential of a South Australian side in the newly renamed national competition. Around the same time AFL was also seeking Norwood to join the national competition in 1990. However Norwood would eventually side with the SANFL after seeing the media reaction to Port Adelaide's attempts.

"They [the SANFL clubs] are not going to make that decision until they are at the lowest possible ebb. They'd be voting themselves into obscurity [opting for a composite team] in their state."

— Ross Oakley, in regards to the other SANFL clubs opposing Port Adelaide's entry.

When the knowledge of Port Adelaide Football Club's negotiations to gain an AFL licence were made public, the other SANFL clubs saw it as an act of treachery. Subsequently, the SANFL clubs, led by Glenelg and Norwood, urged Justice Olssen to make an injunction against the bid, which he agreed to. In total the SANFL spent $500,000 in legal fees to stop Port Adelaide's entry into the AFL, with the latter simply unable to compete in the court room. The SANFL promptly created a composite team to beat Port Adelaide's bid. The Adelaide Football Club gained what was very close to being Port Adelaide's licence to the AFL and began playing in 1991. The new Adelaide club would adopt the moniker of "Crows" after the states inhabitants often used the nickname "Crow-eaters". During this time the SANFL began suing people involved with Port Adelaide, including people volunteering in unpaid positions, with the AFL quickly stepping in to guarantee the protection of the club and associated people. In 2014 during an interview with the Adelaide Advertiser, Ross Oakley revealed that "In desperation to force (the SANFL’s) hand...we began dealing directly with two powerhouse clubs of the SANFL, Norwood and Port Adelaide...we were changing the league’s name to AFL – and we could not go without a team from Adelaide".

1990 SANFL Grand Final; Last game without AFL in SA.	G	B	Total
Glenelg	13	15	93
Port Adelaide	16	12	108
Venue: Football Park	Crowd: 50,589

"These twenty blokes, everyone who has helped us, are sensational people and all the views that you have read in the press the one thing that really matters is that there will always be a Port Adelaide Football Club."

— George Fiacchi, upon accepting the 1990 Jack Oatey Medal for best on ground at the 1990 SANFL Grand Final.

"I want to tell you that you want to enjoy this moment for what it is because the good times are well and truly gone. Apart from Jack (John Cahill) and the players there are a couple of individuals out there who are responsible for that and make sure you enjoy tonight because the good times will not happen again."

— Glenelg coach and inaugural Adelaide coach Graham Cornes's address to the Port Adelaide change-rooms post the 1990 SANFL Grand Final.

The front runners for the coaching job at the newly created club were both involved in the last SANFL game played in South Australia before the advent of a local AFL team, the 1990 SANFL Grand Final. In that game Port Adelaide, coached by John Cahill defeated Glenelg, coached by Graham Cornes, by 15 points. Graham Cornes ended up being selected to coach Adelaide for the 1991 AFL season. Cornes compiled a club list of the best players from South Australia, with few originating from other states, in what was almost a state side in the first year. Chris McDermott, captain of Glenelg in the 1990 SANFL Grand Final, was designated as the Crows inaugural captain. Despite Port Adelaide being SANFL premiers in 1990, only 5 players from the team became part of the Adelaide squad of 52. Those players being Bruce Abernethy, Simon Tregenza, David Brown, Darren Smith and Scott Hodges, with the last three joining Port Adelaide's inaugural AFL squad in 1997.

=== Race to be second South Australian AFL club (1991–1996) ===
The admission of Adelaide to the AFL had a devastating impact on the leagues attendances with the SANFL recording a 45% drop between 1990 and 1993. Port Adelaide defied this trend of falling SANFL attendances recording an increase of 13% from 1990 to 1993.

"I only hope petty jealousies and fears within the S.A.N.F.L. don't short circuit a Port Adelaide proposal which clearly seems better than any other"

— Tony Greenberg, Inside Football, June 1994

In 1994 the AFL announced that South Australia would receive a licence for a second team based in the state. The major bids competing with Port Adelaide this time around were from merger club proposals in Norwood-Sturt, and Glenelg-South. On 15 June the SANFL handed down a report recommending the second license go to a team formed from the amalgamation of two clubs.

"The sub-licence should be granted to an amalgamation of two SANFL clubs"

— SANFL, Report on the Future Direction of Football in South Australia, 15 June 1994

On 16 June it was reported in The Age by Stephen Linnell that "the League's preference was for a single, established club to join the league". The final tenders were submitted to the SANFL on 14 September 1994 including Port Adelaide's second application, Norwood–Sturt's merged club bid with the remaining application coming from Woodville–West Torrens.

"In my opinion coming second [not getting the second South Australian AFL licence] means you die"

— Michael Aish, Norwood champion, August 1994

On 2 October Port Adelaide won the 1994 SANFL Grand Final, its fifth in seven years. On 13 December Port Adelaide won the tender for the second SA license over its various state rivals, however it was prevented from entering the competition before 1996 as stipulated in the Adelaide license agreement. In 1995 after an SANFL game at Football Park the Adelaide began carrying out a training session which was interrupted by a large hoard of Port Adelaide supporters chanting "We're coming to get you". Adelaide coach Robert Shaw was the only Adelaide official to confront the hoard. In 1996 Port Adelaide was left to wait again as a vacancy was required in the league.

It was announced on 27 October 1995 that Port Adelaide would be participating in the 1997 AFL season, one season later than initially planned and seven years after the clubs first failed bid in 1990.

=== National premierships (1997–2004) ===
From 1997 to 2004 South Australian AFL clubs won three Australian Football League premierships.

=== Adelaide Oval return (2009–2014) ===
After previous hosting the highest level of Australian rules football in South Australia from 1877 to 1973, Adelaide Oval once again became permanent the home of top level Australian rules football in South Australia after a major redevelopment of the ground.

== Regional variation ==
Some variations of Australian Rules Football in South Australia compared with other Australian states still exist:

Points system: In South Australia, most leagues award two points for a win, and one for a draw. Elsewhere in Australia generally four points are awarded for a win and two for a draw.

Percentage: In South Australia, ladder percentage is usually calculated as "For" ÷ "For and Against" × "100". Elsewhere in Australia it is generally calculated as "For" ÷ "Against" × "100".

Behind posts: Behind posts have generally been coloured red in South Australia, as opposed to white elsewhere.

Goalkicker listings: Match reports in South Australia generally list goals and behinds scored by player, whereas elsewhere in Australia goals only are generally shown.

Field markings: The "50" on the 50-metre line at AAMI Stadium is in a serif font, whereas at Victorian grounds a sans-serif font is used.

== Attendance record ==
- 66,987 (1976). SANFL Grand Final. Sturt vs Port Adelaide. (Football Park, Adelaide)

== Major Australian Rules events in South Australia ==
- Australian Football League Premiership Season (Crows and Power home games) including 'Gather Round' (2023-2026) a special round in which all AFL matches are played in the state
- The Showdown
- Port Adelaide-Norwood SANFL rivalry
- SANFL Grand Final
- State League Interstate matches

== Players ==
=== Participation ===
According to Ausplay, there are 63,969 players and the overall participation rate per capita is 4.1%. In 2019 was the only state in Australia where Australian rules football participation was higher than soccer, however soccer surpassed it in 2024.

In 2007, there were 14,825 senior players in SA and total participation of 72,971.

Adult players
2007	2019	2023/24
72,791	68,985	63,969

=== South Australians in the Australian Football Hall of Fame ===
see Australian Football Hall of Fame

==== Legends ====
Player	Clubs played for	Year inducted
Ken Farmer	North Adelaide	2025
Barrie Robran	North Adelaide	1996
Malcolm Blight	Woodville, North Melbourne	1996
Russell Ebert	Port Adelaide, North Melbourne	1996
Jack Oatey	Norwood, West Adelaide, Sturt	1996

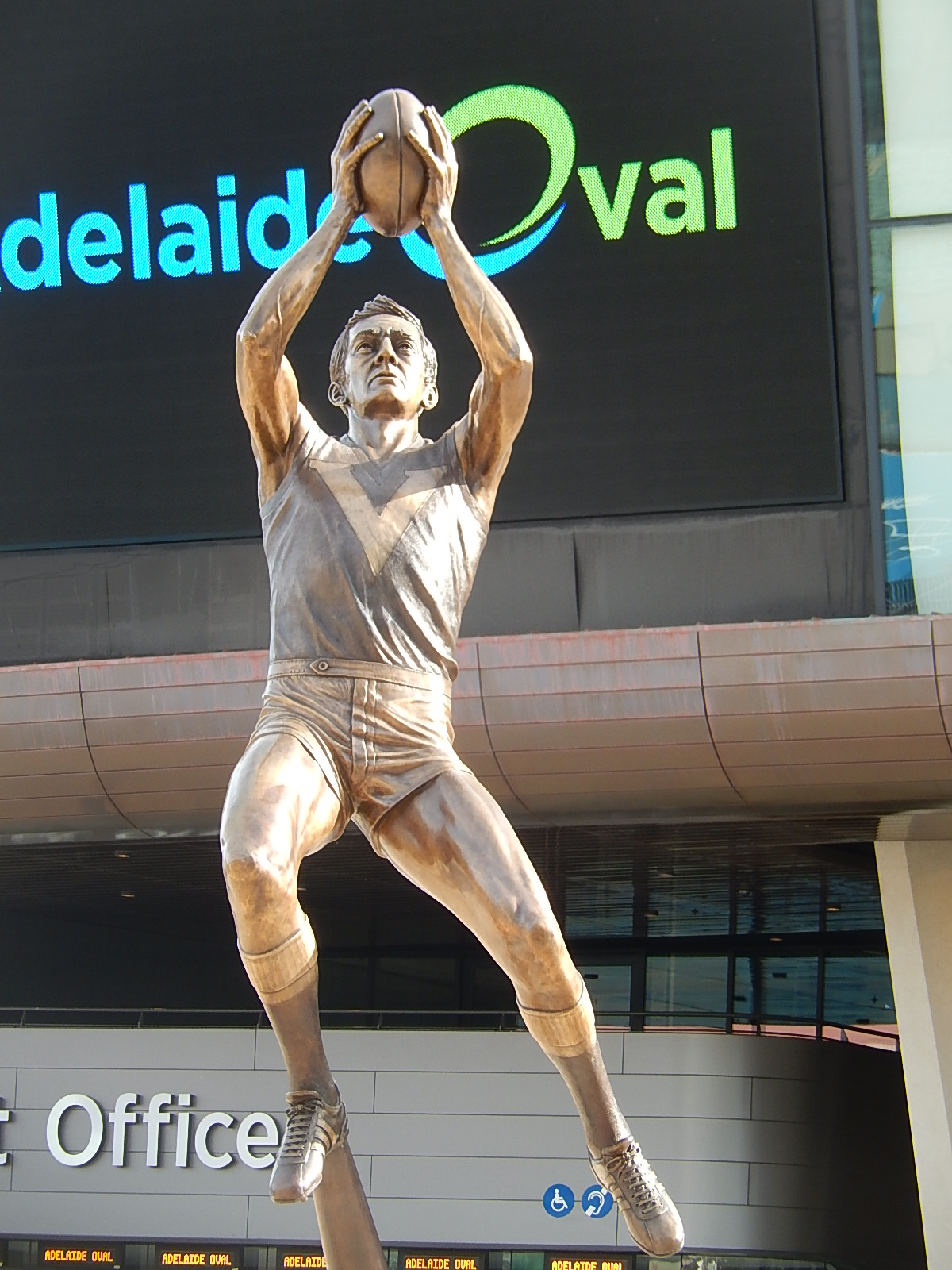
Barrie Robran statue

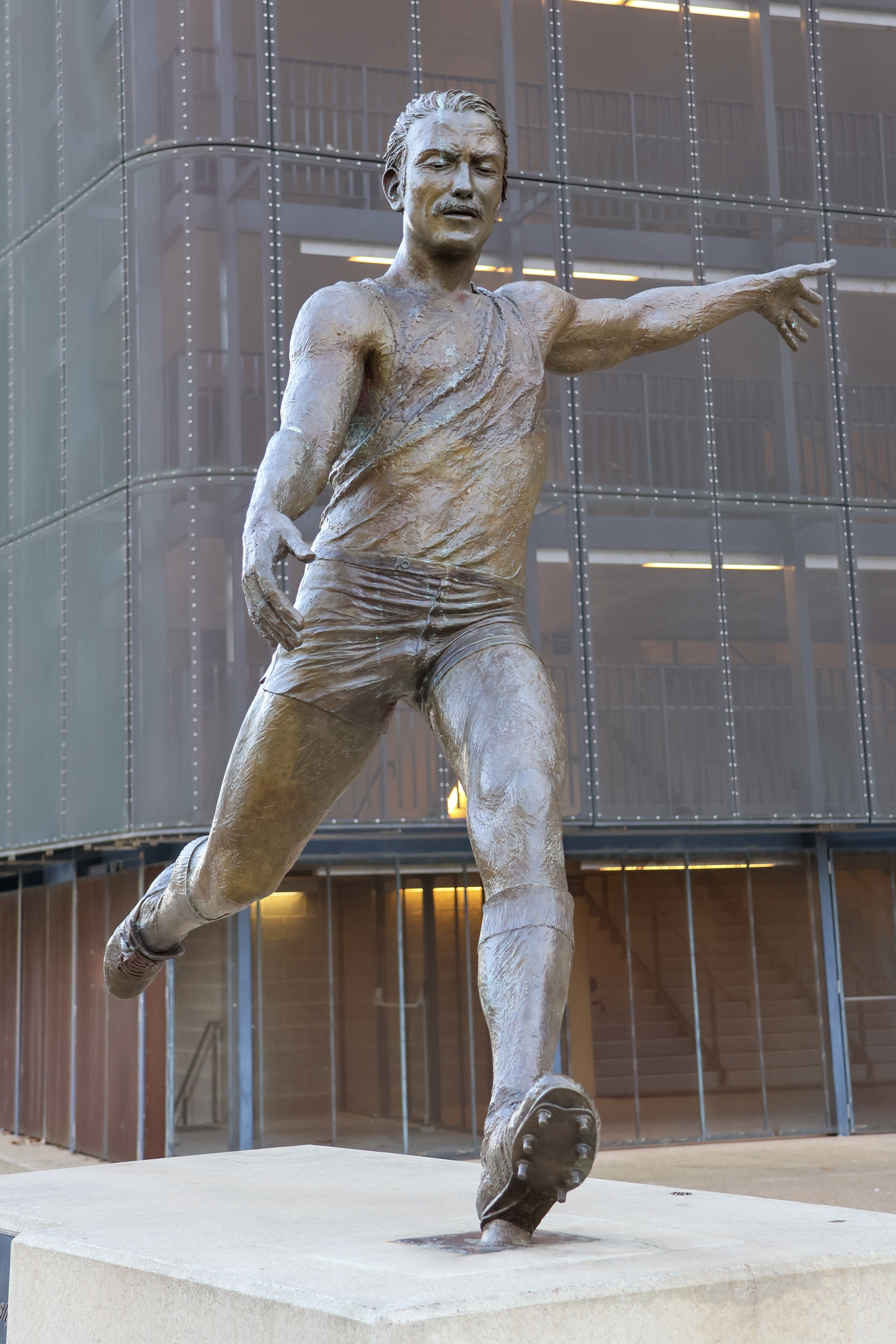
Malcolm Blight statue

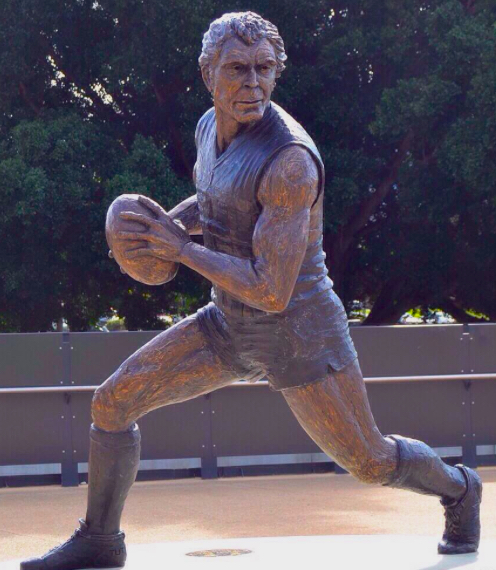
Russell Ebert statue

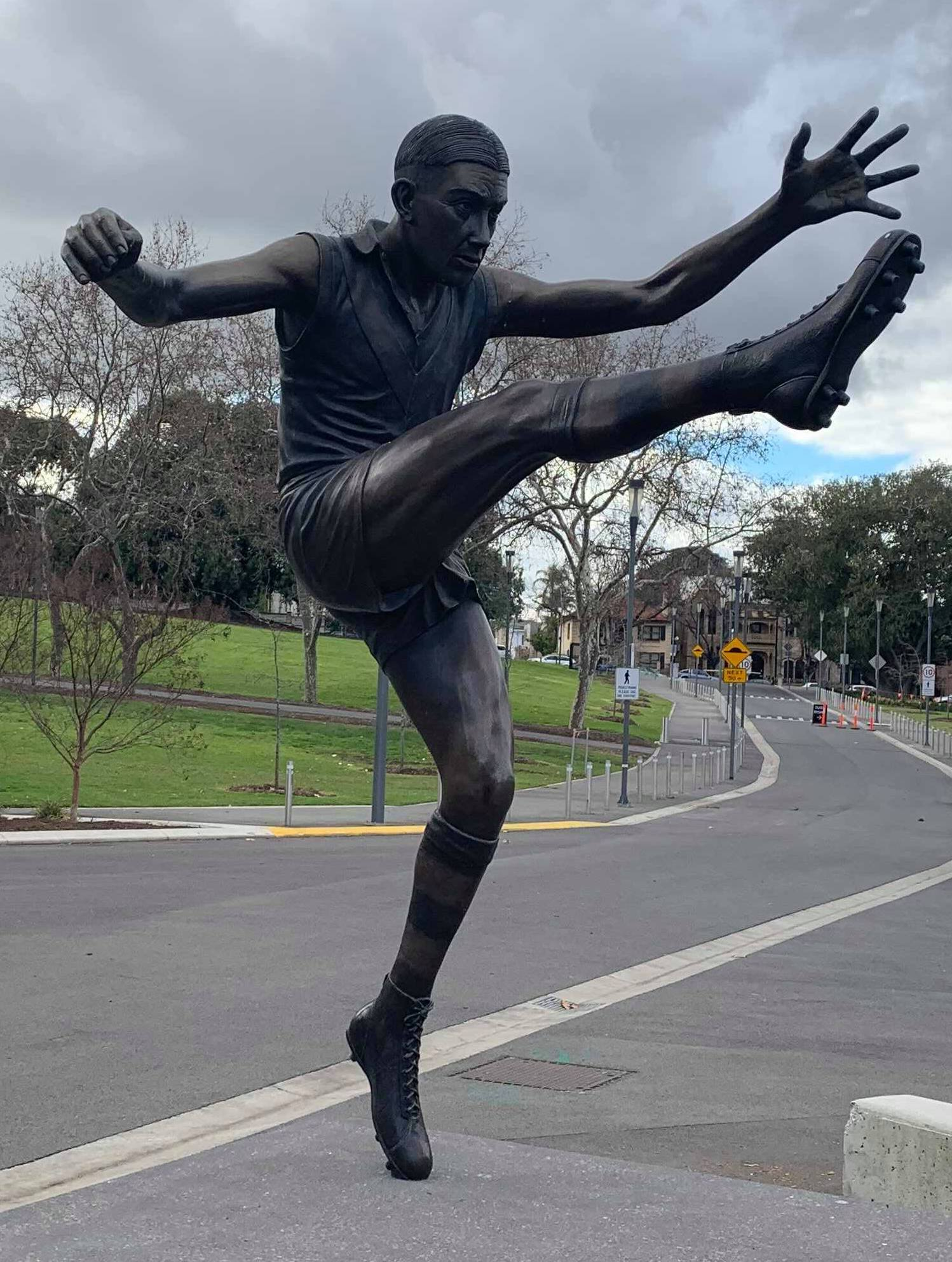
Ken Farmer statue

==== Players ====
Player	Clubs played for	Year inducted
Erin Phillips	Adelaide, Port Adelaide	2025
Peter Darley	South Adelaide	2025
Chris McDermott	Glenelg, Adelaide	2024
Michael Graham	Sturt	2024
Mark Williams	West Adelaide	2023
Michael Aish	Norwood	2023
Tom Leahy	West Adelaide, North Adelaide	2023
Michael Taylor	Norwood	2022
Greg Phillips	Port Adelaide	2020
John Abley	Port Adelaide	2020
Jim Deane	South Adelaide	2019
Simon Goodwin	Adelaide	2017
John Halbert	Sturt	2017
Paul Bagshaw	Sturt	2016
Ben Hart	North Adelaide, Adelaide	2016
Warren Tredrea	Port Adelaide, Port Adelaide	2014
Andrew McLeod	Port Adelaide, Adelaide	2014
Rick Davies	Sturt, South Adelaide	2013
Graham Cornes	Glenelg, South Adelaide	2012
Mark Ricciuto	Adelaide	2011
Wayne Carey	N.Adl, Adelaide	2011
Nathan Buckley	Port Adelaide	2011
Gavin Wanganeen	Port Adelaide	2010
Mark Bickley	South Adelaide, Adelaide	2009
Peter Carey	Glenelg	2009
Geof Motley	Port Adelaide	2008
Murray Weideman	West Adelaide	2007
Darren Jarman	North Adelaide, Adelaide	2007
Craig Bradley	Port Adelaide, Carlton	2006
John Platten	Central District, Hawthorn	2003
Stephen Kernahan	Glenelg, Carlton	2001
Bob Hank	West Torrens	1999
Lindsay Head	West Torrens	1999
Matthew Pavlich	Woodville-West Torrens	1999
Neil Kerley	W. Adel, S. Adel, Glenelg	1997
Bernie Smith	West Adelaide	1996
Walter Scott	Norwood	1996
Dan Moriarty	South Adelaide	1996
Jack 'Dinny' Reedman	S.Adl, N.Adl, W.Adl	1996
Bob Quinn	Port Adelaide	1996
Tom MacKenzie	West Torr., N. Adel	1996
John Daly	Norwood, West Adelaide	1996
Fos Williams	W. Adel, Port Adelaide	1996

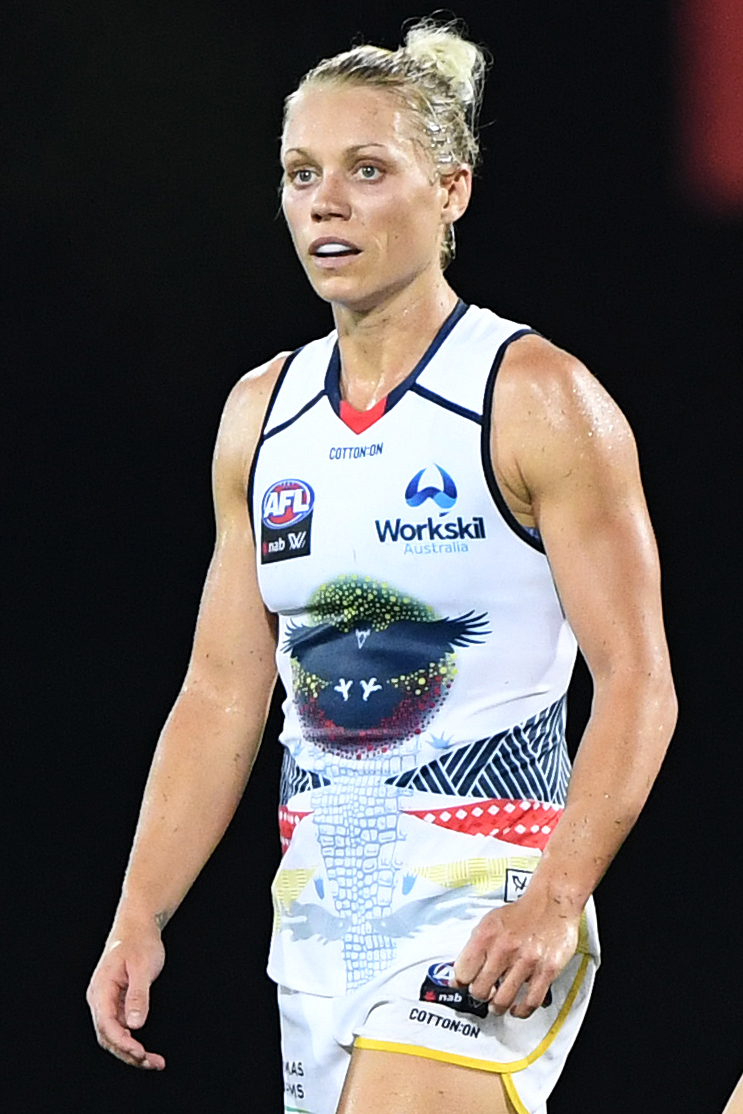
Erin Phillips

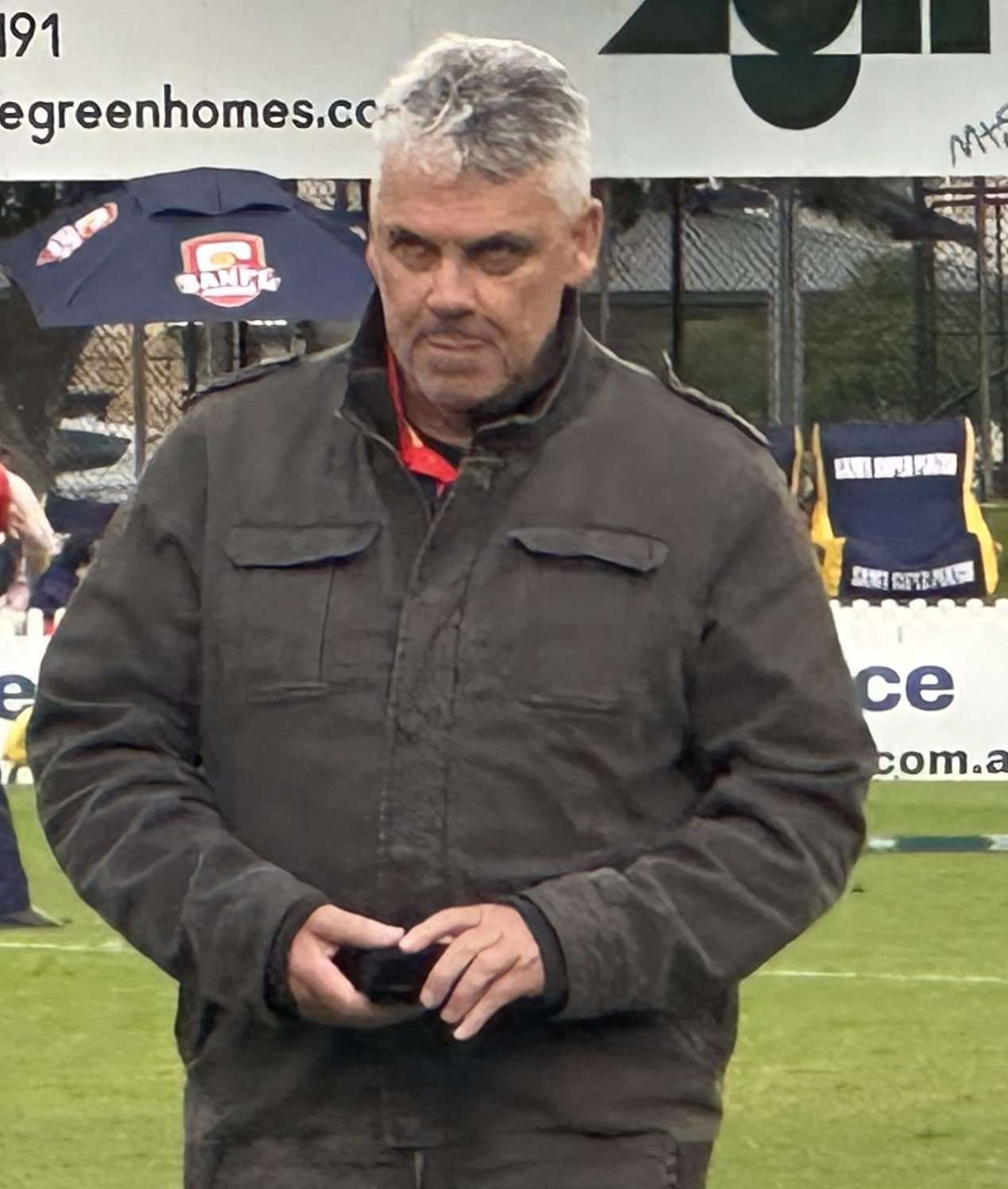
Mark Williams

Tom Leahy

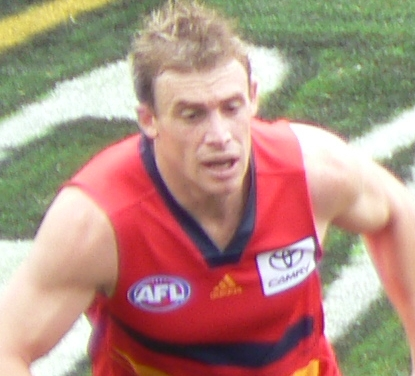
Simon Goodwin

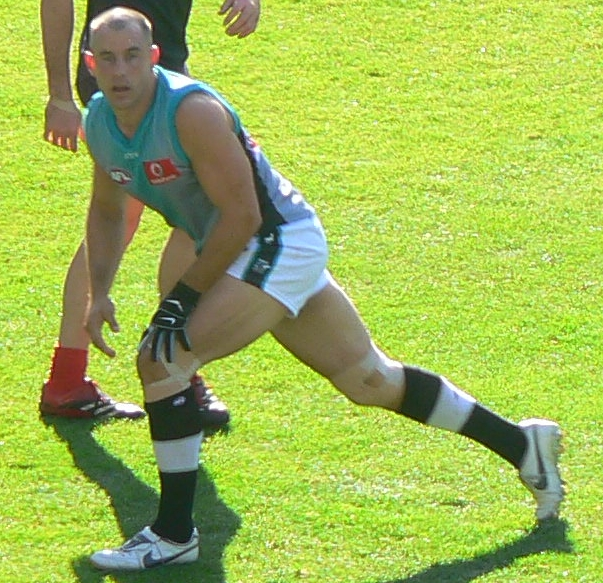
Warren Tredrea

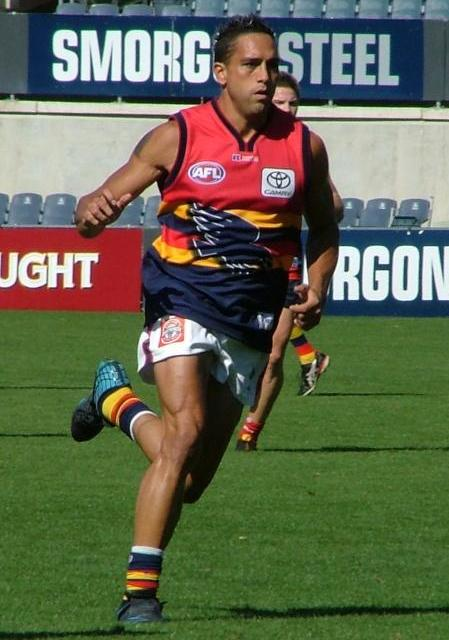
Andrew Mcleod

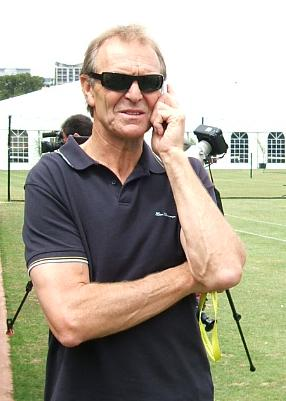
Graham Cornes

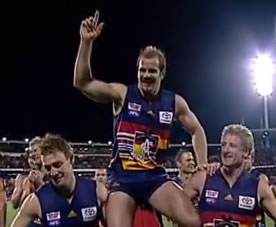
Mark Ricciuto

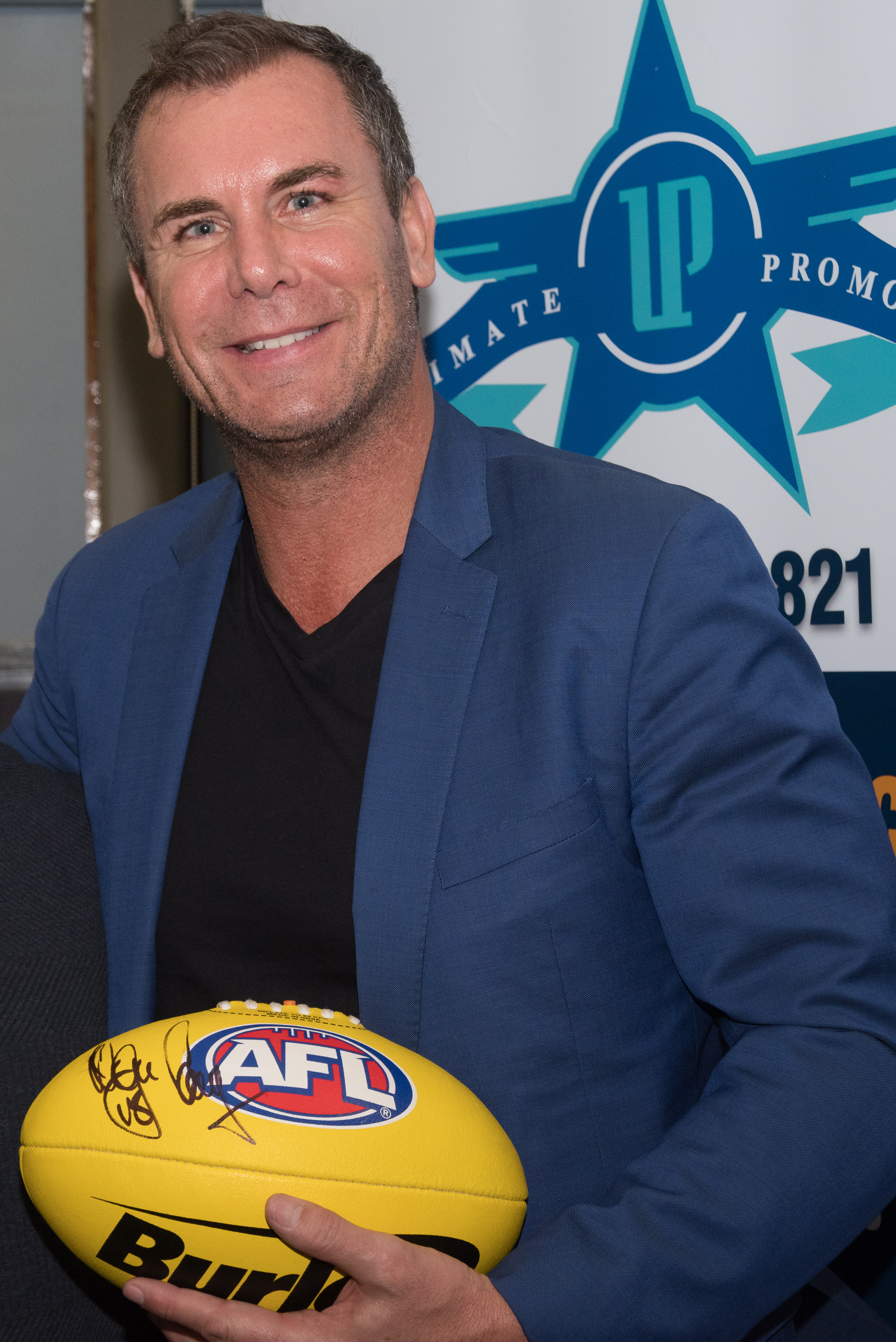
Wayne Carey

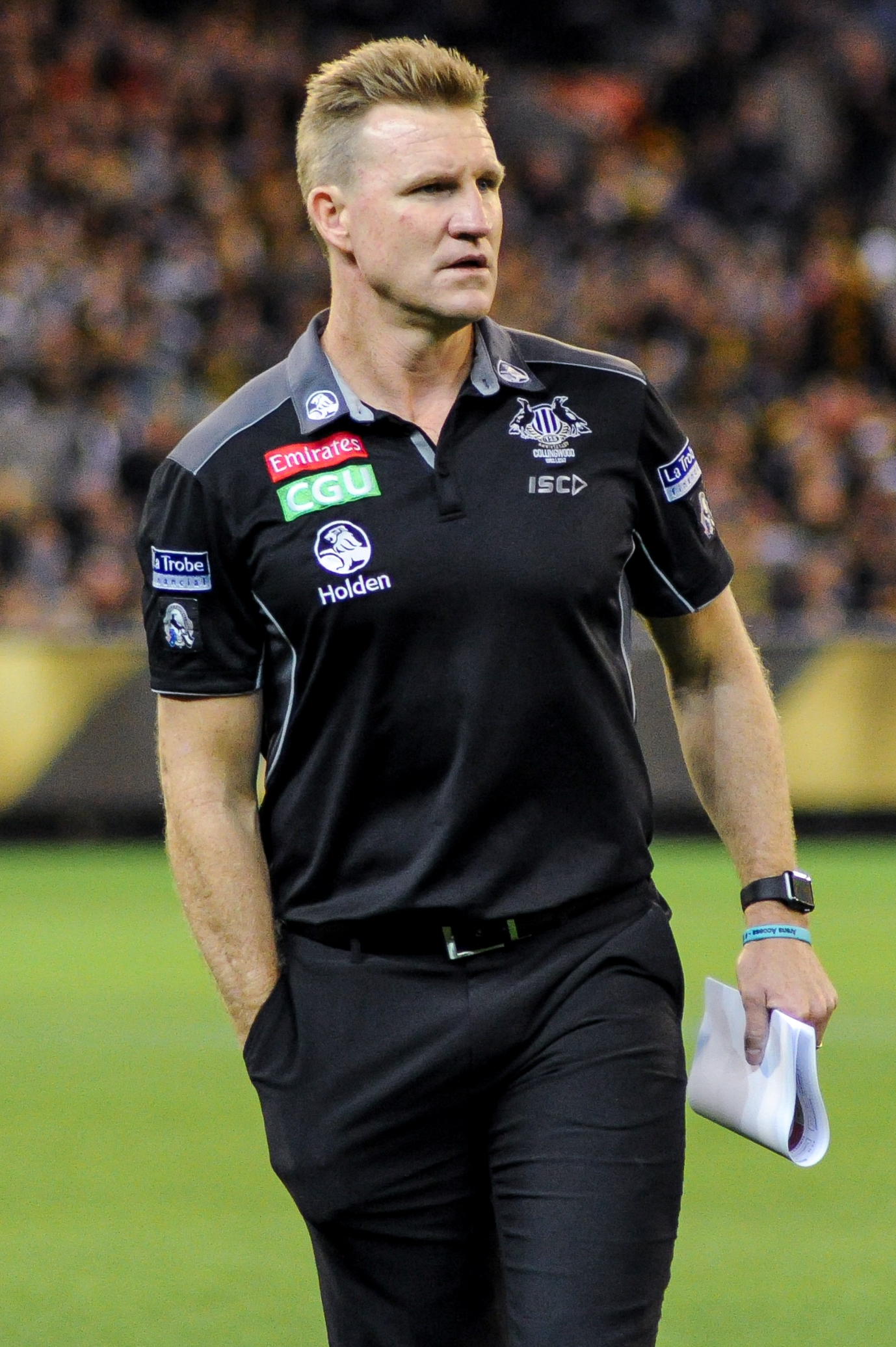
Nathan Buckley

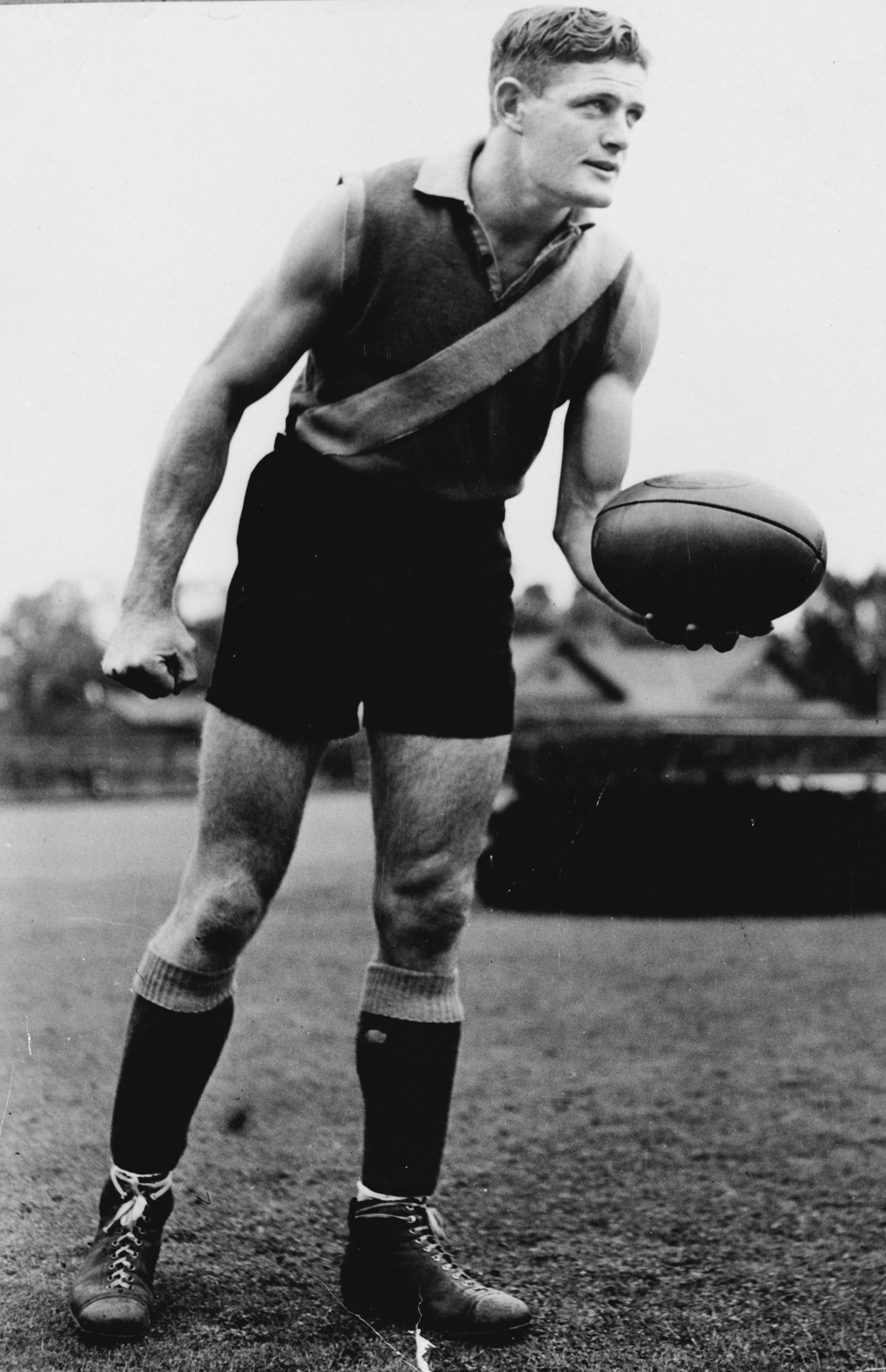
Bob Hank

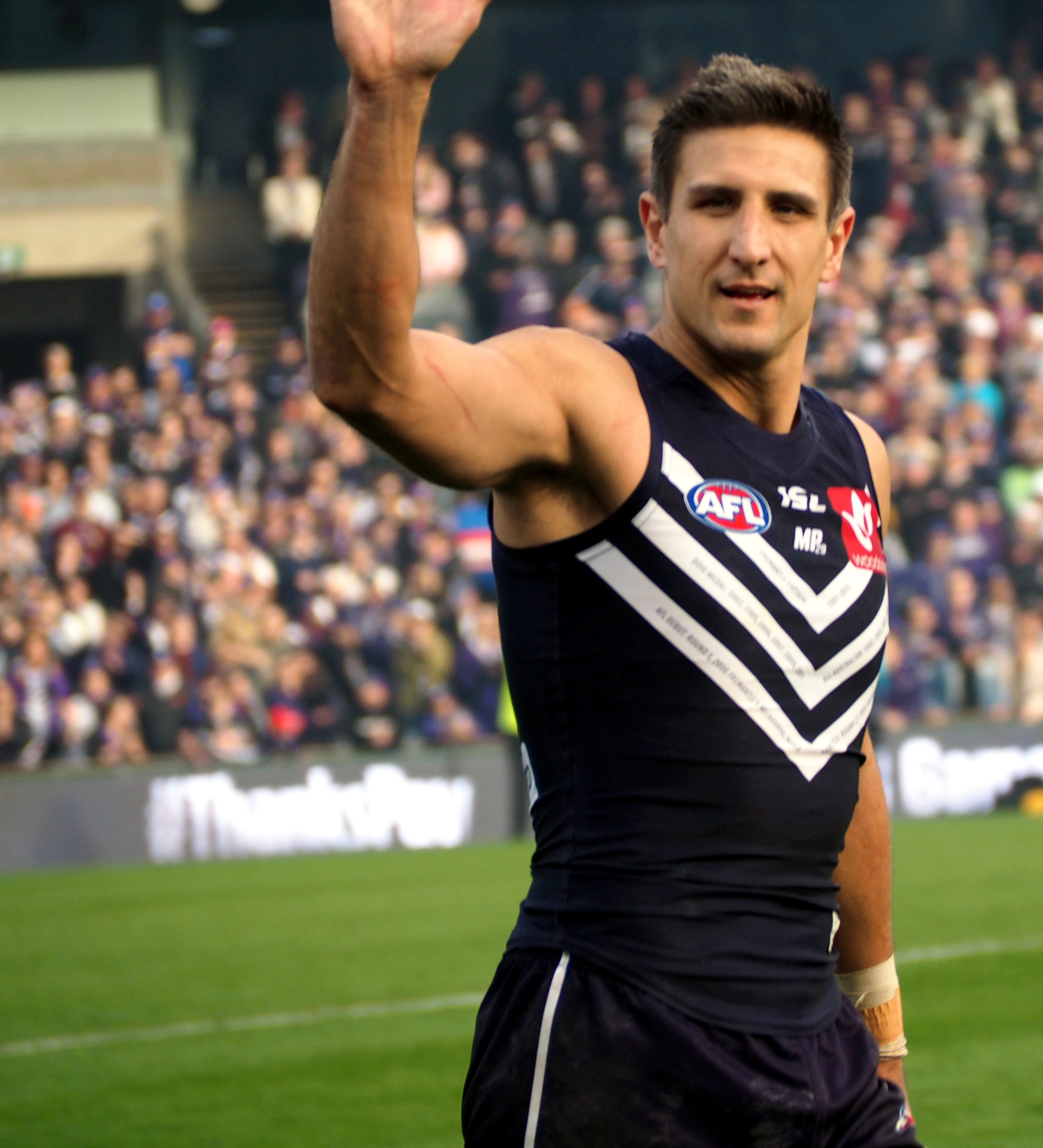
Matthew Pavlich

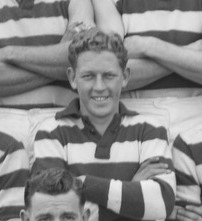
Bernie Smith

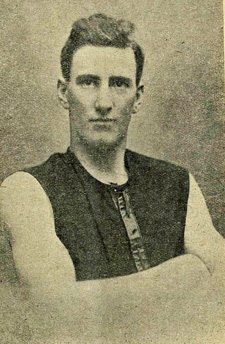
Walter Scott

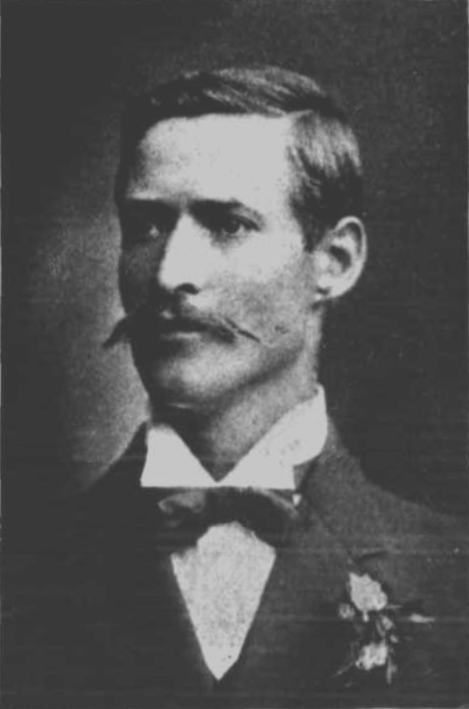
Jack Reedman

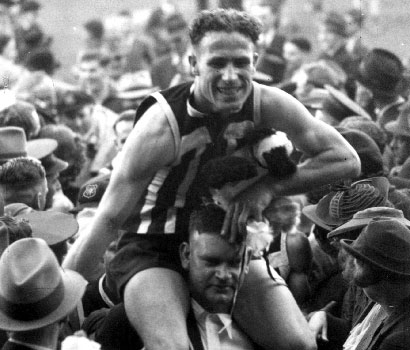
Bob Quinn

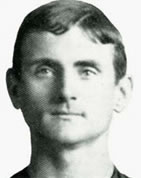
John Daly

==== Umpires ====
- Ken Aplin

==== Coaches ====
- John Cahill
- Jack Oatey
- Fos Williams

==== Administrators ====
- Max Basheer
- Thomas Hill
- Bob McLean

== Governing body ==
The governing body is the South Australian Football Commission.

== Competitions ==
Location of regional governing bodies and active competitions (yellow is competitions run in other jurisdictions with SA clubs with points indicating headquarters or approximate epicentres of SA clubs)

=== Club Competitions ===
==== Men's ====
League	Years of SA clubs or affiliation	Senior SA clubs	Divisions	Headquarters	Notes
South Australian National Football League (SANFL)	1877–	10	2: Senior, Reserve	Adelaide	
Southern Football League (SFL)	1886–	10	3: A Grade, B Grade, C Grade	Noarlunga Downs	
AFL Broken Hill	1890–	0	2: A Grade, Reserve	Broken Hill, New South Wales	Affiliated with the SANFL
Western Eyre Football League (WEFL)	1909–	6	2: A Grade, B Grade	Ceduna	
Riverland Football League (RFL)	1909–	6	2: A Grade, B Grade	Berri	Affiliated with the SANFL
Murray Valley Football Netball League (MVNFL)	2023–	6	1 Senior	Wunkar	
Adelaide Plains Football League (APFL)	1909–	8	2: A Grade, 1 Reserve	Balaklava	Affiliated with the SANFL
Northern Areas Football Association (NAFL)	1909-	6	2: A Grade, 1 Reserve	Booleroo Centre	
Port Lincoln Football League	1910-	6	1: Senior	Port Lincoln	
Great Flinders Football League (GFFL)	1911–	7	4: A Grade, B Grade, Senior Colts, Colts	Cummins	
Adelaide Footy League (AdFL)	1911–	69	23: 8 Senior, 8 Reserve, 7 C-grade	Adelaide	
Whyalla Football League (WFL)	1920–	6	3: A-Grade, Reserve, Colts	Whyalla	
Great Southern Football League (GSFL)	1923–	10	3: A Grade, Reserve, Colts	Victor Harbor	
River Murray Football League (RMFL)	1931–	9	2: Senior, Reserve	Murray Bridge	
North Eastern Football League (NEFL)	1945-	8	2: A Grade, Reserve	Clare	
Kangaroo Island Football League (KIFL)	1946-	5	3: Senior, Reserve, Colts	Kingscote	
Far North Football League (FNFL)	1949-	4	1: Senior	Roxby Downs	
Spencer Gulf Football League (SGFL)	1966–	6	3: Senior, League, Seconds	Port Pirie	
Hills Football League (HFL)	1967–	20	6: Division 1 A Grade, Division 1 B Grade, Country Division A Grade, Country Division B Grade, Colts	Mount Barker	
Eastern Eyre Football League (EEFL)	1985–	5	1 Senior	Cowell	
Barossa Light & Gawler Football Association (BL&GFA)	1987–	9	1 Senior	Lyndoch	
Australian Football League (AFL)	1991–	2	1 Senior	Melbourne, Victoria	Adelaide, Port Adelaide fully professional clubs
Kowree-Naracoorte-Tatiara Football League (KNTFL)	1993-	8	1 Senior	Naracoorte	
Mid South Eastern Football League (MSEFL)	1993-	9	1 Senior	Millicent	
Yorke Peninsula Football League (YPFL)	1995-	9	2: A Grade, Reserve	Wallaroo	
Limestone Coast Football Netball League	2023-	7	1 Senior	Mount Gambier	
APY League	2009-	1	1 Senior	Pukatja	

==== Women's ====
- South Australian Women's Football League Official Site

=== Representative ===
The South Australian Country Football Championships is contested annually, and comprises the following representative sides:

- Central (comprises the Barossa Light and Gawler, Adelaide Plains, Northern Areas, North Eastern and Yorke Peninsula Football Leagues)
- Southern Districts (River Murray, Great Southern, Hills, Southern and Kangaroo Island Football Leagues)
- South East (Kowree Naracoorte Tatiara, Mid South Eastern and Western Border Football Leagues)
- Eyre Peninsula (Port Lincoln, Great Flinders, Eastern Eyre and Far West Football Leagues)
- Northern Cities (Whyalla, Woomera & Districts and Spencer Gulf Football Leagues)
- Murray Mallee Barrier Zone (Riverland, Mid Murray, Broken Hill and Mallee Football Leagues)

== Representative team ==
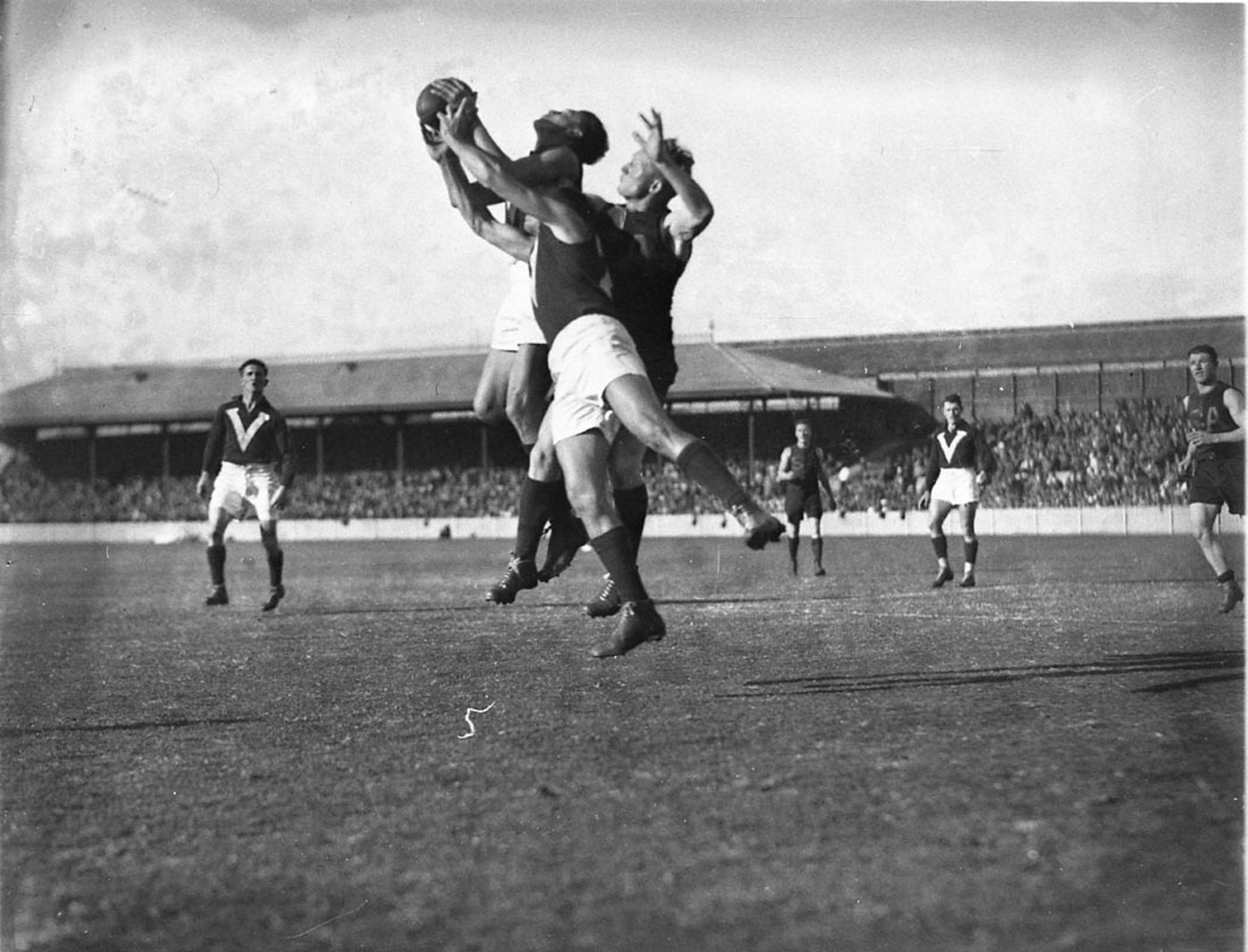
South Australian player contesting a mark against Victoria at the 1933 Australian National Football Carnival

The South Australian representative team, also known as the Croweaters, have played State of Origin matches against all other Australian states.

== Principal venues ==
The following venues meet AFL Standard criteria and have been used to host AFL (National Standard) or AFLW level matches (Regional Standard) or SANFL matches and are listed by capacity.

Adelaide	Adelaide	Adelaide
Adelaide Oval	Norwood Oval	Prospect Oval
Capacity: 53,500	Capacity: 22,000	Capacity: 20,000
Adelaide Oval	Norwood Oval	Prospect Oval
Adelaide	Adelaide	Adelaide
Elizabeth Oval	Thebarton Oval	Alberton Oval
Capacity: 18,000	Capacity: 15,000	Capacity: 15,000
Elizabeth Oval	Thebarton Oval	Alberton Oval
Adelaide	Adelaide	Mount Barker
Glenelg Oval	Unley Oval	Summit Sport and Recreation Park
Capacity: 14,000	Capacity: 10,000	Capacity: 10,000
Glenelg Oval	Unley Oval	
Lyndoch	Mount Gambier	Berri
Barossa Park	Malseed Park	Berri Oval
Capacity: 10,000	Capacity: 7,500	Capacity: 5,000
Barossa Park		Berri Oval

=== Historic Venues ===
- Football Park (1974 - 2015)

== See also ==
- South Australian National Football League
- Australian Football League
- Adelaide Crows
- Port Adelaide Magpies
- Port Adelaide Football Club
- South Australian Football Hall of Fame
