= Kane McAuliffe =

Australian rules footballer (born 2005)

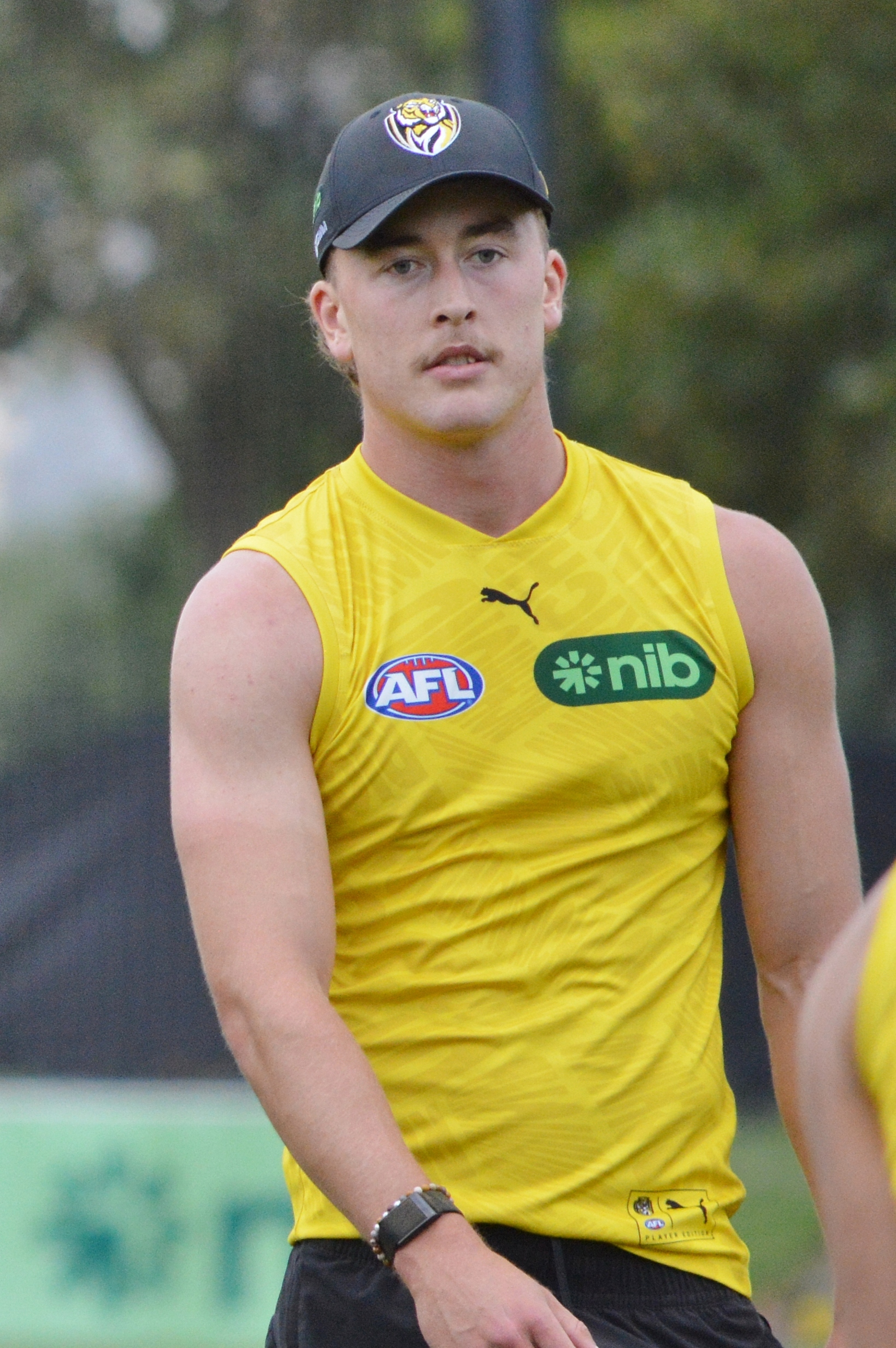
- McAuliffe in March 2026

Personal information
- Full name: Kane James McAuliffe
- Nickname: The Future
- Born: 1 March 2005 (age 21)
- Original team: North Adelaide (SANFL)
- Draft: No. 40, 2023 national draft
- Debut: Round 4, 2024, Richmond vs. St Kilda, at Norwood Oval
- Height: 188 cm (6 ft 2 in)
- Position: Midfielder

Club information
- Current club: Richmond
- Number: 28

Playing career^{1}
Years	Club	Games (Goals)
2024–	Richmond	24 (3)
- ^{1} Playing statistics correct to the end of 2026.

Kane McAuliffe (born 1 March 2005) is a professional Australian rules footballer playing for the Richmond Football Club in the Australian Football League (AFL). He was drafted by Richmond in the 2023 national draft at pick 40 and made his AFL debut in round 4 of the 2024 season.

== Early life and junior football ==
McAuliffe was raised in the regional South Australian coastal town of Port Augusta, 280 kilometres north of Adelaide. He played junior football for the Central Augusta football club in the Spencer Gulf Football League. In addition to his exploits in football, McAuliffe was a talented junior basketball player, being selected to represent the South Australia Country under 16s side at the in 2020 Australian Junior Country Basketball Cup.

At age 14, McAuliffe began boarding at Prince Alfred College in Adelaide. He won the joint best and fairest award in the Sports Association for Adelaide Schools competition as a year 11 student in 2021 while playing football with the school, despite being a year younger than many of his teammates and opponents. During the same time, McAuliffe played representative football with the under 16s team at North Adelaide Football Club where he served as team vice-captain.

By 2022, McAuliffe was named his captain of his school team, leading the side to a defeat in the competition grand final that season. He played with North Adelaide's under 18 team the same year, including in the league grand final.

In 2023 McAuliffe joined the AFL Academy development program, through which he trained with Adelaide's AFL side through January of that year. He later played two showcase matches with the Academy side, against the reserves sides of Carlton and Port Adelaide. He impressed at under 18 level for North Adelaide that year, averaging 27 disposals per game at the level, before earning selection to the club's SANFL reserves side in the latter part of the year, where he averaged 19 disposals and 6.6 tackles per game. During the season, he was hampered by a recurring groin injury.

McAuliffe was selected to represent his state at the 2023 Under 18 national championships, playing in all four matches and averaging 18 disposals, eight tables and four clearances per game.

At the AFL draft combine, McAuliffe recorded the fifth fastest time that year in the 20 metre sprint (2.93 seconds) and placed third in the running vertical jump test (95 cm).

== AFL career ==
McAuliffe was drafted by Richmond with the club's first selection and the 40th pick overall in the 2023 AFL draft.

He began his first year by playing with the club's reserves side in the Victorian Football League. He was a standout player in each of the team's first two matches, averaging 30 disposals, seven clearances and six tackles per game. That strong form saw McAuliffe selected to make his top-level AFL debut in round 4 of the 2024 season. McAuliffe finished the year having played nine matches at AFL level, along with six matches in the VFL.

== Player profile ==
McAuliffe plays as a ball-winning inside midfielder. He is a left-foot kicker.

== Personal life ==
McAuliffe’s father played reserves grade and under 17 football with Port Adelaide.

== Statistics ==
Updated to the end of round 22, 2026.

Legend
G	Goals	K	Kicks	D	Disposals	T	Tackles
B	Behinds	H	Handballs	M	Marks

Season	Team	No.	Games	Totals							Averages (per game)							Votes
Season	Team	No.	Games	G	B	K	H	D	M	T	G	B	K	H	D	M	T	Votes
2024	Richmond	28	9	0	2	36	67	103	8	25	0.0	0.2	4.0	7.4	11.4	0.9	2.8	0
2025	Richmond	28	5	0	4	36	56	92	20	24	0.0	0.8	7.2	11.2	18.4	4.0	4.8	0
2026	Richmond	28	9	3	2	97	71	168	24	30	0.3	0.2	10.8	7.9	18.7	2.7	3.3	0
Career			23	3	8	169	194	363	52	79	0.1	0.3	7.3	8.4	15.8	2.3	3.4	0
