= Whyalla Football League =

Whyalla Football League Inc.
- Current season, competition or edition: 2024
- Sport: Australian rules football
- Founded: 1920; 106 years ago
- No. of teams: 7
- Country: Australia
- Confederation: SANFL
- Most recent champion: Roopena (2026)
- Most titles: Central Whyalla (29)
- Website: whyallafootball.com.au

The Whyalla Football League Inc. is an Australian rules football competition based in the town of Whyalla on the east coast of the Eyre Peninsula region of South Australia.
It is an affiliated member of the South Australian National Football League (SANFL).

== Uniforms ==
Central Whyalla	North Whyalla	Roopena	South Whyalla	Weeroona Bay	West Whyalla

== Clubs ==
=== Locations ===
Locations of the Whyalla FL clubs. Pogs represent locations of the clubs themselves, not their home grounds.

=== Current ===
Club	Colours	Nickname	Former League	Est.	Years in WFL	WFL Senior Premierships	
Club	Colours	Nickname	Former League	Est.	Years in WFL	Total	Years
Central Whyalla		Roosters	SGFL	1920	1920-1960, 1967-	29	1920, 1921, 1929, 1934, 1935, 1937, 1938, 1940, 1941, 1945, 1947, 1953, 1956, 1974, 1975, 1980, 1982, 1989, 1999, 2000, 2001, 2002, 2003, 2004, 2006, 2007, 2020, 2021, 2022, 2025
North Whyalla		Magpies	SGFL	1919	1920-1960, 1967-	18	1932, 1936, 1939, 1941, 1942, 1943, 1948, 1950, 1951, 1954, 1955, 1966*, 1977, 1978, 1979, 2008, 2011, 2014, 2015
Roopena		Roos	–	1968	1970	9	1986, 1988, 1990, 1991, 1992, 1997, 2009, 2010, 2024, 2026
South Whyalla		Demons	SGFL	1919	1920-1960, 1967-	13	1927, 1928, 1931, 1933, 1944, 1946, 1949, 1952, 1961*, 1962*, 1964*, 1965*, 1968, 1981, 1984, 1993, 1994
Weeroona Bay		Tigers	–	1970	1970	4	1985, 1987, 1995, 1996
West Whyalla (Army West 1941-44)		Dragons	SGFL	1941	1941-1960, 1967-	22	1957, 1958, 1959, 1960, 1963, 1967, 1969, 1970, 1971, 1972, 1973, 1976, 1983, 1998, 2005, 2012, 2013, 2016, 2017, 2018, 2019, 2023

All games are played at Memorial Oval, Whyalla and Bennett Oval, Whyalla Stuart.

*1961, 1962, 1964, 1965, 1966 premierships won in the Spencer Gulf Football League

=== Former ===
Club	Colours	Nickname	Former League	Est.	Years in WFL	WFL Senior Premierships		Fate
Club	Colours	Nickname	Former League	Est.	Years in WFL	Total	Years	Fate
Iron Baron			–	1930	1930	0	-	Folded
Iron Knob		Knobs	–	1913	1930-1931, 1952	1	1930	Folded

== History ==
The Whyalla Football Association was formed in 1920 with founding clubs Central Whyalla, North Whyalla and South Whyalla, although competition has been noted to have occurred prior to this. West Whyalla was formed in 1946 and the competition now had four teams.

In 1961 the Whyalla Football League (together with the Great Northern Football Association and the Port Pirie Football Association) formed the Spencer Gulf Football League.

In 1967 the Whyalla-based clubs left the Spencer Gulf Football League and reformed the Whyalla Football League.

Champion past SANFL players from Whyalla include triple Magarey Medallist Barrie Robran and inaugural Adelaide Crows coach Graham Cornes while 4 time SANFL Premiership coach Neil Kerley spent two seasons as Captain-Coach of the North Whyalla Magpies, leading them to the premiership in both seasons (1954 and 1955).

Former Whyalla footballers who have reached the AFL include Robert Shirley, Robert Pyman, Brett Burton, Isaac Weetra, and Levi Greenwood.

== Premierships ==
- 1920 Central Whyalla
- 1921 South Whyalla
- 1922-26 No competition
- 1927 South Whyalla
- 1928 South Whyalla
- 1929 Central Whyalla
- 1930 Iron Knob
- 1931 South Whyalla
- 1932 North Whyalla
- 1933 South Whyalla
- 1934 Central Whyalla
- 1935 Central Whyalla
- 1936 North Whyalla
- 1937 Central Whyalla
- 1938 Central Whyalla
- 1939 North Whyalla
- 1940 Central Whyalla
- 1941 North Whyalla
- 1942 North Whyalla
- 1943 North Whyalla
- 1944 South Whyalla
- 1945 Central Whyalla
- 1946 South Whyalla
- 1947 Central Whyalla
- 1948 North Whyalla
- 1949 South Whyalla
- 1950 North Whyalla
- 1951 North Whyalla
- 1952 South Whyalla
- 1953 Central Whyalla
- 1954 North Whyalla
- 1955 North Whyalla
- 1956 Central Whyalla
- 1957 West Whyalla
- 1958 West Whyalla
- 1959 West Whyalla
- 1960 West Whyalla
- 1967 West Whyalla
- 1968 South Whyalla
- 1969 West Whyalla
- 1970 West Whyalla
- 1971 West Whyalla
- 1972 West Whyalla
- 1973 West Whyalla
- 1974 Central Whyalla
- 1975 Central Whyalla
- 1976 West Whyalla
- 1977 North Whyalla
- 1978 North Whyalla
- 1979 North Whyalla
- 1980 Central Whyalla
- 1981 South Whyalla
- 1982 Central Whyalla
- 1983 West Whyalla
- 1984 South Whyalla
- 1985 Weeroona Bay
- 1986 Roopena
- 1987 Weeroona Bay
- 1988 Roopena
- 1989 Central Whyalla
- 1990 Roopena
- 1991 Roopena
- 1992 Roopena
- 1993 South Whyalla
- 1994 South Whyalla
- 1995 Weeroona Bay
- 1996 Weeroona Bay
- 1997 Roopena
- 1998 West Whyalla
- 1999 Central Whyalla
- 2000 Central Whyalla
- 2001 Central Whyalla
- 2002 Central Whyalla
- 2003 Central Whyalla
- 2004 Central Whyalla
- 2005 West Whyalla
- 2006 Central Whyalla
- 2007 Central Whyalla
- 2008 North Whyalla
- 2009 Roopena
- 2010 Roopena
- 2011 North Whyalla
- 2012 West Whyalla
- 2013 West Whyalla
- 2014 North Whyalla
- 2015 North Whyalla
- 2016 West Whyalla
- 2017 West Whyalla
- 2018 West Whyalla
- 2019 West Whyalla
- 2020 Central Whyalla
- 2021 Central Whyalla
- 2022 Central Whyalla
- 2023 West Whyalla
- 2024 Roopena
- 2025 Central Whyalla
- 2026 Roopena

== Team of the Century ==
In 2001 the Whyalla Football League selected its Team of the Century.

Whyalla Football League Team of the Century 1900-1999
B:	Laurie Bade	Ian McKay	Clarrie Window
HB:	Jack Wallis	Colin Herbert	Jack Dempsey
C:	Lyall Kretschmer	Jack Broadstock	Don Hewett
HF:	Darrol Foote	Barrie Robran	Reg Hocking
F:	Ron Hart	Mick Kellaher	Ron Boothey
Foll:	Jim Mitchell	Neil Kerley (vc)	John McInerney (c)
Int:	Alf Aikman	Denis Donovan	Harry Nicholson
Int:	Clarrie Smoker		
Coach:	John McInerney		

== 2012 Ladder ==
Whyalla	Wins	Byes	Losses	Draws	For	Against	%	Pts	Final	Team	G	B	Pts	Team	G	B	Pts
West Whyalla	16	0	2	0	1921	712	72.96%	32	1st Semi	Roopena	13	8	86	Central Whyalla	11	14	80
North Whyalla	13	0	5	0	1258	983	56.14%	26	2nd Semi	West Whyalla	13	13	91	North Whyalla	8	8	56
Central Whyalla	8	0	10	0	1219	1202	50.35%	16	Preliminary	North Whyalla	15	14	104	Roopena	8	6	54
Roopena	8	0	10	0	1272	1403	47.55%	16	Grand	West Whyalla	8	8	56	North Whyalla	6	1	37
Weerona Bay	5	0	13	0	1072	1683	38.91%	10									
South Whyalla	4	0	14	0	1029	1788	36.53%	8									

== 2013 Ladder ==
Whyalla	Wins	Byes	Losses	Draws	For	Against	%	Pts	Final	Team	G	B	Pts	Team	G	B	Pts
Central Whyalla	14	0	4	0	1813	1043	63.48%	28	1st Semi	North Whyalla	19	11	125	Weerona Bay	11	6	72
West Whyalla	14	0	4	0	1818	1073	62.88%	28	2nd Semi	West Whyalla	25	5	155	Central Whyalla	16	12	108
Weerona Bay	12	0	6	0	1948	1065	64.65%	24	Preliminary	Central Whyalla	13	9	87	North Whyalla	5	6	36
North Whyalla	9	0	9	0	1405	1118	55.69%	18	Grand	West Whyalla	10	17	77	Central Whyalla	7	12	54
South Whyalla	4	0	14	0	810	1929	29.57%	8									
Roopena	1	0	17	0	694	2260	23.49%	2									

== 2014 Ladder ==
Whyalla	Wins	Byes	Losses	Draws	For	Against	%	Pts	Final	Team	G	B	Pts	Team	G	B	Pts
North Whyalla	17	0	0	0	1931	458	80.83%	34	1st Semi	Roopena	14	10	94	Weerona Bay	10	12	72
West Whyalla	12	0	4	1	1418	997	58.72%	25	2nd Semi	North Whyalla	18	20	128	West Whyalla	5	5	35
Weerona Bay	9	0	8	0	1080	1135	48.76%	18	Preliminary	West Whyalla	24	14	158	Roopena	6	5	41
Roopena	7	0	10	0	1089	1442	43.03%	14	Grand	North Whyalla	18	16	124	West Whyalla	3	4	22
Central Whyalla	4	0	13	0	883	1606	35.48%	8									
South Whyalla	1	0	15	1	975	1738	35.94%	3									

== See also ==
- Alan Didak
- Levi Greenwood

== Books ==
- Encyclopedia of South Australian country football clubs, compiled by Peter Lines. ISBN 9780980447293
- South Australian country football digest by Peter Lines ISBN 9780987159199
