= Spencer Gulf Football League =

Australian rules football league

- Current season, competition or edition: 2026 SGL season
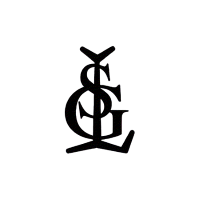
- Sport: Australian rules football
- Founded: 1961; 65 years ago
- First season: 1961
- No. of teams: 6
- Region: South Australia
- Most titles: Port (14 premierships)
- Current premiers: Port (14th premiership) (2026)
- Website: sgfl.net

The Spencer Gulf Football League is an Australian rules football competition based at the head of the Spencer Gulf in South Australia. It is an affiliated member of the South Australian National Football League.

The Spencer Gulf Football League was formed in 1961, via a merger of the Port Pirie Football League (PPFL), the Whyalla Football League (WFL), and the Port Augusta-based Great Northern Football Association (GNFA). At the end of the 1966 season the WFL contingent withdrew.

== Brief history ==
In 1961 the Great Northern Football Association, the Port Pirie Football Association and the Whyalla Football League merged to form the Spencer Gulf Football League. The twelve founding clubs were Central Augusta, Central Whyalla, North Whyalla, Port, Proprietary, Risdon, Solomontown, South Augusta, South Whyalla, West Augusta, West Whyalla and Willsden.

The four Whyalla-based clubs left the Spencer Gulf Football League at the end of season 1966 to form the Whyalla Football League, leaving 8 teams from Port Augusta and Port Pirie.

In 1992 Willsden amalgamated with Quorn to form Quorn-Willsden Wolves. The league reverted to 7 teams in 1994 when Proprietary and Risdon amalgamated. In 2006 the league was cut down to 6 teams when the Quorn-Willsden Wolves folded due to financial woes.

== Clubs ==
=== Current ===
Club	Colours	Nickname	Home Ground	Former League	Est.	Years in SGFL	SGFL Senior Premierships	
Club	Colours	Nickname	Home Ground	Former League	Est.	Years in SGFL	Total	Years
Central Augusta		Bloods	ETSA Oval, Port Augusta	GNFA	1915	1961-	8	1978, 1980, 1982, 1991, 1992, 2009, 2010, 2011
Port		Bulldogs	Port Oval, Port Pirie South	PPFA	1941	1961-	14	1961, 1965, 1966, 1967, 1970, 1997, 1998, 1999, 2002, 2003, 2004, 2007, 2008, 2026
Proprietary-Risdon		Lions	Memorial Oval, Port Pirie	–	1994	1994-	4	2015, 2021, 2023, 2024
Solomontown		Cats	Memorial Oval, Port Pirie	PPFA	1893	1961-	7	1984, 1988, 1990, 1994, 2014, 2022, 2025
South Augusta		Bulldogs	Central Oval, Port Augusta	GNFA	1912	1961-	13	1964, 1981, 1983, 1993, 1994, 2000, 2006, 2012, 2016, 2017, 2018, 2019, 2020
West Augusta		Hawks	Chinnery Park, Port Augusta West	GNFA	1915	1961-	12	1969, 1972, 1973, 1974, 1975, 1976, 1985, 1987, 1989, 1996, 2005, 2013

=== Former ===
Colours	Club	Nickname	Home Ground	Former League	Est.	Years in SGFL	SGFL Senior Premierships		Fate
Colours	Club	Nickname	Home Ground	Former League	Est.	Years in SGFL	Total	Years	Fate
Central Whyalla		Roosters	Memorial Park, Whyalla	WFL	1961	1961-1966	0	–	Re-formed Whyalla FL in 1967
North Whyalla		Magpies	Memorial Park, Whyalla	WFL	1961	1961-1966	0	–	Re-formed Whyalla FL in 1967
Proprietary		Panthers	Memorial Oval, Port Pirie	PPFA	1890s	1961-1994	3	1968, 1971, 1977	Merged with Risdon to form Proprietary-Risdon following 1993 season
Quorn-Willsden		Wolves	Quorn Oval, Quorn	–	1993	1993-2006	1	2001	Folded due to financial difficulties in 2006
Risdon		Tigers	Memorial Oval, Port Pirie	–	1961	1961-1994	1	1979	Merged with Proprietary to form Proprietary-Risdon following 1993 season
South Whyalla		Demons	Memorial Park, Whyalla	WFL	1961	1961-1966	1	1962	Re-formed Whyalla FL in 1967
West Whyalla		Dragons	Memorial Park, Whyalla	WFL	1961	1961-1966	1	1963	Re-formed Whyalla FL in 1967
Willsden		Wolves	ETSA Oval, Port Augusta	GNFA	1957	1961-1992	1	1986	Merged with Quorn to form Quorn-Willsden following 1992 season

== Premierships ==
- 1961 – Port
- 1962 – South Whyalla
- 1963 – West Whyalla
- 1964 – South Augusta
- 1965 – Port
- 1966 – Port
- 1967 – Port
- 1968 – Proprietary
- 1969 – West Augusta
- 1970 – Port
- 1971 – Proprietary
- 1972 – West Augusta
- 1973 – West Augusta
- 1974 – West Augusta
- 1975 – West Augusta
- 1976 – West Augusta
- 1977 – Proprietary
- 1978 – Central Augusta
- 1979 – Risdon
- 1980 – Central Augusta
- 1981 – South Augusta
- 1982 – Central Augusta
- 1983 – South Augusta
- 1984 – Solomontown
- 1985 – West Augusta
- 1986 – Willsden
- 1987 – West Augusta
- 1988 – Solomontown
- 1989 – West Augusta
- 1990 – Solomontown
- 1991 – Central Augusta
- 1992 – Central Augusta
- 1993 – South Augusta
- 1994 – South Augusta
- 1995 – Solomontown
- 1996 – West Augusta
- 1997 – Port
- 1998 – Port
- 1999 – Port
- 2000 – South Augusta
- 2001 – Quorn-Willsden
- 2002 – Port
- 2003 – Port
- 2004 – Port
- 2005 – West Augusta
- 2006 – South Augusta
- 2007 – Port
- 2008 – Port
- 2009 – Central Augusta
- 2010 – Central Augusta
- 2011 – Central Augusta
- 2012 – South Augusta
- 2013 – West Augusta
- 2014 – Solomontown
- 2015 – Lions
- 2016 – South Augusta
- 2017 – South Augusta
- 2018 – South Augusta
- 2019 – South Augusta
- 2020 – South Augusta
- 2021 – Lions
- 2022 – Solomontown
- 2023 – Lions
- 2024 – Lions
- 2025 – Solomontown
- 2026 – Port

== Madigan Medallist & Ken Mitchell Awards ==
Year	Madigan Medallist	Team	Ken Mitchell Award	Team	Goals
1961	M Vanvacas; D Foote	North Whyalla; Central Whyalla	W Schapel	Ports	61
1962	J Martin	West Augusta	W McGuiness	Ports	46
1963	B Curtis	Proprietary	G Davis	South Whyalla	67
1964	K Haylock	South Whyalla	M Vanvacas	South Whyalla	49
1965	D 'Sam' Donovan	West Whyalla	G Davis	South Whyalla	64
1966	G Cockshell	Risdon	D Pollard	Ports	56
1967	W Virgo	South Augusta	M Minervini	Solomontown	39
1968	M Minervini	Solomontown	G Hill	West Augusta	62
1969	W Virgo	South Augusta	M Minervini	Solomontown	37
1970	C Butler	Solomontown	V Butler	West Augusta	46
1971	C Colligan	Risdon	D Shillabeer	Proprietary	72
1972	J Clarke	Risdon	D Murphy; L Welk	Willsden	46
1973	B Webb	Solomontown	D Shillabeer	South Augusta	65
1974	K McSporran	West Augusta	D Shillabeer	South Augusta	85
1975	K McSporran	West Augusta	K Mitchell	Central Augusta	82
1976	K McSporran	West Augusta	K Mitchell	Central Augusta	92
1977	C Prior	Proprietary	K Mitchell	Central Augusta	98
1978	J Noonan	Willsden	P Manning	Central Augusta	95
1979	K Naudebaum	Central Augusta	S Cheney	Risdon	56
1980	P Hynes	South Augusta	R Vidovich	Proprietary	69
1981	C Cock	South Augusta	D Thornton	Solomontown	74
1982	J Boles	Willsden	R Harris	Ports	80
1983	R Payne	Risdon	R Harris	Ports	95
1984	R Payne	Risdon	D Thornton	Solomontown	77
1985	K McSporran; R Anderson; M Schurnaker	West Augusta; Solomontown; Risdon	P Combe	Proprietary	66
1986	K Arbon	Ports	L Rawlins	Solomontown	68
1987	R Anderson	Solomontown	L Rawlins	Solomontown	85
1988	Mark Bickley	Solomontown	L Rawlins	Solomontown	59
1989	L Myles	Proprietary	L Rawlins	Solomontown	65
1990	C Ferrne	Risdon	D Freeman	Central Augusta	89
1991	S Curnow	Central Augusta	D Bickley	Solomontown	75
1992	J Duffy	Central Augusta	S Wildman	Central Augusta	126
1993	S McLennan	South Augusta	B Minchington	Ports	91
1994	J Simmons	Ports	M Darcy	Central Augusta	46
1995	C Siviour	Solomontown	M Darcy	Solomontown	92
1996	B Fazulla	West Augusta	J Boles	Quorn-Willsden	70
1997	Z McKenzie	Quorn-Willsden	D Mellow	Ports	54
1998	B Fazulla	West Augusta	D Mellow	Ports	77
1999	D Savage	Ports	D Mellow	Ports	60
2000	P Sadler	Proprietary-Risdon Lions	K Allen	Quorn-Willsden	61
2001	K Keeler; T Simpson	South Augusta; Quorn-Willsden	K Allen	Quorn-Willsden	102
2002	J Robinson	Solomontown	V Remphrey	Ports	50
2003	J Martin; M Peek	Quorn-Willsden; Solomontown	D Mellow	Port	58
2004	C Tee	Solomontown	C Pollard	Port	104
2005	C Tee; M Keatley	Solomontown; Central Augusta	K Allen	Quorn-Willsden	102
2006	C Tee	Solomontown	Jarod Reid	Quorn-Willsden	87
2007	M Keatley	Central Augusta	B Amos	South Augusta	106
2008	M Fuller	Central Augusta	T Horsnell	Proprietary-Risdon Lions	56
2009	T Clarke	Ports	M Gale	Ports	68
2010	A Dearlove; R Struck	Ports; South Augusta	A Dearlove	Port	143
2011	T Price	Solomontown	R Morris	Central	66
2012	G Cook; L Schmidt		S McIntyre	Solomontown	78
2013	D Rogers	Proprietary-Risdon Lions	H Warren	West	82
2014	R Giles	Proprietary-Risdon Lions	H Warren	West	69
2015	N Collins	West Augusta	B Inglis	Port	42
2016	J Fuller	Proprietary-Risdon Lions	B Colson	South	54
2017	D Kildea	South Augusta	B Colson	South	75
2018	A Stuart	South Augusta	L Brown	South	82
2019	D Kildea	South Augusta	T Horsnell	Proprietary-Risdon Lions	55
2020	L Edwards	Proprietary-Risdon Lions	L Edwards	Proprietary-Risdon Lions	36
2021	J Hayes	Solomontown	L Edwards	Proprietary-Risdon Lions	67
2022	C Davey	Solomontown	A Jacobs	Proprietary-Risdon Lions	43
2023	C Davey	Solomontown	A Jacobs	Proprietary-Risdon Lions	69
2024	N Kraemer; A Oliphant	Proprietary-Risdon Lions	M Caputo	Solomontown	52
2025	A Coe	Ports	H Wallace	Proprietary-Risdon Lions	64
2026	L Paparella	South Augusta	J Kovacic	Solomontown	49

== AFL representatives ==
The Spencer Gulf League has been home to many AFL Footballers including:

== Mark Bickley (Adelaide Crows, 1991–2003) ==
Played his junior football for the Solomontown Football club and was a premiership player with the club in 1988, in that same year he won the Madigan Medal at the age of 19. Mark moved to the South Adelaide Football Club in the South Australian National Football League (SANFL), where he was then selected as an inaugural member of the Adelaide Crows squad in 1991. In 1997 Bickley was appointed captain of the Adelaide Football Club, and captained the 1997 and 1998 Adelaide premiership sides. He is now a member of the SANFL Hall of Fame.

== Jared Rivers (Melbourne Demons, 2003–2015) ==
Played junior football for the South Augusta Football Club and won a premiership with the club in 2000 at the age of 15. Jared was selected by the Melbourne Demons as the 26th pick overall in the National Draft of 2002. In 2004 he won the National Bank Rising Star.

== Mark Jamar (Melbourne Demons, 2003–2016) ==
Played his early football at the Lions Football Club before moving to North Adelaide in the SANFL. Mark was selected at pick 6 of the 2001 Rookie Draft by the Melbourne Demons. In 2010 he was named as the second ruckman for the All-Australian squad.

== Connor Rozee (Port Adelaide, 2019-present) ==
Played his junior football with the South Augusta Football Club before moving to North Adelaide in the SANFL. He was selected by the Port Adelaide Football Club with pick 5 in the 2018 AFL National Draft. In his first year, he was Port Adelaide’s leading goal kicker with 29 goals and also won the Gavin Wanganeen Medal. He claimed the John Cahill Medal in 2022, was named in the All-Australian team in both 2022 and 2023, and won the Showdown Medal in 2022 and 2025. In 2024, Connor was announced as Port Adelaide’s captain.

== Grand Final results ==
Grand Final on 19 September 2015 Lions 5.4 8.6 11.11 16.15 (111) Central 1.1 2.3 6.8 9.11 (65) Best: Lions – T. Dunkley, R. Eyre, T. Harmer, J. Fuller, T. Bradley. Central – G. Appleton, A. Ruffles, A. Parsons, M. Harvey, M. Fuller. Goals: Lions – T. Bradley 4, J. Fuller 2, J. Strawbridge 2, S. Dyer, K. Edwards, T. Ley, A. Slattery, C. Marsland, L. Patterson, S. Edwards, T. Dunkley. Central – J. Reid 4, J. Muirhead 2, M. Harvey, A. Hosking, G. Appleton

Grand Final on 20 September 2014 West 1.4 1.7 4.9 7.11 (53) Solomontown 1.2 4.6 6.7 8.10 (58) Best: Sollies – L. Bearman, B. Schutte, Z. Siemer, G. Cooke, R. Hoare. West – not av. Goals: Sollies – M. O'Brien 2, K. Head 2, J. Head, L. Bearman, T. Hoare, B. Mudge. West – H. Warren 5, T. Starke-Treloar 2

21 September 2013 West 3.4 9.6 12.7 16.8 (104) Central 2.1 4.1 9.2 15.6 (96) Best: West – J. Jackson, T. Warren, S. Page, N. Collins, R. Dadleh. Central – L. Button, M. Fuller, M. Turner, N. Callary, S. Watts. Goals: West – S. Page 6, T. Starke-Treloar 2, H. Warren 2, N. Collins 2, M. Anesbury 2, R. Stapleton, J. Coulthard. Central – L. Button 4, D. Shillabeer 3, J. Reid 2, A. Ruffles 2, M. Harvey, M. Turner, J. Little, S. Watts

22 September 2012 South 3.3 5.4 10.8 15.8 (98) Sollies 2.5 3.7 8.10 9.12 (66) Best: South – A. Margitich, M. Horner, R. Struck, B. Hurt, B. Laube, S. Brusnahan . Sollies – J. Davies, C. Millard, R. Saracino, Z. Siemer, S. Malchow. . Goals: South – B. Trewartha 3, B. Cox 2, T. Kernahan 2, C. Heron 2, D. Dohnt 2, L. Schmidt, J. Lukich, M. Horner, T. Payne. Sollies – S. McIntyre 2, J. Davies 2, B. Goodridge, N. Redman, L. Bearman, C. Millard, T. Hoare

24 September 2011 Central 4.3 7.5 9.7 11.10 (76) Port 1.0 4.0 6.1 8.3 (51) Best: Central – G. Kenny, P. Byron-Boles, R. Morris, S. Watts, C. Johnston. Port – J. Penny, C. Stephens, N. Magor, C. Brooke, C. Smith. Goals: Central – R. Morris 6, J. Reid, M. Woolford, L. Donald, D. Shillabeer, P. Byron-Boles. Port – G. Phillips 2, A. Casey 2, C. Smith 2, M. Gale, B. Mudge

18 September 2010 Central 1.1 6.2 9.3 11.4 (70) South 2.7 4.7 7.15 7.17 (59) Best: Central – N. Callary, J. Jackson, R. Morris, P. Jackson, J. Reid. South – B. Jones, D. Dohnt, B. Cox, M. Gill, M. Curley. Goals: Central – R. Morris 5, A. Grantham, G. Hull, P. Byron-Boles, D. Shillabeer, P. Jackson, K. McKenzie . South – B. Cox 2, S. Feltus, C. Reid, C. Heron, B. Jones, T. Kernahan

2009

Central 12.6 (78) def Port 8.15 (63)

- Best: Central – M Fuller, J Dodd, A Fullerton, J Quigley, S Dawson. Port – C Stephens, T Clarke, K Johnanson, C Smith, M Burford.
- Goals: Central – R Morris 3, S Dawson, J Reid 2, R Clayton-Waye, S Curnow, M Fuller, M Harvey, A McKenzie. Port – G Phillips 3, S Treloar, T Clarke, J Clarke, M Gale

2008

Port 10.10 (70) def Central 8.21 (69)

- Best: Port – A Casey, M Burford, N Wombat, A Featherstonaugh, J Coombe. Central – A Williams, N Callary, T O’Connor, L Rathman, M Keatley.
- Goals: Port – G Phillips 4, N Wombat 3, J Coombe 2, A Casey. Central – S Dawson, S Wilson, M Fuller, D Baker, J Dodd, K Allen, N Lawrence

2007

Port 16.8 (104) def West 11.15 (81)

- Best: Port – N Wombat, S Treloar, M Burford, A Waters, C Stephens. West – Not Available.
- Goals: Port – B Mudge, A Bergsma 3, S Treloar, J Coombe 2, L Copley, A Fleming, S Humphreys, M Kendall. West – R McDonald, J Coulthard, R Dadleh 2, R Stapledon, C McKenzie, J Carn, H Warren, M Benbow

2006

South 16.13 (109) def Central 7.6 (48)

- Best: South – D Crombie, C Reid, G O’Brien, R Barnes. Central – S McIntyre, M Fuller, B Page, C Pannach
- Goals: South – B Amos 7, D Shillabeer 3, C Heron 2, B Jones, A Grantham, M Grantham, G O’Brien. Central – A Ruffles 3, J Harland 2, D Baker, M Kieboom

== 2007 Ladder ==
Spencer Gulf	Wins	Byes	Losses	Draws	For	Against	%	Pts	Final	Team	G	B	Pts	Team	G	B	Pts
South Augusta	14	0	2	1	2414	1427	62.85%	29	1st Semi	West Augusta	0	15	12	Central Augusta	0	13	11
Port Pirie	12	0	4	1	2286	1384	62.29%	25	2nd Semi	Port Pirie	16	11	107	South Augusta	16	6	102
Central Augusta	10	0	7	0	1866	1848	50.24%	20	Preliminary	West Augusta	18	18	126	South Augusta	10	16	76
West Augusta	7	0	10	0	1746	1893	47.98%	14	Grand	Port Pirie	16	8	104	West Augusta	11	15	81
Solomontown	5	0	12	0	1594	2153	42.54%	10									
Risdon/Proprietary	2	0	15	0	1411	2599	35.19%	4									

== 2008 Ladder ==
Spencer Gulf	Wins	Byes	Losses	Draws	For	Against	%	Pts	Final	Team	G	B	Pts	Team	G	B	Pts
Port Pirie	13	0	4	0	1798	1176	60.46%	26	1st Semi	Central Augusta	24	8	152	Risdon/Proprietary	9	14	68
West Augusta	11	0	6	0	2092	1402	59.87%	22	2nd Semi	Port Pirie	15	16	106	West Augusta	11	21	87
Central Augusta	11	0	6	0	1866	1537	54.83%	22	Preliminary	Central Augusta	18	9	117	West Augusta	12	7	79
Risdon/Proprietary	8	0	9	0	1796	1763	50.46%	16	Grand	Port Pirie	10	10	70	Central Augusta	8	21	69
South Augusta	8	0	9	0	1493	1670	47.20%	16									
Solomontown	0	0	17	0	953	2450	28.00%	0									

== 2009 Ladder ==
Spencer Gulf	Wins	Byes	Losses	Draws	For	Against	%	Pts	Final	Team	G	B	Pts	Team	G	B	Pts
Central Augusta	12	0	5	0	1644	1246	56.89%	24	1st Semi	Risdon/Proprietary	15	6	96	West Augusta	6	7	43
Port Pirie	11	0	6	0	1461	1109	56.85%	22	2nd Semi	Central Augusta	15	9	99	Port Pirie	14	11	95
Risdon/Proprietary	11	0	6	0	1557	1348	53.60%	22	Preliminary	Port Pirie	8	10	58	Risdon/Proprietary	3	8	26
West Augusta	10	0	7	0	1336	1142	53.91%	20	Grand	Central Augusta	12	6	78	Port Pirie	8	15	63
South Augusta	7	0	10	0	1255	1291	49.29%	14									
Solomontown	0	0	17	0	727	1844	28.28%	0									

== 2010 Ladder ==
Spencer Gulf	Wins	Byes	Losses	Draws	For	Against	%	Pts	Final	Team	G	B	Pts	Team	G	B	Pts
South Augusta	14	0	2	1	1612	938	63.22%	29	1st Semi	Central Augusta	10	8	68	Risdon/Proprietary	9	13	67
West Augusta	11	0	6	0	1390	1239	52.87%	22	2nd Semi	South Augusta	12	6	78	West Augusta	7	13	55
Risdon/Proprietary	10	0	6	1	1396	1088	56.20%	21	Preliminary	Central Augusta	16	7	103	West Augusta	9	4	58
Central Augusta	7	0	10	0	1375	1444	48.78%	14	Grand	Central Augusta	11	4	70	South Augusta	7	17	59
Solomontown	7	0	10	0	1088	1153	48.55%	14									
Port Pirie	1	0	16	0	863	1862	31.67%	2									

== 2011 Ladder ==
Spencer Gulf	Wins	Byes	Losses	Draws	For	Against	%	Pts	Final	Team	G	B	Pts	Team	G	B	Pts
Central Augusta	12	0	5	0	1562	1181	56.94%	24	1st Semi	South Augusta	12	8	80	West Augusta	9	9	63
Port Pirie	13	0	4	0	1399	1034	57.50%	26	2nd Semi	Port Pirie	10	9	69	Central Augusta	9	10	64
West Augusta	9	0	8	0	1505	1330	53.09%	18	Preliminary	Central Augusta	12	9	81	South Augusta	9	13	67
South Augusta	9	0	8	0	1355	1199	53.05%	18	Grand	Central Augusta	11	10	76	Port Pirie	8	3	51
Solomontown	7	0	10	0	1183	1183	50.00%	14									
Risdon/Proprietary	1	0	16	0	909	1986	31.40%	2									

== 2012 Ladder ==
Spencer Gulf	Wins	Byes	Losses	Draws	For	Against	%	Pts	Final	Team	G	B	Pts	Team	G	B	Pts
Solomontown	13	0	4	0	1546	1179	56.73%	26	1st Semi	Central Augusta	11	10	76	Port Pirie	8	16	64
South Augusta	12	0	5	0	1659	1233	57.37%	24	2nd Semi	South Augusta	16	8	104	Solomontown	6	10	46
Central Augusta	8	0	9	0	1404	1512	48.15%	16	Preliminary	Solomontown	13	5	83	Central Augusta	10	13	73
Port Pirie	7	0	10	0	1284	1192	51.86%	14	Grand	South Augusta	15	8	98	Solomontown	9	12	66
Risdon/Proprietary	7	0	10	0	1209	1409	46.18%	14									
West Augusta	4	0	13	0	1258	1835	40.67%	8									

== 2013 Ladder ==
Spencer Gulf	Wins	Byes	Losses	Draws	For	Against	%	Pts	Final	Team	G	B	Pts	Team	G	B	Pts
West Augusta	13	0	4	0	1760	1292	57.67%	26	1st Semi	Central Augusta	13	12	90	Solomontown	12	8	80
Risdon/Proprietary	11	0	6	0	1299	1162	52.78%	22	2nd Semi	West Augusta	12	5	77	Risdon/Proprietary	10	12	72
Central Augusta	10	0	7	0	1616	1296	55.49%	20	Preliminary	Central Augusta	13	9	87	Risdon/Proprietary	8	14	62
Solomontown	9	0	8	0	1459	1258	53.70%	18	Grand	West Augusta	16	8	104	Central Augusta	15	6	96
South Augusta	5	0	12	0	1079	1437	42.89%	10									
Port Pirie	3	0	14	0	1063	1831	36.73%	6									

== 2014 Ladder ==
Spencer Gulf	Wins	Byes	Losses	Draws	For	Against	%	Pts	Final	Team	G	B	Pts	Team	G	B	Pts
South Augusta	11	0	6	0	1330	1186	52.86%	22	1st Semi	Solomontown	12	8	80	Risdon/Proprietary	8	12	60
West Augusta	11	0	6	0	1322	1231	51.78%	22	2nd Semi	West Augusta	20	12	132	South Augusta	10	8	68
Risdon/Proprietary	10	0	7	0	1463	1136	56.29%	20	Preliminary	Solomontown	13	16	94	South Augusta	11	8	74
Solomontown	8	0	9	0	1244	1209	50.71%	16	Grand	Solomontown	8	19	67	West Augusta	7	11	53
Central Augusta	8	0	9	0	1265	1305	49.22%	16									
Port Pirie	3	0	14	0	1030	1587	39.36%	6									

== 2015 Ladder ==
Spencer Gulf	Wins	Byes	Losses	Draws	For	Against	%	Pts	Final	Team	G	B	Pts	Team	G	B	Pts
Risdon/Proprietary	11	0	5	1	1317	1126	53.91%	23	1st Semi	West Augusta	14	14	98	South Augusta	11	10	76
Central Augusta	9	0	6	2	1390	1344	50.84%	20	2nd Semi	Risdon/Proprietary	18	12	120	Central Augusta	8	9	57
West Augusta	8	0	9	0	1351	1227	52.40%	16	Preliminary	Central Augusta	14	13	97	South Augusta	12	11	83
South Augusta	8	0	9	0	1261	1331	48.65%	16	Grand	Risdon/Proprietary	16	15	111	Central Augusta	9	11	65
Port Pirie	7	0	10	0	1225	1352	47.54%	14									
Solomontown	6	0	10	1	1077	1241	46.46%	13									

== 2016 Ladder ==
Spencer Gulf	Wins	Byes	Losses	Draws	For	Against	%	Pts	Final	Team	G	B	Pts	Team	G	B	Pts
Risdon/Proprietary	14	0	2	0	1580	945	62.57%	28	1st Semi	West Augusta	13	8	86	Central Augusta	12	11	83
South Augusta	14	0	2	0	1606	1172	57.81%	28	2nd Semi	South Augusta	12	11	83	Risdon/Proprietary	9	6	60
West Augusta	7	0	9	0	1284	1342	48.90%	14	Preliminary	West Augusta	9	6	60	Risdon/Proprietary	7	5	47
Central Augusta	6	0	10	0	1195	1505	44.26%	12	Grand	South Augusta	14	14	98	West Augusta	4	17	41
Port Pirie	4	0	12	0	994	1318	42.99%	8									
Solomontown	3	0	13	0	1083	1460	42.59%	6									

== 2017 Ladder ==
Spencer Gulf	Wins	Byes	Losses	Draws	For	Against	%	Pts	Final	Team	G	B	Pts	Team	G	B	Pts
Solomontown	16	0	1	0	1808	763	70.32%	32	1st Semi	West Augusta	6	12	48	Risdon/Proprietary	18	9	117
South Augusta	12	0	5	0	1744	1306	57.18%	24	2nd Semi	South Augusta	21	3	129	Solomontown	11	15	81
Risdon/Proprietary	9	0	8	0	1157	1142	50.33%	18	Preliminary	Solomontown	11	7	73	Risdon/Proprietary	6	10	46
West Augusta	8	0	9	0	1304	1351	49.11%	16	Grand	South Augusta	13	11	89	Solomontown	10	7	67
Central Augusta	3	0	14	0	987	1562	38.72%	6									
Port Pirie	3	0	14	0	884	1760	33.43%	6									

== Bibliography ==
- Encyclopedia of South Australian country football clubs, compiled by Peter Lines. ISBN 9780980447293
- South Australian country football digest, by Peter Lines ISBN 9780987159199
