= South Australian Football Commission =

- Sport: Australian rules football
- Jurisdiction: South Australia
- Founded: 1991
- Headquarters: Adelaide, Australia
- (South Australia)

The South Australian Football Commission is the sports governing body of Australian rules football in South Australia.

The organisation was formed in 1991 when the South Australian National Football League altered its constitution to effectively allow the body to manage revenues from the licences of South Australian clubs in the Australian Football League (the Adelaide Crows and later Port Adelaide Power).

The commission also effectively owns Football Park on behalf of the SANFL.

The president and executive officer have the same role in both the SANFL and the SAFC.
