= List of former South Australian regional football leagues =

This is a list of former regional Australian rules football leagues in South Australia

Name	Founded	Ended	Reason	Previous Names
Albert District Football Association	1920	1926		
Alexandra Football Association	1913	1923	In recess 1916-21	
Barossa & Light Football Association	1908	1986	Merged with Gawler and District Football Association to form Barossa Light & Gawler Football Association	
Barossa & Murray Valley Football Association	1947	1956	in recess 1949-1954	
Belalie District Football Association	1929	1949		Jamestown Football Association (1929–33)
Blue Lake Football Association	1931	1937		
Booboorowie Football Association	1925	1933		
Border Downs Football Association	1930	1932		Midland Downs Football Association (1930–31)
Boundary District Football Association	1928	1934		
Broughton Football League	1910	1980		Broughton Football Association (1910–49)
Broughton Central Football Association	1912	1939	In recess 1932-35	North Western Football Association (1912–13)
Brown's Well Football Association	1920	1968	merged 1926-31 as part of the Loxton Brown's Well Football Association	
Brown's Well Line Football Association	1913	1914		
Bundaleer Football Association	1939	1940		
Burra Football Association	1905	1940	In recess 1925-31	
Cardwell Football Association	1945	1954		Merged with Lake Albert Football Association to form Lakes District Football Association
Carrow Football Association	1920	1932	In recess 1924-25	
Central Football Association	1926	1937		Caralue Football Association (1926–34)
Central Areas Football Association	1946	1956		
Central Peebinga Line Football Association	1928	1937	In recess 1936	
Central South Eastern & Border District Football Association	1924	1927	In recess 1926	Central South Eastern Football Association (1924)
Central Yorke Peninsula Football Association	1909	1921	In recess 1915-18 (World War I), absorbed into Southern Yorke Peninsula Football Association	
Cleve & Districts Football Association	1909	1961	In recess 1914-18 (World War I), 1941-45 (World War II), merged with Franklin Harbour Football Association to form Cleve Cowell Football League	
County Eyre Football Association	1931	1946	In recess 1934, 1941-44 (World War II)	
County Jervois Football League	1962	1988	merged with Kimba Football Association to form Eastern Eyre Football League	Cleve Cowell Football League (1962–63)
Cummins Football Association	1931	1931		
Drainage Areas Football Association	1920	1926		Millicent Football Association (1907-1914)
East Murray Football Association	1921	1970		
Eastern Eyre Peninsula Football Association	1920	1962	In recess 1924, 1941-44 (World War II)	
Eastern Yorke Peninsula Football Association	1913	1935	In recess 1916-20	
Far Northern Football Association	1925	1962	In recess 1930, 1935–49	
Far West Football Association	1924	1960	In recess 1941-46 (World War II)	
Fleurieu Peninsula Football Association	1934	1934		
Flinders Football Association	1912	1978	In recess 1914-18 (World War I), 1941-44 (World War II)	
Forster On Murray Football Association	1923	1929		
Franklin Harbour Football Association	1900	1961	merged with Cleve & Districts Football Association to form Cleve Cowell Football League	
Gawler and District Football Association	1889	1986	Merged with Barossa & Light Football Association to form Barossa Light & Gawler Football Association	Gawler Football Association
Gilbert Football Association	1921	1934		
Golden Vale Football Association	1924	1928		
Gordon Football Association	1923	1929		
Great Northern Football Association	1936	1960	merged with Whyalla Football League & Port Pirie Football Association to form Spencer Gulf Football League	
Hills Football Association	1902	1961	In recess 1915-18 (World War I), 1930–37, 1940-44 (World War II)	
Hills Central Football Association	1923	1966	In recess 1941-45 (World War II), merged with Torrens Valley Football Association to form Hills Football League	
Kadina & Wallaroo Junior Football Association	1911	1936	In recess 1916-18 (World War I), merged with Moonta & Districts Junior Football Association to form Yorke Peninsula Junior Football Association	
Karte & District Football Association	1926	1937		Peebinga Kingsford Football Association (1926–29) Kingsford & Border Football Association (1930–34)
Kimba Football Association	1920	1988	merged with County Jervois Football League to form Eastern Eyre Football League	
Kooringa Football Association	1925	1930		
Kowree Naracoorte Football League	1936	1992	Merged with Tatiara Football League to form Kowree-Naracoorte-Tatiara Football League	Kowree Football Association (1936)
Lake Albert Football Association	1946	1948		Merged with Cardwell Football Association to form Lakes District Football Association
Lakes District Football Association	1945	1954		
Lameroo & Districts Football Association	1925	1993	Merged with Murray Lands Football League to form Mallee Football League	
Lameroo & Western Football Association	1923	1924		
Le Hunte Football League	1919	1987	In recess 1941-45 (World War II), merged with Streaky Bay Football League to form Mid West Football League	Central Eyre Peninsula Football Association (1919–41)
Lower North Football Association	1925	1952	In recess 1932-35, 1941-45 (World War II)	
Loxton Brown's Well Football Association	1926	1931		
Loxton & District Football Association	1932	1940		
Loxton Line Football Association	1909	1925	In recess 1916-1918 (World War I); merged with Brown's Well Football Association to form Loxton Brown's Well Football Association	Loxton Football Association (1909-1915)
Mallee Football League	1994	2022	4 clubs - Border Downs/Tintinara, Murrayville, Karoonda Districts and Peake & District either merged or moved to other leagues	
Marble Range Football Association	1934	1936		
Martindale Football Association	1927	1927		
Mid Murray Football Association	1910	2009		
Mid North Football Association	1910	1975		
Mid Western Football Association	1913	1955	In recess 1915-25, 1929–47	
Mid Western Junior Football Association	1922	1922		
Mid West Football League	1988	2020		
Millicent Football Association	1907	1914	Abandoned due to World War I, reformed as Drainage Areas Football Association	
Moonta & District Junior Football Association	1914	1936	In recess 1916-18 (World War I), merged with Kadina & Wallaroo Junior Football Association to form Yorke Peninsula Junior Football Association	Moonta Junior Football Association (1914-1926)
Mount Gambier Football Association	1894	1914	Player numbers affected by World War I enlistments	
Mount Lock Football Association	1921	1933		
Mount Lofty Football Association	1921	1938		
Murray Bridge Football Association	1922	1925		
Murray Downs Football Association	1920	1940	In recess 1924-25	Lower Murray Football Association (1923)
Murray Lands Football League	1923	1993	merged with Lameroo & Districts Football League to form Mallee Football League	
Murray Mallee Football Association	1932	1940		Central Murray Football Association (1932)
Murray Ranges Football Association	1922	1935		
Murray River Football Association	1919	1931	In recess 1927-29	
Murray Valley Football Association	1921	1934		
Naracoote Football Association	1935	1935		
Narracoote Football Association	1912	1913		
North Gambier Football Association	1931	1934		
North West Goldfields Football Association	1935	1935		
North Western Football Association	1911	1963		North Western Yorke Peninsula Football Association (1930s)
Northern Districts Football Association	1979	1984		
Northern Football Association	1889	1889		
Olary Ridge Football Association	1935	1935		
Orroroo Football Association	1914	1923		
Peake & District Football Association	1925	1940		
Peterborough & Districts Football Association	1911	1961	In recess 1916-18 (World War I), 1936, 1942-44 (World War II)	Petersburg Football Association (1911–15) North Eastern Football Association (1919–26, 1929–38, 1945–58); Peterborough Football Association (1927–28, 1939–41)
Pinnaroo & Border Football Association	1910	1954		Pinnaroo Football Association (1910–15)
Port Augusta Football Association	1912	1934	In recess 1916 (World War I)	
Port Pirie Football Association	1893	1960	merged with Whyalla Football League & Great Northern Football Association to form Spencer Gulf Football League	
Port Pirie Shiftworkers Football Association	1923	1930		
Port Pirie United Churches Football Association				
Quorn Football Association	1918	1954	In recess 1928-32, 1939, 194-45 (World War II)	
Rocky River Football Association	1945	1945		
Rudall Centre Football Association	1929	1947	In recess 1941-45 (World War II)	Middle Areas Football Association (1929–40)
Rudall District Football Association	1935	1940		
South East & Border Football League	1946	1963	merged with Western Districts Football League to form Western Border Football League	Mount Gambier & District Football Association (1946–47)
South Eastern Country Football Association	1929	1930		
South Eastern Football Association	1926	1935	Folded, clubs joined the Mid South Eastern Football League	
Southern Ports Football League	1928	1965		
Southern Yorke Peninsula Football Association	1908	1993	In recess 1916-18 (World War I), 1941-44 (World War II), merged with Yorke Valley Football Association to form Yorke Peninsula Football League	Central & Southern Yorke Peninsula Football Association (1923)
Spalding Football Association	1924	1926		
Stanley Football Association	1915	1936	In recess 1916-17 (World War I), 1919. Joined the Mid North Association following the 1936 season	
Streaky Bay Football League	1923	1987	In recess 1941-45 (World War II), merged with Le Hunte Football League to form Mid West Football League	Central Flinders Football Association (1923–40)
Tatiara Football League	1911	1992	merged with Kowree Naracoorte Football League to form Kowree-Naracoorte-Tatiara Football League	
Torrens Valley Football Association	1921	1966	In recess 1940-45 (World War II), merged with Hills Central Football Association to form Hills Football League	
Wakefield Football Association	1925	1939		
Wakefield, Light & Gilbert Football Association	1904	1905		
Warratta Football Association	1910	1914		
Western Areas Football Association	1908	1961		
Western Flinders Football Association	1924	1938		
Willochra Football Association	1920	1936		Mount Remarkable Football Association (1920–23)
Wooroora Football Association	1909	1925	folded due to financial issues	
Yackamoorundie Football Association	1912	1924	In recess 1914-18 (World War I), clubs transferred to Moorundie Football Association	
Yackilowie Football Association	1914	1921		
Yorke Peninsula Football Association	1887	1960	In recess 1895, 1916-18 (World War I), 1941-44 (World War II)	
Yorke Peninsula Junior Football Association	1937	1946		
Yorke Valley Football League	1910	1993	In recess 1916-18 (World War I), 1937-45 (World War II), merged with Southern Yorke Peninsula Football Association to form Yorke Peninsula Football League	Northern Yorke Peninsula Football Association (1910–24) Northern and Mid Yorke Peninsula Football Association (1925–29)

== See also ==
- Lines, P. (2012) South Australian Country Football Digest, Cowell (SA). ISBN 9780987159199.
