= Apsley, Victoria =

Apsley
- Town
- Coordinates: 36°58′S 141°05′E
- Country: Australia
- State: Victoria
- LGA: Shire of West Wimmera
- Location: 417 km (259 mi) W of Melbourne; 369 km (229 mi) SE of Adelaide; 115 km (71 mi) W of Horsham; 21 km (13 mi) W of Edenhope; 30 km (19 mi) E of Naracoorte
- Established: 1841

Government
  - State electorate: Lowan
  - Federal division: Mallee

Population
  - Total: 329 (2021 census)
- Postcode: 3319

Apsley is a town in Victoria, Australia. It is on the Wimmera Highway, in the Shire of West Wimmera, 420 kilometres north-west of Melbourne, and 7 kilometres east of the South Australian border. The town is named after Apsley House in London. It was surveyed in 1851 and proclaimed in 1852, a Post Office opening on 1 January 1854 replacing that of Lake Wallace (open since 1 March 1849) nearer what is now Edenhope serving the grazing population.

The population at the 2021 census was 329. The town is close to Lake Bringalbert and Newlands Lake, and the Saint Gregory's Vineyard, which specialises in port wine.

Apsley had a football club that competed in the Kowree Naracoorte Football League from 1937. Later this would become the Kowree Naracoorte Tatiara Football League where Apsley competed until 1998, when they merged with Edenhope. Since 2007 Edenhope Apsley have played in the Horsham & District Football League. Apsley's best known sportspersons were footballers Reg Burgess, who played for the Essendon Football Club, Murrie Batt, who played for the Collingwood Football Club, 2020, 2023 Brownlow Medalist, 2024 Gary Ayres Award, 2x Premiership Captain and 3x Premiership Player Lachie Neale, who also currently plays for the Collingwood Football Club and hockey players Hattie Shand and Lachlan Busiko who play representing for Australia.

A large Red-flowering Gum on Wallace Street is listed on the National Trust of Australia's Significant Tree Register for Victoria.

Golfers play at the Apsley Golf Club on the Wimmera Highway.

In 2014, 12 farm families banded together to buy the pub. The Border Inn Hotel has completed an extensive renovation, and has a small attached general store for the town, which has recently opened.

The township also has a state primary school.
