= Edenhope =

- Town
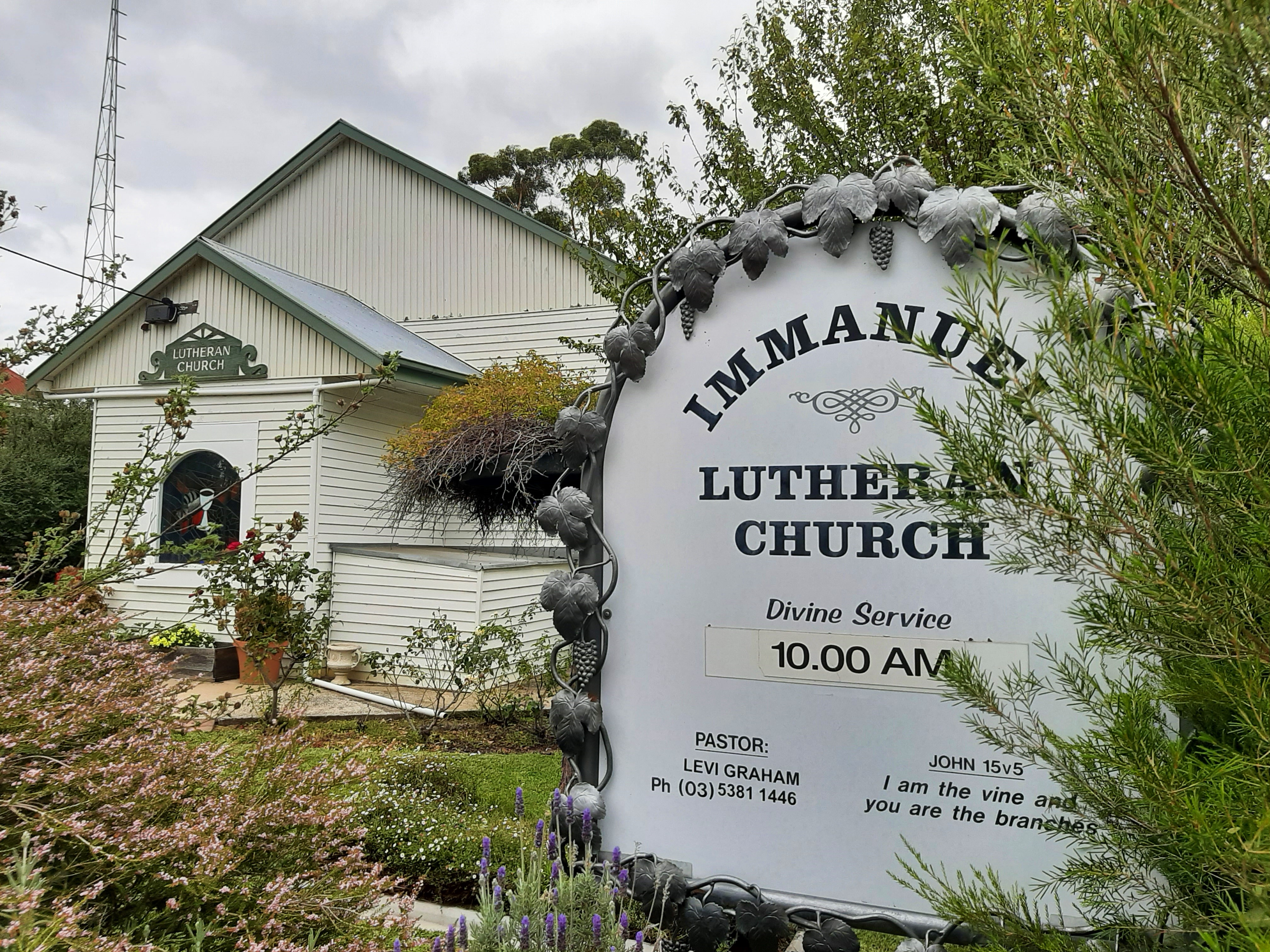
- Metal grapes and vine leaves around the Edenhope Lutheran Church sign

- Coordinates: 37°02′11″S 141°17′25″E
- Country: Australia
- State: Victoria
- LGA: Shire of West Wimmera
- Location: 396 km (246 mi) W of Melbourne; 387 km (240 mi) SE of Adelaide; 95 km (59 mi) SW of Horsham; 53 km (33 mi) E of Naracoorte

Government
  - State electorate: Lowan
  - Federal division: Mallee

Population
  - Total: 946 (2016 census)
- Postcode: 3318

Edenhope is a town in Victoria, Australia. It is located on the Wimmera Highway, 30 kilometres from the South Australian border, in the Shire of West Wimmera local government area. At the 2016 census, Edenhope had a population of 946.

The township of Edenhope was established some years later than nearby Apsley, the Post Office opening on 16 July 1864.

== Naming of town4 ==
The first European settlers in the district were the Hope family, in 1845. They came from Scotland and had lived next to the Eden River. The Hope family established the Lake Wallace pastoral station.

== Lake Wallace ==
Edenhope sits on the southern shore of Lake Wallace, which is named after William Wallace. The lake, which covers about 200 hectares, is a five-minute walk from Edenhope's main street. There is a jetty and several boat ramps. Lake Wallace is also a waterbird haven where black swans nest in spring. There are bird hides and a 5 km scenic walking track around the lake. Lake Wallace dries up at times of extreme drought, but when the water level is high it is used for swimming, fishing and boating.

On Lake Street, in the grounds of the Secondary College, there is a cairn commemorating the Aboriginal cricket team that toured England in 1868. Many of the team learned their cricket skills on the shore of the lake.

== Historical buildings ==
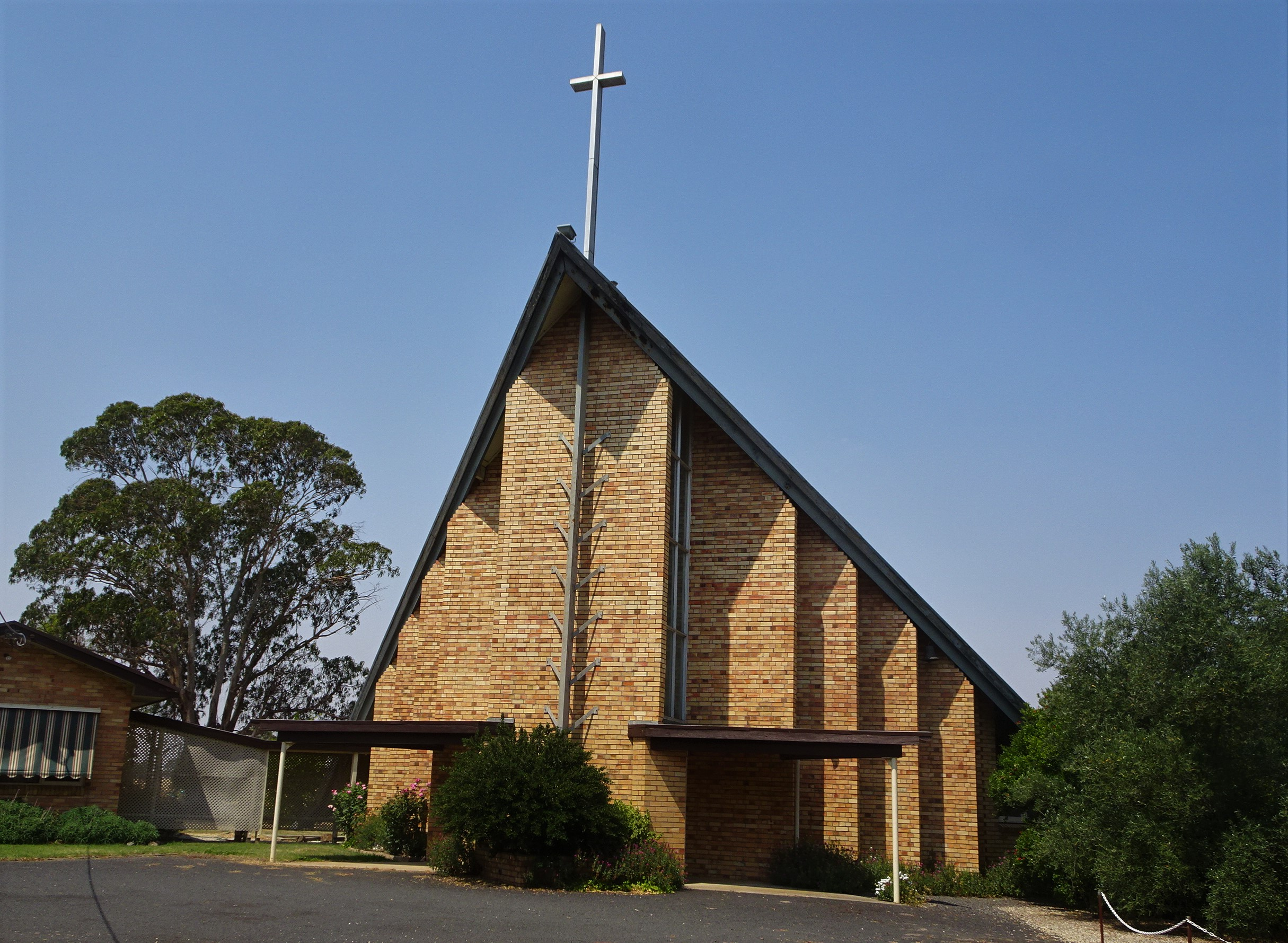
The Anglican Church in Edenhope.

The Edenhope Magistrates' Court closed on 1 January 1983. Opposite the Court House is the Back Swamp, home to local bird life which can be viewed from the bird hide and bird walk.

== Recreation ==
Edenhope has a horse racing club, the Edenhope Racing Club, which holds the Edenhope Cup meeting on the Labour Day weekend in March. The Apsley Racing Club also hold their Cup meeting there in April.

Golfers play at the Edenhope Golf Club on Laidlaw Avenue.

The Edenhope-Apsley Football Netball Club was created from a merger with the team from nearby Apsley in 1999. The team competes in the Horsham & District Football League, after competing in the Kowree-Naracoorte-Tatiara Football League until 2006. Previously Edenhope and Aspley had a healthy rivalry that developed in the Kowree Naracoorte Football League.

Edenhope hosts Henley on Lake Wallace on the second Saturday in February. The regatta and related events date back to 1921, when funds were raised to erect a memorial to soldiers of the First World War.

== Notable people ==
- Phil Carman former Collingwood, Melbourne, North Melbourne & Essendon footballer
- Don Dixon former Collingwood footballer
- Alex Forster former player at the Fremantle Football Club
- Max Galpin former Fitzroy footballer
- Bruce Greenhill former Footscray footballer
- Richard Charles Guthridge, early settler
- Emma Kealy politician
- Graeme MacKenzie former Fitzroy footballer * Paul Cranage former Collingwood footballer
- Tom McDonald current Melbourne footballer
- Oscar McDonald current Melbourne footballer

== Climate ==
Climate data for Edenhope Airport, elevation 155 m (509 ft), (2005–2024)
Month	Jan	Feb	Mar	Apr	May	Jun	Jul	Aug	Sep	Oct	Nov	Dec	Year
Record high °C (°F)	45.0 (113.0)	44.9 (112.8)	41.2 (106.2)	36.2 (97.2)	27.8 (82.0)	23.5 (74.3)	20.2 (68.4)	25.2 (77.4)	30.0 (86.0)	35.9 (96.6)	39.4 (102.9)	46.5 (115.7)	46.5 (115.7)
Mean daily maximum °C (°F)	29.6 (85.3)	28.5 (83.3)	25.8 (78.4)	21.1 (70.0)	16.8 (62.2)	14.0 (57.2)	13.3 (55.9)	14.6 (58.3)	17.0 (62.6)	20.4 (68.7)	24.1 (75.4)	26.7 (80.1)	21.0 (69.8)
Mean daily minimum °C (°F)	13.3 (55.9)	13.0 (55.4)	11.5 (52.7)	9.1 (48.4)	7.1 (44.8)	5.1 (41.2)	5.0 (41.0)	5.4 (41.7)	6.5 (43.7)	7.7 (45.9)	9.9 (49.8)	11.1 (52.0)	8.7 (47.7)
Record low °C (°F)	4.2 (39.6)	4.7 (40.5)	2.5 (36.5)	−1.2 (29.8)	−2.6 (27.3)	−2.6 (27.3)	−2.2 (28.0)	−1.4 (29.5)	−1.3 (29.7)	−0.4 (31.3)	0.8 (33.4)	2.2 (36.0)	−2.6 (27.3)
Average rainfall mm (inches)	31.1 (1.22)	16.7 (0.66)	24.2 (0.95)	32.9 (1.30)	45.3 (1.78)	52.0 (2.05)	63.9 (2.52)	65.0 (2.56)	48.5 (1.91)	41.8 (1.65)	30.3 (1.19)	35.8 (1.41)	485.9 (19.13)
Average rainy days (≥ 1.0 mm)	3.0	2.4	4.1	5.3	9.2	9.2	12.5	12.4	9.1	6.9	4.8	4.4	83.3
Source: Australian Bureau of Meteorology
