= Hatherleigh Football Club =

Hatherleigh

Names
- Full name: Hatherleigh Football Club
- Nickname: Eagles

2025 season
- After finals: Premiers
- Home-and-away season: 1st
- Leading goalkicker: Frazer Bradley (100 Goals)

Club details
- Founded: 1946; 80 years ago
- Colours: Blue Gold
- Competition: Mid South Eastern Football League
- Coach: Tom Hutchesson
- Captain: Will Chay
- Premierships: 8 (1971, 2002, 2005, 2008, 2013, 2024, 2025, 2026)
- Ground: Hatherleigh Sport and Recreation Centre, Hatherleigh

Uniforms
Home

The Hatherleigh Football Club is an Australian rules football club based in Hatherleigh, South Australia. The club currently competes in the Mid South Eastern Football League and is known by the nickname Eagles. Hatherleigh has won seven A Grade premierships, with its most recent premierships coming in 2024 and 2025.

== History ==
The Hatherleigh Football Club was established in 1946, with the club entering the Mid South Eastern Football League in 1947. The Eagles played their first match in the competition against Glencoe on 3 May 1947, losing by 75 points.

Hatherleigh quickly established itself as a competitive club in the Mid South Eastern competition. The Eagles reached their first A Grade grand final in 1949, where they were defeated by Glencoe by 15 points.

After more than two decades in the competition, Hatherleigh won its first A Grade premiership in 1971. The Eagles defeated Glencoe at Mount Burr to claim their first senior premiership.

The club continued to be a strong presence in the Mid South Eastern Football League during the following decades. Hatherleigh developed a reputation for strong junior and senior programs and became one of the league's established clubs.

Hatherleigh returned to A Grade premiership success in 2002. The Eagles then won further premierships in 2005 and 2008, establishing one of the strongest periods in the club's history.

In 2013, Hatherleigh won its fifth A Grade premiership. The club also continued to experience success across its lower grades, including a strong record in the Senior Colts competition.

Hatherleigh reached further A Grade grand finals in the late 2010s and early 2020s but was unable to add to its premiership tally. The Eagles were runners-up in 2017, 2022 and 2023.

The 2020 Mid South Eastern Football League season was abandoned because of the COVID-19 pandemic. The competition resumed in 2021, with Hatherleigh remaining one of the league's leading clubs.

In 2024, Hatherleigh won its sixth A Grade premiership. The Eagles defeated Robe in the grand final to claim their first senior premiership since 2013.

The 2025 season proved even more successful. Hatherleigh finished the minor round as premiers and defeated Robe in the A Grade grand final by 17 points, winning 7.14 (56) to 6.3 (39). The victory gave the Eagles consecutive A Grade premierships for the first time in club history and their seventh senior premiership overall.

In 2026, Hatherleigh entered the season as the reigning back-to-back premiers. The Eagles remained one of the leading teams in the Mid South Eastern Football League, with forward Frazer Bradley emerging as one of the competition's most prolific goalkickers.

== Premierships ==
- Mid South Eastern FL (8)
  - 1971, 2002, 2005, 2008, 2013, 2024, 2025, 2026

== Club colours and nickname ==
Hatherleigh is known by the nickname Eagles and wears the traditional club colours of blue and gold. The blue and gold colours have become strongly associated with the club and are commonly used to identify Hatherleigh teams throughout the Mid South Eastern Football League.

The Eagles nickname forms a central part of the club's identity, with the team's blue-and-gold playing strip and eagle emblem being closely associated with Hatherleigh football.

== Notable players ==
=== A Grade best and fairest winners ===
Hatherleigh has produced a number of successful players who have won league and club best and fairest awards. The club has also regularly provided players to Mid South Eastern Football League representative teams.

=== Notable players ===
- Tom Hutchesson – former GWS Giants listed player and Adelaide SANFL player who became Hatherleigh senior coach in 2024.
- Frazer Bradley – Hatherleigh forward and 2025 premiership player who returned to the club from Millicent in 2025.
- Michael Telford – Hatherleigh midfielder and 2025 Stan Jones Memorial Medal winner as best on ground in the MSEFL A Grade grand final.
- Will Chay – long-serving Hatherleigh captain and 2024 and 2025 premiership captain.

== Milestones ==
Luke Haines is one of Hatherleigh's longest-serving players. He joined the club in 1996 after beginning his junior football with Millicent and went on to reach 300 senior games for the Eagles in 2021.

Hatherleigh has also maintained strong family connections across generations. The Faulkner family has had several generations of players represent the Eagles, while numerous players have progressed from the club's junior program into the A Grade side.

The club's 2024 premiership was its sixth A Grade flag and ended an 11-year premiership drought. The 2025 victory then delivered the first consecutive A Grade premierships in the club's history.

== See also ==
- Mid South Eastern Football League
- Hatherleigh, South Australia
- Millicent Football Club
- Tantanoola Football Club
- Robe Football Club
- Mount Burr Football Club
- Glencoe Football Club
