= Millicent Football Club =

Millicent

Names
- Full name: Millicent Football Club
- Nickname: Saints

Club details
- Founded: 1906; 120 years ago
- Colours: red white black
- Competition: Limestone Coast Football Netball League
- President: Steven Duldig
- Coach: Jacob Carger
- Premierships: 18
- Ground: McLaughlin Park, Millicent

Uniforms
Home

The Millicent Football Club, also known as the Millicent Saints, is an Australian rules football club based in Millicent, South Australia. The club currently competes in the Limestone Coast Football Netball League. Millicent has a long history of competition in football leagues across South Australia's Limestone Coast region and has won premierships across several competitions. The club's most recent senior premiership was won in 2025, when Millicent defeated West Gambier in the inaugural Limestone Coast Football Netball League A Grade football grand final.

== History ==
Football was first reported as being played in the Millicent area in 1874. The first recorded formation of the Millicent Football Club occurred in 1894, although the club was formed and reformed several times during its early years. Millicent North Football Club was established in 1902, while a junior club was formed in 1906.

In 1907, the Millicent Football Association was established, with Millicent Seniors, Millicent Warriors and a combined Beachport and Furner team competing in the competition. Millicent Seniors defeated the Rovers in the 1907 grand final. A new Millicent District Football Association was formed in 1912, consisting of Millicent, Tantanoola and Mount McIntyre.

The First World War restricted football in the district. In 1920, the Drainage Areas Football Association was formed, featuring three Millicent teams alongside Tantanoola. The Millicent Warriors won premierships in 1920, 1922 and 1924, while the Millicent Royal Blues won premierships in 1923, 1925 and 1926. In 1927, Millicent joined the South East Football Association alongside North Gambier, South Gambier, Penola and Naracoorte. Millicent won South East Football Association premierships in 1931, 1934 and 1935.

In 1936, the Mid South East Football Association was established. Millicent was represented by Millicent Rovers and Millicent Centrals during this period. Millicent Rovers won the 1936 premiership, while Millicent Centrals won three consecutive premierships from 1937 to 1939 (Millicent Centrals would become the Mount Burr United Football Club). Millicent won another premiership in 1946 before moving into the Mount Gambier & District Football League in 1947.

Millicent won consecutive South East & Border Football League A Grade premierships in 1955 and 1956. In 1964, the Western District Football League in Victoria and the South-East & Border Football League in South Australia merged to form the Western Border Football League. Millicent became one of the clubs competing in the newly established competition.

Millicent won its first Western Border Football League A Grade premiership in 1984, defeating Hamilton Imperials by 28 points in the grand final. The club went on to experience another successful period more than three decades later, winning the 2018 premiership and ending a 34-year senior premiership drought. Millicent's 2018 side was led by playing coach Clint Gallio, while Tom Hutchesson was named best on ground in the grand final and won the Western Border Football League Mail Medal.

Millicent won further Western Border Football League A Grade premierships in 2021 and 2022. The 2022 premiership was the club's third in four seasons, following its 2018 success and the cancellation of the 2020 season because of the COVID-19 pandemic. The 2023 season was one of the most successful in the club's history. Millicent won all five senior football and netball premierships available on Western Border grand final day. The achievement came in the final season of the Western Border Football League and Netball League before the South East football and netball competitions were restructured.

Following the South East football restructure, the Western Border Football League was replaced by the Limestone Coast Football Netball League. Millicent joined the new competition alongside East Gambier, North Gambier, South Gambier and West Gambier. In 2025, Millicent won the Limestone Coast Football Netball League A Grade football premiership. The Saints defeated West Gambier 9.9 (63) to 5.2 (32) in the grand final, securing their inaugural senior football premiership of the restructured competition after a Grand Final loss to West Gambier in 2024.

== Premierships ==
| League | Total flags | Premiership years |
|---|---|---|
| Drainage Areas Football Association | 6 | 1920, 1922, 1923, 1924, 1925, 1926 |
| South East Football Association | 3 | 1931, 1934, 1935 |
| Mid South East Football Association | 1 | 1946 |
| South-East & Border Football League | 2 | 1955, 1956 |
| Western Border Football League | 5 | 1984, 2018, 2021, 2022, 2023 |
| Limestone Coast Football Netball League | 1 | 2025 |

== Club colours and nickname ==
Millicent is known by the nickname Saints. The club's colours are red, white and black.

In 1965, Millicent was required to change its colours after finishing at the bottom of the competition due to an arrangement with the Hamilton Football Club (also wearing Black and White stripes). The club added red to its existing colours and subsequently became known as the Saints. New clubrooms at McLaughlin Park were opened in 1977.

== Notable players ==
=== AFL players ===
- Mason Redman
- Tom Hutchesson
- Byron Pickett (After Retirement)

== See also ==
- Limestone Coast Football Netball League
- Western Border Football League
- South East Football Association
- Millicent, South Australia
- North Gambier Football Club
- South Gambier Football Club
- West Gambier Football Club
