= Tantanoola Football Club =

Tantanoola

Names
- Full name: Tantanoola Football Club
- Nickname: Tigers
- Club song: "A Tiger For Me"

2025 season
- After finals: 3rd
- Home-and-away season: 4th

Club details
- Founded: 1894; 132 years ago
- Colours: Red White
- Competition: Mid South Eastern Football League
- President: Matthew Cytrowski
- Coach: Jack Dawe
- Captain: Brandon Pitts
- Premierships: 7 (1921, 1947, 1948, 1973, 1975, 1986, 2006)
- Ground: Tantanoola Oval, Tantanoola

Uniforms
Home

The Tantanoola Football Club is an Australian rules football club based in Tantanoola, South Australia. The club currently competes in the Mid South Eastern Football League and is known by the nickname Tigers. Tantanoola has won six A Grade premierships in the history of the club, with its most recent senior premiership coming in 2006.

== History ==
The Tantanoola Football Club was formed in 1894 and played organised challenge matches against clubs including Millicent, Compton and Suttontown. The club later became a member of the Millicent Football Association during the early 1900s.

In 1910, Tantanoola combined with the Murribum Football Club to form Murribum Rovers. The combined club lasted for one season before Tantanoola resumed as a separate club.

In 1920, Tantanoola became a member of the Drainage Areas Football Association. The competition included several clubs from the Millicent district and provided Tantanoola with regular organised competition in the South East region. Tantanoola won the association's premiership in 1921.

In 1926, Tantanoola entered the South East Association B Grade competition. The club continued to compete in regional football before becoming one of the foundation members of the Mid South East Football League in 1936.

The Mid South East Football League was formed in 1936, with Tantanoola joining Glencoe, Kalangadoo, Millicent Centrals and Millicent Rovers as foundation clubs. The competition later became known as the Mid South Eastern Football League.

Tantanoola won its first recorded A Grade premierships in 1947 and 1948, establishing the club as one of the successful early clubs in the competition. The Tigers later won further A Grade premierships in 1973 and 1975.

Tantanoola won its fifth A Grade premiership in 1986. The club's next senior premiership came in 2006, when the Tigers defeated Hatherleigh in the Mid South Eastern Football League grand final. The 2006 premiership ended a 20-year drought between senior premierships for the club.

The club has also enjoyed considerable success in its lower grades. Tantanoola has won 12 B Grade premierships, six Senior Colts premierships and five Junior Colts premierships according to the club's official history.

In 2020, the Mid South Eastern Football League season was abandoned because of the COVID-19 pandemic. The competition resumed in 2021, with Tantanoola continuing to compete in the league.

== Premierships ==
- Drainage Areas FA (1)
  - 1921
- Mid South Eastern FL (6)
  - 1947, 1948, 1973, 1975, 1986, 2006

== Club colours and nickname ==
Tantanoola is known by the nickname Tigers and wears the traditional club colours of red and white. The nickname comes from the famous Tantanoola Tiger, a mysterious animal reportedly seen in the Tantanoola district during the 1890s. The story became an important part of the town's identity and the football club adopted the Tigers nickname in recognition of the local legend.

== Notable players ==
=== A Grade best and fairest winners ===
Tantanoola has maintained an extensive record of A Grade best and fairest winners, with the club's honour board dating from 1971 onwards. Players to win the club's A Grade best and fairest include Bert Barber, Peter Ey, W. James, R. J. Walker, P. Schultz, C. Ey, M. Pascoe, J. A. Barber, R. G. Nicholls, T. M. Hateley and many others.

More recent winners include Tim Stringer, Jason Rowe, Michael Bennett, Lyndon Smith, Tom Holmes, Jordan Williams, Hayden Brown, Chris Oliver and Jack Dawe.

=== Notable players ===
- Nathan Bell – long-serving Tantanoola player and 2006 A Grade premiership captain.
- Luke Panozzo – Tantanoola player who was listed among notable players from the Mid South Eastern Football League.
- Toby Pink – Former Tantanoola junior who currently plays for North Melbourne in the AFL.

== Milestones ==
Nathan Bell is one of the longest-serving players in the club's history. He made his Tantanoola senior debut in 1997 after beginning with the club as a junior and was captain of the 2006 A Grade premiership side. In April 2026, Bell celebrated his 400th senior game for Tantanoola.

Hayden Brown also reached a significant milestone in August 2026, playing his 250th senior game for Tantanoola. Brown played his junior football with the Tigers and was part of the club's 2006 A Grade premiership side.

== See also ==
- Mid South Eastern Football League
- Tantanoola, South Australia
- Millicent Football Club
