= Robe Football Club =

Robe

Names
- Full name: Robe Football Club
- Nickname: Roosters

2025 season
- After finals: Runners-up
- Home-and-away season: 2nd

Club details
- Founded: 1928; 98 years ago
- Colours: Red White
- Competition: Mid South Eastern Football League
- President: Jason Pettit
- Premierships: 16 (1931, 1932, 1933, 1948, 1953, 1955, 1956, 1957, 1962, 1963, 1964, 1965, 1968, 1987, 2003, 2018)
- Ground: Robe Oval, Robe

Uniforms
Home

The Robe Football Club is an Australian rules football club based in Robe, South Australia. The club currently competes in the Mid South Eastern Football League and is known by the nickname Roosters. Robe was established in 1928 and has a long history of football in the South East of South Australia, having competed in the Southern Ports Football League before joining the Mid South Eastern Football League in 1966.

== History ==
The Robe Football Club was established in 1928 and became one of the foundation clubs of the Southern Ports Football League. The competition was formed with Robe, Kingston and Mount Benson, with Beachport and Lucindale joining later.

Robe quickly became one of the dominant clubs in the Southern Ports competition. The Roosters won their first premiership in 1931 before going back-to-back-to-back in 1931, 1932 and 1933. The club went on to win further premierships in 1948, 1953, 1955, 1956 and 1957.

The club continued to experience considerable success during the 1960s, winning Southern Ports Football Association premierships in 1962, 1963, 1964 and 1965. These four consecutive premierships were the final four flags won by Robe in the competition. The Southern Ports Football Association was disbanded at the end of the 1965 season. Robe subsequently joined the Mid South Eastern Football League in 1966, where it has remained ever since.

Robe won its first Mid South Eastern Football League A Grade premiership in 1968. The Roosters had an immediate impact after joining the competition, claiming the premiership only two years after their arrival.

The Roosters returned to premiership success in 1987. The club's official past players register records numerous members of the 1987 premiership team, including Frank Maggi, Chris McClay, David Murch and Tim Pietsch.

Robe reached another period of success in the early 2000s. The Roosters won the 2003 A Grade premiership after finishing the previous season near the bottom of the competition. The club's official past players register describes the 2003 premiership as a major turnaround for the club.

Robe also won the A Grade premiership in 2003 and the Reserves premiership in 2005. The club's official records include Jason Pettit as the non-playing captain of the 2003 A Grade premiership side and a member of the 2005 B Grade premiership team.

In 2018, Robe enjoyed one of the greatest seasons in its modern history. Coached by Jack Kelly, the Roosters won the Mid South Eastern Football League A Grade premiership, defeating Mount Burr in the grand final at Glencoe.

The 2018 premiership was Robe's fourth A Grade premiership since joining the Mid South Eastern Football League. It was also the club's first A Grade flag since 2003.

The 2020 Mid South Eastern Football League season was abandoned because of the COVID-19 pandemic. Robe returned to competition in 2021 and continued to be a regular finals contender during the following seasons.

Robe reached the 2023 MSEFL finals, with the Senior Colts winning their grand final. The club also won the A Reserve netball premiership that year.

In 2024, the Robe Football Club confirmed that it intended to remain in the Mid South Eastern Football League despite interest from the SANFL about a possible move to the Limestone Coast Football Netball League. The club stated that it had no intention of leaving the competition it had called home since 1966.

Robe reached the 2025 MSEFL A Grade grand final against Hatherleigh. The Roosters led at quarter time and half time but were ultimately defeated 7.14 (56) to 6.3 (39).

== Premierships ==
- Southern Ports Football Association (12)
  - 1931, 1932, 1933, 1948, 1953, 1955, 1956, 1957, 1962, 1963, 1964, 1965
- Mid South Eastern FL (4)
  - 1968, 1987, 2003, 2018

== Club colours and nickname ==
Robe is known by the nickname Roosters and wears the traditional club colours of red and white. The colours are strongly associated with the club and the Robe community, with local supporters decorating the town in red and white during major football events.

The Roosters nickname has been used throughout the club's history and remains a central part of the identity of the Robe Football Club.

== Home ground ==
Robe plays its home games at Robe Oval in Robe. The oval is located close to the centre of the seaside town and has been the home of the Roosters throughout their history in the Mid South Eastern Football League.

Robe Oval has also hosted major Mid South Eastern Football League matches, including finals and grand finals. The 2025 MSEFL A Grade grand final between Hatherleigh and Robe was played at Robe Oval.

== Notable players ==
=== League medallists ===
Robe has produced a number of players who have been recognised with major Mid South Eastern Football League awards. Notable Robe winners include Wilf Sprengel, who won the league medal in 1987, and Mike Petersen, who won the award in 2006.

=== Notable players ===
- Jordan Dawson – Robe junior who went on to play in the AFL with Sydney and Adelaide and became captain of Adelaide.
- Jack Kelly – former Robe player and coach who coached the Roosters to the 2018 MSEFL premiership.
- Jonny Agnew – 2018 Robe premiership captain and club champion.
- Jake Wehl – 2018 premiership player and club champion who was recognised among the leading players in the MSEFL during the season.

== Milestones ==
Robe has a strong history of long-serving players and families contributing to the club. The Robe Football Club maintains an extensive past players and officials register documenting players, coaches, officials and their memories of playing for the Roosters.

The club's 1987 premiership remains one of the significant milestones of its modern history, while the 2003 and 2018 A Grade premierships represent two further major periods of success.

In 2025, Robe reached another MSEFL A Grade grand final, making the Roosters one of the competition's most consistent finals teams in the period since their 2018 premiership.
