= Toby Pink =

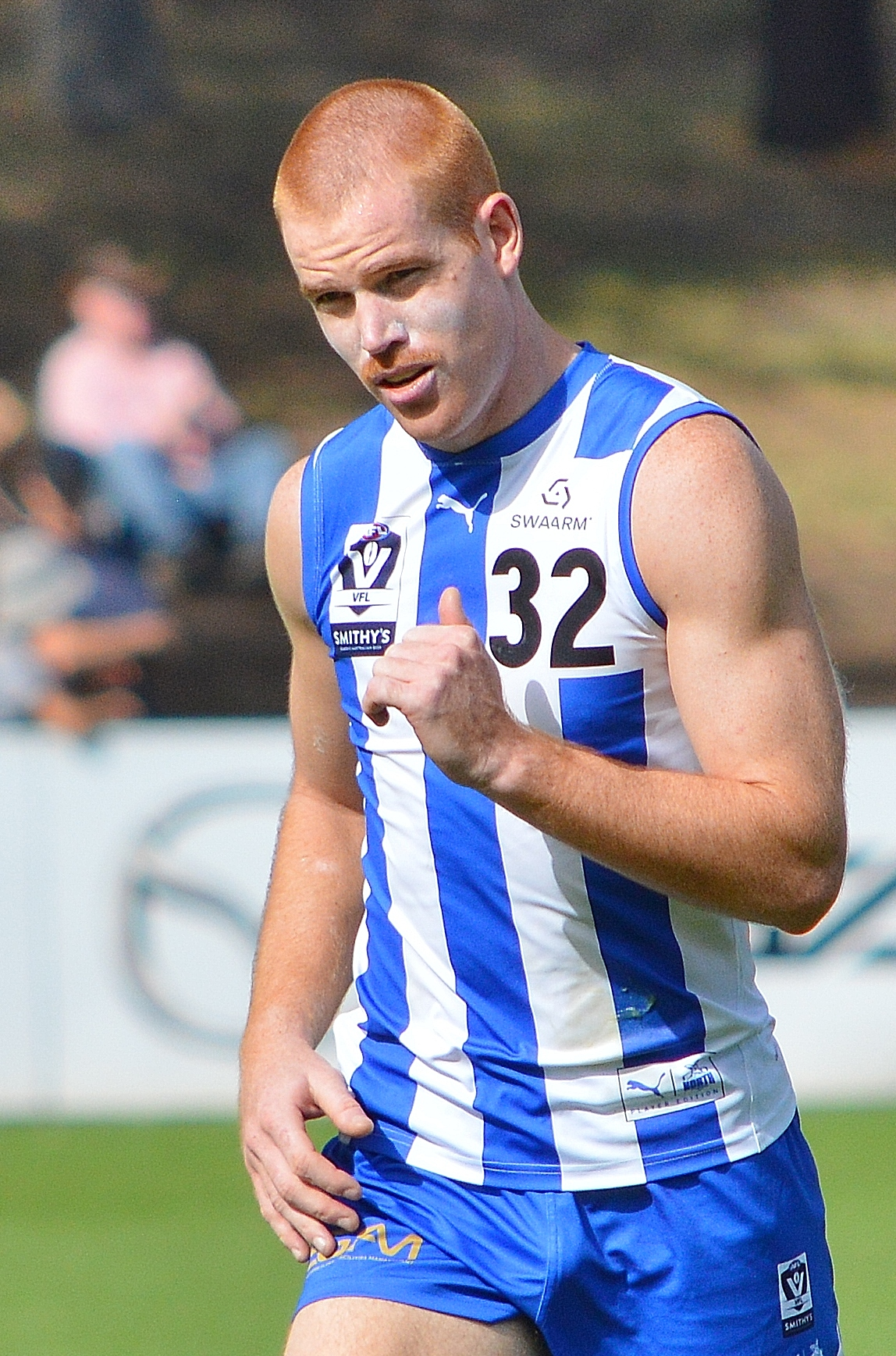
- Pink with North Melbourne's VFL side in April 2025

Personal information
- Born: 11 August 1998 (age 28)
- Original teams: Glenelg; Tantanoola
- Draft: No. 54, 2017 rookie draft
- Debut: 16 March 2024, North Melbourne vs. Greater Western Sydney, at Sydney Showground Stadium
- Height: 194 cm (6 ft 4 in)
- Weight: 94 kg (207 lb)
- Position: Key defender

Club information
- Current club: North Melbourne
- Number: 32

Playing career^{1}
Years	Club	Games (Goals)
2017–2019	Sydney	0 (0)
2024–	North Melbourne	37 (7)
- ^{1} Playing statistics correct to the end of round 22, 2026.

Career highlights
- SANFL: SANFL Premiership player: 2023

Toby Pink (born 11 August 1998) is an Australian rules footballer who plays for the North Melbourne Football Club in the Australian Football League (AFL).

From Tantanoola, South Australia, Pink played his under-18s football for the Glenelg Football Club while boarding at Rostrevor College in Adelaide. While there, he kicked the winning behind in Glenelg's one-point win against North Adelaide in the 2016 under-18s grand final; having marked just before the final siren, Pink took an after the siren 60m set shot into the wind, which fell short but bounced through for a behind, somehow eluding the eleven North Adelaide defenders who were standing in the goal square. In previous years he played for his local community club Tantanoola Tigers and attended Millicent High School.

Pink was drafted by Sydney with the last pick of the 2017 rookie draft. He spent three seasons on the Sydney list, missing most of the 2018 season with a broken ankle, but was ultimately delisted at the end of 2019 without playing a senior game. Pink signed with the North Melbourne reserves in the 2020 season, never playing a game there because the season was cancelled due to the COVID-19 pandemic. He then returned to play senior football with Glenelg.

Having played mostly as a forward and ruckman through the early part of his career, Pink switched to the backline at Glenelg, and in 2023 he was named full back in the SANFL Team of the Year – as well as being part of the club's premiership team. This performance saw him return to the AFL, signed by North Melbourne as a delisted free agent in October 2023. He made his senior AFL debut at age 25 in round 2, 2024. He played 15 senior games in 2024, triggering a one-year contract extension.

== Statistics ==
Updated to the end of round 22, 2026.

Legend
G	Goals	K	Kicks	D	Disposals	T	Tackles
B	Behinds	H	Handballs	M	Marks	H/O	Hit-outs

Season	Team	No.	Games	Totals								Averages (per game)								Votes
Season	Team	No.	Games	G	B	K	H	D	M	T	H/O	G	B	K	H	D	M	T	H/O	Votes
2017	Sydney	47	0	—	—	—	—	—	—	—	—	—	—	—	—	—	—	—	—	0
2018	Sydney	47	0	—	—	—	—	—	—	—	—	—	—	—	—	—	—	—	—	0
2019	Sydney	47	0	—	—	—	—	—	—	—	—	—	—	—	—	—	—	—	—	0
2024	North Melbourne	32	15	7	6	57	47	104	38	17	9	0.5	0.4	3.8	3.1	6.9	2.5	1.1	0.6	0
2025	North Melbourne	32	17	0	0	124	56	180	88	22	0	0.0	0.0	7.3	3.3	10.6	5.2	1.3	0.0	0
2026	North Melbourne	32	5	0	0	38	23	61	25	4	0	0.0	0.0	7.6	4.6	12.2	5.0	0.8	0.0	0
Career			37	7	6	219	126	345	151	43	9	0.2	0.2	5.9	3.4	9.3	4.1	1.2	0.2	0
