= Far West Football Association =

Defunct South Australian football league

The Far West Football Association is a former South Australian country football league that started in 1924 under the name of the Great Flinders Football Association and folded at the end of the 1960 season.

The League was made up of teams from Coorabie, Bookabie, Penong, Charra, Koonibba, Denial Bay, Watraba.

Teams from this league still compete in the Western Eyre Football League in 2025.

== Clubs ==
=== Final ===
Club	Colours	Nickname	Home Ground	Former league	Est.	Years in FWFA	FWFA Senior Premierships		Fate
Club	Colours	Nickname	Home Ground	Former league	Est.	Years in FWFA	Total	Years	Fate
Bookabie	(?-1950s)(1950s-60)			–	1922	1924-1940, 1949-1960	12	1925, 1926, 1927, 1935, 1937, 1949, 1950, 1951, 1952, 1955, 1958, 1960	Recess between 1946-49. Folded after the 1960 season.
Coorabie		Eagles	Coorabie Oval, Coorabie	–	1922	1924-1933, 1935-1960	2	1924, 1959	Was in recess in 1934. Folded after 1960 season.
Penong		Tigers	Penong Sports Ground, Penong	COWFL	1908	1924-1960	7	1928, 1930, 1932, 1934, 1947, 1953, 1957	Moved to Murat Bay FL after 1960 season.

=== Former ===
Club	Colours	Nickname	Home Ground	Former league	Est.	Years in FWFA	FWFA Senior Premierships		Fate
Club	Colours	Nickname	Home Ground	Former league	Est.	Years in FWFA	Total	Years	Fate
Charra				COWFL	1908	1930, 1934-1959	3	1936, 1954, 1956	Played merged with Denial Bay in County of Way FL between 1931-34. Moved to Murat Bay FL at the end of 1959 season
Denial Bay				COWFL	1907	1935-1946	0	-	Returned to County of Way FL after 1946 season
Gypsum Works				–	1924	1924	0	-	Folded after first season of FWFA.
Koonibba		Roosters	Far West Aboriginal Sporting Complex, Thevenard	COWFL	1906	1937-1946	4	1938, 1939, 1940, 1946	Returned to County of Way FL after 1946 season
Watraba				–	1927	1927-1929, 1932-1940	2	1928, 1934	Did not reform after WWII

== Grand Finals ==
Year	Grand Final Score
1924	Coorabie 8.11 def Gypsum Works 3.5
1925	Bookabie 7.8 def Penong 6.4
1926	Bookabie def Penong
1927	Bookabie def Penong (3 goals)
1928	Penong 9.15 def Watraba 5.3
1929	Watraba 7.7 def Bookabie 3.2
1930	Penong def Bookabie
1931	No Competition
1932	Penong 13.12 def Bookabie 2.4
1933	Watraba 4.13 def Bookabie 5.6
1934	Penong 3.10 def Watraba 3.5
1935	Bookabie
1936	Charra 6.5 def Bookabie 4.9
1937	Bookabie 13.10 def Koonibba 8.1
1938	Koonibba def Bookabie (5 points)
1939	Koonibba 25.13 def Charra 8.6
1940	Koonibba 8.10 def Penong 6.7
1941-1946	World War 2 Recess
1946	Koonibba 19.22 def Coorabie 5.21
1947	Penong 9.18 def Bookabie 5.7
1948	Fowlers Bay 8.9 def Penong 4.1
1949	Bookabie 25.13 def Penong 6.5
1950	Bookabie 14.14 def Penong 6.5
1951	Bookabie 7.6 def Penong 6.4
1952	Bookabie 13.9 def Coorabie 5.8
1953	Penong 10.10 def Coorabie 7.7
1954	Charra def Coorabie
1955	Bookabie def Charra
1956	Charra 17.14 def Coorabie 3.6
1957	Penong 11.7 def Coorabie 8.7
1958	Bookabie 10.10 def Coorabie 7.14
1959	Coorabie 7.18 def Bookabie 6.6
1960	Bookabie 12.14 def Coorabie 7.3

== Mail Medallists ==
The Mail Medal was awarded from 1950 to 1960; however, the medallists for 1955 and 1956 remain unknown.

Year	Winner	Club	Votes	Runner-up	Club	Votes
1950	Stanley J Oats	Charra	16	Furnest Ware	Bookabie	7
1951	Tom Riddle	Coorabie		Alex Baird	Penong	
1952	Alex Baird	Penong	15			
1953	Furnest Ware	Bookabie	15	Ted Miller	Penong	10
1954	Ray Coleman	Charra				
1955	UNKNOWN					
1956	UNKNOWN					
1957	Ken Ware	Bookabie		Ted Miller		
1958	Milton Dunn	Penong	13	Ted Miller	12	
1959	Dale Shipard	Penong	13	Ted Miller	11	
1960	Dale Shipard	Penong	9	Ken Ware	Bookabie	5
				David Miller	Bookabie	5
				Walter Dunn	Bookabie	5

== Notable performances ==
Ken Ware kicked 14 goals in the 1949 Grand Final, which is equal to the South Australian state country football record of goals in a Grand Final.
