= Simon Cox (Australian rules footballer) =

Australian rules footballer

Personal information
- Born: 25 January 1977 (age 49)
- Original team: Glenelg (SANFL)
- Debut: Round 9, 1995, Footscray vs. Essendon, at MCG
- Height: 192 cm (6 ft 4 in)
- Weight: 95 kg (209 lb)

Playing career^{1}
Years	Club	Games (Goals)
1995–2001	Western Bulldogs	58 (24)
2002–2003	Hawthorn	35 (17)
Total		93 (41)
- ^{1} Playing statistics correct to the end of 2003.

Simon Cox (born 25 January 1977) is a former Australian rules footballer who played with the Western Bulldogs and Hawthorn in the Australian Football League (AFL).

A left footed wingman, from Keith, Cox played his first senior SANFL game at 16 for Glenelg and was recruited to the Western Bulldogs from where he made his league debut in 1995. Cox was delisted in 2001 after 58 games and was picked up by Hawthorn in the draft. He finished second in the 2002 Hawthorn Best and Fairest award. but was de-listed at the end of the 2003 season at the age of 26. Cox later played in the KNTFL for Keith and Naracoorte.
