= Kowree-Naracoorte-Tatiara Football League =

Australian rules football competition

Kowree-Naracoorte-Tatiara Football League
Established
1993
Teams
10
2026 Premiers

2026

2026 Mail Medalist
Harry Tunkin (Kingston)
2026 Leading Goal Kicker
58 - Lewis Hender (Keith)

The Kowree-Naracoorte-Tatiara Football League is an Australian rules football competition based in the Limestone Coast region of South Australia, Australia. It is an affiliated member of the South Australian National Football League. One unusual aspect of the league is that it includes clubs from both South Australia and Victoria. The 2018–21 league medalist was Darcy “Sauce” Boyanton.

== Kowree-Naracoorte-Tatiara Football League ==
In 1993 the Kowree Naracoorte Football League and the Tatiara Football League merged to form the Kowree-Naracoorte-Tatiara Football League. The founding clubs were Apsley, Border Districts, Bordertown, Edenhope, Kaniva & Districts, Keith, Kingston, Kybybolite, Leeor, Lucindale, Mundulla, Naracoorte, Padthaway and Penola.

Kaniva & Districts and Leeor merged in 1997 to form Kaniva Leeor United.

Apsley and Edenhope in 1999 merged to form Edenhope-Apsley and in 2006 moved to the Horsham & District Football League.

== Clubs ==
=== Locations ===
Locations of the Kowree-Naracoorte-Tatiara FL clubs

=== Current ===
Club	Jumper	Nickname	Home Ground	Former League	Est.	Years in comp	KNTFL Senior Premierships	
Club	Jumper	Nickname	Home Ground	Former League	Est.	Years in comp	Total	Years
Border Districts		Eagles	Frances Recreation Reserve, Frances, Goroke Recreation Reserve, Goroke and Apsley Recreation Reserve Apsley	KNFL	1951	1993–	1	2023
Bordertown		Roosters	Bordertown Football Oval, Bordertown	TFL	1908	1993–	1	2012
Keith		Crows	Keith Oval, Keith	TFL	1908	1993–	2	2007, 2008
Kingston		Saints	Gall Park Oval, Kingston SE	KNFL	1966	1993–	1	2026
Kybybolite		Tigers	Kybybolite Oval, Kybybolite	KNFL	1906	1993–	0	-
Lucindale		Kangaroos	Lucindale Oval, Lucindale	KNFL	1895	1993–	4	2005, 2011, 2017, 2022
Mundulla		Tigers	Mundulla Showgrounds, Mundulla	TFL	1905	1993–	14	1994, 1995, 1996, 1997, 1998, 1999, 2000, 2002, 2004, 2018, 2019, 2021, 2024, 2025
Naracoorte		Demons	Naracoorte Sporting Complex, Naracoorte	KNFL	1946	1993–	3	2006, 2009, 2010
Padthaway		Lions	Padthaway Oval, Padthaway	KNFL	1967	1993–	3	1993, 2014, 2015

== Former clubs ==
Club	Jumper	Nickname	Home Ground	Former League	Est.	Years in comp	KNTFL Senior Premierships		Fate
Club	Jumper	Nickname	Home Ground	Former League	Est.	Years in comp	Total	Years	Fate
Apsley		Magpies	Apsley Recreation Reserve, Apsley	KNFL	1890	1993–1998	0	-	Merged with Edenhope to form Edenhope-Apsley in 1999
Edenhope		Bombers	Edenhope Showgrounds, Edenhope	KNFL	c.1910s	1993–1998	0	-	Merged with Apsley to form Edenhope-Apsley in 1999
Edenhope Apsley		Power	Edenhope Showgrounds, Edenhope and Apsley Recreation Reserve Apsley	–	1999	1999–2006	0	-	Moved to Horsham & District FL for 2007 season
Kaniva		Bulldogs	Kaniva Recreation Reserve, Kaniva	TFL	1883	1993–1996	0	-	Merged with Leeor to form Kaniva Leeor United in 1997
Kaniva Leeor United	(1997-?)(?-2019)	Cougars	Kaniva Recreation Reserve, Kaniva	–	1997	1997–2019	0	-	Moved to Horsham & District FL due to COVID-19 border closure in 2020
Leeor		Jets	Serviceton Recreation Reserve, Serviceton	TFL	1950	1993–1996	0	-	Merged with Kaniva to become Kaniva Leeor United in 1997
Penola		Eagles	Penola Oval, Penola	KNFL	1865	1993–2024	4	2001, 2003, 2013, 2016	Moved to Limestone Coast FNL in 2025

== 2007 Ladder ==
KNT	Wins	Byes	Losses	Draws	For	Against	%	Pts	Final	Team	G	B	Pts	Team	G	B	Pts
Keith	15	0	1	0	1965	815	70.68%	60	Elimination	Lucindale	23	13	151	Kybybolite	14	16	100
Penola	13	0	3	0	2080	1052	66.41%	52	Qualifying	Naracoorte	18	14	122	Penola	15	16	106
Naracoorte	12	0	4	0	2094	1215	63.28%	48	1st Semi	Penola	21	17	143	Lucindale	11	11	77
Lucindale	11	0	5	0	2248	1388	61.83%	44	2nd Semi	Keith	15	12	102	Naracoorte	4	9	33
Kybybolite	8	0	8	0	1843	1411	56.64%	32	Preliminary	Penola	26	12	168	Naracoorte	16	16	112
Kingston	8	0	8	0	1934	1557	55.40%	32	Grand	Keith	19	8	122	Penola	10	10	70
Border Districts	8	0	8	0	1490	1787	45.47%	32									
Mundulla	6	0	10	0	1616	1893	46.05%	24									
Bordertown	5	0	11	0	1488	1884	44.13%	20									
Padthaway	2	0	14	0	921	2516	26.80%	8									
Kaniva-Leeor	0	0	16	0	806	2967	21.36%	0									

== 2008 Ladder ==
KNT	Wins	Byes	Losses	Draws	For	Against	%	Pts	Final	Team	G	B	Pts	Team	G	B	Pts
Naracoorte	16	2	0	0	2150	1080	66.56%	64	Elimination	Lucindale	18	9	117	Mundulla	17	8	110
Keith	14	2	2	0	2262	859	72.48%	56	Qualifying	Keith	11	9	75	Kybybolite	7	2	44
Kybybolite	12	2	4	0	1858	1094	62.94%	48	1st Semi	Lucindale	17	11	113	Kybybolite	12	10	82
Lucindale	11	2	5	0	2108	1195	63.82%	44	2nd Semi	Keith	10	12	72	Naracoorte	3	10	28
Mundulla	11	2	5	0	1687	1375	55.09%	44	Preliminary	Naracoorte	19	12	126	Lucindale	19	7	121
Kingston	7	2	9	0	1808	1453	55.44%	28	Grand	Keith	17	9	111	Naracoorte	8	12	60
Bordertown	7	2	9	0	1619	1312	55.24%	28									
Penola	4	2	12	0	993	1716	36.66%	16									
Border Districts	4	2	12	0	968	2287	29.74%	16									
Kaniva-Leeor	2	2	14	0	957	2246	29.88%	8									
Padthaway	0	2	16	0	740	2533	22.61%	0									

== 2009 Ladder ==
KNT	Wins	Byes	Losses	Draws	For	Against	%	Pts	Final	Team	G	B	Pts	Team	G	B	Pts
Naracoorte	13	2	3	0	2288	1025	69.06%	52	Elimination	Kingston	16	8	104	Mundulla	8	11	59
Lucindale	13	2	3	0	2145	1097	66.16%	52	Qualifying	Lucindale	14	15	99	Keith	9	5	59
Keith	13	2	3	0	1705	1095	60.89%	52	1st Semi	Keith	17	14	116	Kingston	10	6	66
Mundulla	10	2	6	0	1591	1299	55.05%	40	2nd Semi	Naracoorte	19	19	133	Lucindale	6	7	43
Kingston	9	2	7	0	1761	1192	59.63%	36	Preliminary	Keith	13	9	87	Lucindale	7	15	57
Penola	8	2	8	0	1495	1463	50.54%	32	Grand	Naracoorte	17	15	117	Keith	11	8	74
Bordertown	7	2	9	0	1584	1466	51.93%	28									
Kybybolite	6	2	10	0	1306	1419	47.93%	24									
Border Districts	4	2	12	0	1115	2096	34.72%	16									
Padthaway	4	2	12	0	1058	1898	35.79%	16									
Kaniva-Leeor	0	2	16	0	556	2554	17.88%	0									

== 2010 Ladder ==
KNT	Wins	Byes	Losses	Draws	For	Against	%	Pts	Final	Team	G	B	Pts	Team	G	B	Pts
Kybybolite	15	0	1	0	2134	1057	66.88%	60	Elimination	Lucindale	14	10	94	Bordertown	12	11	83
Naracoorte	14	0	2	0	2097	1294	61.84%	56	Qualifying	Naracoorte	13	6	84	Mundulla	9	14	68
Mundulla	12	0	4	0	2045	1433	58.80%	48	1st Semi	Mundulla	13	13	91	Lucindale	8	8	56
Bordertown	10	0	6	0	1909	1657	53.53%	40	2nd Semi	Kybybolite	7	1	43	Naracoorte	2	4	16
Lucindale	10	0	6	0	1709	1499	53.27%	40	Preliminary	Naracoorte	17	9	111	Mundulla	10	12	72
Kingston	8	0	8	0	1641	1538	51.62%	32	Grand	Naracoorte	15	14	104	Kybybolite	11	7	73
Keith	6	0	10	0	1469	1777	45.26%	24									
Kaniva-Leeor	5	0	11	0	1444	1753	45.17%	20									
Penola	4	0	12	0	1261	1774	41.55%	16									
Padthaway	3	0	13	0	1118	1852	37.64%	12									
Border Districts	1	0	15	0	1232	2425	33.69%	4									

== 2011 Ladder ==
KNT	Wins	Byes	Losses	Draws	For	Against	%	Pts	Final	Team	G	B	Pts	Team	G	B	Pts
Naracoorte	15	0	1	0	2231	1356	62.20%	60	Elimination	Padthaway	23	9	147	Border District	20	11	131
Lucindale	14	0	2	0	2104	1025	67.24%	56	Qualifying	Lucindale	19	13	127	Kybybolite	10	7	67
Kybybolite	11	0	5	0	1787	1466	54.93%	44	1st Semi	Kybybolite	17	14	116	Padthaway	15	11	101
Border Districts	9	0	7	0	1640	1599	50.63%	36	2nd Semi	Lucindale	28	12	180	Naracoorte	8	10	58
Padthaway	9	0	7	0	1541	1635	48.52%	36	Preliminary	Naracoorte	17	13	115	Kybybolite	14	9	93
Penola	8	0	8	0	1582	1443	52.30%	32	Grand	Lucindale	15	13	103	Naracoorte	11	11	77
Kaniva-Leeor	7	0	9	0	1674	1537	52.13%	28									
Mundulla	6	0	9	1	1677	1479	53.14%	26									
Keith	5	0	10	1	1415	1531	48.03%	22									
Bordertown	3	0	13	0	1353	1898	41.62%	12									
Kingston	0	0	16	0	751	2786	21.23%	0									

== 2012 Ladder ==
KNT	Wins	Byes	Losses	Draws	For	Against	%	Pts	Final	Team	G	B	Pts	Team	G	B	Pts
Kaniva-Leeor	14	2	1	1	2029	924	68.71%	66	Elimination	Padthaway	21	13	139	Mundulla	13	13	91
Keith	11	2	5	0	1793	1389	56.35%	52	Qualifying	Keith	13	7	85	Bordertown	11	7	73
Padthaway	10	2	4	2	1623	1350	54.59%	52	1st Semi	Bordertown	17	12	114	Padthaway	17	7	109
Bordertown	11	1	5	0	1679	1046	61.61%	48	2nd Semi	Kaniva-Leeor	20	16	136	Keith	9	7	61
Mundulla	10	2	6	0	1650	1318	55.59%	48	Preliminary	Bordertown	22	8	140	Keith	11	1	67
Lucindale	10	2	6	0	1546	1236	55.57%	48	Grand	Bordertown	13	13	91	Kaniva-Leeor	12	12	84
Naracoorte	7	2	9	0	1497	1407	51.55%	36									
Penola	5	2	11	0	1158	1698	40.55%	28									
Kybybolite	5	1	10	1	1450	1757	45.21%	26									
Border Districts	2	2	14	0	1342	2259	37.27%	16									
Kingston	1	2	15	0	900	2283	28.28%	12									

== 2013 Ladder ==
KNT	Wins	Byes	Losses	Draws	For	Against	%	Pts	Final	Team	G	B	Pts	Team	G	B	Pts
Bordertown	14	0	2	0	2032	1133	64.20%	56	Elimination	Mundulla	14	8	92	Naracoorte	10	4	64
Keith	14	0	2	0	1892	1209	61.01%	56	Qualifying	Penola	10	15	75	Keith	5	2	32
Penola	13	0	3	0	2404	1248	65.83%	52	1st Semi	Keith	21	18	144	Mundulla	14	14	98
Naracoorte	13	0	3	0	2004	1096	64.65%	52	2nd Semi	Penola	18	14	122	Bordertown	11	11	77
Mundulla	10	0	6	0	1575	1206	56.63%	40	Preliminary	Keith	16	14	110	Bordertown	14	15	99
Border Districts	7	0	9	0	1455	1886	43.55%	28	Grand	Penola	17	10	112	Keith	13	12	90
Kaniva-Leeor	5	0	11	0	1463	1661	46.83%	20									
Padthaway	5	0	11	0	1448	1743	45.38%	20									
Kybybolite	4	0	12	0	1348	2098	39.12%	16									
Kingston	2	0	13	1	1222	2190	35.81%	10									
Lucindale	0	0	15	1	857	2230	27.76%	2									

== 2014 Ladder ==
KNT	Wins	Byes	Losses	Draws	For	Against	%	Pts	Final	Team	G	B	Pts	Team	G	B	Pts
Padthaway	15	2	2	0	2145	1169	64.73%	68	Elimination	Bordertown	25	13	163	Kaniva-Leeor	15	12	102
Penola	13	2	4	0	2288	1059	68.36%	60	Qualifying	Mundulla	14	14	98	Penola	13	6	84
Mundulla	12	2	4	0	1801	1140	61.24%	56	1st Semi	Penola	17	12	114	Bordertown	7	16	58
Kaniva-Leeor	11	2	5	0	1677	1425	54.06%	52	2nd Semi	Padthaway	17	8	110	Mundulla	11	10	76
Bordertown	10	2	6	0	1747	1336	56.67%	48	Preliminary	Penola	16	9	105	Mundulla	15	13	103
Keith	10	2	6	0	1813	1464	55.32%	48	Grand	Padthaway	22	11	143	Penola	13	10	88
Lucindale	6	2	10	0	1592	1729	47.94%	32									
Naracoorte	5	2	11	0	1352	1957	40.86%	28									
Kingston	3	2	13	0	1165	1982	37.02%	20									
Border Districts	2	2	14	0	1197	2241	34.82%	16									
Kybybolite	2	2	14	0	1100	2375	31.65%	16									

== 2015 Ladder ==
KNT	Wins	Byes	Losses	Draws	For	Against	%	Pts	Final	Team	G	B	Pts	Team	G	B	Pts
Keith	16	2	0	0	2019	994	67.01%	72	Elimination	Penola	18	14	122	Lucindale	14	10	94
Padthaway	13	2	3	0	1693	977	63.41%	60	Qualifying	Bordertown	12	12	84	Padthaway	7	9	51
Bordertown	11	2	5	0	1976	1414	58.29%	52	1st Semi	Padthaway	13	14	92	Penola	4	4	28
Lucindale	10	2	6	0	1768	1280	58.01%	48	2nd Semi	Keith	19	9	123	Bordertown	8	6	54
Penola	10	2	6	0	1740	1299	57.26%	48	Preliminary	Padthaway	15	11	101	Bordertown	13	11	89
Kaniva-Leeor	7	2	9	0	1511	1886	44.48%	36	Grand	Padthaway	19	11	125	Keith	8	8	56
Kybybolite	5	2	11	0	1425	1598	47.14%	28									
Naracoorte	5	2	11	0	1302	1619	44.57%	28									
Mundulla	5	2	11	0	1280	1853	40.86%	28									
Border Districts	5	2	11	0	1245	1918	39.36%	28									
Kingston	1	2	15	0	1149	2270	33.61%	12									

== 2016 Ladder ==
KNT	Wins	Byes	Losses	Draws	For	Against	%	Pts	Final	Team	G	B	Pts	Team	G	B	Pts
Penola	14	0	2	0	2144	937	69.59%	56	Elimination	Keith	18	4	112	Mundulla	8	16	64
Lucindale	13	0	3	0	1895	1158	62.07%	52	Qualifying	Kybybolite	11	13	79	Lucindale	10	7	67
Kybybolite	10	0	5	1	1601	1232	56.51%	42	1st Semi	Lucindale	17	8	110	Keith	8	6	54
Keith	10	0	5	1	1483	1306	53.17%	42	2nd Semi	Kybybolite	8	6	54	Penola	6	11	47
Mundulla	10	0	6	0	1599	1189	57.35%	40	Preliminary	Penola	15	18	108	Lucindale	8	5	53
Padthaway	10	0	6	0	1447	1292	52.83%	40	Grand	Penola	19	7	121	Kybybolite	12	15	87
Bordertown	9	0	7	0	1715	1227	58.29%	36									
Naracoorte	6	0	10	0	1196	1309	47.74%	24									
Border Districts	2	0	14	0	989	2096	32.06%	8									
Kaniva-Leeor	2	0	14	0	1009	2313	30.37%	8									
Kingston	1	0	15	0	989	2008	33.00%	4									

== 2017 Ladder ==
KNT	Wins	Byes	Losses	Draws	For	Against	%	Pts	Final	Team	G	B	Pts	Team	G	B	Pts
Mundulla	14	0	2	0	2166	951	69.49%	56	Elimination	Lucindale	14	15	99	Kybybolite	10	9	69
Penola	12	0	3	1	1940	973	66.60%	50	Qualifying	Penola	9	8	62	Lucindale	6	8	44
Keith	12	0	3	1	1438	1048	57.84%	50	1st Semi	Lucindale	15	15	105	Keith	6	4	40
Lucindale	12	0	4	0	1564	1120	58.27%	48	2nd Semi	Mundulla	14	16	100	Penola	7	6	48
Kybybolite	10	0	5	1	1667	1174	58.68%	42	Preliminary	Lucindale	12	8	80	Penola	10	8	68
Padthaway	9	0	7	0	1344	1128	54.37%	36	Grand	Lucindale	12	9	81	Mundulla	9	13	67
Kaniva-Leeor	8	0	7	1	1499	1420	51.35%	34									
Kingston	4	0	12	0	967	1917	33.53%	16									
Naracoorte	3	0	13	0	883	1763	33.37%	12									
Bordertown	1	0	15	0	998	1813	35.50%	4									
Border Districts	1	0	15	0	800	1959	29.00%	4									

== KNTFL A Grade Premierships ==
- 1993 Padthaway
- 1994 Mundulla
- 1995 Mundulla
- 1996 Mundulla
- 1997 Mundulla
- 1998 Mundulla
- 1999 Mundulla
- 2000 Mundulla
- 2001 Penola
- 2002 Mundulla
- 2003 Penola
- 2004 Mundulla
- 2005 Lucindale
- 2006 Naracoorte
- 2007 Keith
- 2008 Keith
- 2009 Naracoorte
- 2010 Naracoorte
- 2011 Lucindale
- 2012 Bordertown
- 2013 Penola
- 2014 Padthaway
- 2015 Padthaway
- 2016 Penola
- 2017 Lucindale
- 2018 Mundulla
- 2019 Mundulla
- 2021 Mundulla
- 2022 Lucindale
- 2023 Border Districts
- 2024 Mundulla
- 2025 Mundulla

== Medalists ==
Virgo Medal

- 1993 Ashley Grant, Kaniva

Mail Medal

- 1993 Bernie Mulraney, Edenhope

Mail Medalists & Virgo Medalists (Combined in 1994)

- 1994 Richard Gould, Lucindale
- 1995 Terry Woodall, Keith
- 1996 Phil Forster, Naracoorte
- 1997 Jamie Walker, Penola
- 1998 Tim Beacham, Apsley
- 1999 Simon Beggs, Kingston
- 2000 Simon Beggs, Kingston
- 2001 Ben Fennell, Penola
- 2002 Aaron Smart and Phil Smith, Lucindale
- 2003 Lindsay Smith, Bordertown
- 2004 Heath Thorpe, Mundulla
- 2005 Nigel Fiegert, Lucindale
- 2006 Hamish Tamlin, Keith
- 2007 Matt Gill, Naracoorte
- 2008 Mark Snowball, Lucindale
- 2009 Adam Pitt, Lucindale
- 2010 Luke Duncan, Penola
- 2011 Craig Beggs, Naracoorte
- 2012 Jared Greenbank, Kaniva Leoor
- 2013 Dylan Coxon, Penola
- 2014 Ben McIntyre, Penola
- 2015 Ben Simounds, Keith
- 2016 Ryan McInerney, Lucindale
- 2017 Simon Berkefeld, Penola
- 2018 George Thring and Tim McIntyre, Keith/Mundulla
- 2019 Scott Spriggs, Lucindale
- 2021 Mark Quinn, Border Districts
- 2022 Rory Taggert, Naracoorte
- 2023 Daniel Bibby (Keith), Josh Gregg (Naracoorte), Zac Richards (B/Districts)
- 2024 Zac Richards, Border Districts
- 2025 Billy Stretch, Kybybolite

== Leading Goalkickers ==
- 1993 Andrew Zealand, Padthaway 76
- 1994 Roger Gibbs, Penola 78
- 1995 Roger Gibbs, Penola 94
- 1996 Matthew Jess, Edenhope 112
- 1997 Roger Gibbs, Penola 106
- 1998 Eric Martin, Keith 85
- 1999 Phil Pedler, Border Districts 103
- 2000 Nick Williams, Mundulla 85
- 2001 Jamie Walker, Penola 108
- 2002 Phil Smith, Lucindale 129
- 2003 Jamie Walker, Penola 136
- 2004 Tim Leach, Mundulla 98
- 2005 Phil Smith, Lucindale 127
- 2006 Stuart Cooper, Kingston 137
- 2007 Stuart Cooper, Kingston 105
- 2008 Nigel Fiegert, Lucindale 99
- 2009 Sam Logan, Naracoorte 108
- 2010 Heath Thorpe, Mundulla 97
- 2011 Simon Cox, Naracoorte 101
- 2012 Ben Gunning, Padthaway 66
- 2013 Adam Merrett, Penola 108
- 2014 Adam Merritt, Penola 120
- 2015 Ben Simound, Keith 105
- 2016 Gene Robinson, Bordertown 78
- 2017 Scott Carberry, Kybyybolite 76
- 2018 Ben Simound, Keith 91
- 2019 Michael Wundke, Kaniva Leeor 66
- 2021 Tobin Cox, Padthaway 69
- 2022 Rory Taggert, Naracoorte 66
- 2023 Zac Peake, Naracoorte, 66
- 2024 Jacob Eats, Bordertown 66
- 2025 Ben Simounds, Keith 67

== Notable players from the area ==
The KNFL, TFL and KNTFL have produced:

- Aaron Fiora, Angus Schumacher – Naracoorte
- John Hinge, Mitch Hinge – Mundulla
- Michael Taylor, Daniel Bell, Luke Pedlar – Kingston
- Glenn Hawker, Roger Merrett, Alastair Clarkson – Kaniva
- Jack Redden, Simon Cox – Keith
- Jack Trengove, Alex Forster, Lachie Neale – Kybybolite
- Reg Burgess, Murrie Batt – Apsley
- Graeme MacKenzie, Phil Carman, Brad Cassidy – Edenhope
- Stephen Copping, Andrew McKay, Darcy Fogarty, Will Gould – Lucindale
- Lincoln McCarthy, Lindsay Smith, David Grenvold – Bordertown

Additionally some famous SANFL and AFL footballers have played in the league, including:

- Tony Modra, Jim West, Sudjai Cook ,- Keith
- Barrie Barbary, Ray Whittaker, Peter Woite – Kybybolite
- Nigel Fiegert, Steven Brosnan, Phil Smith, Tom Logan – Lucindale
- Donald Dickie, Bernie Vince, Daniel Hargraves – Border Districts
- Simon Cox, Chris Ladhams – Naracoorte
- Steven Sims, Scott Welsh, Ian Perrie, Justin Cicolella, Wade Thompson, Daniel Menzel – Padthaway
- Cameron Hitchcock – Kaniva Leeor
- Matthew Lloyd – Penola

== Books ==
- Encyclopedia of South Australian country football clubs / compiled by Peter Lines. ISBN 9780980447293
- South Australian country football digest / by Peter Lines ISBN 9780987159199
