= Richard Charles Guthridge =

British merchant seaman

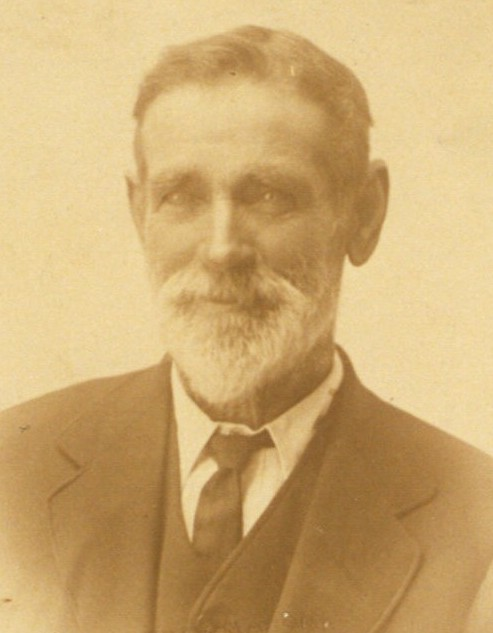
- Born: Richard Charles Gutteridge; 11 June 1837; Poplar, London, England, United Kingdom
- Died: 13 October 1934 (Age 97); Charam, Victoria, Australia
- Resting place: Edenhope Cemetery, Edenhope, Victoria
- Occupations: Merchant seaman; farmer
- Spouse: Eliza Guthridge (nee Pitts)
- Children: 13

Richard Charles Guthridge (11 June 1837 – 13 October 1934) was a British merchant seaman and was recognised in 1998 by the Premier of Victoria in Australia as one of the earliest and most significant pioneers of the State. He notably worked for the Henty Brothers, who established the first permanent Victorian settlement in Portland, upon his arrival in Australia. Richard ultimately settled in Charam, near Edenhope, in Victoria and raised 13 children, most of whom lived to their 80s and 90s. When he died at the age of 97, Richard left a strong legacy in Australia in the form of his contributions to the fledgling colony and his hundreds of descendants.

== Life ==
=== Early years ===
Richard Charles Guthridge (also spelt Gutteridge and Guttridge in different records) was born in Poplar, East London on 11 June 1837, the son of James Gutteridge and Ann Illingworth. He was baptised at St Anne's Limehouse on 2 July 1837. Richard had at least three siblings, Susannah Hall (b. 22 February 1832), Mary Ann Susannah (b. 17 April 1835) and James John (b. 19 September 1842), each born to James and Ann Gutteridge. James and Ann were married on 4 January 1841 at St Dunstan's church in Stepney, indicating that Richard and two of his siblings were born several years out of wedlock. James Gutteridge worked as a sawyer near East London's docks and also as a merchant seaman. James and Ann Gutteridge lived at 17 Whitehorse Street in Limehouse when they were married in January 1841 and were still living at this address when son James John Gutteridge was christened in September 1842. The 1841 Census finds Richard aged 4 and his mother Ann working as a laundress at Catherine's Place, All Saints Poplar but there is no mention of his other siblings or his father. Likewise, the 1851 Census finds Ann Gutteridge working as a mangler in Limehouse whilst caring for the 8 year-old James Junior. James Senior's work as a mariner would explain his absence from the 1841 and 1851 census records. It remains unclear whether Richard's siblings survived to adulthood or whether they maintained contact with their brother after his arrival in Australia. However, the Gutteridges living in East London appear to have been a close-knit family because the 1851 Census shows Ann Gutteridge living next door to Elizabeth Gutteridge (her sister-in-law and Richard's aunt) and her family in Limehouse, East London. Additionally, William Gutteridge (James Gutteridge's brother and Richard's uncle) and his daughter Hannah are recorded as visitors of Elizabeth Gutteridge in the 1861 Census. This suggests that Richard would certainly have known his aunts, uncles and cousins on his father's side very well.

Richard followed in his father's footsteps by becoming a mariner at a young age and even looks to have sailed with his father on at least one occasion. The Merchant Shipping Act 1844 (7 & 8 Vict. c. 112) stipulated that every British seaman should have a register ticket. These records confirm that Richard's seaman's ticket (ticket number 473023) was issued in London on 24 November 1851 and that he first went to sea at the age of 14. For his first official voyage he joined the crew of the "Albermarle" for a round trip from London to ports in Australia, leaving London on 29 November 1851 and returning on 21 January 1853. The Master of this vessel was John F Trivett and the Agreement and Crew List (A&CL) states that Richard acted as a Caddy/Servant on this voyage. Several crewmen deserted the vessel in Adelaide in 1852 in pursuit of the goldfields but Richard returned to London and was honourably discharged on 24 January 1853. The Albermarle's A&CL also shows that a James Gutteridge (ticket number 18987), aged 36 and born in Poplar, worked as a Steward on this voyage alongside Richard. This is almost certainly Richard's father and he was discharged in London on 5 February 1853.

Richard subsequently joined the crew of the "Index" and made voyages in 1853 and 1854. In 1854 the 220-ton Index travelled to Saint Kitts in the West Indies. Although Richard had planned to stay and work on a local banana plantation, he was forced to return to London due to poor health. He later joined the crew of the "Severn" under Captain Scowcroft and travelled again to Australia, leaving London on 7 October 1855 and arriving on 31 December 1855. A contemporary account from a passenger travelling on another Australia-bound vessel described the excitement of arriving into Portland Bay after the 3-month voyage and the sighting of the Severn in November 1852:

Friday — A warm morning, and the wind is fair, and we are sailing at about six miles an hour, within 50 miles of Portland Bay. We saw four great whales playing grandly in the blue element, and blowing their steam upward. Saturday — This morning the wind was rising and threatening to blow us from our desired course, towards Van Diemen’s Land; but before night it became fair. In the afternoon we discovered a ship directly ahead of us, and we soon caught up with her; her name was the “Severn”, out of London, bound for Australia, and full of emigrants. It was an impressive sight—the two ships saluting each other, with every mark of respect and good cheer. The “Severn” had been out for 103 days, and ourselves 106.

The arrival of the Severn into Portland Bay in December 1855 generated additional excitement in the colony because the vessel transported a famous racehorse called "King Alfred" from England. The celebrated four-year-old thorough bred stood fifteen and a half hands and was imported by its owner Mr Richard Lewis, apparently as breeding stock for the local racehorsing industry.

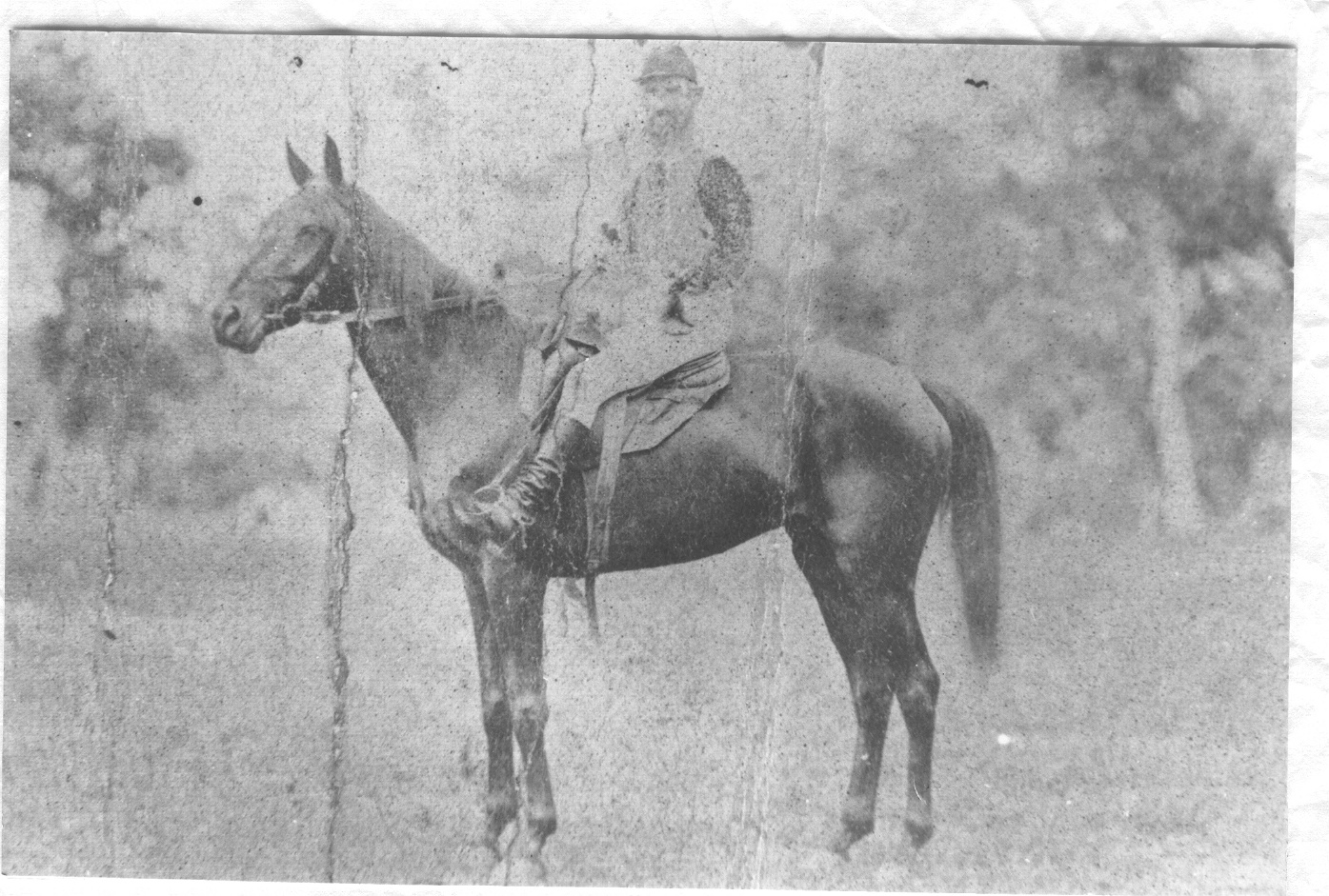
The racehorse "King Alfred"

=== Arrival and life in Australia ===
Richard was discharged from the Severn in March 1856 and was employed by the Henty Brothers in their store. Shortly after this he met and married Eliza Pitts (1844 – 1913, born in Keinton, Somerset, England), the daughter of Frederick Richard Pitts and Julia Galer. Their marriage ceremony was conducted at the residence of a Mrs Rhodes in Wattle Hill, Portland, Australia on 30 August 1860. According to his marriage certificate, Richard was working as a labourer at this time, most likely in the employ of the Hentys. The couple lived in Portland for some years and then moved to Millicent in South Australia where Richard carted the stone for the building of the hospital.

Shortly after this Richard and his family returned to south-west Victoria and took up land one mile NW of Carapook. Contemporary records showed that Richard, with 4 school-aged children, added his signature to the 1875 petition aimed at establishing a new school at Carapook. As a small settlement on the wagon route north from Portland Bay, Carapook was originally a part of the "Muntham" Pastoral Run settled by the Henty Brothers in 1837. The land around Carapook was made available to Selectors after 1850 and many settlers came to the region and secured blocks of land. The early pioneers would have faced many difficulties as timber had to be transported from nearby Digby due to the limited availability of timber for houses and public buildings in Carapook. Many trees had to be felled with saws and axes and carted by bullock drays to Carapook. Frequently, the drays would become bogged at river crossings and there were few bridges or opportunities to make a firm crossing.

Despite building a new life for himself and his family in Carapook, Richard selected land in the Charam district near Edenhope in 1880 where he and Eliza successfully raised their 13 children. In the Australian Electoral Rolls from 1909 Richard stated his occupation as "farmer", indicating that he continued to work this land well into his old age.

== Death and legacy ==
=== Death ===
Richard's beloved wife Eliza predeceased him by two decades. In a letter to his son George Henry on 4 April 1919, Richard described the pain of losing his wife:

"... my dear boy it dose (sic) not seem like cumminge (sic) home since your dear mother as gonne (sic) I do fell (sic) lonley (sic) without her but I know she is better off she has gonne (sic) to be with Blessed Jesus wheras (sic) I hope we shall all meet her up their wear (sic) all is joy and peace and my dear girl. I shall neaver (sic) forget you and your kindness and dear George this is my prayer every night ..."

Richard Guthridge died aged 97 on 13 October 1934 in Charam, Victoria and was buried beside Eliza in the Edenhope Cemetery. Richard died at his daughter Annie's home in the presence of his youngest son, John. He was 97 and considered by the pioneers of the district as one of the earliest pioneers of the Western District. The following obituary was printed shortly after his death in the "Edenhope Newspaper" in 1934:

Brief reference was made in a recent issue of the death at the residence of his daughter Mrs James HADDEN, of Charam on Oct 13th of Mr Richard GUTHRIDGE aged 97 years, an old pioneer of Western Victoria. The deceased was born in East End London. His father died when he was 12 months old. When Mr GUTHRIDGE was 9 years of age, he was engaged by Capt. MOFFAT on three occasions to go to the East Indies to work on a banana plantation but his health broke down and he had to return each time. He was then engaged by Capt PIVETT to work on a ship the "SEVERN" bound for Port Adelaide. They birthed on the first "Black Thursday" (February 1851), and after discharging the cargo, returned to London. His next trip was to Portland with merchandise and stock for the Hentys. He left the ship at Portland and was employed by the HENTY Brothers in their store, the ship returning to London. When the ship came again to Portland, the sailors all deserted and went to the goldfields. Capt. PIVETT had to make up a crew of landsmen and the first to join was Mr. GUTHRIDGE. The Henty's were agreeable of him going so he again joined the "SEVERN". On the return trip the ship was loaded with stock for the Hentys and immigrants. Among the stock brought out on this trip were two horses. "King Alfred" the racehorse and Croumer the draught horse. Maurice EDWARDS of Casterton was head groom. Mr GUTHRIDGE was again employed by the Hentys on his return. Soon after he married in Portland to Miss PITTS. The couple lived in Portland for some time and after at Millicent. Mr GUTHRIDGE carted the stone for the building of the hospital at Millicent. Mt GUTHRIDGE took up land at Carapook, but in 1880 he selected land at Charam district where he lived until his death. His wife predeceased him 20 years ago. His family, Ann (Mrs J HADDEN), William (Adelaide), Sarah (Mrs Tom OUGH, Portland), Fred (deceased), Richard (deceased), Bessie (Mrs N FLOWERS, Merino), George (Digby), Nellie (Mrs HADDEN, Nareen), Emily (Charam), Julia (Mrs N BURGESS, Branxholme), Harry (Coleraine), Jack (Ullswater). The funeral was held at the Church of England, Edenhope. Pall bearers were George(son), David and Gordon OUGH, Jim and Bill HADDEN and Angus CAMERON.

Some of the details contained in the obituary vary from the recorded facts. For example, Richard's seaman ticket states that his voyage on the "Albermarle" when he was 14 years old was his first, and he records here that he hadn't worked on any previous vessels. The obituary also states that he worked under Captain Moffat during his trips to the East Indies. In reality, Captain Moffat was the master of the "Parrock Hall" and this vessel made several trips to the West Indies between 1847 and 1851. According to the Parrock Hall's crew lists, Richard's father James was the Steward on the 1849 and 1850 voyages so it is possible that Richard travelled with him as a boy but had no official duties on the ship. Additionally, the Captain Pivett referred to in the obituary was most likely Captain Trivett and he was the master of the vessel "Albemarle" and not the "Severn." Finally, the obituary states that Richard's father died when he was only 12 months old and this appears to contradict much of the evidence that has been collected. Burial records in Poplar indicate that a James Gutteridge died aged 59 years in July 1839 but this would appear to be Richard's grandfather (also called James, born in 1781). Hence, it is possible that the obituary refers to the death of Richard's grandfather at a young age and not his father.

The discrepancies are understandable given that the obituary was would have been written by one of Richard's children and not himself. Richard also suffered from senility in his final years so he may have had trouble recollecting the facts perfectly. Additionally, the oldest of Richard's children would have been in their 70s themselves so their own recollections would be questionable due to the passage of time. Nevertheless, the obituary provides rich biographical information that can be largely substantiated by the records of the day.

=== Children ===
Richard Guthridge and Eliza Pitts raised 13 children together and they now have hundreds of descendants across Australia and other parts of the world. Many of them had extremely long lives like their father. With an average of 78.6 yrs between them, the Guthridge family held the Western District's longevity record in 1950. Four of Richard's children lived into their 80s and four lived into their 90s, with two reaching the age of 99. Below are the names of Richard and Eliza's children and their spouses:

- Annie Eliza b. 1862, Portland, Vic, d. 1959, m. James Hadden, 1855-1934.
- William James b. 1864, Portland, Vic, d. ......? m. Susan Agnes Ough, 1866-?
- Sarah Jane b. 1866, Portland, Vic, d. 1964, m. Thomas Ough, 1862-1940.
- Frederick James b. 1868, Portland, Vic, d. 1933, m. Alice Maud Mary Byrne, 1876-1950.
- Richard Charles b. 1870, Co Dundas, Vic, d. 1929, m. Mary Smith, 1875-1955.
- Hannah Maria 'Bessie' b. 1872, Coleraine, Vic, d. 1957, m. Neil Walter Flowers, 1870-1951.
- George Henry 'Gutty' b. 1874, Co Dundas, Vic, m 1. Emma Lucy Burgess, 1875-1912, 2. Eleanor Mary Hide 1874-1956.
- Ellen Louisa b. 1876, Coleraine, Vic, d. 1962, m. William Hadden, 1864-1927.
- Emily Augusta b. 1878, Coleraine, Vic, d. 1976.
- Julia Edith b. 1880, Carapook, Vic, d. 1972, m. Nathaniel John Burgess, 1874-1965.
- Harry b. 1883, Carapook, Vic, d. 1959, m. Elizabeth May Biggin, 1884-1980.
- John b. 1888, Harrow, Vic, d. 1955, m. Irene Hannah Clarke, 1892-1960.
- Elizabeth b. 1888, Harrow, Vic, d. 1888.

The last of Richard’s living grandchildren - Joyce Bowles - celebrated her 100th birthday on Friday, October 17, 2025. She lived in the Edenhope area her whole life and recalled Richard fondly from her childhood.

=== Recognition and reunion ===
On 7 December 1996 320 of Richard's 3000 Australian descendants gathered in Portland Victoria to celebrate his life and legacy. The festivities commenced with the firing of a cannon on the Portland foreshore by Jim Guthridge from Edenhope who, at the age of 85, was the oldest participant at the reunion. This was the final time a live cannon was fired in the State of Victoria. This was followed by a reenactment of Richard's arrival on the Portland foreshore. Sea cadets rowed a clinker boat from the TS Henty with three of Richard's great great grandchildren on board: James Richard Guthridge, 20; Rodney Guthridge, 32; and Erin Freame, 21. They landed on the foreshore to the sounds of bagpipes played by Jacqueline Holmes, another of Richard's descendants. Other highlights of the historic reunion included a vintage car parade, rides for attendees on Cobb & Co coaches, and an extensive photographic exhibition. A group photograph was taken in front of the historic Mac's Hotel which was built in 1855 and would have greeted Richard when he arrived in Portland 140 years earlier. The Portland Shire President Shirley Elliot unveiled a plaque commemorating Richard's arrival in and contributions to the embryonic State.

In recognition of the contribution to the State of Victoria, Jeff Kennett AC MLC, the Premier of Victoria, unveiled a plaque on the Portland foreshore on 23 November 1998 dedicated to Richard. In his speech, Kennett recognised Richard's role as one of the foremost settlers in the State of Victoria.

Plaque dedicated to Richard Guthridge, Portland foreshore, Victoria, Australia

.
