= Koonibba Football Club =

Koonibba Football Club is an Australian rules football club situated in the small Aboriginal Australian community of Koonibba, South Australia. Founded in 1906, it is the oldest surviving Aboriginal football club in Australia. The players are known as the Koonibba Roosters.

The Lutheran missionaries at Koonibba Mission (founded in 1901), helped the residents of the mission to establish the football club, which played against teams from Denial Bay, Charra, Penong and Ceduna.

The club is a current member of the Western Eyre Football League and a former member of the Far West Football Association.

At the celebrations for its 100th year in existence, 23 of its players past and present were added to the club's Team of the Century.

AFL footballer Gavin Wanganeen's great-grandfather played for Koonibba.
