= Kowree Naracoorte Football League =

The Kowree Naracoorte Football League was an Australian rules football competition based around Naracoorte, South Australia and the Kowree region of Victoria.

== History ==
Prior to the Kowree Naracoorte Football League, Naracoorte had a team in the South Eastern Football Association which was based in Mount Gambier however this competition declined and the Naracoorte side split into Naracoorte North and South.

This saw the Naracoorte Football Association revived for 1935, but it was short lived as the next year Lucindale left to the Southern Ports Football League leaving Kybybolite, North and South Naracoorte to join Apsley, Edenhope and Frances in the Kowree Football Association based around Edenhope, Victoria. After a successful 1936 season it was suggested that the league would be renamed the Kowree Naracoorte Football League.

Lucindale joined the KNFL from the Southern Ports League in 1946, while the two Naracoorte clubs merged for the same time that year. South and North Naracoorte were re-formed in 1950; however, they merged again the following year. Unusually, the newly re-formed Naracoorte club decided to field two B-grade sides for the 1951 season. 1951 also saw Frances merge with North Kowree FA club Minimay to form Border Districts after it was determined that Frances would struggle to form an A-grade side and Minimay would only field a B-grade side.

Further additions to the league included Kingston – a merger of the Kingston-based sides of the Southern Ports Football League – in 1966, the newly-formed Padthaway club in 1967 and Western Border club Penola in 1988.

The league continued until 1993 when the KNFL merged with the Tatiara Football League to create the Kowree-Naracoorte-Tatiara Football League. All the KNFL clubs joined this new league.

== Final clubs in 1992 ==
Club	Jumper	Nickname	Home Ground	Former League	Est.	Years in comp	KNFL Senior Premierships	
Club	Jumper	Nickname	Home Ground	Former League	Est.	Years in comp	Total	Years
Apsley		Magpies	Apsley Recreation Reserve, Apsley	KFA	1890	1936-1992	7	1945, 1948, 1949, 1952, 1955, 1965, 1985
Border Districts		Eagles	Frances Recreation Reserve, Frances and Minimay Recreation Reserve, Minimay	–	1951	1951-1992	8	1962, 1967, 1975, 1976, 1979, 1980, 1981, 1991
Edenhope		Bombers	Edenhope Showgrounds, Edenhope	KFA	c.1910s	1936-1992	11	1944, 1946, 1950, 1957, 1958, 1960, 1971, 1972, 1986, 1987, 1988
Kingston	(1966-67)(1968-)	Saints	Gall Park Oval, Kingston SE	–	1966	1966-1992	3	1982, 1983, 1984
Kybybolite		Tigers	Kybybolite Oval, Kybybolite	NFA	1906	1936-1992	8	1939, 1951, 1956, 1959, 1961, 1966, 1973, 1974
Lucindale		Kangaroos	Lucindale Oval, Lucindale	SPFL	1895	1946-1992	3	1947, 1969, 1970
Naracoorte		Demons	Naracoorte Sporting Complex, Naracoorte	–	1946	1946-1949, 1951-1992	7	1953, 1954, 1963, 1964, 1977, 1978, 1992
Padthaway		Lions	Padthaway Oval, Padthaway	–	1967	1967-1992	0	-
Penola		Eagles	Penola Oval, Penola	WBFL	1865	1988-1992	2	1989, 1990

== Previous clubs ==
Club	Jumper	Nickname	Home Ground	Former League	Est.	Years in comp	KNFL Senior Premierships		Fate
Club	Jumper	Nickname	Home Ground	Former League	Est.	Years in comp	Total	Years	Fate
Frances		Eagles	Frances Recreation Reserve, Frances	KFA	1905	1936-1950	1	1937	Merged with Minimay from the North Kowree FA in 1951 to form Border Districts
North Naracoorte			Naracoorte Showgrounds, Naracoorte	NFA	1936	1936-1945, 1950	1	1940	Merged with South Naracoorte after WWII, returned for 1950 then merged again
South Naracoorte			Naracoorte Showgrounds, Naracoorte	NFA	1936	1936-1945, 1950	2	1936, 1938	Merged with North Naracoorte after WWII, returned for 1950 then merged again

== Senior Premiers ==
- 1936 South Naracoorte
- 1937 Frances
- 1938 South Naracoorte
- 1939 Kybybolite
- 1940 North Naracoorte
- 1941-1943 Recess - WWII
- 1944 Edenhope
- 1945 Apsley
- 1946 Edenhope
- 1947 Lucindale
- 1948 Apsley
- 1949 Apsley
- 1950 Edenhope
- 1951 Kybybolite
- 1952 Apsley
- 1953 Naracoorte
- 1954 Naracoorte
- 1955 Apsley
- 1956 Kybybolite
- 1957 Edenhope
- 1958 Edenhope
- 1959 Naracoorte
- 1960 Edenhope
- 1961 Kybybolite
- 1962 Border Districts
- 1963 Naracoorte
- 1964 Naracoorte
- 1965 Apsley
- 1966 Kybybolite
- 1967 Border Districts
- 1968 Kybybolite
- 1969 Lucindale
- 1970 Lucindale
- 1971 Edenhope
- 1972 Edenhope
- 1973 Kybybolite
- 1974 Kybybolite
- 1975 Border Districts
- 1976 Border Districts
- 1977 Naracoorte
- 1978 Naracoorte
- 1979 Border Districts
- 1980 Border Districts
- 1981 Border Districts
- 1982 Kingston
- 1983 Kingston
- 1984 Kingston
- 1985 Apsley
- 1986 Edenhope
- 1987 Edenhope
- 1988 Edenhope
- 1989 Penola
- 1990 Penola
- 1991 Border Districts
- 1992 Naracoorte
