= Southern Ports Football League =

The Southern Ports Football League was an Australian rules football competition in the Limestone Coast region of South Australia, Australia. The competition ran from 1928 until 1965.

== History ==
The Southern Ports Football Association started in 1928 featuring Robe, Kingston and Mount Benson. Beachport and Lucindale would join in 1936, Lucindale would win 3 premierships in a row before the league went into recess for World War II

The league returned in 1946 but Mount Benson went into recess and Lucindale left to the Kowree Naracoorte, however the Lucindale B side played the season in the Southern Ports. The Kingston side would split into Kingston North and Kingston South but still operate as the one club. However, in 1950 the clubs would become separate entities, Kingston North would be renamed Rovers and Kingston South became Ramblers. Ramblers would alter their name to Port Caroline Ramblers to represent the early history of Kingston. Reedy Creek joined in 1948 which would create a five team competition.

In the later years of the league, player numbers became an issue with sixteen players per side. In 1965 Reedy Creek merged with Rovers, the league had four sides for only one season as the Southern Ports disbanded in 1966. Robe joined the Mid South Eastern, the Kingston sides merged to join the Kowree Naracoorte and Beachport folded.

== Clubs ==
Final Season 1965

Club	Jumper	Nickname	Home Ground	Former League	Est.	Years in comp	SPFL Senior Premierships		Fate
Club	Jumper	Nickname	Home Ground	Former League	Est.	Years in comp	Total	Years	Fate
Beachport		Eagles	Beachport Cricket Oval, Beachport	MSEFL	1906	1936–1946, 1948–1965	2	1958, 1959	Moved to Mid South Eastern FL in 1947, returned in 1948, folded in 1966
Port Caroline Ramblers (Note: Known as Kingston South until 1949)			Gall Park Oval, Kingston SE	–	1947	1947–1965	4	1950, 1952, 1960, 1961	Merged with Rovers United to form Kingston in Kowree Naracoorte FL in 1966
Robe		Roosters	Robe Oval, Robe	–	1928	1928–1965	12	1931, 1932, 1933, 1948, 1953, 1955, 1956, 1957, 1962, 1963, 1964, 1965	Moved to Mid South Eastern FL in 1966
Rovers United			Gall Park Oval, Kingston SE and Reedy Creek Oval, Reedy Creek	–	1965	1965	0	-	Merged with Port Caroline to form Kingston in Kowree Naracoorte FL in 1966

Previous Clubs

Club	Jumper	Nickname	Home Ground	Former League	Est.	Years in comp	SPFL Senior Premierships		Fate
Club	Jumper	Nickname	Home Ground	Former League	Est.	Years in comp	Total	Years	Fate
Kingston			Gall Park Oval, Kingston SE	–	1893	1928–1946	3	1928, 1929, 1930	Split into Kingston North and Kingston South in 1947
Lucindale		Kangaroos	Lucindale Oval, Lucindale	NFA	1895	1936–1940	3	1937, 1938, 1939	Moved to Kowree Naracoorte FL in 1946
Lucindale B		Kangaroos	Lucindale Oval, Lucindale	NFA	1895	1946	0	-	Rejoined Lucindale in 1947
Mount Benson			Mount Benson Station, Mount Benson	–	c.1900	1928–1940	0	-	Folded after WW2 recess in 1946
Reedy Creek		Creeks	Reedy Creek Oval, Reedy Creek	–	1948	1948–1964	0	-	Merged with Rovers to form Rovers United in 1965
Rovers (Note: Known as Kingston North until 1949)		Tigers	Gall Park Oval, Kingston SE	–	1947	1947–1964	2	1947, 1949	Merged with Reedy Creek to form Rovers United in 1965
