= Reg Burgess =

Australian rules footballer (1934–2024)

Personal information
- Full name: Reginald Mark Burgess
- Born: 6 August 1934; Apsley, Victoria, Australia
- Died: 13 May 2024 (aged 89)
- Original team: Apsley
- Height: 175 cm (5 ft 9 in)
- Weight: 72 kg (159 lb)
- Positions: Centre, wing

Playing career^{1}
Years	Club	Games (Goals)
1954–1960	Essendon	124 (9)
- ^{1} Playing statistics correct to the end of 1960.

Career highlights
- Best and fairest 1957, 1960

Reginald Mark Burgess (6 August 1934 – 12 May 2024) was an Australian rules footballer who played 124 Victorian Football League (VFL) (VFL) games for the Essendon Football Club.

== Football ==
External videos
- Country Roots: Reg Burgess, Bomber TV, Essendon Football Club.
- Reg Burgess - 2015 Hall of Fame & Milestones, Bomber TV, Essendon Football Club.

Burgess was a centreman, recruited from Apsley, after he finished second in the Kowree Naracoorte Mail Medal as an 18 year old. Burgess debuted for Essendon in 1954. He was one of Essendon's best players in the 1950s and won the club's best and fairest in 1957 and 1960. He represented Victoria in 1957-58 and 1960.

Burgess left Essendon in 1960 at the age of 26 to captain-coach Casterton in the South-East & Border Football League. He was paid more in one season for Casterton than his entire Essendon career. He would lead Casterton to three premierships and returned to Apsley to win another premiership.

== Personal life and death ==
Reginald Mark Burgess was born in Apsley, Victoria on 6 August 1934. He married Margaret Ryan in 1957. Burgess was the father in law of VFL/AFL player Roger Merrett who married his daughter Sharon. Burgess was also the grandfather of Emily Burgess who played netball in the Suncorp Super Netball.

Burgess died on 13 May 2024, at the age of 89.

== Awards and honours ==
In 2002 an Essendon panel ranked him at 13 in their Champions of Essendon list of the 25 greatest players ever to have played for Essendon.

Burgess was inducted into Essendon's Hall of Fame in 2015.

== See also ==
- 1958 Melbourne Carnival
- Essendon Football Club's Team of the Century
- Champions of Essendon
- Essendon Football Club's Hall of Fame
