= Tatiara Football League =

Australian rules football competition

The Tatiara Football League was an Australian rules football competition based around the Tatiara region of South Australia and the West Wimmera region of Victoria.

== History ==
The Tatiara Football League was formed when the Bordertown and Mundulla clubs met in May 1911 with a view of forming a football association. Pine Hill, Wolseley and Keith were invited to join with only Wolseley accepting the offer. The TFL remained a 3-club competition until 1921 when Keith and Serviceton first affiliated with the league. Kaniva joined for a short stint in 1924 and re-entered in 1927 alongside Lillimur. They left following the 1929 season before fully committing to the TFL in 1932.

The Page playoff system was introduced for the first time in 1932 and would remain the finals format for the vast majority of the TFL's existence. The 1930s saw a relatively changeable roster of clubs participating, with Lillimur, Serviceton, Wolseley, Federals and Goroke all playing sporadically through the decade. The competition entered recess following the 1940 season due to decreasing public support brought about by World War II.

The TFL re-formed in 1946. Despite winning the most recent premiership in 1940, Goroke were excluded on grounds of distance from the rest of the clubs. Lillimur and Serviceton merged to form Leeor prior to the 1950 season, after which the TFL entered a long period of stability, with the only changes to the line-up of clubs being the admission of Tintinara from the Lakes District Association in 1954 and the demise of Wolseley after the 1963 season.

The league continued until 1993 when the TFL merged with the Kowree Naracoorte Football League to create the Kowree-Naracoorte-Tatiara Football League.

== Final Clubs in 1992 ==
Club	Jumper	Nickname	Home Ground	Former League	Est.	Years in TFL	TFL Senior Premierships		Fate
Club	Jumper	Nickname	Home Ground	Former League	Est.	Years in TFL	Total	Years	Fate
Bordertown		Roosters	Bordertown Football Oval, Bordertown	–	1908	1911-1992	19	1919, 1920, 1922, 1923, 1926, 1939, 1949, 1957, 1967, 1968, 1971, 1972, 1975, 1976, 1984, 1986, 1987, 1990, 1992	Formed Kowree-Naracoorte-Tatiara FL in 1993
Kaniva		Bulldogs	Kaniva Recreation Reserve, Kaniva	WWFA	1884	1924, 1927–1929, 1934–1992	13	1924, 1928, 1935, 1953, 1958, 1960, 1961, 1963, 1964, 1965, 1969, 1970, 1985	Formed Kowree-Naracoorte-Tatiara FL in 1993
Keith		Magpies	Keith Oval, Keith	CFA	1908	1921-1992	8	1954, 1955, 1962, 1978, 1979, 1980, 1981, 1982	A-grade side played in Cardwell FA between 1945 and 1948. Formed Kowree-Naracoorte-Tatiara FL in 1993
Leeor		Bombers	Serviceton Recreation Reserve, Serviceton	–	1950	1950-1992	4	1950, 1952, 1966, 1974	Formed Kowree-Naracoorte-Tatiara FL in 1993
Mundulla		Tigers	Mundulla Showgrounds, Mundulla	–	1905	1911-1992	20	1911, 1913, 1921, 1925, 1927, 1929, 1930, 1931, 1932, 1934, 1937, 1938, 1948, 1951, 1959, 1973, 1983, 1988, 1989, 1991	Formed Kowree-Naracoorte-Tatiara FL in 1993
Tintinara		Blues	Tintinara Oval, Tintinara	LDFA	1912	1954-1992	1	1977	Merged with Border Downs to form Border Downs-Tintinara in River Murray FL in 1993

== Former Clubs ==
Club	Jumper	Nickname	Home Ground	Former League	Est.	Years in TFL	TFL Senior Premierships		Fate
Club	Jumper	Nickname	Home Ground	Former League	Est.	Years in TFL	Total	Years	Fate
Border Warriors		Warriors	Serviceton Recreation Reserve, Serviceton and Wolseley Oval, Wolseley	–	1935	1935	0	-	De-merged into Serviceton and Wolseley in 1936
Federals			Sandsmere Recreation Reserve, Sandsmere and Miram Recreation Reserve, Miram	WWFA	1910s	1934-1947	0	-	Absorbed by Kaniva in 1948
Goroke		Magpies	Goroke Recreation Reserve, Goroke	KFA	1890s	1940	1	1940	Moved to Central Wimmera FL in 1947
Lillimur			Lillimur Recreation Reserve, Lillimur	–	1927	1927-1929, 1934–1949	1	1947	Merged with Serviceton in 1950 to form Leeor
Serviceton	Dark with light band		Serviceton Recreation Reserve, Serviceton	–	1889	1921, 1926–1934, 1936–1949	2	1933, 1936, 1946	Played merged with Wolseley as Border Warriors in 1935. Merged with Lillimur in 1950 to form Leeor
Wolseley			Wolseley Oval, Wolseley	–	1903	1911-1934, 1936-1963	2	1914, 1915	Played merged with Serviceton as Border Warriors in 1935. Folded after 1963 season

== Senior Premiers ==
=== TFL Premiers ===
- 1911 Mundulla
- 1912 Wolseley or Mundulla
- 1913 Mundulla
- 1914 Wolseley
- 1915 Wolseley
- 1916-18 Recess - WWI
- 1919 Bordertown
- 1920 Bordertown
- 1921 Mundulla
- 1922 Bordertown
- 1923 Bordertown
- 1924 Kaniva
- 1925 Mundulla
- 1926 Bordertown
- 1927 Mundulla
- 1928 Kaniva
- 1929 Mundulla
- 1930 Mundulla
- 1931 Mundulla
- 1932 Mundulla
- 1933 Serviceton
- 1934 Mundulla
- 1935 Kaniva
- 1936 Serviceton
- 1937 Mundulla
- 1938 Mundulla
- 1939 Bordertown
- 1940 Goroke
- 1941-46 Recess - WWII
- 1946 Serviceton
- 1947 Lillimur
- 1948 Mundulla
- 1949 Bordertown
- 1950 Leeor
- 1951 Mundulla
- 1952 Leeor
- 1953 Kaniva
- 1954 Keith
- 1955 Keith
- 1956 Kaniva
- 1957 Bordertown
- 1958 Kaniva
- 1959 Mundulla
- 1960 Kaniva
- 1961 Kaniva
- 1962 Keith
- 1963 Kaniva
- 1964 Kaniva
- 1965 Kaniva
- 1966 Leeor
- 1967 Bordertown
- 1968 Bordertown
- 1969 Kaniva
- 1970 Kaniva
- 1971 Bordertown
- 1972 Bordertown
- 1973 Mundulla
- 1974 Leeor
- 1975 Bordertown
- 1976 Bordertown
- 1977 Tintinara
- 1978 Keith
- 1979 Keith
- 1980 Keith
- 1981 Keith
- 1982 Keith
- 1983 Mundulla
- 1984 Bordertown
- 1985 Kaniva
- 1986 Bordertown
- 1987 Bordertown
- 1988 Mundulla
- 1989 Mundulla
- 1990 Bordertown
- 1991 Mundulla
- 1992 Bordertown
