= Mid South Eastern Football League =

Australian rules football league

The Mid South Eastern Football League is an Australian rules football competition based in the Limestone Coast region of South Australia. It is an affiliated member of the South Australian National Football League.

== Clubs ==
=== Current ===
Club	Jumper	Nickname	Home Ground	Former League	Est.	Years in MSEFL	MSEFL Senior Premierships	
Club	Jumper	Nickname	Home Ground	Former League	Est.	Years in MSEFL	Total	Years
Glencoe		Murphies	Glencoe Football Oval, Glencoe	SEFA	1910	1936–	15	1936, 1949, 1953, 1954, 1955, 1957, 1962, 1963, 1966, 1967, 1985, 1991, 1992, 2004, 2007
Hatherleigh		Eagles	Hatherleigh Sport & Recreation Centre, Hatherleigh	–	1946	1947–	8	1971, 2002, 2005, 2008, 2013, 2024, 2025, 2026
Kalangadoo		Magpies	Kalangadoo War Memorial Oval, Kalangadoo	SEFA	1900	1936–	13	1950, 1951, 1952, 1956, 1958, 1982, 1983, 1984, 2001, 2014, 2019, 2022, 2023
Kongorong		Hawks	Kongorong Oval, Kongorong	SE&BFL	1953	1958–	4	1972, 1980, 1981, 1988
Mount Burr (Millicent Central 1936-45)		Mozzies	Mount Burr Football Oval, Mount Burr	–	1936	1936-	22	1937, 1938, 1939, 1959, 1960, 1965, 1969, 1970, 1976, 1977, 1978, 1989, 1990, 1995, 1996, 2000, 2009, 2010, 2011, 2015, 2016, 2017
Nangwarry		Saints	Nangwarry Football Oval, Nangwarry	–	1946	1946–1957, 1965–	4	1993, 1994, 1997, 1999
Port MacDonnell		Demons	Port MacDonnell Football Oval, Port MacDonnell	SE&BFL	1890s	1959-	5	1964, 1979, 1998, 2012, 2021
Robe		Roosters	Robe Oval, Robe	SPFA	1928	1966–	4	1968, 1987, 2003, 2018
Tantanoola		Tigers	Tantanoola Oval, Tantanoola	SEFA	1894	1936–	6	1947, 1948, 1973, 1975, 1986, 2006

=== Locations ===
Locations of the Mid South East FL clubs

=== Previous ===
Club	Jumper	Nickname	Home Ground	Former League	Est.	Years in MSEFL	MSEFL Senior Premierships		Fate
Club	Jumper	Nickname	Home Ground	Former League	Est.	Years in MSEFL	Total	Years	Fate
Beachport		Ports	Beachport Cricket Oval, Beachport	SPFA	1906	1947–1950	0	-	Rejoined Southern Ports FL in 1951
East Gambier		Bulldogs	McDonald Park, Mount Gambier	BLFA	1934	1938–1939	0	-	Transferred to the Mount Gambier and District FA in 1946
Millicent (Millicent Rovers 1936-45)		Rovers	McLaughlin Park, Millicent	–	1936	1936-1946	1	1946	Transferred to the Mount Gambier and District FA in 1947
Penola		Blues	Penola Oval, Penola	SEFA	1865	1937–1939	0	-	Transferred to the Mount Gambier and District FA in 1946
South Gambier		Demons	Mount Gambier Showgrounds, Mount Gambier	SEFA	1926	1938–1939	0	-	Transferred to the Mount Gambier and District FA in 1946
Tarpeena	(?-1999)(2001-03	Kangaroos	Tarpeena Recreation Reserve, Tarpeena	–	1947	1947–1999, 2001–2003	2	1961, 1974	Went 121 games winless between 1993 and 2001. Entered recess in 2000, re-formed in 2001, folded after 2003 season
West Gambier		Roos	Vansittart Park, Mount Gambier	–	1938	1938–1939	0	-	Transferred to the Mount Gambier and District FA in 1946

== Premiers ==
- 1936 GLENCOE FC
- 1937 MILLICENT CENTRALS FC
- 1938 MILLICENT CENTRALS FC
- 1939 MILLICENT CENTRALS FC
- 1940 SEASON ABANDONED
- 1946 MILLICENT FC
- 1947 TANTANOOLA FC
- 1948 TANTANOOLA FC
- 1949 GLENCOE FC
- 1950 KALANGADOO FC
- 1951 KALANGADOO FC
- 1952 KALANGADOO FC
- 1953 GLENCOE FC
- 1954 GLENCOE FC
- 1955 GLENCOE FC
- 1956 KALANGADOO FC
- 1957 GLENCOE FC
- 1958 KALANGADOO FC
- 1959 MOUNT BURR FC
- 1960 MOUNT BURR FC
- 1961 TARPEENA FC
- 1962 GLENCOE FC
- 1963 GLENCOE FC
- 1964 PORT MACDONNELL FC
- 1965 MOUNT BURR FC
- 1966 GLENCOE FC
- 1967 GLENCOE FC
- 1968 ROBE FC
- 1969 MOUNT BURR FC
- 1970 MOUNT BURR FC
- 1971 HATHERLEIGH FC
- 1972 KONGORONG FC
- 1973 TANTANOOLA FC
- 1974 TARPEENA FC
- 1975 TANTANOOLA FC
- 1976 MOUNT BURR FC
- 1977 MOUNT BURR FC
- 1978 MOUNT BURR FC
- 1979 PORT MACDONNELL FC
- 1980 KONGORONG FC
- 1981 KONGORONG FC
- 1982 KALANGADOO FC
- 1983 KALANGADOO FC
- 1984 KALANGADOO FC
- 1985 GLENCOE FC
- 1986 TANTANOOLA FC
- 1987 ROBE FC
- 1988 KONGORONG FC
- 1989 MOUNT BURR FC
- 1990 MOUNT BURR FC
- 1991 GLENCOE FC
- 1992 GLENCOE FC
- 1993 NANGWARRY FC
- 1994 NANGWARRY FC
- 1995 MOUNT BURR FC
- 1996 MOUNT BURR FC
- 1997 NANGWARRY FC
- 1998 PORT MACDONNELL FC
- 1999 NANGWARRY FC
- 2000 MOUNT BURR FC
- 2001 KALANGADOO FC
- 2002 HATHERLEIGH FC
- 2003 ROBE FC
- 2004 GLENCOE FC
- 2005 HATHERLEIGH FC
- 2006 TANTANOOLA FC
- 2007 GLENCOE FC
- 2008 HATHERLEIGH FC
- 2009 MOUNT BURR FC
- 2010 MOUNT BURR FC
- 2011 MOUNT BURR FC
- 2012 PORT MACDONNELL FC
- 2013 HATHERLEIGH FC
- 2014 KALANGADOO FC
- 2015 MOUNT BURR FC
- 2016 MOUNT BURR FC
- 2017 MOUNT BURR FC
- 2018 ROBE FC
- 2019 KALANGADOO FC
- 2020 SEASON ABANDONED
- 2021 PORT MACDONNELL FC
- 2022 KALANGADOO FC
- 2023 KALANGADOO FC
- 2024 HATHERLEIGH FC
- 2025 HATHERLEIGH FC
- 2026 HATHERLEIGH FC

== Brief history ==
The Mid South East Football League formed in 1936 with founding clubs being Glencoe, Kalangadoo, Millicent Centrals (now known as Mount Burr), Millicent Rovers and Tantanoola. Millicent Rovers changed their name to Millicent in 1946, then in 1947 moved to the Mount Gambier & District FL, which later became part of the Western Border Football League.

=== 2006 ===
In 2006 Tantanoola Football Club were premiers, defeating Hatherleigh Football Club.

=== 2007 ===
In 2007 Glencoe Football Club were the premiers beating Tantanoola in the Grand Final. Mt Burr Senior Colts were also Premiers beating Robe in the Final.

=== 2020 ===
In 2020 the season was abandoned because of the COVID-19 pandemic.

== Notable players ==
- Darren Mansell – Tarpeena
- Luke Panozzo, Toby Pink – Tantanoola
- John Seebohm, Ryan Gamble, Brad Agnew, Henry Crauford – Mount Burr
- Jordan Murdoch, Brodie Murdoch – Port MacDonnell
- Jordan Dawson – Robe
- Ben Mules – Kalangadoo
- Warrick McGinty – Kongorong

== Books ==
- Encyclopedia of South Australian country football clubs / compiled by Peter Lines. ISBN 9780980447293
- South Australian country football digest / by Peter Lines ISBN 9780987159199
