= Lake Wallace =

Lake in Australia

- Location in Victoria
- Location: Edenhope, Victoria, Australia
- Coordinates: 37°01′35″S 141°17′36″E
- Type: Freshwater
- Basin countries: Australia
- Settlements: Edenhope

Lake Wallace is a lake in Edenhope, Victoria, Australia, featuring abundant bird life and located on the edge of the township. It is encircled by a 5.5-kilometre (3.4 mi) track suitable for walking, running or bike riding, with plenty of shade and wildlife.

Lake Wallace was named for William Wallace.

Henley Park is located near the southern end of the lake, with a children's playground, shelters containing tables and barbecues, toilets and showers. Henley Park is home to many events, including Henley on Lake Wallace and Day of the Dackel.

The water level in the lake can fluctuate over time, and the lake can dry up completely. During times of high levels it is used for swimming, fishing and boating activities.

In 1866, Australian cricketer Tom Wills trained a team of Aboriginal people on the lake's banks. The team played throughout Victoria and New South Wales, and several members formed the Aboriginal team which toured England in 1868.
