= Max Galpin =

Australian rules footballer

Personal information
- Full name: Max Galpin
- Born: 27 July 1935
- Died: 18 August 2015 (aged 80); Torquay
- Original team: Edenhope
- Height: 183 cm (6 ft 0 in)
- Weight: 78 kg (172 lb)

Playing career^{1}
Years	Club	Games (Goals)
1956	Fitzroy	4 (0)
- ^{1} Playing statistics correct to the end of 1956.

Max Galpin (27 July 1935 – 18 August 2015) was an Australian rules footballer who played with Fitzroy in the Victorian Football League (VFL).
