= Bruce Greenhill =

Australian rules footballer

Personal information
- Full name: Bruce Greenhill
- Born: 26 July 1946
- Died: 6 February 2014 (aged 67)
- Original team: Essendon Reserves / Edenhope
- Height: 192 cm (6 ft 4 in)
- Weight: 84 kg (185 lb)

Playing career^{1}
Years	Club	Games (Goals)
1969	Footscray	1 (0)
- ^{1} Playing statistics correct to the end of 1969.

Bruce Greenhill (26 July 1946 – 6 February 2014) was a former Australian rules footballer who played with Footscray in the Victorian Football League (VFL). Greenhill became an established footballer in the Tasmanian Football League with Sandy Bay and Hobart during the 1970s and early 1980s, playing in numerous premierships with both clubs before retiring as a player following the 1981 season and becoming senior coach of Hobart Football Club in 1982 and 1983. Following his retirement as coach, Greenhill became a radio and television commentator for ABC-Television and Radio's TFL match broadcasts which he did until the end of the 1997 season. Greenhill later became head of AFL Tasmania for a brief time in the late 1990s before retiring to Queensland in the early 2000s where he remained until he died from brain cancer in 2014.
