= Murrie Batt =

Australian rules footballer

Personal information
- Full name: Murrie Alexander Batt
- Born: 6 October 1953 (age 73)
- Original team: Apsley
- Height: 193 cm (6 ft 4 in)
- Weight: 94 kg (207 lb)

Playing career^{1}
Years	Club	Games (Goals)
1975–78	Collingwood	12 (14)
1979–80	Preston (VFA)	25 (51)
- ^{1} Playing statistics correct to the end of 1980.

Murrie Alexander Batt (born 6 October 1953) is a former Australian rules footballer who played with Collingwood in the Victorian Football League (VFL).
