= Tom Hutchesson =

Australian rules footballer

Personal information
- Born: 4 April 1995 (age 31); Millicent, South Australia
- Draft: No. 65, 2019 AFL draft, Greater Western Sydney
- Debut: 13 August 2020, Greater Western Sydney vs. Sydney, at Perth Stadium
- Height: 178 cm (5 ft 10 in)
- Weight: 75 kg (165 lb)
- Position: Forward

Playing career^{1}
| Years | Club | Games (Goals) |
| 2020–2021 | Greater Western Sydney | 1 (0) |
- ^{1} Playing statistics correct to the end of 2020.

Tom Hutchesson (born 11 July 2000) is an Australian rules footballer who played for the Greater Western Sydney Giants in the Australian Football League (AFL). He was recruited by the Greater Western Sydney Giants with the 65th draft pick in the 2019 AFL draft.

== Early football ==
Tom Hutchesson played local football for the Millicent Football Club in the Western Border Football League. He helped the club win their first senior premiership in 34 years. In 2019, Hutchesson was invited to play for the Adelaide Crows in the South Australian National Football League (SANFL). He played 14 games and kicked 3 goals, and averaged 14 disposals a game.

== AFL career ==
Hutchesson debuted in the Greater Western Sydney's 41 point loss to Sydney in the 12th round of the 2020 AFL season. On debut, Hutchesson kicked one behind, collected 7 disposals, 2 marks and a tackle. Hutchesson was delisted at the conclusion of the 2021 season.

== Statistics ==
Statistics are correct to the end of 2020

Legend
| G | Goals | K | Kicks | D | Disposals | T | Tackles |
| B | Behinds | H | Handballs | M | Marks |

| Season | Team | No. | Games | Totals | | | | | | | Averages (per game) | | | | | | |
| Season | Team | No. | Games | G | B | K | H | D | M | T | G | B | K | H | D | M | T |
|---|---|---|---|---|---|---|---|---|---|---|---|---|---|---|---|---|---|
| 2020 (Note: The 2020 season was played with 17 home-and-away matches per team (down from 22) and 16-minute quarters with time on (down from 20-minute quarters with time on) due to the impact of the COVID-19 pandemic.) | Greater Western Sydney | 20 | 1 | 0 | 1 | 4 | 3 | 7 | 2 | 1 | 0.0 | 1.0 | 4.0 | 3.0 | 7.0 | 2.0 | 1.0 |
| Career | | | 1 | 0 | 1 | 4 | 3 | 7 | 2 | 1 | 0.0 | 1.0 | 4.0 | 3.0 | 7.0 | 2.0 | 1.0 |
