= Joanna, South Australia =

Joanna South Australia
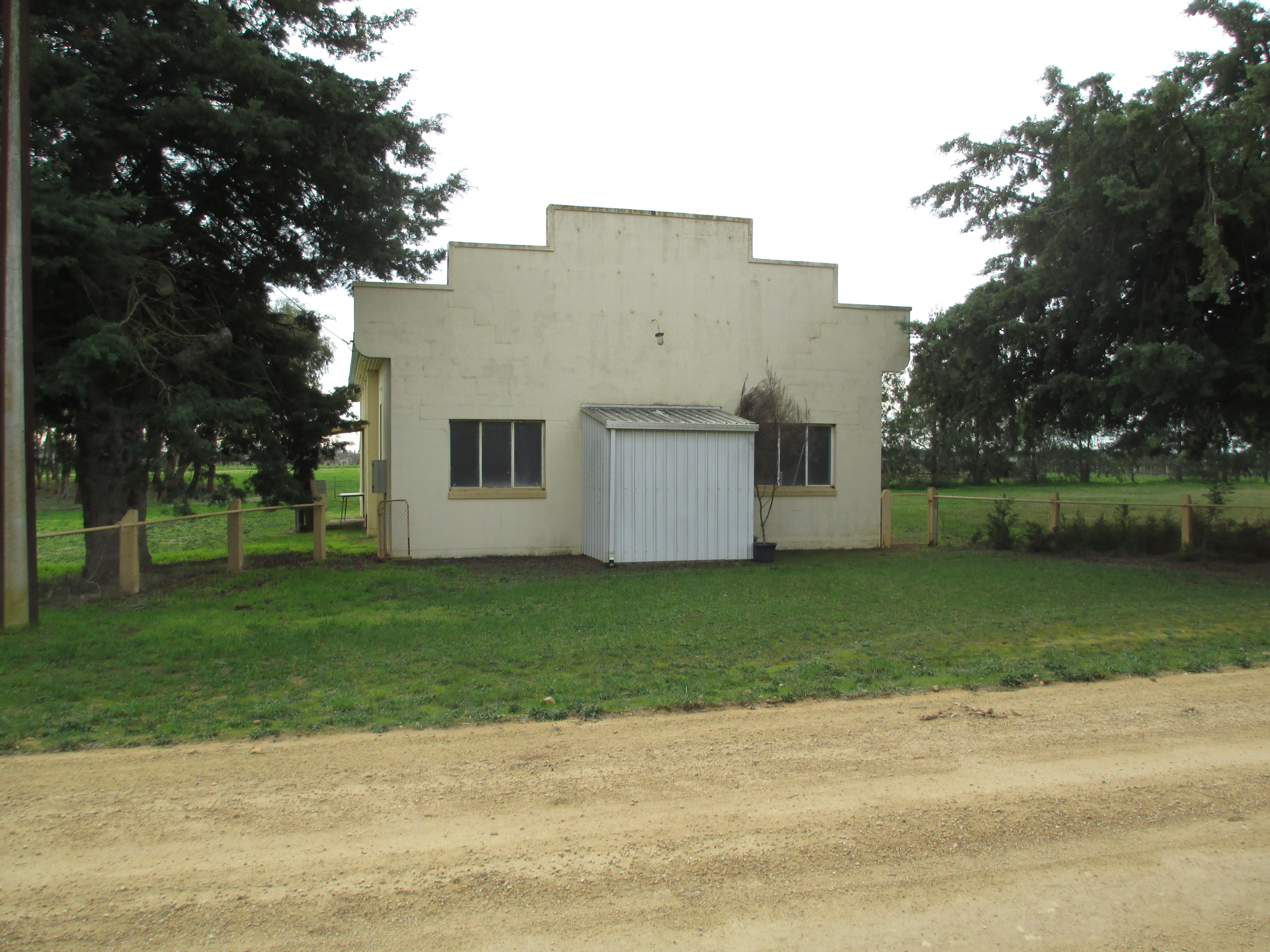
- Hall at Joanna, July 2016

- Coordinates: 37°7′14″S 140°51′59″E
- Population: 106 (SAL 2021)
- Established: 12 April 2001
- Postcode(s): 5271
- Time zone: ACST (UTC+9:30)
  - Summer (DST): ACST (UTC+10:30)
- LGA(s): Naracoorte Lucindale Council
- Region: Limestone Coast
- County: Robe
- State electorate(s): MacKillop
- Federal division(s): Barker
Mean max temp	Mean min temp	Annual rainfall
20.7 °C; 69 °F	8.0 °C; 46 °F	548.5 mm 21.6 in
Localities around Joanna:
Mount Light	Mount Light	Koppamurra
Struan	Joanna	Koppamurra; Langkoop; Wrattonbully
Glenroy	Glenroy	Wrattonbully
- Footnotes: Coordinates; Locations; Climatic data Adjoining localities

Joanna is a locality in the Australian state of South Australia located in the state's south-east within the state’s Limestone Coast region about 325 kilometres (202 miles) south east of the state capital of Adelaide, about 19.5 kilometres (12.1 miles) south-east of the municipal seat of Naracoorte.

Joanna started as a private subdivision. Boundaries were created in April 2001 for the “long established name” which is derived from the cadastral unit of the Hundred of Joanna which was named in 1862 after the daughter of Dominick Daly, the then Governor of South Australia.

The majority land use within the locality is primary production. The locality includes land proclaimed for conservation purposes as the Naracoorte Caves National Park.

The full extent of the national park was listed on 17 May 2017 as a state heritage place on the South Australian Heritage Register with the name of the Naracoorte Caves Complex.

Joanna shares a single CFS brigade with the neighbouring locality of Wrattonbully.

Joanna is located within the federal Division of Barker, the state electoral district of MacKillop, and the local government area of the Naracoorte Lucindale Council.
