= Blanche Cave =

Cave in South Australia

Coordinates: 37°02′00″S 140°47′50″E

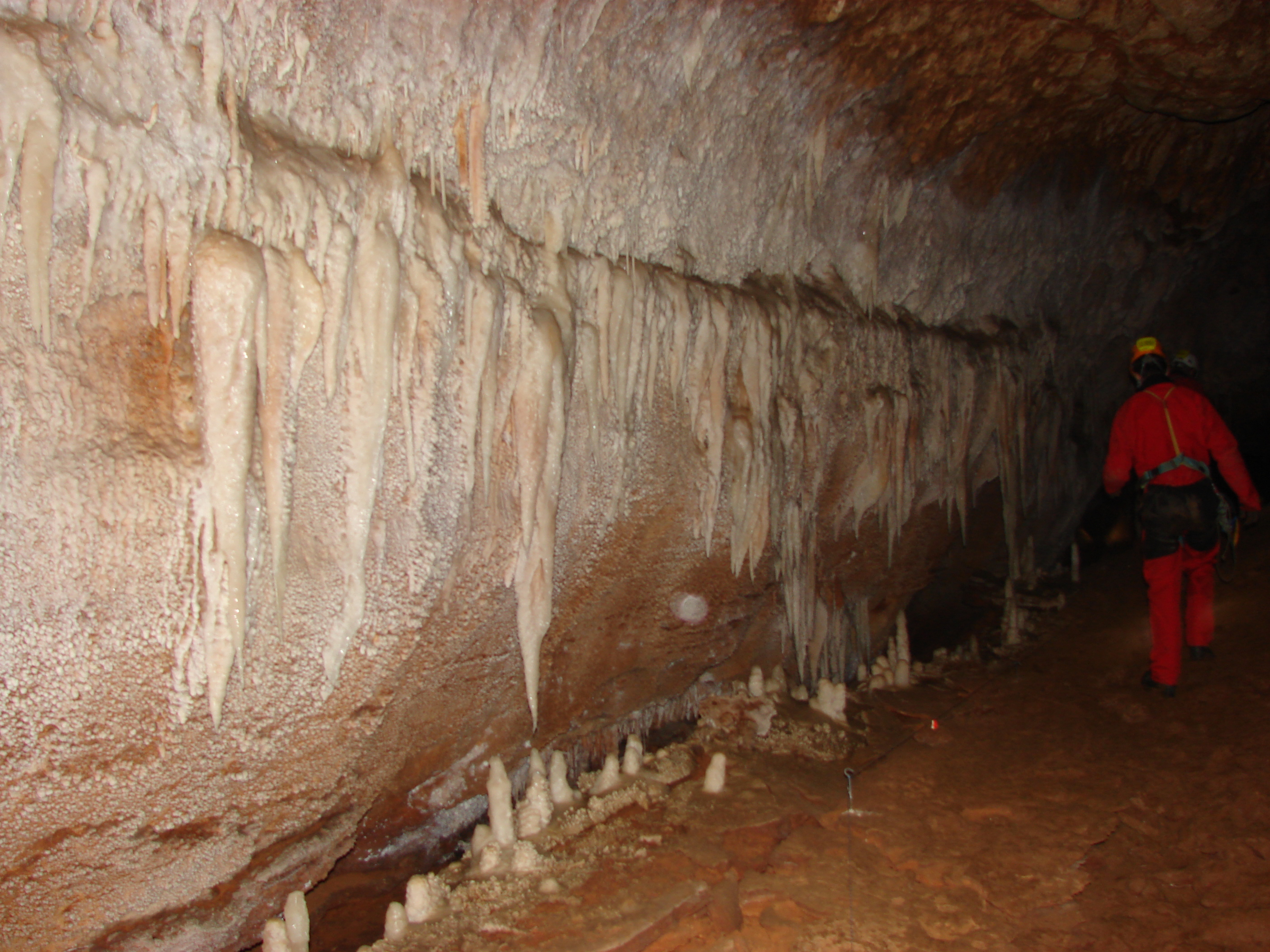

- Location within South Australia
- Location: Naracoorte Caves National Park; Joanna, South Australia
- Length: 250 metres
- Entrances: 3

Blanche Cave, previously known as "The Big Cave", "The Old Cave" and "Mosquito Plains Cave", is one of 26 caves to be found in the Naracoorte Caves National Park, a World Heritage listed site. Blanche Cave was the first of the caves to be discovered in the Naracoorte area, having been found by European settlers in 1845, and can be accessed by the public through guided tours of the site. The cave contains a number of features, including, at one time, the mummified remains of an indigenous man – remains that were stolen twice in 1861 and never returned. The location has been the site for a number of events, such as, in the early days, annual New Year's parties and, much more recently, it was featured as part of the Olympic torch relay for the 2000 Summer Olympics in Sydney. Blanche Cave, along with the nearby Victoria Fossil Cave, was added to the South Australian Heritage Register in 1984.

== History ==
=== European discovery ===
Blanche Cave was discovered by European settlers in approximately 1845 by the local pastoralists – Benjamin Sanders, a local station manager, is surmised to be the first European to see the cave when he found sheep that had gone missing within it, presumably having been driven there by the members of the indigenous population. The first detailed recording of the cave occurred 13 years later in March, 1858, when Reverend Julian Woods wrote about his experiences at the site in the South Australian Register. He described the entrance of the cave in poetical terms, comparing it to a cathedral.

The observer finds himself at the entrance of a large oblong square chamber, low, but perfectly lighted by an aperture at the opposite end, and all around, above and below, the eye is bewildered by a profusion of ornaments and decoration of Nature's own devising. It is like an immense Gothic cathedral, and the numbers of half-finished stalagmites which rise from the ground like kneeling or prostrate forms, seem worshipers in that silent and solemn place. The walls are pretty equal in outline, generally unbroken nearly to the floor, and then for the most part they shelve in as far as the eye can reach, leaving a wedge-shaped aperture nearly all round. This seems devised by Nature to add to the embellishment of the place, for in the space thus left droppings of limestone have formed the most fanciful tracery, where pillars of every shape wind into small groups like garlands of flowers, or stand out like the portico of a Grecian temple, the supports becoming smaller and smaller, till they join, like a mass of carved marble.

— Julian Woods, 1858

After its discovery, access to the cave remained unrestricted, and this led to a degree of deterioration, especially in the entrance chamber. 21 years after Woods described the scene, an unnamed journalist visited the cave. He had previously read Woods' account, and described how the site had deteriorated through human action.

I looked, however, in vain for the many traces of beauty which Mr Woods describes. They are all going or gone. The floor is strewed with fragments of bottles and sardine tins. The smoke from tourists' fires has begrimed the walls. The graceful pillars formed by the meeting of stalactites with stalagmites have been knocked down for fun. The pendant decorations of the roof have been used as targets for after dinner sport with stones and sticks. One beautiful column, rising in some fantastic resemblance to a human figure, has been selected as the favourite place on which to place empty bottles "for a cockshy." Names have been carved, or scratched, or daubed on every part of the wall within reach. Brown, Jones and Robinson have sought monumental immortality by defiling and defacing the lovely rock forms of the place. And some of these visitors, too lazy to cut their names, have written them in extravagant size with the smoking flame of their candle, a mode of disfigurement especially to be seen in the inner chambers.

— Unnamed South Australian correspondent, 1879

The correspondent continued his account by requesting that a guardian should be appointed by the Government or Tourist Board. Indeed, as the correspondent noted, this was likely to occur, and in 1885 the land incorporating Blanche Cave was given over to the South Australian Forest Board as part of a program to plant marketable trees in the region. The Board employed a forester for the area, and the forester was given the additional responsibilities of looking after Blanche Cave, improving its appearance, and providing guided tours of the site. While the first forester only stayed for 18 months, the second, William Reddan, was to remain involved in the site for many years. Reddan did much to "beautify" the surroundings of the cave, growing ferns and ornamental trees, and he was involved in the installation of coloured electric lights in 1915. That same year responsibility for the caves was handed over to the Tourist Bureau, and Reddan resigned from the Woods and Forest Department (as it was then known) to take up a position with the new management. Reddan remained associated with the site until he retired in 1919.

The cave has long been employed as a venue for special events – as far back as the 1860s the cave was being used for candlelit New Year's Eve parties, and the remains of the old benches can still be seen near the entrance. More recently, the site saw the passage and handover of the Olympic Torch in the torch relay for the 2000 Summer Olympics in Sydney, during which the cave was lit by over 1000 candles, while other recent events have included a 2003 production of Shakespeare's A Midsummer Night's Dream.

Blanche Cave, along with the nearby Victoria Fossil Cave, was added as a single listing to the South Australian Heritage Register in 1984.

=== Calcified body ===
Not long after the cave was discovered, early explorers found the body of an indigenous man within. Although his origins are unclear, it was believed that he had entered the cave after becoming injured, making his way to a rock ledge where he died, "in the position of one asleep". Woods related one theory of how he arrived at that position, describing how a group of settlers formed a party to avenge the death of the sheep and the killing of one of their number. The party shot many of the indigenous people living in the region, one of whom, Woods surmises, was fatally wounded but managed to make his way into the cave to hide, and, sadly, to die. Variations of this account described how the man was shot near Hynam, or placed his shooting much nearer to the cave itself. However, this account of his death fails to address the state of the body: Woods described it as being "dried and shriveled", only slightly decayed, and stated that it had been there for many years without decomposition. In addition, the man appears to have died under an active flowstone, which caused parts of his body to become covered in limestone, leading Woods to describe him as being in an "almost petrified" state. It is suggested that both processes would take many years, placing his death some time prior to 1845.

Woods included the body in his account of the cave that was published in 1858. Three years later, in 1861, the body was stolen from the cave by Thomas Craig, a showman known for exhibiting "stuffed crocodiles". He carried the body in a bundle from Penola to Mount Gambier, where he rented a room. However, one of the maids inspected the bundle, which he had described as carrying a harp, and discovered the remains. After the police seized the body, Craig reappeared, and chose to sue the Government of South Australia for depriving him of his property. The resulting court case was heard in Adelaide, and in the end Craig was granted one farthing in damages, instead of the 500 pounds which he had requested.

The Commissioner of Crown Lands ordered that the remains be returned to the cave, only this time to be protected by iron bars, in spite of a call to have them moved to the Adelaide Museum. The suggestion that the remains needed to be housed in a museum for their protection proved to be prophetic, as Craig hid in the cave while the bars were being attached. After the workmen had departed, Craig removed the bars and stole the body once more. The remains were later described as being on display by Craig in Sydney, (along with the stuffed crocodiles). From there they were next reported as having been sold at an auction in London in 1866, but it is unclear as to where his body went after that, in spite of unsubstantiated rumours that the remains were sighted in America around 1914.

Subsequent to its disappearance, the site where the body had been found and the bars attached became known as the "Lost Exhibit".

== Description ==
The cave consists of three chambers. The entrance chamber, located at the south-eastern end of the site, contains the old wooden tables and benches. The second, or middle, chamber has two "windows" – holes in the roof that permit light to enter the space – located at either end of the chamber, and which provide two of the three possible entrances to the cave. This area also contains a number of dry columns. The third chamber is also the largest, and is where the "Lost Exhibit" is located. It contains the remains of a bat guano quarry, (the "Devil's Pit"), and a structure known as the "Post Office".

The deterioration that had been noted in 1879 has been, to some extent, reversed. Even at the time, the correspondent noted that "the restorative action of nature is very rapid", and that the scars were being healed. However, the planting of pine trees prevented water from percolating through the cave, limiting its restoration and, indeed, causing further deterioration of the decorations. The removal of these trees in the late 1980s have permitted rejuvenation to continue.
