= Laurie Park, South Australia =

Laurie Park South Australia
- Coordinates: 36°58′49″S 140°53′57″E
- Established: 12 April 2001
- Postcode(s): 5271
- Time zone: ACST (UTC+9:30)
  - Summer (DST): ACST (UTC+10:30)
- LGA(s): Naracoorte Lucindale Council
- Region: Limestone Coast
- County: Robe
- State electorate(s): MacKillop
- Federal division(s): Barker
Mean max temp	Mean min temp	Annual rainfall
20.7 °C; 69 °F	8.0 °C; 46 °F	548.5 mm 21.6 in
Localities around Laurie Park:
Hynam	Hynam	Apsley, Victoria
Hynam; Koppamurra	Laurie Park	Apsley, Victoria
Koppamurra	Koppamurra	Langkoop, Victoria
- Footnotes: Adjoining localities

Laurie Park is a locality located within the Naracoorte Lucindale Council in the Limestone Coast region of South Australia.

Boundaries for the locality were created on 12 April 2001. Its boundaries include the southern part of the site of the ceased Government Town of Jessie.

Laurie Park is located within the federal division of Barker, the state electoral district of MacKillop and the local government area of the Naracoorte Lucindale Council.
