= Naracoorte Lucindale Council =

Coordinates: 36°57′22″S 140°44′29″E

- Local government area
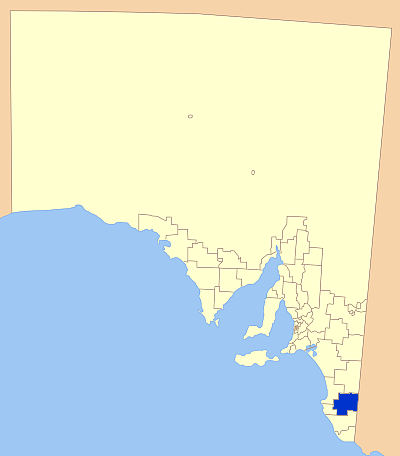
- Position of the Naracoorte Lucindale Council in blue

- Interactive map of Naracoorte Lucindale Council
- Country: Australia
- State: South Australia
- Region: Limestone Coast
- Established: 1998
- Council seat: Naracoorte

Government
  - Mayor: Patrick Ross (from November 2022)
  - State electorate: MacKillop
  - Federal division: Barker

Area
  - Total: 4,516.7 km^{2} (1,743.9 sq mi)

Population
  - Total: 8,686 (LGA 2021)
  - Density: 1.92/km^{2} (5.0/sq mi)
- Website: Naracoorte Lucindale Council
LGAs around Naracoorte Lucindale Council
Kingston District Council	Tatiara District Council
	Naracoorte Lucindale Council	West Wimmera (Vic)
District Council of Robe	Wattle Range Council

The Naracoorte Lucindale Council is a local government area in the Australian state of South Australia located in the Limestone Coast region in the south-east of the state adjacent to the Victorian border.

It was created on 1 December 1998 following the amalgamation of the District Council of Naracoorte and the District Council of Lucindale.

The districts economy is agricultural based, with cereal crops, sheep and beef predominantly farmed. It has a substantial tourist industry as well, with the Naracoorte Caves, Wonambi Fossil Centre and the seasonal Bool and Hacks Lagoons Wetlands being the main attractions.

== Geography ==
The council encompasses the major towns of Naracoorte and Lucindale, as well as the smaller towns and localities of Binnum, Cadgee, Coles, Conmurra, Fox, Frances, Hynam, Joanna, Keppoch, Koppamurra, Kybybolite, Laurie Park, Lochaber, Mount Light, Moyhall, Spence, Stewart Range, Struan, The Gap, Wild Dog Valley, Woolumbool and Wrattonbully, and parts of Avenue Range, Bool Lagoon and Clay Wells.

== Facilities ==
The towns of Naracoorte and Lucindale collectively have all major facilities expected by visitors to the area, including supermarkets, speciality stores, restaurants and accommodation in a range of forms.

The district has a number of education and health facilities, with Naracoorte having a high school and 3 primary schools, a hospital, the Naracoorte Swimming Lake and Lucindale a public library and Area School.

The area also has a number of sporting clubs.

== Councillors ==
Ward	Councillor	Notes
Mayor	Patrick Ross	
Unsubdivided	Tom Dennis	
Unsubdivided	Cameron Grundy	
Unsubdivided	Craig McGuire	
Unsubdivided	Monique Crossling	
Unsubdivided	Abigail Goodman	
Unsubdivided	Trevor Rayner	
Unsubdivided	Darren Turner	
Unsubdivided	Damien Ross	
Unsubdivided	Peter Ireland	
Unsubdivided	Andrew Downward	

Naracoorte Lucindale Council has a directly-elected mayor.

== See also ==
- List of parks and gardens in rural South Australia
