= Glenroy, South Australia =

Glenroy South Australia
- Coordinates: 37.251906738183976°S 140.79642299907948°E
- Population: 76 (SAL 2021)
- Postcode(s): 5277
- Elevation: 63 m (207 ft)
- Location: 374 km (232 mi) southeast of Adelaide, South Australia
- LGA(s): Wattle Range Council
Localities around Glenroy:
Bool Lagoon	Struan, Joanna	Wrattonbully
Maaoupe	Glenroy	Comaum
Maaoupe	Coonawarra	Coonawarra

Glenroy is a locality in the Australian state of South Australia located in the state's southeast about 374 kilometres southeast of the state capital of Adelaide in the Wattle Range Council.

Glenroy is located on the railway line between Wolseley and Mount Gambier, South Australia. It has been closed to traffic since April 1995.

The Glen Roy Conservation Park is located in Glenroy.

Glenroy and its railway station were named after a town of a similar name in Scotland.

In the 2021 census, the population of Glenroy was 76.
