= Hynam, South Australia =

Hynam South Australia
- Coordinates: 36°56′28″S 140°51′17″E
- Population: 198 (SAL 2021)
- Established: 10 June 1909 (town); 12 April 2001 (locality)
- Postcode(s): 5262
- Elevation: 78 m (256 ft)(railway station)
- Time zone: ACST (UTC+9:30)
  - Summer (DST): ACST (UTC+10:30)
- Location: 302 km (188 mi) SE of Adelaide; 11 km (7 mi) E of Naracoorte
- LGA(s): Naracoorte Lucindale Council
- Region: Limestone Coast
- County: Robe
- State electorate(s): MacKillop
- Federal division(s): Barker
Mean max temp	Mean min temp	Annual rainfall
21.7 °C; 71 °F	8.1 °C; 47 °F	490.5 mm 19.3 in
Localities around Hynam:
Wild Dog Valley	Kybybolite	Apsley, Victoria
Wild Dog Valley; Naracoorte; Mount Light	Hynam	Apsley, Victoria
Mount Light	Koppamurra; Laurie Park	Apsley, Victoria; Laurie Park
- Footnotes: Locations; Adjoining localities

Hynam (formerly Hynam East) is a town and locality in the Australian state of South Australia located in the state's south-east within the Limestone Coast region on the border with the state of Victoria about 302 kilometres (188 miles) south east of the state capital of Adelaide and about 11 kilometres (6.8 miles) east of the municipal seat of Naracoorte.

Hynam began as a government town proclaimed as Hynam East on 10 June 1909. It is located adjacent to the Hynam Railway Station and consisted of two parts which were respectively placed on the north and south sides of the railway line. Its name was 'altered' to 'Hynam' on 20 February 1941. Boundaries for the locality of Hynam were created on 12 April 2001. Its boundaries include the Government Town of Hynam and northern part of the site of the ceased Government Town of Jessie.

Hynam was on the Mount Gambier railway line between Wolseley and Mount Gambier, South Australia which closed on 12 April 1995.

Hynam is located within the federal division of Barker, the state electoral district of MacKillop and the local government area of the Naracoorte Lucindale Council.
