= Jessie, South Australia =

Jessie
- Town
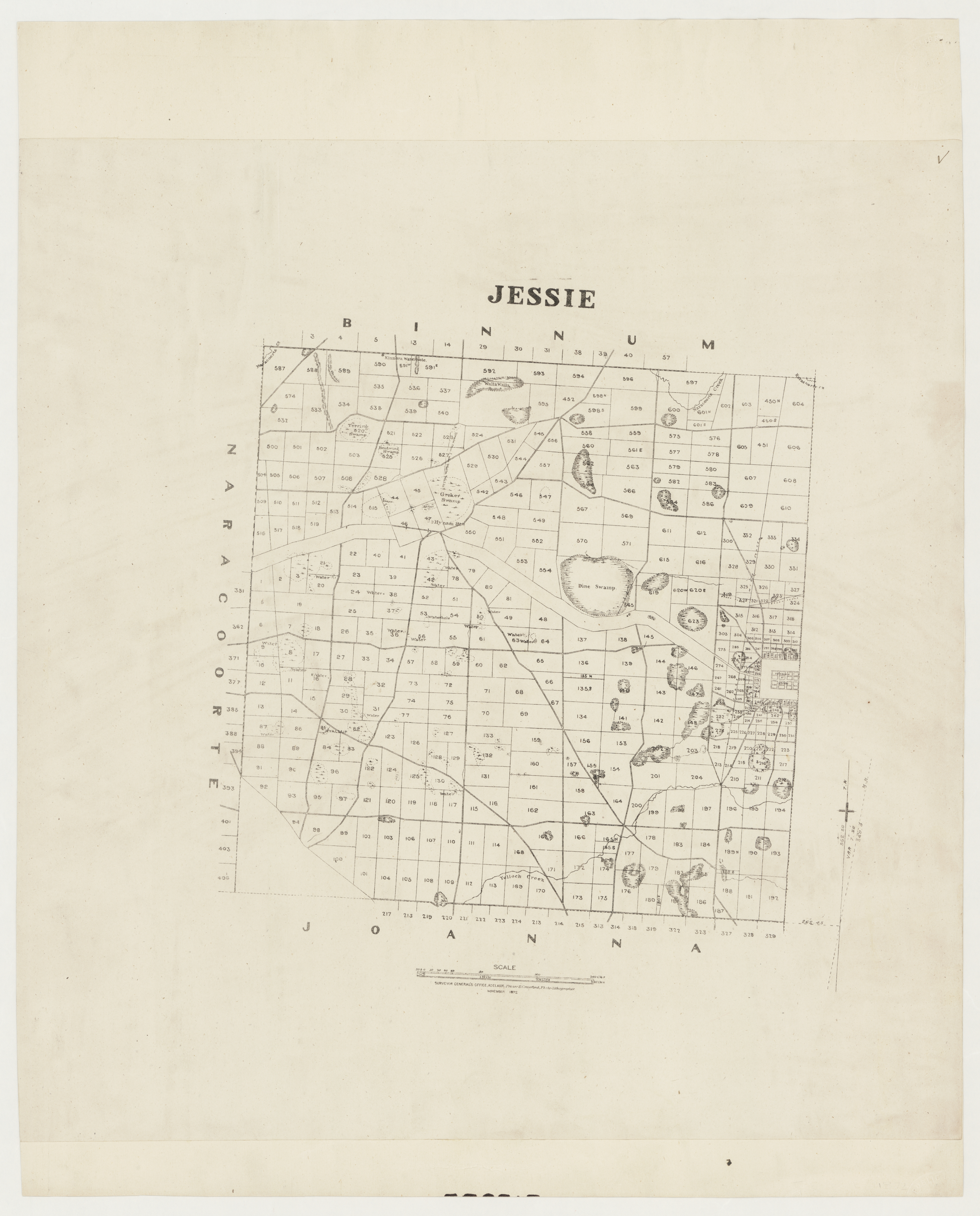
- Drawing of the Hundred of Jessie, circa 1872, showing the proposed location and layout of the Town of Jessie

- Coordinates: 36°58′18″S 140°57′56″E
- Country: Australia
- State: South Australia
- LGA(s): District Council of Naracoorte
- Location: 311 km (193 mi) SE of Adelaide; 20 km (12 mi) E of Naracoorte
- Established: by 1870
- Abolished: 24 January 1929

Area
  - Total: 100 ha (250 acres)
- County: Robe

Jessie was a town in the Australian state of South Australia whose site is located about 311 kilometres (193 mi) south-east of the state capital of Adelaide and about 20 kilometres (12 mi) east of the former municipal seat of Naracoorte at the border with the state of Victoria.

It was in the cadastral unit of the Hundred of Jessie on land with an estimated area of 100 hectares (250 acres). Upon the proclamation of the District Councils Act 1887 on 9 December 1887, it was located within the jurisdiction of the District Council of Narracoorte.

The source of the town’s name is not reported in official sources. An article in The Narracoorte Herald of 22 February 1929 does offer two possible opinions to the sources of the town’s name. The first was that "many South-Eastern people thought it was named after a sister of the late Mr. J. P. D. Laurie" who may have had "some influence with the Crown Lands Department" in respect to its name. The second was that it was named after "some other lady" on the basis of the views of "some other historians of nomenclature." This lady could be Lady Jessie Blyth for whom the Hundred of Jessie was named. Lady Blyth was the wife of Sir Arthur Blyth, Commissioner of Crown Land and a former Premier of South Australia when the Hundred was proclaimed on 24 October 1867.

Jessie is reported as being proclaimed on 28 April 1876 by one source while official sources such as the South Australian Government Gazette contain no mention of any proclamation. However, the government gazette does show that land within the town was available for purchase by November 1870 at the latest. A drawing of the Hundred of Jessie prepared in November 1872 by the surveyor-general’s office shows that the town had been located and that a layout of its allotments and streets had been prepared. The town is reported as being surveyed during May 1890. In September 1891, during the second reading of The Park Lands Resumption Bill in the South Australian House of Assembly, it was stated that the town allotments in the Town of Jessie all remained unsold and that there were "no occupants on town lots" while the "suburban lands" had been "nearly all sold."

On 24 January 1929, the town was declared by a proclamation under the Crown Lands Act 1915 to "ceased to exist" along with the closure of all roads within its boundaries.

On 12 April 2001, the site of the ceased town was divided along the alignment of the Wimmera Highway with its north and south sides being allocated respectively to the newly created localities of Hynam and Laurie Park.
