= Victoria Cave =

Victoria Cave may refer to:

- A cave near Settle, North Yorkshire
- Victoria Fossil Cave in the Naracoorte Caves National Park, Australia
- Cueva Victoria, a cave in Cartagena, Spain
