= Mount Light =

Mount Light may refer to:

- Mount Light (Antarctica), mountain in Antarctica
- Mount Light, South Australia, locality in Australia
