= Kybybolite =

- Town
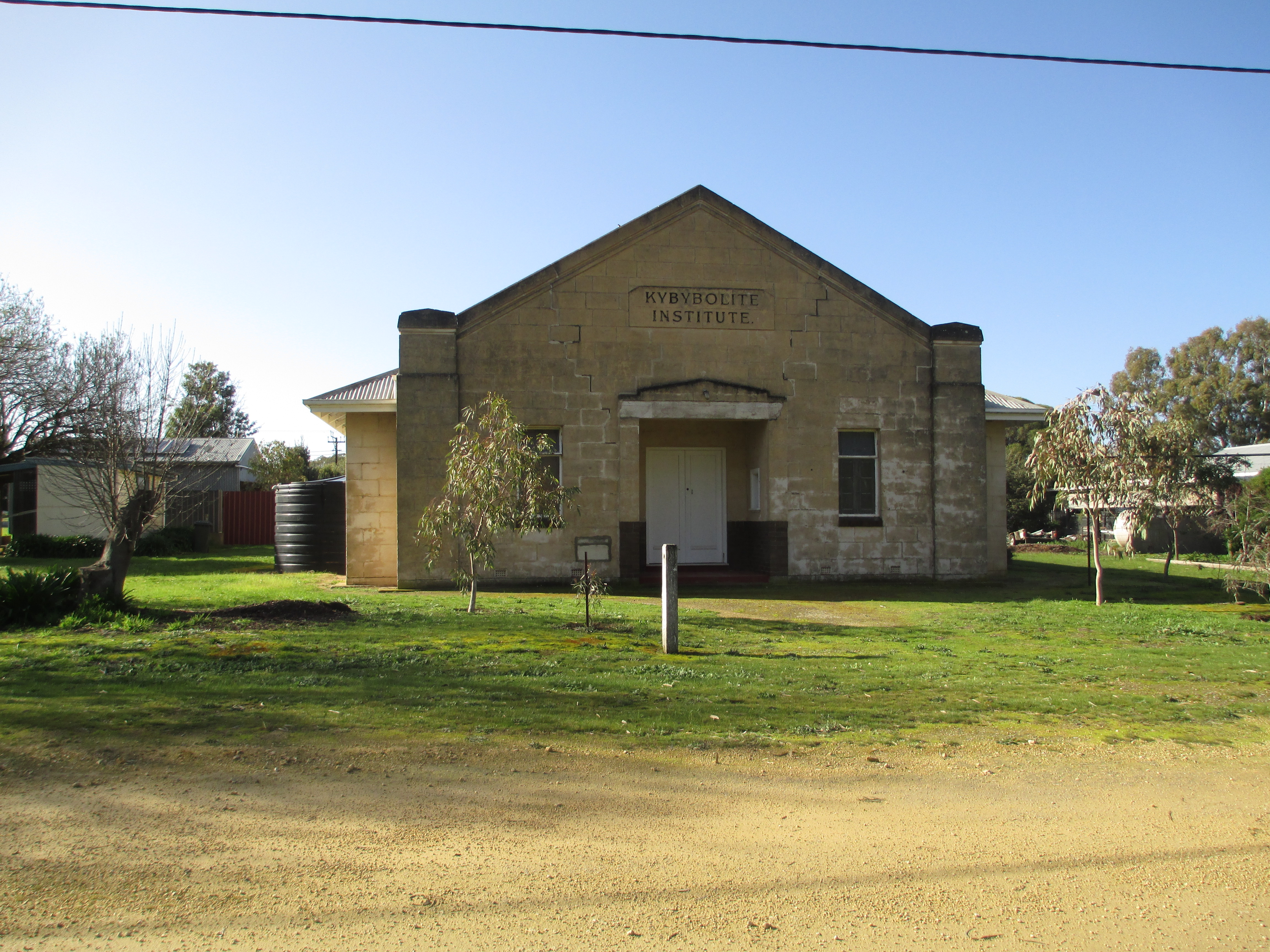
- Kybybolite institute building

- Coordinates: 36°52′08″S 140°55′34″E
- Country: Australia
- State: South Australia
- Region: Limestone Coast
- LGA: Naracoorte Lucindale Council
- Location: 301 km (187 mi) SE of Adelaide; 19 km (12 mi) NE of Naracoorte; 108 km (67 mi) N of Mount Gambier
- Established: 31 August 1905 (town); 12 April 2001 (locality)

Government
  - State electorate: MacKillop
  - Federal division: Barker

Population
  - Total: 102 (SAL 2021)
- Time zone: UTC+9:30 (ACST)
  - Summer (DST): UTC+10:30 (ACST)
- Postcode: 5262
- County: MacDonnell
- Mean max temp: 21.6 °C (70.9 °F)
- Mean min temp: 8.1 °C (46.6 °F)
- Annual rainfall: 484 mm (19.1 in)
Localities around Kybybolite
	Binnum	Benayeo
Wild Dog Valley	Kybybolite
Naracoorte	Hynam	Apsley
- Location; Adjoining localities

Kybybolite, also known by the local abbreviation "Kyby" (/ˈkaɪbi/), is a locality in the Australian state of South Australia located in the state's south-east within the Limestone Coast region on the border with the state of Victoria about 301 kilometres (187 miles) south east of the state capital of Adelaide and about 19 kilometres (12 miles) north-east of the municipal seat of Naracoorte.

The state government established a research farm at Kybybolite in 1905. This has included orchards, poultry, pigs, dairy and beef cattle, sheep, pasture, hay and silage production. The historic Kybybolite house on the farm is listed on the South Australian Heritage Register.

The railway closed on 12 April 1995 with the last train from Mount Gambier to Keswick passing through that Wednesday afternoon. The school operated from 1907 to 1998, teaching a total of 854 students. The school library was dedicated to Jim Paroissien, who had been head teacher from 1930 to 1940, but was killed in action in World War 2 over Malta.

The principal land use in the locality outside Kybybolite township itself is primary production. The portion of the Mullinger Swamp located within the locality in South Australia has protected area status as the Mullinger Swamp Conservation Park.

On 4 August 2016, a sinkhole approximately 2 m (6 ft 7 in) in diameter and 2 m (6 ft 7 in) deep opened unexpectedly on the property of local farmer, Andrew Shepherd.

Kybybolite is located within the federal Division of Barker, the state electoral district of MacKillop, and the local government area of the Naracoorte Lucindale Council.

2020, 2023 Brownlow Medallist and 2024 Gary Ayres Award Premiership Captain Lachie Neale grew up and played his junior football in Kybybolite.
