= Mullinger Swamp Conservation Park =

Protected area in South Australia

- IUCN category IV (habitat/species management area)
- Location within South Australia
- Location: South Australia
- Nearest city: Kybybolite
- Coordinates: 36°51′13″S 140°58′07″E
- Area: 13 ha (32 acres)
- Established: 15 January 1976
- Visitors: not stated (refer below) (in 1992)
- Governing body: Department for Environment and Water

Mullinger Swamp Conservation Park is a protected area in the Australian state of South Australia located in the state's south-east in the gazetted locality of Kybybolite on the border with the state of Victoria about 25 kilometres (16 mi) north-east of Naracoorte.

The conservation park occupies land in section 681 of the cadastral unit of the Hundred of Binnum which was proclaimed on 15 January 1976 under the National Parks and Wildlife Act 1972. Prior to proclamation, the land was “vacant Crown Land” which may have been used for grazing. As of July 2016, the conservation park covered an area of 13 hectares (32 acres).

The conservation park occupies about 35% of the extent of the Mullinger Swamp with the remainder being located in Victoria and which received protected area status as the Mullinger Swamp Wildlife Reserve in 1983.

In 1992, the conservation park was described as having soils that were “alkaline, poorly drained, deep, grey, self-mulching, cracking clay” while the land surrounding the swamp had “alkaline. imperfectly drained, hard, apedal. mottled-yellow, duplex soils”. The latter supported “a river red gum open forest with a disturbed understorey of wallaby grass (Danthonia sp.), introduced grasses and pasture weeds such as Cape weed (Arctotheca calendula)”.

As of 1992, the conservation park was used by “local and district residents” for “picnics, fishing and swimming” and “on occasions by field naturalists and birdwatchers”. However, its attraction as a swimming site has declined due to the establishment of a swimming lake in Naracoorte.

The conservation park is classified as an IUCN Category IV protected area. In 1980, it was listed on the now-defunct Register of the National Estate.

== See also ==
- Protected areas of South Australia
