= Louisa O'Brien =

Australian hotelier (1880–1957)

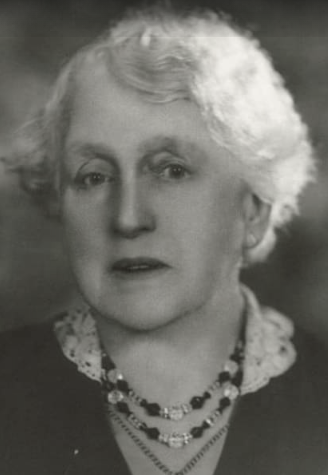
- Louisa O'Brien
- Born: Louisa Read; 1 September 1880; Naracoorte, South Australia
- Died: 16 December 1957 (aged 77); Adelaide
- Occupation: hotelier
- Known for: running leading hotels
- Spouse: John O'Brien
- Children: 5

Louisa O'Brien MBE born Louisa Read (1 September 1880 – 16 December 1957) was an Australian hotelier. She controlled a number of hotels but her favourite was the South Australia Hotel in Adelaide which she revived into one of the best hotels "in the empire".

== Life ==
O'Brien was born in 1880 in Naracoorte, South Australia. Her parents Mary Hannah (born Chaston) and George Henry Read ran hotels and her father also trained racehorses. As a child she was in Melbourne until in 1890 the family came back to Adelaide where she went to the Hardwicke Girls College. Her parents managed the Black Bull Inn. It was said to be the city's first hotel and it had taken that name in 1841.

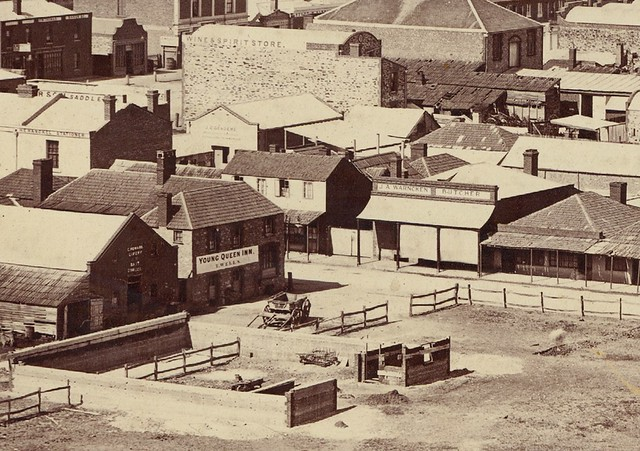
Young Queen Inn in 1865

She obtained the lease in 1913 of the Young Queen Inn in Gawler Place in Adelaide. She obtained some of the money from her husband John O'Brien who was a jockey. She had married him two years before even though her father disapproved of him.

O'Brien took over the Black Bull Inn in 1921 and her husband died in an accident while horse racing in the following year. Her children went to boarding schools and she ran the hotel.

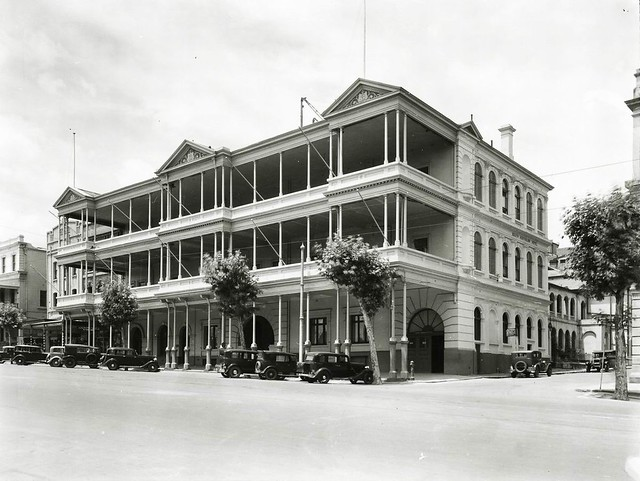
South Australia Hotel in 1936 when Louisa O'Brien was in charge

In 1934 she decided to lease the somewhat run down South Australia Hotel in Adelaide. It was said that she sacked all the kitchen staff and employed new people to transform the hotel by painting it in 48 hours. On the third day, lunch was served in a white and gold room that would seat 600 people. She employed a Ukrainian immigrant named Lewy Cotton who had been at the hotel since 1920. He had become head waiter in 1928. He became well known and it was said that the hotel's snobby clientele were pleased when they got a nod or a smile from Lewy. Lewy was dedicated and he rented a room nearby so that he could spend all his waking hours at the hotel six days a week. On Sundays Lewy saw his wife and child. O'Brien employed the architect Frank Kenneth Milne to do the interior design for her hotel. She was said to be the "grand duchess of the hotel world".

She was awarded an MBE in 1948 for her charity work. O'Brien died in her South Australia Hotel in Adelaide in 1957. She had three children and two daughters and all but one daughter survived her and several managed her hotels. In 1971 the South Australia hotel closed and it was replaced by a less characterful replacement.
