= Wrattonbully, South Australia =

Wrattonbully
- Town
- Coordinates: 37°10′8″S 140°56′38″E
- Country: Australia
- State: South Australia
- LGA: Naracoorte Lucindale Council
- Location: 327 km (203 mi) SE of Adelaide city centre; 75 km (47 mi) N of Mount Gambier
- Established: 12 April 2001

Government
  - State electorate: MacKillop
  - Federal division: Barker

Population
  - Total: 41 (SAL 2021)
- Time zone: UTC+9:30 (ACST)
  - Summer (DST): UTC+10:30 (ACST)
- Postcode: 5271
Localities around Wrattonbully
Joanna	Koppamurra	Langkoop
	Wrattonbully
Glenroy	Comaum	Poolaijelo

Wrattonbully is a locality located within the Naracoorte Lucindale Council in the Limestone Coast in the south east of South Australia about 327 kilometres (203 miles) south east of the Adelaide city centre. Wrattonbully gives its name to the wine region surrounding it, the Wrattonbully wine region.

Wrattonbully was established following World War II in 1946 as a soldier settlement scheme. Seventeen farms were allocated to returned soldiers. The community hall was established in 1958.

Wrattonbully shares a single CFS brigade with the neighbouring locality of Joanna.

Wrattonbully is located within the federal Division of Barker, the state electoral district of MacKillop, and the local government area of the Naracoorte Lucindale Council.
