= Ben Johnson (cricketer) =

Australian cricketer (born 1973)

Benjamin Andrew Johnson (born 1 August 1973 in Naracoorte, South Australia) is a former Australian first-class cricketer who played for the Southern Redbacks. A left-handed middle order batsman and part-time medium pace bowler, he played between 1994/95 and 2002/03

Johnson started his career well, scoring a half century on debut and then making 81 and 168 against WA in just fifth first-class match, aged 21. He went on to score 8 more hundreds for the Redbacks. In 2001-02 he became the first man since Bill Lawry to carry his bat in consecutive matches in Australia. He finished his 69-game career with 4038 runs at 34.81
