= Mount Light, South Australia =

Mount Light
- Town
- Coordinates: 37°0′31″S 140°40′42″E
- Country: Australia
- State: South Australia
- LGA: Naracoorte Lucindale Council
- Established: 12 April 2001

Government
  - State electorate: MacKillop
  - Federal division: Barker

Population
  - Total: 155 (2021 census)
- Postcode: 5271
Localities around Mount Light
Naracoorte	Naracoorte; Hynam	Hynam
Moyhall	Mount Light	Hynam; Koppamurra
Moyhall	Struan; Joanna	Koppamurra; Joanna

Mount Light is a locality located within the Naracoorte Lucindale Council in the Limestone Coast region of South Australia.

Mount Light boundaries span the Riddoch Highway and Langkoop Road (Naracoorte–Casterton Road) immediately southeast of Naracoorte. The locality has no built-up or commercial area anywhere in its boundaries.
