= Naracoorte Caves National Park =

- IUCN category II (national park)
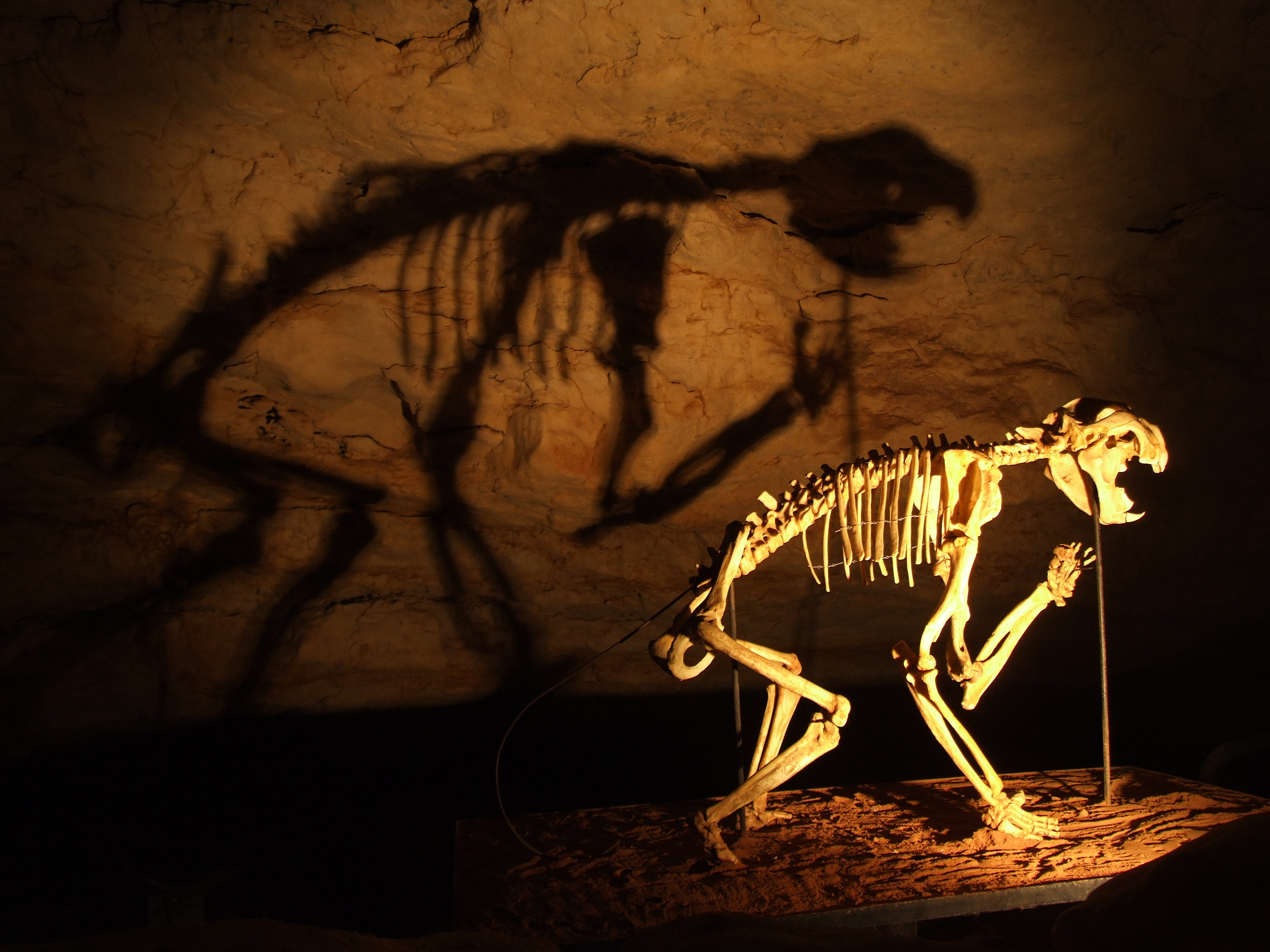
- Skeleton of a marsupial lion (Thylacoleo carnifex) in the Victoria Fossil Cave

- Location within South Australia
- Location: South Australia, Joanna & Mount Light
- Nearest city: Naracoorte
- Coordinates: 37°2′10″S 140°47′51.5″E
- Area: 6.60 km^{2} (2.55 sq mi)
- Established: Conservation Park 27 April 1972; National Park 18 January 2001
- Visitors: 90812 (in 2022)
- Governing body: Department of Environment and Water
- Website: Official website
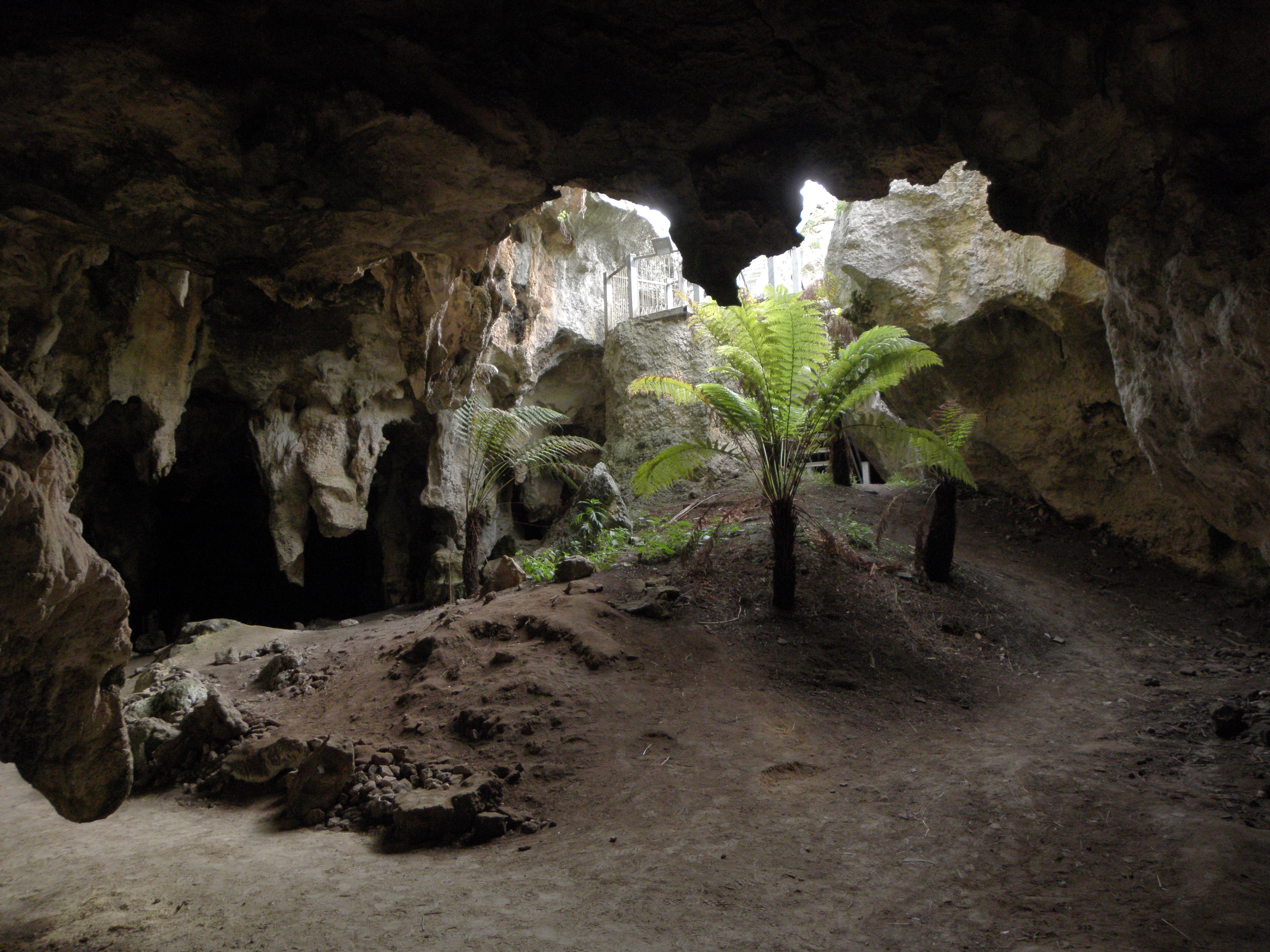

UNESCO World Heritage Site
- Part of: Australian Fossil Mammal Sites (Riversleigh/Naracoorte)
- Criteria: Natural: viii, ix
- Reference: 698-002
- Inscription: 1994 (18th Session)
- Area: 300 ha (740 acres)

Naracoorte Caves National Park is a national park near Naracoorte in the Limestone Coast tourism region in the south-east of South Australia (Australia). It was officially recognised in 1994 for its extensive fossil record when the site was inscribed on the World Heritage List, along with Riversleigh. The park preserves 6 km^{2} of remnant vegetation, with 26 caves contained within the 3.05 km^{2} World Heritage Area. Out of the 28 known caves in the park, only four are open to the public. Other caves are kept away from the public eye as they are important for scientific research and also for the protection of the caves and their contents. Many of the caves contain spectacular stalactites and stalagmites.

== History ==
=== European discovery ===
The caves, which are located within the boundaries of what is now the national park, were first encountered in 1845 with the discovery of Blanche Cave.

=== Naracoorte Forest Reserve ===
In 1885, the Department of Woods and Forests appointed a caretaker due to "the popularity of the caves and their vulnerability to vandalism".

=== First fossil collection ===
The first recorded collection of Pleistocene megafaunal fossils from the caves was a 1908 collection reported by William Reddan from Specimen Cave. This collection was carried out largely without regard for the stratigraphic context of the fossils, limiting the collection's scientific utility.

=== National Pleasure Resort ===
In 1916, the control of the portion of the forest reserve which contained many of the caves and which consisted of about 20 hectares (50 acres) of land was transferred from the Department of Woods and Forests to the Immigration, Publicity and Tourist Bureau who would manage it as a national pleasure resort under the National Pleasure Resort Act 1914 until 1972. The change of control was gazetted on 1 March 1917. The national pleasure resort's development into "an important regional tourist destination was greatly assisted by the discovery in 1969 in Victoria Cave of the largest known Australian Pleistocene vertebrate fossil cave deposit".

=== Conservation Park ===
On 27 April 1972, it was renamed as the Naracoorte Caves Conservation Park upon the proclamation of the National Parks and Wildlife Act 1972 which repealed the former act along with other statutes concerned with conservation. In 1982, the conservation park was listed on the now-defunct Register of the National Estate.

=== World heritage listing ===
On 17 December 1994, part of the conservation park, being an area of 300 hectares (740 acres) was "inscribed on the World Heritage List" along with the Riversleigh fossil site in Queensland as the Australian Fossil Mammal Sites (Riversleigh/Naracoorte).

=== National Park ===
On 18 January 2001, the Naracoorte Caves Conservation Park was abolished and the land that it occupied was reconstituted as a national park because it was considered to be "of national significance by reason of the natural features of the land" and was assigned the name, Naracoorte Caves National Park.

=== National heritage listing ===
On 21 May 2007 The Australian Fossil Mammal Sites was one of 15 World Heritage places to be added to the Australian National Heritage List.

=== State heritage listing ===
On 17 May 2017, the extent of the national park was listed as a state heritage place on the South Australian Heritage Register with the name of the Naracoorte Caves Complex.

== Visitor attraction ==
The park is a visitor destination in itself, with a camping ground and caravan park, dormitory accommodation for groups, picnic grounds and a licensed cafe. The range of visitor activities is extensive. Show cave tours are guided by professional interpreters through highly decorated caves with some tours visiting amazing fossil deposits. Modern technology has been utilised to show visitors the normally inaccessible interior of Bat Cave, where thousands of southern bent-wing bats breed each year. Other opportunities include adventure caving, a selection of specialty tours and special events. The Wonambi Fossil Centre, the park's visitor centre, features displays of fossils and bones found in the caves and dioramas of extinct animals.

== Structure ==
The limestone of the area was formed from coral and marine creatures 200 million years ago and again 20 million years ago when the land was below sea level. Ground water since then has dissolved and eroded some of the limestone, creating the caves. The caves, such as the Victoria Fossil Cave and Blanche Cave, are often not far below ground, and holes open up creating traps for the unwary. This is the source of the remarkable collection of fossils. Mammals and other land creatures have fallen into open caves and been unable to escape. The fossil record has been preserved in strata formed from eroded topsoil washed and blown in. In some places, the fossil-bearing silt is up to 20 metres thick. Some of these areas are being preserved for future research when better methods of dating and reconstructing fossil records may have been found. These fossil traps are especially significant for tracing Australian megafauna.

The latest research pushes back the date of the caves' formation to at least 1.34 million years ago.

== See also ==
- Protected areas of South Australia
- List of World Heritage Sites in Oceania
- List of fossil parks
