= Struan, South Australia =

Struan South Australia
- Coordinates: 37°3′56″S 140°45′36″E
- Population: 40 (2021 census)
- Established: 12 April 2001
- Postcode(s): 5271
- LGA(s): Naracoorte Lucindale Council
- State electorate(s): MacKillop
- Federal division(s): Barker
Mean max temp	Mean min temp	Annual rainfall
20.7 °C; 69 °F	8.0 °C; 46 °F	552.0 mm 21.7 in

Struan is a locality located within the Naracoorte Lucindale Council in the Limestone Coast region of South Australia.

The railway between Wolseley and Mount Gambier passed through here but closed on 12 April 1995.

== Climate ==
Struan has a warm-summer mediterranean climate (Köppen: Csb), with very warm, dry summers and cool, relatively wet winters. Average maxima vary from 28.9 °C (84.0 °F) in February to 14.0 °C (57.2 °F) in July and average minima fluctuate between 11.3 °C (52.3 °F) in February and 4.8 °C (40.6 °F) in July. Mean average annual precipitation is 552.0 mm (21.73 in), spread between 156.1 precipitation days. Annually, the town only experiences 41.6 clear days, whilst having 113.1 cloudy days. Extreme temperatures have ranged from −4.0 °C (24.8 °F) on 16 July 1979 to 43.6 °C (110.5 °F) on 20 February 1983. Sun data was taken from Kybybolite Research Centre 26.7 kilometres (16.6 mi) NE.

Climate data for Struan (37º06'00"S, 140º47'24"E, 65 m AMSL) (1974-1999 normals and extremes, sun 1965-1995)
Month	Jan	Feb	Mar	Apr	May	Jun	Jul	Aug	Sep	Oct	Nov	Dec	Year
Record high °C (°F)	43.2 (109.8)	43.6 (110.5)	40.5 (104.9)	34.2 (93.6)	29.7 (85.5)	22.7 (72.9)	22.0 (71.6)	24.9 (76.8)	31.2 (88.2)	34.0 (93.2)	39.4 (102.9)	43.1 (109.6)	43.6 (110.5)
Mean daily maximum °C (°F)	27.9 (82.2)	28.9 (84.0)	25.7 (78.3)	21.4 (70.5)	17.5 (63.5)	14.4 (57.9)	14.0 (57.2)	14.9 (58.8)	16.8 (62.2)	19.5 (67.1)	22.4 (72.3)	25.4 (77.7)	20.7 (69.3)
Mean daily minimum °C (°F)	10.9 (51.6)	11.3 (52.3)	10.8 (51.4)	8.4 (47.1)	7.6 (45.7)	5.4 (41.7)	4.8 (40.6)	5.4 (41.7)	6.5 (43.7)	7.1 (44.8)	8.2 (46.8)	9.9 (49.8)	8.0 (46.4)
Record low °C (°F)	2.5 (36.5)	2.5 (36.5)	2.0 (35.6)	0.0 (32.0)	−1.0 (30.2)	−2.9 (26.8)	−4.0 (24.8)	−1.1 (30.0)	−1.5 (29.3)	−2.4 (27.7)	0.0 (32.0)	1.0 (33.8)	−4.0 (24.8)
Average precipitation mm (inches)	26.0 (1.02)	10.9 (0.43)	24.6 (0.97)	35.3 (1.39)	52.0 (2.05)	66.8 (2.63)	82.2 (3.24)	73.7 (2.90)	63.4 (2.50)	49.4 (1.94)	37.3 (1.47)	26.6 (1.05)	552.0 (21.73)
Average precipitation days (≥ 0.2 mm)	6.9	4.4	8.1	11.8	15.6	17.7	19.5	20.2	17.7	13.8	10.9	9.5	156.1
Average afternoon relative humidity (%)	38	34	40	50	64	70	69	64	62	57	49	45	54
Average dew point °C (°F)	8.1 (46.6)	7.5 (45.5)	8.1 (46.6)	7.5 (45.5)	8.6 (47.5)	7.6 (45.7)	6.8 (44.2)	6.6 (43.9)	7.4 (45.3)	8.1 (46.6)	8.0 (46.4)	8.4 (47.1)	7.7 (45.9)
Mean monthly sunshine hours	288.3	262.7	229.4	174.0	136.4	114.0	130.2	158.1	165.0	217.0	232.5	254.2	2,361.8
Percentage possible sunshine	65	69	60	52	43	39	42	47	46	54	53	56	52
Source: Bureau of Meteorology (1974-1999 normals and extremes, sun 1965-1995)

== Demographics ==
As of the 2021 Australian census, 40 people resided in Struan, down from 45 in the 2016 census. The median age of persons in Struan was 46 years. There were equal amount of males and females, with 50% of the population being male and female. The average household size was 2.7 people per household.
