= Langkoop =

- Town
- Coordinates: 37°6′14″S 141°2′10″E
- Country: Australia
- State: Victoria
- LGA: Shire of West Wimmera

Government
  - State electorate: Lowan
  - Federal division: Mallee

Population
  - Total: 111 (2016 census)
- Postcode: 3318

Langkoop is a locality in the Shire of West Wimmera, Victoria, Australia. Langkoop was home to the current AFL footballer, 2020, 2023 Brownlow Medalist, 2024 Gary Ayres Award, 2x Premiership Captain and 3x Premiership Player Lachie Neale and Australian Hockey Player Hattie Shand.
