= Wild Dog Valley, South Australia =

Wild Dog Valley
- Town
- Coordinates: 36°52′54″S 140°44′37″E
- Country: Australia
- State: South Australia
- Region: Limestone Coast
- LGA: Naracoorte Lucindale Council
- Established: 12 April 2001

Government
  - State electorate: MacKillop
  - Federal division: Barker

Population
  - Total: 153 (2021 census)
- Time zone: UTC+9:30 (ACST)
  - Summer (DST): UTC+10:30 (ACST)
- Postcode: 5271
- County: MacDonnell; Robe

Wild Dog Valley is a locality located within the Naracoorte Lucindale Council in the Limestone Coast region of South Australia.
