= Naracoorte, South Australia =

Naracoorte
- Town
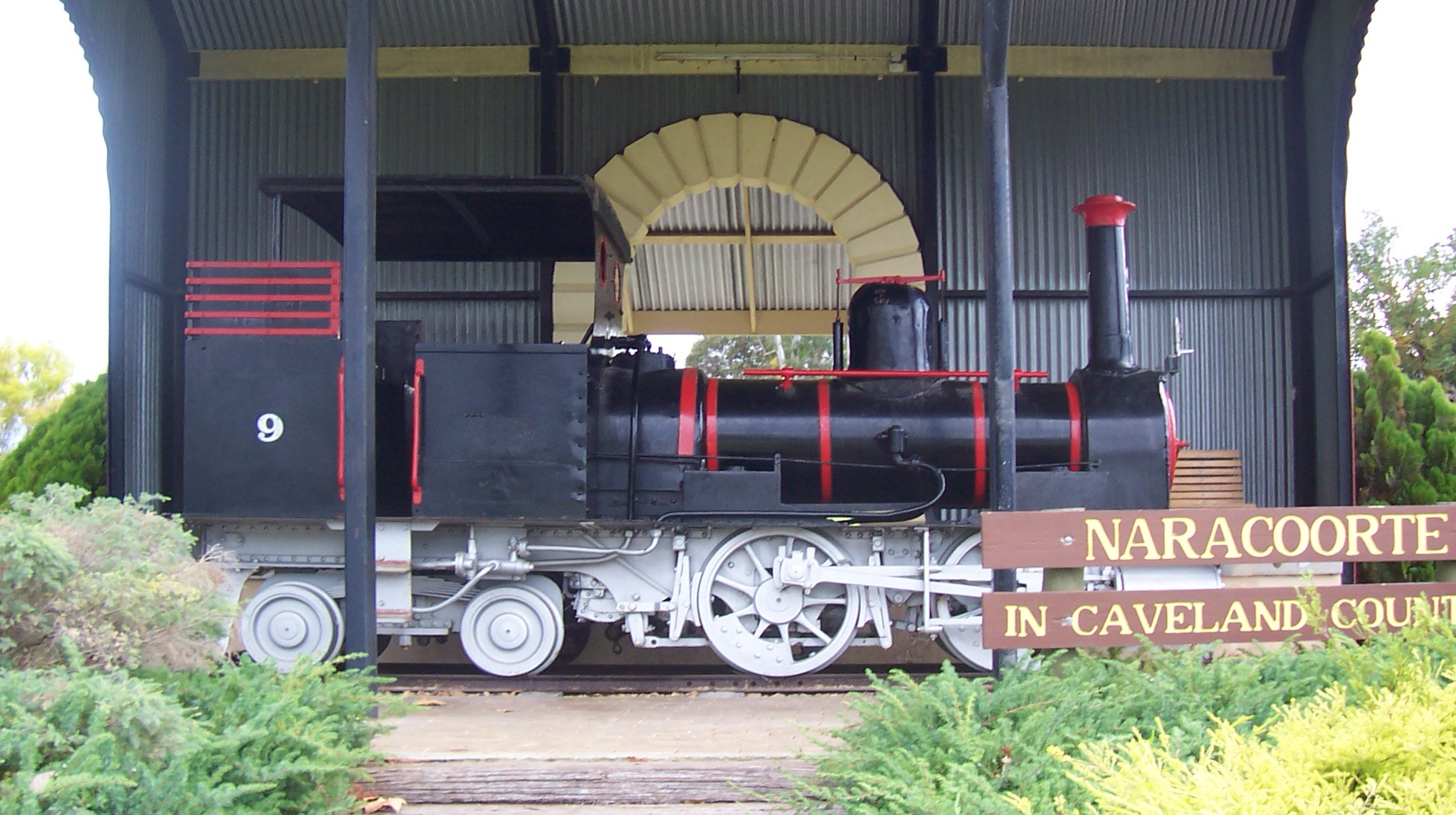
- A South Australian Railways V class locomotive in a park in Naracoorte

- Coordinates: 36°57′18″S 140°44′34″E
- Country: Australia
- State: South Australia
- Region: Limestone Coast
- LGA: Naracoorte Lucindale Council
- Location: 297 km (185 mi) SE of Adelaide; 97 km (60 mi) N of Mount Gambier
- Established: 1845

Government
  - State electorate: MacKillop
  - Federal division: Barker

Population
  - Total: 5,223 (UCL 2021)
- Time zone: UTC+9:30 (ACST)
  - Summer (DST): UTC+10:30 (ACST)
- Postcode: 5271
- County: Robe
- Mean max temp: 21.6 °C (70.9 °F)
- Mean min temp: 8.0 °C (46.4 °F)
- Annual rainfall: 483.8 mm (19.05 in)
Localities around Naracoorte
Lochaber	Lochaber; Wild Dog Valley	Hynam
Stewart Range	Naracoorte	Hynam
Moyhall	Mount Light	Mount Light
- Locations; Adjoining localities

Naracoorte is a town in the Limestone Coast region of South Australia, approximately 336 kilometres south-east of Adelaide and 100 kilometres north of Mount Gambier on the Riddoch Highway (A66).

== History ==
Before the colonisation of South Australia in 1836, the land now occupied by the town of Naracoorte was situated on the border of lands occupied by the Bindjali people to the east and Ngarrindjeri to the east.

Naracoorte was formed from the merger of two towns, Kincraig, founded in 1845 by Scottish explorer William Macintosh, and Narracoorte, established as a government settlement in 1847. The name has gone through a number of spellings, and is believed to be derived from the Aboriginal words for place of running water or large waterhole. It grew during the 1850s as a service town for people going to and from the Victorian gold rush. The post office opened in March 1853 and was known as Mosquito Plains post office until 1861.

The District Council of Naracoorte was established in August 1870 to locally govern the lands of the Hundred of Naracoorte. In 1888 the size of the district was dramatically expanded to include surrounding areas not yet locally governed. As a consequence, in February 1924 the Corporate Town of Naracoorte was established to provide dedicated local governance to the township.

In 1935 a cinema, the Austral Theatre, designed by Chris A. Smith, opened at 124-140 Smith Street. It was later known as the Rivoli Theatre.

The Kingston SE railway line was closed on 28 November 1987 and dismantled in September 1991 On 12 April 1995, the Mount Gambier to Wolseley line was closed, while pending gauge standardisation.

== Governance ==
Since 1993, Naracoorte has been locally governed by the amalgamated Naracoorte Lucindale Council. Naracoorte is in the state electoral district of MacKillop, and the federal Division of Barker.

== Economy ==
Naracoorte has historically been a service centre for the sheep, cattle and wheat farming industries in the surrounding area.

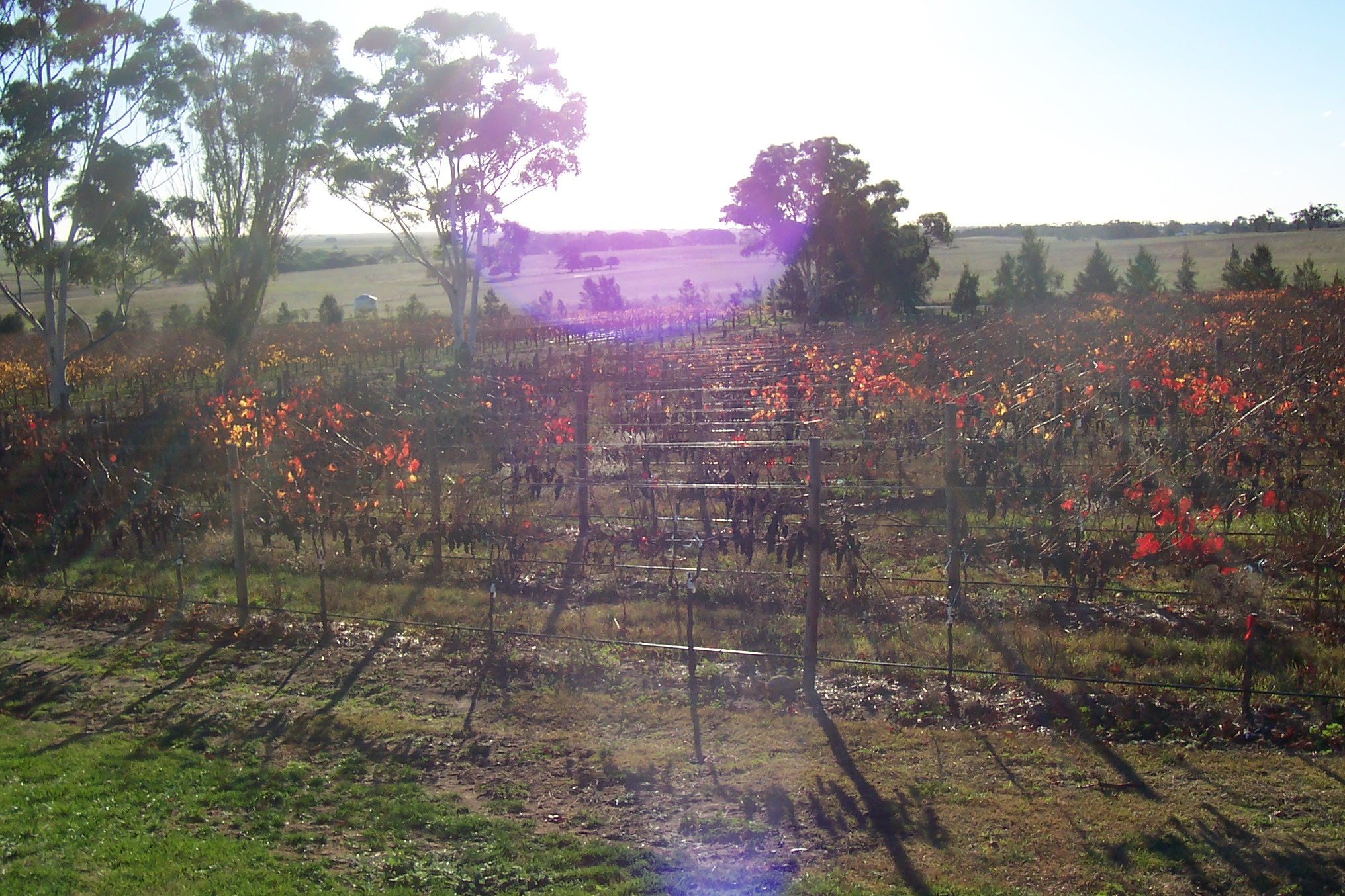
Vineyards surrounding Naracoorte

In recent decades, tourism has become a major industry due to the town's proximity to several wine regions and internationally recognised natural features. Both the World-Heritage-listed Naracoorte Caves National Park, the Ramsar-listed Bool and Hacks Lagoons are south of the township. The wine regions of Coonawarra and Wrattonbully lie further south, while the Padthaway lies to the north, placing Naracoorte at the centre of the three.

Naracoorte has a number of sites listed on the South Australian Heritage Register, including:

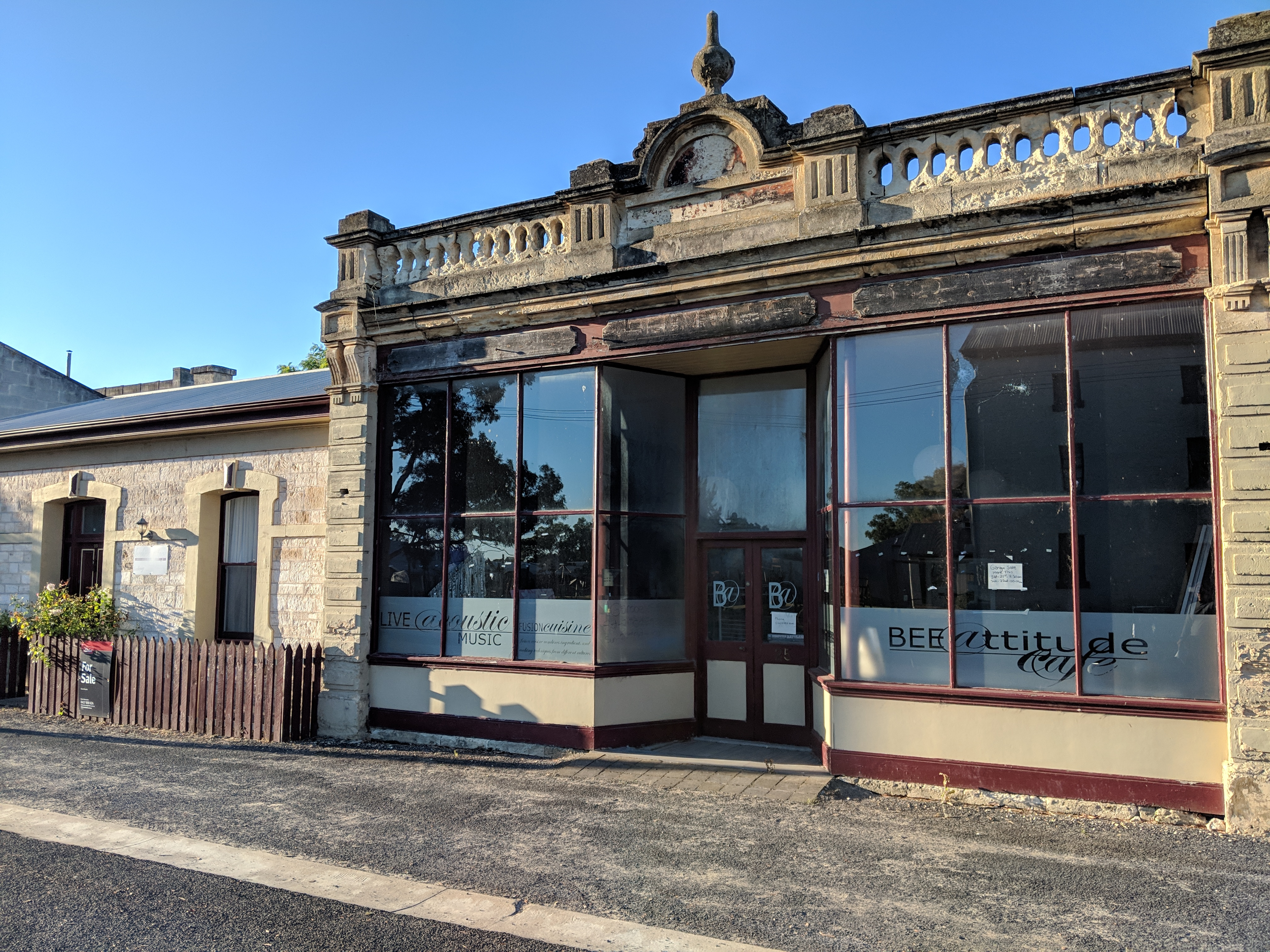
The former Limbert's store and residence on MacDonnell Street, operating as a café in 2019

- 6 Church Street: St Andrew's Presbyterian Church
- DeGaris Place: Commercial Bank of South Australia Building (current council office)
- 2 Laurie Crescent: St Paul's Anglican Church
- MacDonnell Street: Simpson's Flour Mill (current Sheep's Back Museum)
- 23–25 McDonnell Street: Limbert's Store and Residence
- 30 McLeay Street: Dartmoor Homestead
- 13 Ormerod Street: Old Naracoorte District Council Chambers
- 81 Smith Street: National Bank Building

Other places of interest to tourists include:

- The Visitor Information Centre and Sheep's Back Museum – MacDonnell Street
- Lions Pioneer Park – MacDonnell Street
- Tiny Train Park & Mini Golf – Park Terrace
- Naracoorte Art Gallery – Ormerod Street
- Mini Jumbuk Centre – 61 Smith Street
- Swimming Lake – Moore Street
- Jubilee Nature Park – Moore Street
- Russet Ridge Winery – Cnr Caves Road and Riddoch Highway
- Struan House – Riddoch Highway

== Education ==
There are three public schools: Naracoorte High on Stewart Terrace, Naracoorte Primary on Park Terrace and Naracoorte South Primary. Independent schools include Naracoorte Christian School, also called Sunrise Christian School, on Caves Road.

== Facilities ==
- Naracoorte Hospital
- Police at 66 Smith Street
- Transport – Bus station at 170 Smith Street
- The Catholic Church is dedicated to Saint Thomas Aquinas.

== Climate ==
Naracoorte has a dry temperate mediterranean climate (Köppen: Csb, Trewartha: Csbk), bordering on a semi-arid climate (Köppen: BSk). It has warm, dry summers that are frequently interrupted by cold fronts, giving way to very low dew points and a significant diurnal range. Winters are cool and cloudy with frequent light showers.

Climate data for Naracoorte Aerodrome (1998–2022); 50 m AMSL; 36.98° S, 140.73° E
Month	Jan	Feb	Mar	Apr	May	Jun	Jul	Aug	Sep	Oct	Nov	Dec	Year
Record high °C (°F)	45.8 (114.4)	45.3 (113.5)	42.0 (107.6)	36.9 (98.4)	29.0 (84.2)	23.0 (73.4)	19.0 (66.2)	26.5 (79.7)	30.3 (86.5)	37.0 (98.6)	40.3 (104.5)	47.7 (117.9)	47.7 (117.9)
Mean daily maximum °C (°F)	29.9 (85.8)	29.0 (84.2)	26.2 (79.2)	22.1 (71.8)	17.7 (63.9)	14.9 (58.8)	14.0 (57.2)	15.3 (59.5)	17.4 (63.3)	20.6 (69.1)	24.5 (76.1)	27.4 (81.3)	21.6 (70.9)
Mean daily minimum °C (°F)	11.8 (53.2)	11.8 (53.2)	10.1 (50.2)	8.2 (46.8)	7.3 (45.1)	5.5 (41.9)	5.3 (41.5)	5.5 (41.9)	6.4 (43.5)	7.0 (44.6)	8.7 (47.7)	10.1 (50.2)	8.1 (46.7)
Record low °C (°F)	1.0 (33.8)	1.9 (35.4)	−1.0 (30.2)	−3.0 (26.6)	−4.4 (24.1)	−4.0 (24.8)	−3.0 (26.6)	−4.0 (24.8)	−3.0 (26.6)	−3.0 (26.6)	−2.0 (28.4)	1.0 (33.8)	−4.4 (24.1)
Average precipitation mm (inches)	20.8 (0.82)	19.6 (0.77)	23.4 (0.92)	26.6 (1.05)	42.8 (1.69)	55.5 (2.19)	61.3 (2.41)	70.3 (2.77)	51.9 (2.04)	41.0 (1.61)	34.4 (1.35)	34.5 (1.36)	484.8 (19.09)
Average precipitation days (≥ 0.2 mm)	4.7	4.7	7.4	10.8	17.1	17.5	19.3	19.7	17.3	12.6	9.3	8.2	148.6
Average afternoon relative humidity (%)	32	34	38	45	60	67	69	64	61	52	42	35	50
Average dew point °C (°F)	7.8 (46.0)	8.9 (48.0)	8.0 (46.4)	7.3 (45.1)	8.4 (47.1)	7.6 (45.7)	7.1 (44.8)	6.9 (44.4)	7.8 (46.0)	7.2 (45.0)	7.9 (46.2)	6.8 (44.2)	7.6 (45.7)
Source: Australian Bureau of Meteorology (Naracoorte Aerodrome, 1998–2022)

== Media ==
=== Newspapers ===
The town is home to The Naracoorte Herald, a newspaper published in the town under that name since 1948. Prior to that, the newspaper had used the older spelling of the town, and was known as The Narracoorte Herald, which had begun publication on 14 December 1875. It was formerly part of Fairfax Media, with the Fairfax regional office located in the town on Smith Street. Since mid 2019, it has been owned by Australian Community Media, who purchased the Rural Press publications when Fairfax was bought by Nine.

In 1912, a nearby publication, the Tatiara and Lawloit News (13 June 1908 – 15 June 1912), which also printed in Naracoorte, was absorbed into the Herald.

In May 2020, a new rival paper, "Naracoorte Community News" was launched by Michael Waite to fill the gap left by the suspension of ‘'The Naracoorte Herald'’ during the COVID-19 pandemic.

=== Television ===
- The Australian Broadcasting Corporation (ABC) – ABC, ABC TV Plus (formerly ABC Comedy)/ABC Kids, ABC Me, ABC News (digital channels)
- The Special Broadcasting Service (SBS) – SBS, SBS Viceland, SBS World Movies, SBS Food, SBS WorldWatch, NITV (digital channels)
- WIN Television (7, 9 & 10) as SES-8 – SES-8 relays the programming from Seven Network (Seven SA), Nine Network (Nine SA) & Network 10 (10 SA).
- Foxtel – Subscription Television service Foxtel is also available via satellite.

WIN Television's Channel 10 broadcasts Network Ten programming, Channel Seven broadcasts Seven Network programming & Channel Nine broadcasts Nine Network programming. The programming schedules for these channels is the same as Channel Nine, Channel Seven and Channel Ten in Adelaide. Local commercials are inserted and some variations made for coverage of Australian Football League or National Rugby League matches, state and national news, and current affairs programs, some lifestyle and light entertainment shows and infomercials.

=== Radio ===
ABC

- ABC South East SA (1161 AM)
- ABC Triple J (102.5 FM)
- ABC Radio National (103.3 FM)
- ABC Classic (104.1 FM)
- ABC NewsRadio (105.7 FM)

Commercial

- Radio TAB
- SAFM (100.9 FM) (formerly Hit FM)

Community

- Connect FM (Formerly 5TCB FM) (89.7 FM)
- LIME FM (99.3 FM) (Formerly Rhema FM)

== Sport ==
Naracoorte has an Australian Rules football team competing in the Kowree-Naracoorte-Tatiara Football League. Naracoorte supplies players for a number of surrounding teams, such as Kybybolite, Padthaway and Border Districts.

Naracoorte has a rugby league team that competes in the Limestone Coast Rugby League called the Naracoorte Jets.

Naracoorte has a soccer club competing in the Limestone Coast Football Association.

The Naracoorte Racing Club holds thoroughbred horse racing at its track located 4 kilometres from the centre of the town.

== Notable residents ==
- George Ash, newspaper editor and politician
- Thomas Wilde Boothby, politician
- Sam Burston, grazier
- Lachlan Busiko, hockey player
- Mountifort Conner, auctioneer and politician
- Elizee De Garis, irrigationist
- Russell Dumas, public servant and engineer
- Aaron Fiora, Australian rules footballer
- James Gardiner, politician
- Ben Hood, politician
- Lucy Penelope Hood, politician
- Percy Hutton, cricketer
- Ben Johnson, cricketer
- Harvey Jolly, cricketer
- Park Laurie, pastoralist and politician
- John Baxter Mather, journalist and newspaper proprietor
- Alexander McLachlan, politician
- Lachie Neale, Australian rules footballer
- Louisa O'Brien, hotelier
- Alan Rawlinson, fighter ace
- Allan Rodda, politician
- Angus Schumacher, Australian rules footballer
- George Byng Scott, Government Resident of the Northern Territory
- Hattie Shand, hockey player
- William Shiels, 16th Premier of Victoria
- Cam Sutcliffe, Australian rules footballer
- Jack Trengove, Australian rules footballer
- Jessica Trengove, long distance runner
