= Koppamurra, South Australia =

Koppamurra South Australia
- Coordinates: 37°4′15″S 140°52′53″E
- Population: 60 (SAL 2021)
- Established: 12 April 2001
- Postcode(s): 5271
- LGA(s): Naracoorte Lucindale Council
- State electorate(s): MacKillop
- Federal division(s): Barker

Koppamurra is a locality located within the Naracoorte Lucindale Council in the Limestone Coast region of South Australia. It abuts the eastern border of the state with Victoria.

The Koppamurra rare-earth mining project, owned by Australian Rare Earths, is based on a deposit containing four critical rare earth elements: praseodymium, neodymium, terbium, and dysprosium. As of May 2023, the project held multiple exploration licences including four in South Australia, and one in Victoria, covering over 4,000 km^{2} (1,500 sq mi). In December 2024 the project received a AU$5 million government grant under its "International Partnerships in Critical Minerals" program, to support a demonstration plant.
