= List of parks and gardens in rural South Australia =

List of parks and gardens in rural South Australia refers to parks and gardens that located within the rural areas of South Australia as distinguished from those located within the Adelaide metropolitan area.

== Adelaide Hills ==
The following parks and gardens are located within the following local government areas within the South Australian government region known as Adelaide Hills - Adelaide Hills Council and the District Council of Mount Barker.

=== Adelaide Hills ===
- Morialta Recreation Area, Stradbroke Road Woodforde
- Mount Lofty Botanic Garden, Lampert Road, Crafers
- Federation Park, Adelaide to Mannum Road Gumeracha
- Stirling Linear Park, Pomona Road Stirling

=== Mount Barker ===
- Keith Stevenson Park, Adelaide Road Mount Barker
- Anembo Park, North Terrace, Littlehampton

== Barossa Light and Lower North ==
The following parks and gardens are located within the following local government areas within the South Australian government region known as the Barossa Light and Lower North - Barossa Council, Town of Gawler, Light Regional Council and Adelaide Plains Council.

=== Barossa ===
- Pioneer Park, Murray Street Angaston
- Nuriootpa Linear Park, Barossa Valley Highway Nuriootpa
- Angas Recreation Park, Washington Street Angaston
- Barossa Bushgardens, Penrice Road Nuriootpa
- Curdnatta Park, Davies Road, Cockatoo Valley
- Moculta Soldiers Memorial Hall & Recreation Park, Keyneton Road Moculta
- Murray Recreation Park, Eden Valley Road, Eden Valley
- Stockwell Recreation Park, Sturt Highway Stockwell
- Talunga Recreation Park, Melrose Street Mount Pleasant
- Tanunda Recreation Park, Tanunda
- Williamstown Queen Victoria Jubilee Park, Williamstown

=== Gawler ===
- Apex Park Reserve, Julian Whitelaw Terrace Gawler
- Clonlea Park, Murray Road Gawler
- Dead Man Pass Reserve
- Eldred Riggs Reserve
- Elliott Goodger Memorial Park (Willaston Oval)
- Pioneer Park
- Princes Park
- South Gawler Oval
- Gawler Oval

=== Light ===
- Davidson Reserve, Kapunda
- Pengilly Scrub (Mudla Wirra Reserve), Walseys
- The Pines Conservation Reserve, north of Kapunda
- Dutton Park, Kapunda
- Freeling Community Recreation Park, Freeling
- Greenock Centenary Park, Greenock
- Wasleys Recreation Park, Wasleys

=== Adelaide Plains ===
- Aunger Ponds, Lewiston
- Bakers Wetlands, Lewiston
- Barabba Reserve, Barabba
- Blue Bonnet Reserve, Lower Light
- Camel Reserve, Lewiston
- Canala Reserve, Two Wells
- Cannizzaro Road Reserve, Lewiston
- Clydesdale Reserve, Two Wells
- Dublin Lions Park, Dublin
- Dublin Oval, Dublin
- Dublin Parklands, Dublin
- Dublin Playground, Dublin
- Duck Pond, Mallala
- East Reserve, Mallala
- Fletcher Reserve, Lewiston
- Gameau Reserve, Two Wells
- Hams Park, Lewiston
- Harniman Reserve, Lewiston
- Hart Reserve, Two Wells
- Historic Wells, Two Wells
- Humzy Reserve, Lewiston
- Lewiston Playground, Lewiston
- Lewiston Wetlands, Lewiston
- Mallala Hub/Arbor, Mallala
- Mallala Oval Complex, Mallala
- Mallala Playground, Mallala
- Parham Foreshore, Parham
- Rockies Reserve, Barabba
- Thompsons Beach Foreshore, Thompson Beach
- Two Wells Dog Park, Two Wells
- Two Wells Oval Complex, Two Wells
- Two Wells Rose Gardens, Two Wells
- Webb Beach Foreshore, Webb Beach

== Eyre Western ==
The following parks and gardens are located within the following local government areas within the South Australian government region known as the Eyre Western - District Council of Ceduna, District Council of Cleve, District Council of Elliston, District Council of Franklin Harbour, District Council of Kimba, District Council of Lower Eyre Peninsula, City of Port Lincoln, District Council of Streaky Bay, District Council of Tumby Bay, City of Whyalla and Wudinna District Council.

=== Ceduna ===
- Apex Park, Ceduna
- Big 4 Ceduna Tourist Park, Ceduna
- Ceduna Foreshore Park Lands, Ceduna
- Far West Aboriginal Sporting Complex, Ceduna

=== Cleve ===
- Redbanks, Arno Bay
- Wharminda Soaks, Wharminda
- Jetty Reserve, Turnbull Park Arno Bay
- Lions Centenary Park, Rudall Road Arno Bay
- Yeldulknie Reservoir, Cleve

=== Kimba ===
- Lions/Apex park, Kimba
- Memorial Garden, High Street Kimba

=== Lower Eyre Peninsula ===
- Coffin Bay Foreshore, Coffin Bay
- Cummins Railway Triangle (Park), Bruce Terrace Cummins

=== Streaky Bay ===
- Doctors Beach, Streaky Bay
- Eyre Avenue Lawns, Streaky Bay
- Lions Park, Streaky Bay
- Poochera Oval Precinct, Poochera
- Poochera Town Centre, Poochera
- Sceale Bay Foreshore Park, Sceale Bay
- Streaky Bay Foreshore Lawns, Streaky Bay
- Streaky Bay Oval Precinct, Streaky Bay
- Streaky Bay Skate Park, Streaky Bay
- Wirrulla Oval Precinct, Wirrulla
- Wirrulla Town Centre, Wirrulla

=== Tumby Bay ===
- Anear Park, Port Neill
- Flinders Park, Tumby Bay
- Foreshore Playground, Tumby Bay
- Heritage Park, Port Neill
- Island Lookout, Tumby Bay
- Island Playground, Tumby Bay
- Koppio Old School Playground, Koppio
- Lions Park, Tumby Bay
- Lipson Oval, Lipson
- Moody Tanks Railway Reserve, Ungarra
- Mortlock Park, Tumby Bay
- Port Neill Foreshore, Port Neill
- Port Neill Oval, Port Neill
- Port Neill Tennis Courts, Port Neill
- Ramsey Bicentennial Gardens, Port Neill
- Tod River Reservoir
- Travellers Rest, Tumby Bay
- Tumby Bay Oval, Tumby Bay
- Ungarra Memorial Park, Ungarra
- Ungarra Oval, Ungarra
- Yallunda Flat Showgrounds, Tumby Bay

=== Whyalla ===
- Ada Ryan Gardens, Watson Terrace Whyalla
- Civic Park, Nicolson Avenue Whyalla Norrie

=== Wudinna ===
- Mount Wudinna, Wudinna
- Pildappa Rock, Minnipa
- Polkdinney Park, Eyre Highway Kyancutta
- Polda Rock, Wudinna
- Standley Park, Medley Terrace Wudinna
- Tcharkulda Hill, Minnipa
- Wudinna Apex Recreation Park, Wudinna
- Wudinna Sports Grounds, Wudinna

== Far North ==
The following parks and gardens are located within the following local government areas within the South Australian government region known as the Far North - District Council of Coober Pedy, Flinders Ranges Council, the City of Port Augusta and the Municipal Council of Roxby Downs.

=== Flinders Ranges ===
- Lions Park, Quorn
- Powell Gardens, Quorn
- Quorn Tennis and Netball Courts, Quorn
- Quorn Town Oval, Quorn
- Thompson Memorial Playground, Quorn
- Blue Burt Park and Playground, Hawker
- Hawker Community Sporting Centre and Playground, Hawker

=== Port Augusta ===
- Gladstone Square, Port Augusta
- Eastside Foreshore, Port Augusta
- Apex Park, Port Augusta
- Volunteer Park, Port Augusta
- Keith Jones Memorial Park, Port Augusta
- Lions Jubilee Park, Port Augusta
- Central Oval, Port Augusta
- Arboretum Park, Port Augusta
- Back Beach, Port Augusta
- Australian Arid Lands Botanic Garden, Port Augusta West
- Westside Foreshore, London Road Port Augusta
- Water Tower Lookout, Port Augusta West
- Rotary Park, Shirley Street Port Augusta West
- Northey Crescent, Port Augusta West
- Sid Welk Park, Port Augusta West
- Robert 'Bert' McKenzie Memorial Parkland, Stirling North

=== Roxby Downs ===
- Roxby Downs Cultural and Leisure Precinct, Richardson Place Roxby Downs

== Fleurieu and Kangaroo Island ==
The following parks and gardens are located within the following local government areas within the South Australian government region known as the Fleurieu and Kangaroo Island - Alexandrina Council, Kangaroo Island Council, the City of Victor Harbor and the District Council of Yankalilla.

=== Alexandrina ===
- Commodore Reserve, Basham Parade Port Elliot
- Memorial Park, Coleman Terrace Strathalbyn
- Port Elliot Half-Pipe (Skate Park) Port Elliot
- Middleton Half Pipe (Skate Park) Middleton
- Goolwa Skate Park & BMX Track Goolwa
- Strathalbyn Skate Park, Strathalbyn
- Goolwa Oval, Hutchinson Street Goolwa
- Port Elliot Oval, Oval North Terrace Port Elliot
- Strathalbyn Oval, Coronation Road Strathalbyn
- Langhorne Creek Oval, Murray Road Langhorne Creek
- Ashbourne Oval, Bull Creek Road Ashbourne
- Mount Compass Community Centre Oval, Burgess Drive Mount Compass
- Mount Compass Burgess Oval, Peters Terrace Mount Compass
- Milang Oval, Milang Road Milang
- Finniss Oval, Hamley Terrace Finniss

=== Kangaroo Island ===
- American River Foreshore, American River
- Baudin Beach Foreshore, Baudin Beach
- Christmas Cove, Penneshaw
- Emu Bay Foreshore, Emu Bay
- Frenchmans Rock, Penneshaw
- Hanson Bay Foreshore,
- Independence Point, American River
- Lions Park, Parndana
- Lloyd Collins Reserve, Penneshaw
- Memorial Park, Kingscote
- North Terrace Gardens, Penneshaw
- Pennington Bay
- Pioneer Park, Parndana
- Prospect Hill
- Reeves Point, Kingscote
- Remembrance Reserve, American River
- Snelling Beach Foreshore (garden), Middle River
- Stokes Bay (park), Stokes Bay
- Tidal Pool, Kingscote
- Wright Park, Kingscote

=== Victor Harbor ===
- Soldiers Memorial Park - Esplanade, Victor Harbor

=== Yankalilla ===
- Apex Park, Normanville
- Banksia Park, Normanville
- Broadbeach Drive Reserve, Carrickalinga
- Bungala Park, Normanville
- Edwards Avenue, Normanville
- Haycocks Point, Carrickalinga
- Ingalalla Waterfalls, Hay Flat
- Jetty Caravan Park, Normanville
- Katherine Drive Reserve, Normanville
- Manisty Drive Reserve, Yankalilla
- Memorial Park, Yankalilla
- Mitchell Reserve, Carrickalinga
- Myponga Beach Reserve, Myponga Beach
- Myponga Picnic Reserve, Myponga
- Myponga Reservoir Lookout, Myponga
- Normanville Foreshore, Normanville
- Normanville Rise Reserve, Normanville
- Old War Memorial, Yankalilla
- Rapid Bay Camping Ground, Rapid Bay
- Robert Norman Park, Normanville
- Second Valley Playground, Second Valley
- Second Valley Soldiers Memorial Reserve, Second Valley
- Tuna Crescent Reserve, Carrickalinga
- War Memorial Reserve, Yankalilla
- Yankalilla Lions Youth Park, Yankalilla

== Limestone Coast ==
The following parks and gardens are located within the following local government areas within the South Australian government region known as the Limestone Coast - District Council of Grant, Kingston District Council, The City of Mount Gambier, Naracoorte Lucindale Council, District Council of Robe, Tatiara District Council and Wattle Range Council.

=== Grant ===
- Blackfellows Caves, Hammer Parade, Blackfellows Caves
- Carpenter Rocks, Carpenter Rocks Road, Carpenter Rocks
- Donovans (upper), Lot 68 Adams Street Donovans
- Donovans (lower), Donovans Landing Access Donovans
- Kongorong, 1 Hay Terrace Kongorong
- Little Blue Lake, Mount Salt Road, Mount Schank
- Mount Schank, Post Office Road, Mount Schank
- Nene Valley, 5 Neville Avenue Nene Valley
- Port MacDonnell (Football Club), Elizabeth Street Port MacDonnell
- Lions Park, Sea Parade Port MacDonnell
- Little Hunter, East of Jetty, Sea Parade Port MacDonnell
- Periwinkles, West of Jetty, Sea Parade Port MacDonnell
- Woolwash, Sea Parade, Port MacDonnell
- Tarpeena, Edward Street Tarpeena
- Yahl, Yahl Hall Road Yahl

=== Kingston ===
- Apex Park, Kingston SE
- Burt Baseley Memorial Park, Kingston SE
- Family Tree Park, Kingston SE
- Kingston Soldiers Memorial Park, Kingston SE
- Lions Park, Kingston SE
- Old School Oval, Kingston SE
- Wirrilder Park, Kingston SE

=== Mount Gambier ===
- Valley Lake - Haig Drive, Mount Gambier

=== Naracoorte Lucindale ===
- Naracoorte Nature Park - Naracoorte Creek, Naracoorte

=== Robe ===
- Playground, Longbeach (near caravan park) Robe
- Playground, foreshore (opposite the post office) Robe
- Playground, Robe Street Robe

=== Tatiara ===
- Tolmer Park, Bordertown
- Bordertown Swimming Pool, Bordertown
- Apex Park, Bordertown
- Virgo Park, Bordertown
- Bowman Park, Bordertown
- Soldiers Park, Bordertown
- Wildlife Park, Bordertown
- Recreation Lake, Bordertown
- Memorial Park, Bordertown
- Mundulla Oval, Mundulla
- Moot Yang Gunya Swamp, Mundulla
- Community Centre, Wolseley
- Western Flat Recreation Reserve, Western Flat
- Hartley Randell Park, Keith
- Don Moseley Park, Keith
- Pilmore Park, Keith
- Soldier's Park, Keith
- Lions Park, Keith
- "Cow Patch", Keith
- Apex Park, Padthaway
- Settlers Memorial Park, Padthaway
- Pioneers Memorial Park, Padthaway
- Recreation Reserve, Willalooka

=== Wattle Range ===
- Beachport Cricket Oval, Millicent Road Beachport
- Centennial Park, Somerville Street, Beachport
- Nigel Philip Harvey Playground, corner of George and Giles Streets, Southend
- Southend Community Centre, Eliza Street, Southend
- Southern Ocean Caravan Park, Railway Terrace, Beachport
- Susan Wilson Playground, Railway Terrace, Beachport
- Coonawarra Park, Memorial Drive Coonawarra
- Kalangadoo Institute, George Street Kalangadoo
- Kalangadoo Lions Park, Eliza Street Kalangadoo
- Kalangadoo Railway Park, Railway Terrace, Kalangadoo
- Kalangadoo War Memorial Oval, Kalangadoo
- Bolton Oval, Mount Gambier Road Millicent
- Brennan Park, Brennan Street Millicent
- Civic and Arts Centre Reserve, George Street Millicent
- Commercial Park, Commercial Street Millicent
- Corcoran Park, Railway Terrace West Millicent
- Domain Playground Park, Ridge Terrace Millicent
- George Street Reserve, George Street Millicent
- Jubilee Park, North Terrace Millicent
- Hains Park, East Terrace Tantanoola
- Hatherleigh Sport & Recreation Centre, North East Terrace Hatherleigh
- Hart Park, Hart Street Millicent
- Kealy Park, English Drive Millicent
- Kelae Glade Park, Kirip Road Glencoe
- McArthur Park, McArthur Street Millicent
- McLaughlin Park, Williams Road Millicent
- Millicent Swimming Lake, Park Terrace Millicent
- Monash Park, Monash Terrace Millicent
- Centennial Park, George Street Millicent
- Mount Burr Football Oval, Riddoch Avenue Mount Burr
- Nitschke Park, Nitschke Street Millicent
- Norm Facey Oval, McLaughlin Park, Williams Road Millicent
- Rotary Club Centenary Park, Battye Street Millicent
- Rendelsham Cricket Club, Rendelsham
- Tantanoola Football Club, South Terrace Tantanoola
- Tantanoola Park, North Terrace Tantanoola
- Greenrise Lake Reserve, Riddoch Highway Penola
- Lions Park, Shanks Street Penola
- McCorquindale Park, Cameron Street Penola
- Mother Mary Mackillop Memorial Park, Bowden Street Penola
- Penola War Memorial Park, Church Street Penola

== Murray Mallee ==
The following parks and gardens are located within the following local government areas within the South Australian government region known as the Murray Mallee - Berri Barmera Council, District Council of Karoonda East Murray, District Council of Loxton Waikerie, Mid Murray Council, Rural City of Murray Bridge, Renmark Paringa Council, Southern Mallee District Council and Coorong District Council.

=== Berri Barmera ===
- Alan Glassey Park, Berri
- Berri Lookout Gardens, Berri
- Berri Marina Park, Berri
- Berri No.1 Oval, Berri
- Berri No 2. Oval, Berri
- Berri Riverfront, Berri
- Berri Swim Pool Park, Berri
- Bruce Oval, Barmera
- Cobdogla Oval, Cobdogla
- Cobdogla Park, Cobdogla
- Colin Jennings Apex Park, Barmera
- Curnow Park, Berri
- Fletcher Park, Barmera
- Johnny Bains Park, Barmera
- Lake Vista Park, Barmera
- Martins Bend, Berri
- Mathews Park and Playground, Berri
- Memorial Oval, Barmera
- Monash Adventure Park, Monash
- Monash Oval, Monash
- Morris Street Park, Loveday
- North Lake, Barmera
- Payne Reserve, Barmera
- Pepper Tree Hill reserve, Berri
- Pioneer Park, Berri
- Pioneer Park Hall of Fame, Berri
- Pump Station Park, Berri
- Rotary Park, Berri
- Rowe Reserve, Berri
- Sanford Park, Berri
- Sargent Park, Barmera
- Sedunary Park (Playspace), Barmera

=== Karoonda East Murray ===
- Karoonda Caravan & Cabin Park, Karoonda
- Karoonda Recreation Reserve, Karoonda
- Railway Terrace Lawns, Karoonda

=== Loxton Waikerie ===
- Alawoona Playground, Alawoona
- Anzac Crescent Playground, Loxton
- Apex Park, Waikerie
- Civic Centre Grounds, Waikerie
- Harry Tickle Memorial Swimming Pool, Loxton
- Heppner Park, Waikerie
- Hilbig Street Playground, Loxton
- Ifould Park, Waikerie
- John Jennings Park, Waikerie
- Kaesler Street Playground, Loxton
- Kingston Cemetery, Kingston-On-Murray
- Kingston Riverfront, Kingston-On-Murray
- Lions Riverfront Playground, Waikerie
- Loxton Apex Park, Loxton
- Loxton Aquatic Club, Loxton
- Loxton Cemetery, Loxton
- Loxton Horse and Pony Club, Loxton
- Loxton Lions Park, Loxton
- Loxton North Recreation Grounds, Loxton
- Loxton Riverfront, Loxton
- Loxton Show and Recreations Grounds, Loxton
- Moorook Cemetery, Moorook
- Moorook Oval, Moorook
- Moorook Riverfront, Moorook
- Paisley Riverfront, Paisley
- Paruna Oval, Paruna
- Pioneer Gardens, Waikerie
- Promnitz Gardens, Waikerie
- Ramco Apex Park, Ramco
- Ramco Cemetery, Ramco
- Ramco Community Recreation Grounds, Ramco
- Sturt Street Playground, Loxton
- Waikerie Apex Park, Waikerie
- Waikerie Cemetery, Waikerie
- Waikerie Cemetery, Waikerie
- Waikerie Hockey & Cricket Oval, Waikerie
- Waikerie Lions Park, Waikerie
- Waikerie Memorial Gardens, Waikerie
- Waikerie Oval, Waikerie
- Waikerie Pony Club, Waikerie
- Waikerie Recreation Centre, Waikerie
- Waikerie Riverfront, Waikerie
- Waikerie Swimming Pool, Waikerie
- Wunkar Oval, Wunkar

=== Mid Murray ===
- Bolto Reserve, Mannum
- W.A.B. Reserve, Bowhill
- Cambrai Park Reserve Cambrai
- Five Mile Riverfront Reserve, Mannum
- Graeme Claxton Reserve, Cadell
- Haythorpe, Mannum
- John Christian Reserve, Cambrai
- Len Batten Reserve, Walker Flat
- Arnold Park Reserve, Mannum
- Mary-Ann Reserve, Mannum
- Mannum Waterfalls Reserve, Mannum
- Purnong Ferry Landing, Purnong
- Schwertfegers Swamp Reserve, Sedan
- Seven Mile Riverfront, Mannum
- Shell Hill Reserve, near Black Hill
- Tom Groggin Reserve, Younghusband
- Towitta Park, Towitta
- TP Bellchambers Reserve, Milendella
- Younghusband Reserve, Younghusband
- Zadows Landing Reserve, Wall Flat

=== Murray Bridge ===
- Sturt Reserve - Jaensch Road, Murray Bridge

=== Southern Mallee ===
- Pinnaroo Animal Park, Pinnaroo
- Pinnaroo Lions Playground, Pinnaroo
- Pinnaroo Showground and Oval, Pinnaroo
- Pinnaroo Wetlands, Pinnaroo
- Women's Agricultural Bureau Memorial Garden, Pinnaroo

=== Coorong ===
- Coomandook Park, Coomandook
- Coonalpyn Oval, Coonalpyn
- Coonalpyn Playground, Coonalpyn
- Coonalpyn Soldiers Memorial Park, Coonalpyn
- Ki Ki Park, Ki Ki
- Meningie Lions Jubilee Park, Meningie
- Meningie Oval, Meningie
- Narrung Narrows Park, Narrung
- Pangarinda Arboretum, Wellington
- Peake Oval, Peake
- Peake Pollys Well, Peake
- Point Malcolm Lighthouse, Narrung
- Rogers Park, Tailem Ben
- Tailem Bend BMX Track, Tailem Bend
- Tailem Bend Freds Landing, Tailem Bend
- Tailem Bend Highway Park, Tailem Bend
- Tailem Bend Playground, Tailem Bend
- Tailem Bend Riverfront Reserve, Tailem Bend
- Tailem Bend RSL War Memorial Park, Tailem Bend
- Tintinara Apex Park, Tintinara
- Tintinara Oval, Tintinara

== Yorke Mid North ==
The following parks and gardens are located within the following local government areas within the South Australian government region known as the Yorke Mid North - District Council of Barunga West, District Council of Clare and Gilbert Valleys, District Council of the Copper Coast, Regional Council of Goyder, District Council of Mount Remarkable, Northern Areas Council, District Council of Orroroo Carrieton, District Council of Peterborough, Port Pirie Regional Council, Wakefield Regional Council and Yorke Peninsula Council.

=== Barunga West ===
- Bute Wildlife Sanctuary, Railway Terrace Bute
- Port Broughton Foreshore, West Terrace, Port Broughton
- Port Broughton Skate Park, Port Broughton
- Port Broughton Sports and Oval Complex, Port Broughton

=== Clare and Gilbert Valleys ===
- Auburn Recreation Grounds, Auburn
- Clare Oval, Clare
- Manoora Recreation Grounds, Manoora
- Mintaro Oval, Mintaro
- Riverton Oval, Riverton
- Saddleworth Recreation Grounds, Saddleworth
- Tarlee Recreation Grounds, Tarlee
- Watervale Recreation Grounds, Watervale
- Centenary Park, King Street Auburn
- Auburn Oval, Ford Street Auburn
- Catford Park, Caravan Park Main North Road Clare
- Sanders Park, Lennon Street Clare
- Maynard Park, Pioneer Avenue Clare
- Melrose Park (Inchiquin Lake), White Hut Road Clare
- Lions Park, Victoria Road Clare
- Neagles Rock Reserve, Neagles Rock Road Clare
- Hentschke Park, Essington Avenue Clare
- Centenary Park Oval, Weymouth Street, Manoora
- Torr Park, Burra Street Mintaro, Mintaro
- Rhynie Park, Main North Road Rhynie
- Gilbert Lake, Marrabel Road Riverton
- Riverton Recreation Ground, Barrier Highway Riverton
- Winkler Park, Barrier Highway Saddleworth
- Showgrounds, Marrabel Road Saddleworth
- Stockport Oval, Murray Street Stockport
- Tarlee Oval, Main North Road Tarlee
- Watervale Oval, Main North Road Watervale

=== Copper Coast ===
- Victoria Square, Graves Street Kadina
- Hockey Oval, Corner Port Road and Drain Road Kadina
- Newtown Playground, Corner David Street and Lawrence Street Kadina
- Apex Park, Rendell Street Kadina
- Kadina Sports Area, Doswell Terrace Kadina
- Verran Terrace (reserve), Verran Terrace Moonta
- Queen Square, George street Moonta
- Polgreen Park, Moonta Bay Road Moonta
- Car Park Area, Moonta Bay
- Moontana Avenue (reserve), Moonta Bay
- Clayton Drive (reserve), Clayton Drive North Beach
- Oceanview Drive (park), Oceanview Drive North Beach
- North Beach Township Coastal Garden, North Beach
- Dowling Drive, Port Hughes
- South Beach, Port Hughes
- Simms Cove, Port Hughes
- Patricks View, Port Hughes
- Wallaroo Adventure Playground, Irwin Street Wallaroo
- Sincock Square Reserve, Victoria Street Wallaroo
- Davies Square, Wallaroo
- Wildman Street (park), Wallaroo
- John Terrace (park), Wallaroo
- Centenary Park, Wallaroo
- Owen Terrace (park), Wallaroo
- Bews Square Wallaroo
- Jetty Road Wallaroo
- Emu Street Wallaroo
- Errington Street (park), Errington Street Wallaroo
- Heritage Drive Boat Ramp Wallaroo
- Heritage Drive (park), Heritage Drive Wallaroo
- Stately Way Wallaroo Marina Wallaroo
- Abraham Rydeberg Drive (park), Abraham Rydberg Drive Wallaroo

=== Goyder ===
- Booborowie Recreation Ground
- Bower Recreation Reserve
- Burra Gorge
- Burra Sports Complex
- Duncan Park, Farrell Flat
- Eudunda Centenary Gardens
- Eudunda Oval
- Hallett Playground
- McCulloch Park, Whyte Yarcowie
- Pioneer Park, Terowie
- Point Pass Standpipe Reserve
- Robertstown Oval
- Robertstown Playground
- Sir Hubert Wilkins Reserve, Mount Bryan
- Thomas Pickett Reserve

=== Mount Remarkable ===
- Port Germein, Esplanade, Port Germein

=== Northern Areas ===
- Belalie Creek, Jamestown
- Caltowie Playground, Caltowie
- Centenary Park, Spalding
- Couzner Park, Jamestown
- Georgetown Playground, Georgetown
- Jacka Creek Walking Trail, Jamestown
- Main Street Park, Gladstone
- Memorial Park, Jamestown
- North Laura Parklands, Laura
- Robinson Park, Jamestown
- Skatepark, Jamestown
- Tresylva Park, Gladstone

=== Peterborough ===
- Victoria Park, Queen Street Peterborough
- Rotary Park, Main Street Peterborough
- West Park, between Princess and Wright Streets Peterborough
- Off-Leash Dog Park, Telford Ave Peterborough
- Skate Park, Main Street Peterborough

=== Port Pirie ===
- Bowman Park, Crystal Brook -
- Crystal Brook Playground, Crystal Brook
- Skate Park, Crystal Brook
- Smelters Picnic Grounds, Crystal Brook
- Bunyip Park, Koolunga
- White Cliffs Park, Koolunga
- Lawrie Park, Napperby
- Napperby Playground, Napperby
- 4Shore Sk8 Skate Park, Port Pirie
- Arthur Crescent Park, Port Pirie
- Beach Reserve, Port Pirie
- Catherine Commons Park, Port Pirie
- Flinders View Park, Port Pirie
- Frank Green Park, Port Pirie
- Globe Oval, Port Pirie
- Higgins Court, Port Pirie
- Jubilee Park, Port Pirie
- Memorial Oval, Port Pirie
- Memorial Park, Port Pirie
- Pasminco Park, Port Pirie
- Plenty Park Port Pirie
- Princess Park, Port Pirie
- Senate Road Sporting Complex, Port Pirie
- Stanhope Park, Port Pirie
- Threadgold Park, Port Pirie
- Woodward Park, Port Pirie
- Solomontown Beach, Beach Road, Solomontown
- Warnertown Park, Warnertown

== See also ==
- List of Adelaide parks and gardens
- Protected areas of South Australia
