= Douglas Point Conservation Park =

Protected area in South Australia

- IUCN category VI (protected area with sustainable use of natural resources)
- Location within South Australia
- Location: South Australia
- Nearest city: Robe.
- Coordinates: 38°01′26″S 140°34′32″E
- Area: 60 ha (150 acres)
- Established: 8 May 1997
- Governing body: Department for Environment and Water
- Website: Official website

Douglas Point Conservation Park is a protected area in the Australian state of South Australia located in the gazetted locality of Cape Douglas in the state's south east about 29 kilometres (18 miles) south-west of Mount Gambier and about 11 kilometres (6.8 miles) north west of the township of Port MacDonnell. The conservation park was proclaimed under the National Parks and Wildlife Act 1972 in 1997 ‘to protect the endangered plant species, Sand Ixodia’. The conservation park is classified as an IUCN Category VI protected area.
