= Hundred of Kongorong =

- Cadastral division
- Coordinates: 37.923°S 140.532°E
- Country: Australia
- State: South Australia
- Region: Limestone Coast
- LGA(s): District Council of Grant
- Established: June 12, 1862

Area
  - Total: 240 km^{2} (91 sq mi)
- County: County of Grey
- Hundred: Kongorong
Lands administrative divisions around Hundred of Kongorong
Benara	Blanche
Kongorong	MacDonnell

The Hundred of Kongorong is a cadastral division of the County of Grey in southeastern South Australia. It was named on 12 June 1862 after an indigenous phrase thought to mean "the corner of it".

The township of Kongorong is at the heart of the hundred with coastal localities making up the remainder. From northwest to south east these are: Carpenter Rocks, Pelican Point, Blackfellows Caves, Nene Valley, and Cape Douglas.
