= Mount Schank, South Australia =

Mount Schank
- Suburb
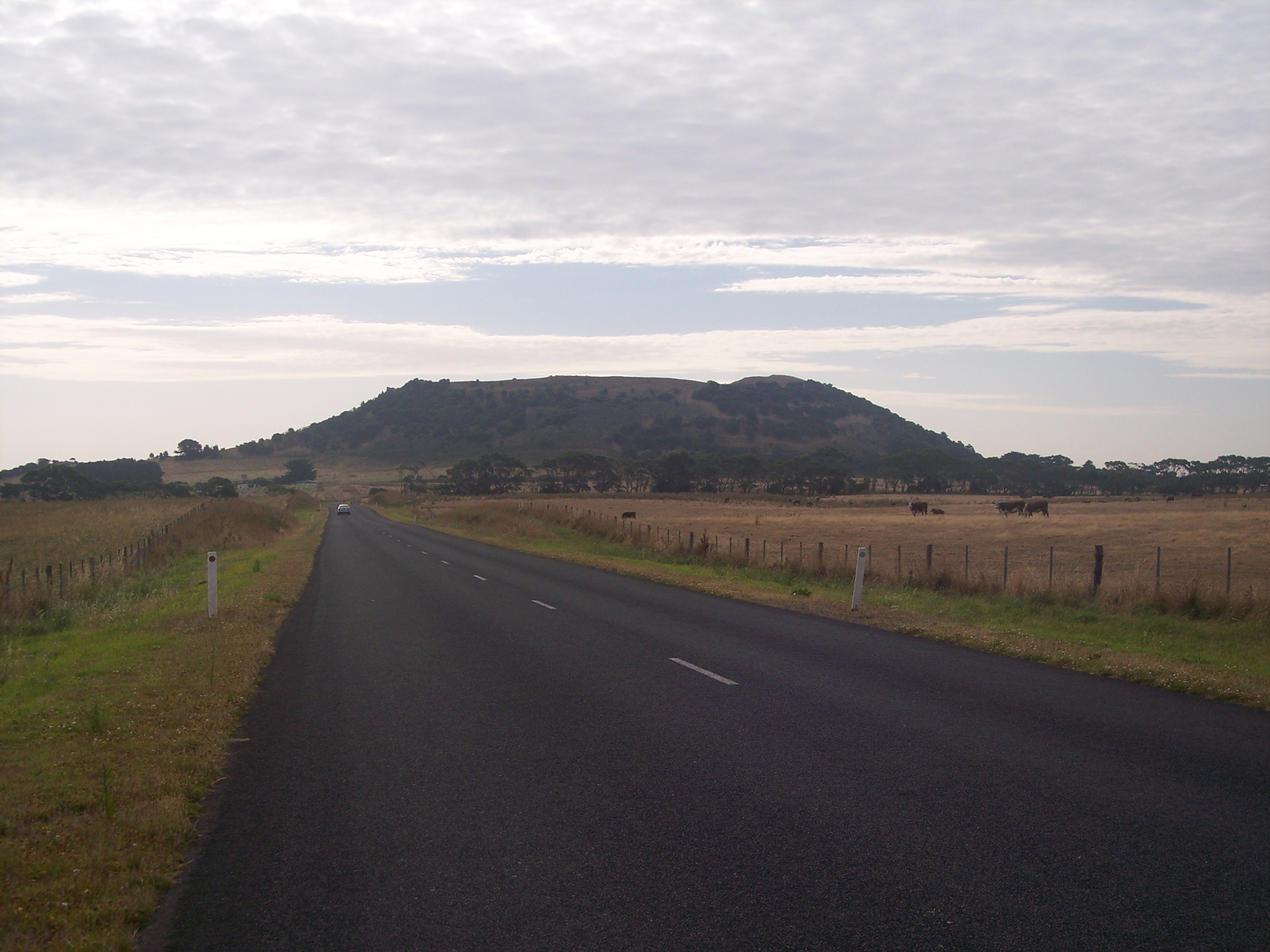
- View of Mount Schank from the road to Port MacDonnell.

- Coordinates: 37.94°S 140.724°E
- Country: Australia
- State: South Australia
- LGA: District Council of Grant
- Location: 385 km (239 mi) south-east of Adelaide; 14 km (8.7 mi) south of Mount Gambier
- Established: 31 October 1996

Government
  - State electorate: Mount Gambier
  - Federal division: Barker

Population
  - Total: 264 (SAL 2021)
- Time zone: UTC+9:30 (ACST)
  - Summer (DST): UTC+10:30 (ACST)
- Postcode: 5291
- Mean max temp: 19.0 °C (66.2 °F)
- Mean min temp: 8.2 °C (46.8 °F)
- Annual rainfall: 708.4 mm (27.89 in)
Suburbs around Mount Schank
Kongorong	Moorak; OB Flat	OB Flat
Kongorong	Mount Schank	Caveton
Cape Douglas	Cape Douglas; Allendale East	Caveton
- Locations; Climate; Adjoining localities

Mount Schank is a locality in the Australian state of South Australia located about 385 kilometres (239 miles) south-east of the state capital of Adelaide and 14 kilometres (8.7 miles) south of the municipal seat of Mount Gambier in the south-east of the state.

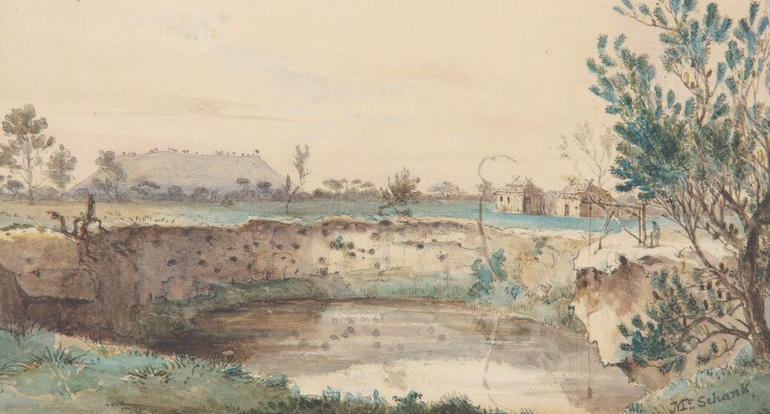
Messers Arthur's sheep station at Mount Schank by George French Angas

British colonisation of the area began in 1842 when brothers Edward and Fortescue Arthur (sons of Sir George Arthur) established the Mount Schank Station. The Arthur brothers were in continuous conflict with the local Bungandidj people from the time of their arrival. Many of their shepherds absconded, horses were speared and hundreds of their sheep were taken. The brothers had to do much of the shepherding work themselves and often engaged in close combat with "the Blacks". On one occasion Fortescue was slightly wounded after being speared. After capturing and chaining up a Bungandidj man, Edward forced him to reveal the location of their camp. An armed group of settlers was then organised by Edward and the Aboriginal camp was raided and destroyed, with six or eight Bungandidj being killed. The Arthur brothers could not sustain the effort of keeping the sheep station and with ruinous financial losses they sold out to Robert Leake of nearby Glencoe station in 1844.

The Clarke family then owned Mount Schank station for around 140 years before it was bought in 2005 by former chairman of the AFL, Ron Evans. In 2017 the property was valued at around fifty million dollars.

Part of Mount Schank became a private sub-division of land within the cadastral unit of the Hundred of MacDonnell. Boundaries were created on 31 October 1996 for the "long established name".

Mount Schank consists of land adjoining both sides of the Riddoch Highway between Mount Gambier to the north and Port MacDonnell to the south. The locality includes a number of geological features consisting of the dormant volcano, Mount Schank, which is located on the eastern side of the Riddoch Highway and a number of water-filled sinkholes such as the Little Blue Lake located on land to the west of the Riddoch Highway. The majority land use within the locality is agriculture with an area located between the Riddoch highway and the western side of the dormant volcano is zoned for industrial purposes.

The following places within Mount Schank are listed on the South Australian Heritage Register – Mount Salt Limestone Track and Mount Schank state heritage area

Mount Schank is located within the federal division of Barker, the state electoral district of Mount Gambier and the local government area of the District Council of Grant.
