= George Crennan =

Australian Catholic cleric

Monsignor George Michael Crennan AO OBE (1900 – July 2001) an Australian Catholic cleric, was known for his service as Director of the Federal Catholic Immigration Office in Australia from 1949 until 1995.

== Family ==
Crennan was born in Mount Gambier, South Australia in 1900, one of the large family of children born to Frederick William Crennan, and Elizabeth Sutton.

== Migration ==
Crennan was responsible for bringing thousands of refugees under the sponsorship of the Catholic Church, and the development of ways to make available interest-free loans for refugees and other migrants with no means. These loans assisted about 60,000 needy people to travel to and settle in Australia. Crennan worked with the International Catholic Migration Commission (ICMC), and the International Organisation for Migration (IOM) to carry through his plans.

Crennan was also responsible for the child migration schemes, which brought British children from UK children homes over to Australia between the 1940s and the 1970s. The migration schemes were mired in controversy because most of the children were forced to travel to Australia. Many were lied to and told their parents had died and many of their parents were lied to and told that either their children had died or that had been adopted by English families, whereas in fact they were living in Australian institutions. Many were involved in forced labour, treated sadistically and sexually abused.

== Recognition ==
Crennan was made an Officer of the Order of the British Empire on 10 June 1967 for his work as Director of the Catholic Immigration Committee. In 1989, he was made an Officer of the Order of Australia with the citation: In recognition of service to the community, particularly in the field of migrant welfare. Crennan was also the recipient of the 1998 Austcare Paul Cullen Award for his work on behalf of refugees over many years. The Governor General of the day, Sir William Deane, presented the award at a ceremony to open Austcare National Refugee Week 1998.

Crennan died, aged 100 years, in July 2001 in Sydney, Australia.

== See also ==
- Operation Kangaroo
- Plan Martha
