= Allendale East =

Allendale East South Australia
- Coordinates: 38°00′12″S 140°42′31″E
- Population: 484 (SAL 2021)
- Established: by 1924 (town); 31 October 1996 (locality)
- Postcode(s): 5291
- Time zone: ACST (UTC+9:30)
  - Summer (DST): ACDT (UTC+10:30)
- Location: 391 km (243 mi) SE of Adelaide; 20 km (12 mi) S of Mount Gambier
- LGA(s): District Council of Grant
- Region: Limestone Coast
- County: Grey
- State electorate(s): Mount Gambier
- Federal division(s): Barker
Mean max temp	Mean min temp	Annual rainfall
19.0 °C; 66 °F	8.2 °C; 47 °F	712.4 mm 28 in
Suburbs around Allendale East:
Mount Schank	Mount Schank	Caveton
Cape Douglas	Allendale East	Caveton; Eight Mile Creek
Cape Douglas	Port MacDonnell	Eight Mile Creek
- Footnotes: Locations; Adjoining localities

Allendale East is a town and locality in the Australian state of South Australia located in the state's south-east about 391 kilometres (243 mi) south-east of the state capital of Adelaide and about 20 kilometres (12 mi) south of the municipal seat of Mount Gambier.

Allendale East is located within the federal division of Barker, the state electoral district of Mount Gambier and the local government area of the District Council of Grant.
