= Cast in Blue =

Public sculpture in Mount Gambier, South Australia

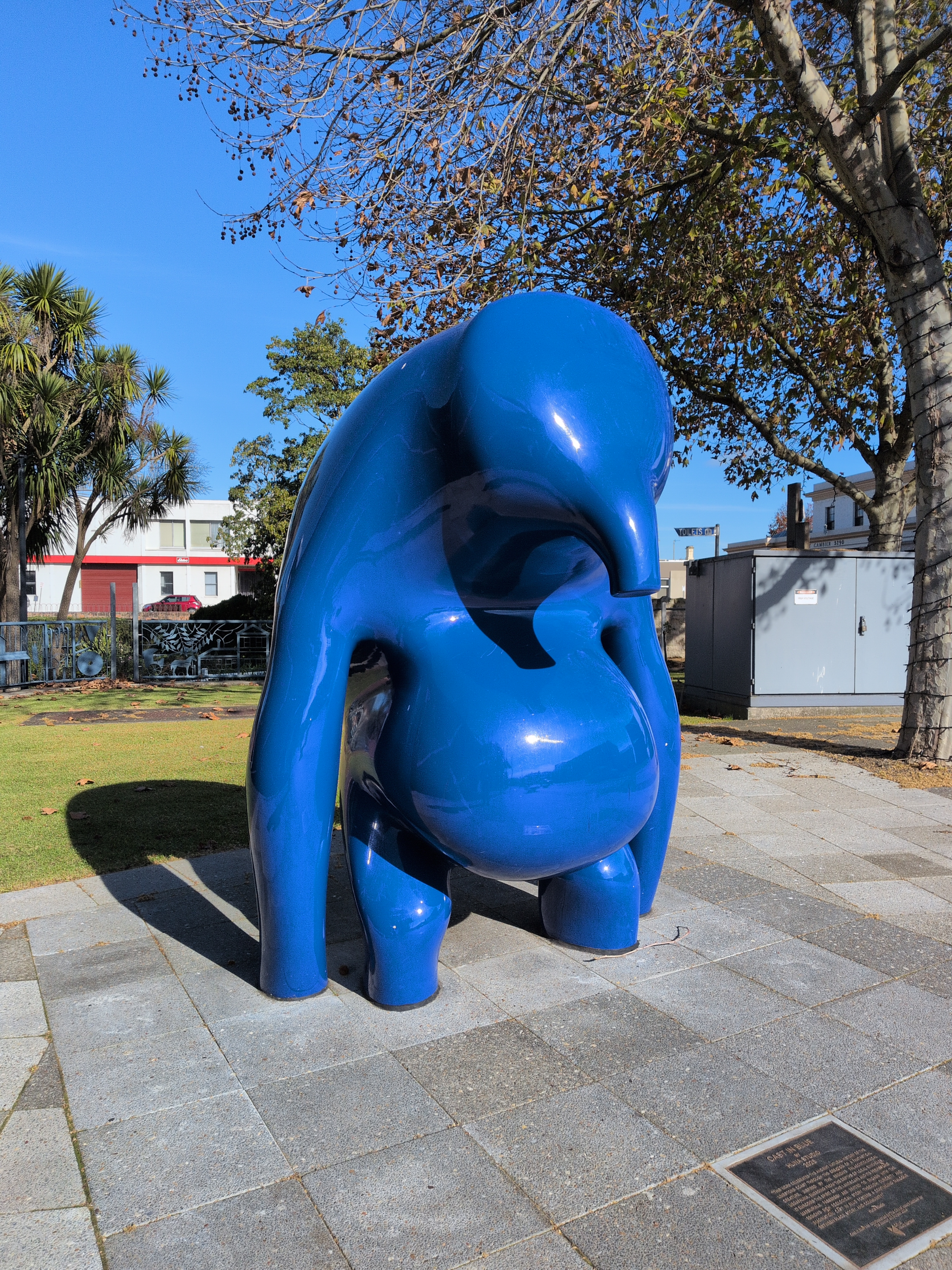
- Cast in Blue in 2026
- Artists: Tom Proctor, Mitch Walker
- Year: 2025
- Medium: Aluminium
- Location: Mount Gambier, South Australia; 37.8288511°S 140.7805946°E

Cast in Blue, colloquially known as the Blue Blob, is a public sculpture located in Mount Gambier, South Australia. Designed by Melburnian architects Tom Proctor and Mitch Walker of Huna Studio, the sculpture is constructed from cast aluminum and coated with blue 2 pack paint.

== Development ==
In April 2024, the City of Mount Gambier began seeking expressions of interest for the Beacon Art Project, a program created with the goal of expressing local culture and increasing tourism to the area. Of the 22 submissions to the project, Huna Studio's Cast in Blue was the proposal selected to be commissioned.

The sculpture is intended to represent a mythical species of megafauna, similar to those seen in the nearby Naracoorte Caves. The distinct blue colour of the sculpture intentionally mirrors that of the nearby Blue Lake.

== Reception ==
The announcement of the sculpture drew significant criticism online; social media users criticised its cost of $136,000, which came the same year as an increase in general rates. Speaking during the sculpture's unveiling, Mount Gambier mayor Lynette Martin said that the cost was worth the visitors it would bring to the area.

Di Ind, chairperson of the Mount Gambier and District Residents and Ratepayers Association, recognised the project's appeal, but opposed the expense, as it came during a time when many residents were struggling with the cost of living.

== Incidents ==
=== Chipped paint ===
Approximately two weeks after the installation of Cast in Blue, multiple chunks of paint were chipped off of the sculpture. CCTV footage of the incident was provided to police, though no charges were filed.

=== Application of googly eyes ===
On 13 September 2025, a pair of googly eyes were affixed to the sculpture by a local teenager. The council claimed on 15 September that the adhesive could not be removed from the sculpture without causing damage to its surface, and that it would be seeking costs from the person responsible.

The person responsible was convicted of marking graffiti in March 2026, and ordered to pay $2000 to the city council and complete 60 hours of community service.
