= Little Blue Lake =

Flooded sinkhole dive site in South Australia

- Baby Blue, 5L9
- Location within South Australia
- Location: Mount Salt Road, Mount Schank South Australia, 5291, Australia
- Coordinates: 37°55′45″S 140°40′42″E
- Depth: 45 metres (148 feet)
- Geology: Miocene limestone
- Difficulty: Above water - no stated difficulty Underwater - CDAA Deep Cavern grade
- Hazards: Deep freshwater
- Access: Above water - public (no disabled access). Underwater - CDAA members only - often poor underwater visibility and silting.
- Visitors: Yes
- Cave survey: Lewis, Reardon, Stace and Horne, 1980; CDAA, 1990s

Little Blue Lake is a water-filled sinkhole (“cenote”) in the Australian state of South Australia, in the state's south-east in the locality of Mount Schank about 20 kilometres (12 mi) south of the municipal seat of Mount Gambier. It is notable locally as a swimming hole and nationally as a cave diving site. It is managed by the District Council of Grant and has been developed as a recreational and tourism venue.

== Naming ==
The sinkhole's name is attributed to its similar appearance to Mount Gambier’s much larger volcanic Blue Lake and the property of its water to sometimes turn blue in colour during summer in a similar manner to the Blue Lake. However in more recent times the sinkhole generally remains green in colour throughout most of the year. This is believed by some to be due to groundwater pollution from agricultural fertilizers increasing the nutrient levels. The lake is also known as Baby Blue and is referenced in caving literature by its Cave Exploration Group of South Australia (CEGSA) Inc. identification number 5L9.

== Description ==
The lake is approximately 20 kilometres (12 mi) south of the City of Mount Gambier, on the north side of Mount Salt Road (near Mount Schank) about 3.5 kilometres (2.2 mi) west of the Riddoch Highway, which is the main road between Mount Gambier and the coastal fishing township of Port MacDonnell. The sinkhole is located on crown land in section 963 in the cadastral unit of the Hundred of MacDonnell.

The sinkhole’s lake has a diameter of about 50 metres (160 ft), with surrounding vertical/undercut cliffs about 8 metres (26 ft) high. Access to the water’s edge is via an artificial cutting on the southern side of the sinkhole and a metal stairway that leads to a small floating pontoon.

The silty bottom of the lake is very flat with an average depth of about 36 metres (118 ft); its shallowest point is around 25 metres (82 ft) at the top of a rubble pile directly beneath the cut access ramp/pontoon, and a dark, silt-prone region extends around the southern/western sides of the sinkhole’s bottom to a maximum recorded depth of just over 42 metres (depending on regional water-table fluctuations).

The underwater visibility is normally poor, but can at times improve at depth and seasonal/longer-term changes in the regional water table can result in high/low variations of around 4 metres (13 ft). A notable feature of the lake is the accumulation of rubbish dumped in the lake over the years including a 1966 Morris 1100, an old petrol bowser, traffic signs and ’witches hats’.

== Geological origins ==
The Little Blue Lake is one of a number of similar landforms occurring in the area to the south of the dormant volcano in Mount Gambier including the area around the dormant volcano at Mount Schank. These cenotes are similar in form as they all have collapse dolines with circular plans, cliffs, lakes filled to the water table, large rubble cones on their floors and clustered together in several groups along in the flat coastal plain composed of a Miocene limestone known as Gambier Limestone. These cenotes differ from other karst landforms in the south east of South Australia by their relative depth (i.e. as deep as 125 metres (410 ft) in one cenote), the absence of any underwater phreatic passages and a different water chemistry. It is theorised that these cenotes were formed by the collapse of large underground water-filled chambers following the lowering of sea levels at the most recent Glacial Maximum about 20,000 years ago. The chambers themselves are likely to have been formed by groundwater acidified by gaseous Carbon Dioxide (CO_{2}) rising up through fractures from the magma chambers during the volcanic eruptions occurring during the Pleistocene and the Holocene rather than by the usual acidification process involving the absorption of atmospheric CO_{2} by water prior to entering the water table. The cenotes then filled with freshwater as the sea level started to rise at about 8,000 years ago. The presence of stromatolites in at least eight cenotes including the Little Blue Lake is suggested as being an indicator of the recent formation of these landforms.

== Exploration ==
Exploration of the lake's underwater environment commenced in the 1950s. The lake’s submerged extent was surveyed by Lewis and Stace in 1980 and by the Cave Divers Association of Australia (CDAA) during the 1990s.

== Present day ==
The lake is a popular venue for swimming and cave diving.

The land which includes the sinkhole was dedicated as a reserve "for the purposes of a Public Pleasure Resort" under the Crown Lands Act 1929 on 19 March 1986 and placed under "the Care, Control and Management" of the former District Council of Port MacDonnell.

The District Council of Grant installed stairs and a floating pontoon in 2002 to improve the lake’s amenity for both residents and visitors after a review of public safety. A parking area also exists on the lake's east side. Diving in the sinkhole is only permitted for cave divers who hold at least the CDAA Deep Cavern grade rating.

== See also ==
- List of sinkholes of Australia – Links to Wikipedia articles on sinkholes, blue holes, dolines, cenotes, and pit caves
- Ice age – Period of long-term reduction in temperature of Earth's surface and atmosphere
