= Racecourse Bay, South Australia =

Racecourse Bay South Australia
- Coordinates: 38°03′18″S 140°45′08″E
- Population: 27 (SAL 2021)
- Established: 1996
- Postcode(s): 5291
- Time zone: ACST (UTC+9:30)
  - Summer (DST): ACST (UTC+10:30)
- Location: 398 km (247 mi) south-east of Adelaide; 25 km (16 mi) south of Mount Gambier
- LGA(s): District Council of Grant
- Region: Limestone Coast
- County: Grey
- State electorate(s): Mount Gambier
- Federal division(s): Barker
Mean max temp	Mean min temp	Annual rainfall
19.0 °C; 66 °F	8.2 °C; 47 °F	708.4 mm 27.9 in
Suburbs around Racecourse Bay:
Port MacDonnell	Port MacDonnell	Port MacDonnell
Port MacDonnell	Racecourse Bay	Port MacDonnell
Ocean	Ocean	Ocean
- Footnotes: Locations; Adjoining localities

Racecourse Bay is a locality in the Australian state of South Australia located on the state’s south-east coast overlooking the body of water known in Australia as the Southern Ocean and by international authorities as the Great Australian Bight. It is about 398 kilometres (247 miles) south-east of the state capital of Adelaide and 25 kilometres (16 miles) south of the municipal seat of Mount Gambier in the south-east of the state.

Racecourse Bay consists of land formerly used as a shack site known as The Racecourse which made part of the locality of Port MacDonnell in 1996. The locality came in existence in 1999 when boundaries were created for land formerly part of the locality of Port MacDonnell. Its name which is reported as being a ‘long established name’ was derived from the bay which it overlooks.

The locality consists of land between the coastline and a road known as Eight Mile Creek Road which runs from the town centre of Port MacDonnell in the west to the boundary between the localities of Eight Mile Creek and Wye in the east. The land use within the locality consists of residential use and conservation.

Racecourse Bay is located within the federal division of Barker, the state electoral district of Mount Gambier and the local government area of the District Council of Grant.
