= OB Flat =

- Suburb
- Interactive map of OB Flat
- Coordinates: 37°53′22″S 140°46′24″E
- Country: Australia
- State: South Australia
- Region: Limestone Coast
- City: Mount Gambier
- LGAs: District Council of Grant; City of Mount Gambier
- Established: 1860

Government
  - State electorate: Mount Gambier
  - Federal division: Barker

Population
  - Total: 470 (SAL 2021)
- Postcode: 5291
- County: Grey
- Mean max temp: 19.0 °C (66.2 °F)
- Mean min temp: 8.2 °C (46.8 °F)
- Annual rainfall: 712.4 mm (28.05 in)
Suburbs around OB Flat
Mount Gambier	Mount Gambier	Mount Gambier
Moorak; Mount Schank	OB Flat	Yahl; Square Mile; Yahl
Mount Schank	Mount Schank; Caveton	Caveton
- Locations; Adjoining localities

OB Flat is a south-eastern suburb of Mount Gambier in South Australia.

The name for this suburb is believed to derive from a herd of cattle bearing the brand "OB" (owned by O. Beswick) which once roamed in the area, and plays host to Generations In Jazz, a national school based band competition hosted in the first weekend of May.

OB Flat is located within the federal division of Barker, the state electoral district of Mount Gambier and the local government areas of the District Council of Grant and the City of Mount Gambier. It is also part of Mount Gambier’s urban sprawl.
