= List of state heritage places in the District Council of Grant =

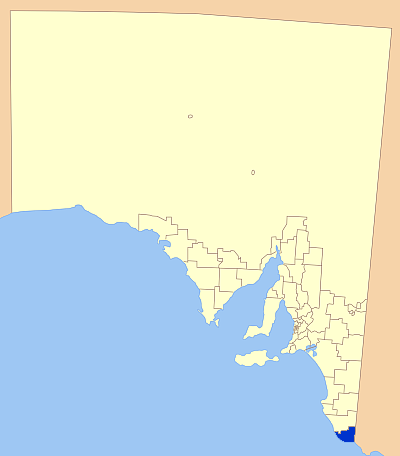
Location of the District Council of Grant in South Australia

List of state heritage places in the District Council of Grant is a list of sites in the Australian state of South Australia known as state heritage places which are listed on the South Australian Heritage Register and are located within the boundaries of the local government area known as District Council of Grant in the state's south east.

== List of state heritage places ==
=== Cape Banks Lighthouse ===
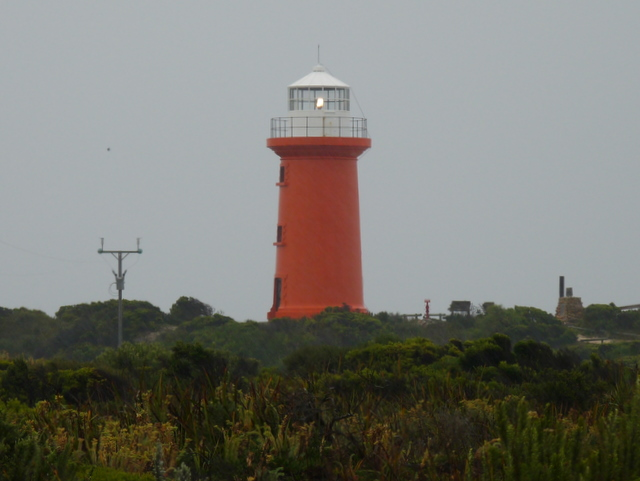
Cape Banks Lighthouse

Cape Banks Lighthouse (37°53′51″S 140°22′35″E) is located in the gazetted locality of Carpenter Rocks within the boundaries of the protected area known as the Canunda National Park. It was added to the state heritage register on 11 November 1999. Its significance is reported as follows:

The Cape Banks Lighthouse is important in the maritime history of South Australia and the establishment of navigation aids during the late 19th century. It represents developments in lighthouse technology and design of the time. The lantern house, re-used from the original Cape Northumberland Lighthouse, is of particular significance as one of only three Deville and Company lanterns remaining in Australia. Like one of the other lanterns (at Cape Borda) the lantern house at Cape Banks is of a distinctive fourteen-sided design. (HSA Assessment Report 1999)

=== Cape Northumberland Lighthouse ===
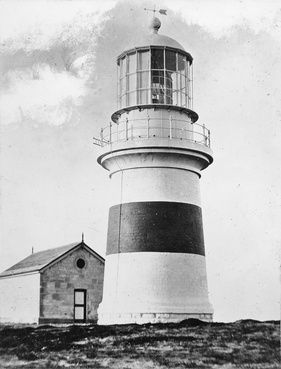
Cape Northumberland lighthouse, State Library of South Australia PRG 280-1-40-198

Cape Northumberland Lighthouse (38°03′23″S 140°40′03″E) is located in the gazetted locality of Port MacDonnell on the headland known as Cape Northumberland. It was added to the state heritage register on 24 July 1980. Its significance is reported in the Australian Heritage Database as follows:

Cape Northumberland Lighthouse, built in 1881, is significant for its association with South Australia's maritime and economic history, and illustrates the colony's dependence on the sea for transportation at this time. There has been a lighthouse at Cape Northumberland since 1857.

=== Coola Shearing Shed ===
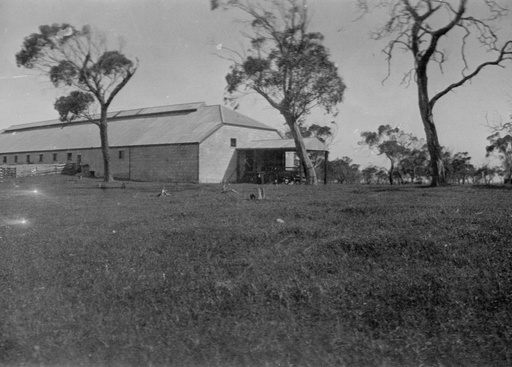
Coola Shearing Shed, State Library of South Australia B 3393

Coola Shearing Shed (37°48′54″S 140°32′19″E) is located in the gazetted locality of German Creek. It was added to the state heritage register on 11 April 1996. Its significance is reported as follows:

'Coola' has been a successful pastoral station for almost 140 years. The shearing shed, built around the turn-of-the-century, is one of the great shearing sheds in the South-East along with 'Mount Schank' and 'Glencoe'. The property of 'Coola' is associated with the South Australian Company and with Captain John Ellis, a prominent early South Australian, and his descendants.

=== Dingley Dell Museum ===
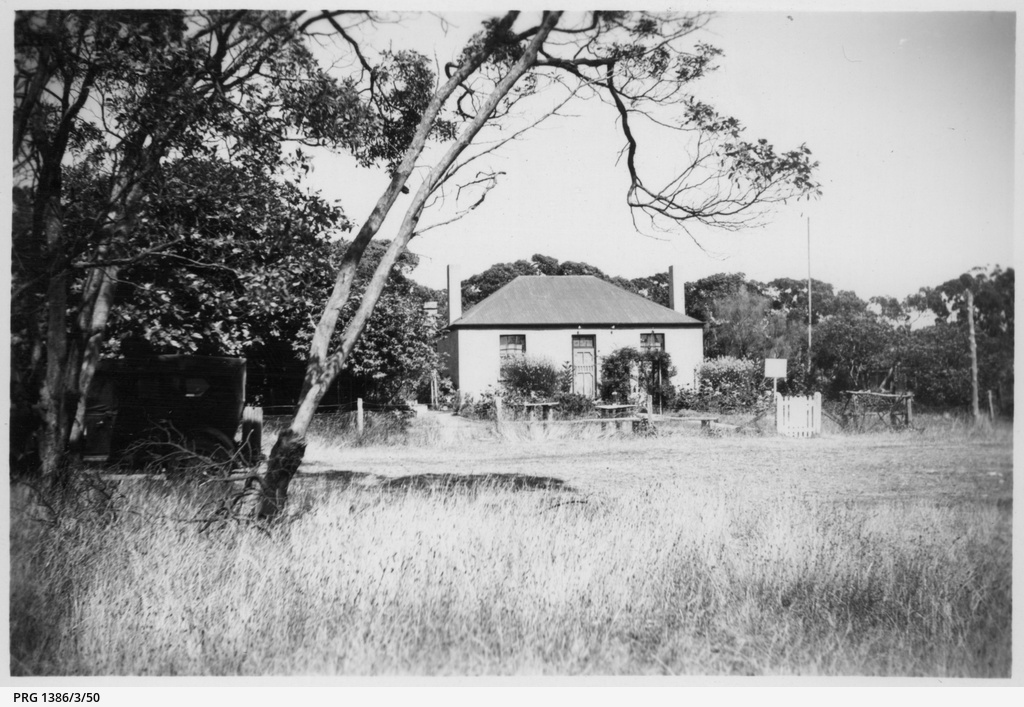
View of Dingley Dell, the home of poet Adam Lindsay Gordon, circa 1950, State Library of South Australia PRG-1386-3-50

Dingley Dell Museum, (38°02′28″S 140°40′46″E), which was the former dwelling of Adam Lindsay Gordon, is located in the gazetted locality of Port MacDonnell within the boundaries of the Dingley Dell Conservation Park. It was added to the state heritage register on 24 July 1980. Its significance is reported as follows:

Dingley Dell was the home of poet, pioneer and horseman Adam Lindsay Gordon (1833-1870) and his wife during 1864-65. Arriving in the South East in 1853, Gordon found the district a rich source of inspiration for his writing. He also gained a reputation as a horse breaker and steeplechase rider - his dangerous leap over a fence on the edge of the Blue Lake at Mount Gambier became the stuff of folklore. Gordon's status is indicated by Dingley Dell being one of the early local museums in the State and the first associated with a notable individual. It was opened in 1922. (HSA, 3/2000)

=== Former Oast House and Attached Stone Building ===
The Former Oast House and Attached Stone Building (37°52′29″S 140°51′00″E) is located in the gazetted locality of Yahl on Caroline Forest Headquarters Road. It was added to the state heritage register on 28 May 1981. It was described in 1984 as follows:

Random rubble stonework with paling extension. Steeply pitched pyramid shaped corrugated galvanized iron roof. Dressed limestone quoins. Basement entered from under side elevation. Lean-to extension on south-east elevation. Hop growing began in the Yahl district in the 1870s and continued with limited success until the early years of this century. This building was also used for church services.

=== Former Port MacDonnell customs house ===
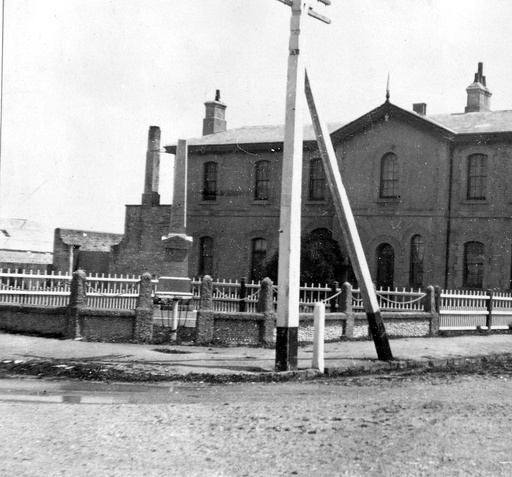
Port MacDonnell customs house, circa 1923, State Library of South Australia PRG 280/1/38/28

The former Port MacDonnell customs house (38°03′14″S 140°42′00″E) is located in the gazetted locality of Port MacDonnell on Charles Street. It was added to the state heritage register on 24 July 1980. Its significance is described in 1983 as follows:

Random coursed stonework with stone quoins and dressed surrounds. Corrugated galvanized iron hipped roof and gables with finials on the two main elevations. String course between storeys. Flattened and semicircular arched double hung sash windows. Doors with semicircular fanlights. Stone chimneys. Symmetrical elevation facing Charles Street. Built as a Customs House, Court House and Telegraph Office. Also housed police and their families; the cells and stables were at the rear.

=== German style cottage ===
The dwelling described as the ‘German style cottage’ (37°51′24″S 140°50′11″E) is located in the gazetted locality of Yahl on Ruwoldt Road. It was added to the state heritage register on 24 July 1980. Its significance is described in 1983 as follows:

Random rubble limestone with steeply pitched corrugated galvanized iron hipped ('German Style') roof and raked verandah. Several extensions built on to the rear and side of house. Double hung sash windows. A relic of German settlement in the Mount Gambier area. Like many other parts of South Australia, Mount Gambier received numerous German settlers, who brought with them their distinctive building styles.

=== Mingbool homestead and stables ===
Mingbool homestead and stables (37°44′54″S 140°51′43″E) is located in the gazetted locality of Mingbool. It was added to the state heritage register on 29 June 1989. Its significance is described in 1983 as follows:

The homestead consists of several sections of different periods. The oldest parts of the house <one being the original kitchen) have painted random rubble stonework. These two sections are well separated and are linked by a weatherboard central section. Corrugated galvanized iron hipped and gabled roof with gablets. Finial to apex of front gable. Stone chimneys. Bay window with dressed stone surrounds to front of main gable. Roof extends into a verandah supported on timber posts. The house has recently been altered and the former drawing room converted into the main bedroom. After many owners the "Mingbool" Station, founded in the early 1840s, was bought in 1877 by Mrs. Joanna Crowe of "Mount Bruce"; it passed from her to her Kirby descendants, who own it to this day.

=== Mount Salt Limestone Track ===
The Mount Salt Limestone Track (37°56′15″S 140°38′47″E) is located in the gazetted locality of Mount Schank adjoining the northern side of McLeans Road. It was added to the state heritage register on 12 August 2015. Its significance is described in 1983 as follows:

The Mount Salt Limestone Track is a rare intact example of a track designed for specific animal-drawn vehicles. There are no known comparable examples in South Australia. The track connected Mount Salt Station with the area's early road network. As with many tracks once in the area, this track originally ran across the ground surface but was later cut through a limestone reef to facilitate efficient and safe travel for people and small loads. The track would have been most important from the 1870s to 1921 as part of a direct route between Mount Salt Station and Mount Schank Station, head station of an enormous pastoral operation. Featuring three linear grooves, the track was designed for use by single animal (or file of animals) drawn cart or buggy. This design is unusual in limiting vehicle types able to use it. The track's design was never updated after 1921, when the State government repurchased most of the land for closer settlement. Intact and largely undisturbed, the track expresses a type of road transport from the era of animal drawn vehicles.

=== Pine Hall ===
The dwelling described as the ‘Pine Hall’ (37°48′09″S 140°47′28″E) is a dwelling located in the gazetted locality of Suttontown. It was added to the state heritage register on 29 June 1989. It was described in 1984 as follows:

White painted rock-faced dolomite and painted Mount Gambier limestone dressings. Corrugated galvanized iron hipped roof with single storey concave verandah. Double hung sash windows. Painted dressed stone chimneys. Verandah supported by tapered masonry columns. The front elevation of 'Pine Hall' is two-storey, symmetrical and is of Georgian proportions. Caleb Fidler (1823-1874) and S.T. Webb began their celebrated general store in 1858 in a tiny building on the corner near where Fidler built this house after the business had prospered. By then the store was at its present site in Commercial Street.

== Citations and references ==
Citations

References

- Danvers Architects (a) (1984), "Part two. 10., D C of Port MacDonnell item identification sheet" (PDF), Heritage survey of the South East: (Region 6 - South Australia), S.A. Department of Environment and Planning
- Danvers Architects (b) (1984), "PART TWO 7. D. C. Mount Gambier Item Identification Sheet" (PDF), Heritage survey of the South East: (Region 6 - South Australia), S.A. Department of Environment and Planning
