= Plan Martha =

Agreement between Spain and Australia

Plan Martha, or el Plan Marta (also known as Martha's Plan, and as Operación Marta) was an informal agreement, signed in 1957, between the Spanish and Australian Governments, designed to bring single, Spanish, Catholic women to Australia as part of Australia's numerous post-World War II immigration initiatives.

== The Plan ==
Due to the lack of a formal diplomatic contact between the two countries, it was an "informal" arrangement. The agreement was facilitated by Monsignor George Crennan the National Director of the Federal Catholic Immigration Committee.

Altogether, the Plan Martha groups "brought about 800 single women to Australia, from 1960 to the end of the scheme [in 1963]".

"The travellers were women who migrated under the belief that they were coming to Australia to work as domestic servants, when in fact they were called on to balance the sexes of the Spanish migrant population. As García explains in his work, the Australian Department of Immigration encouraged male migrants to nominate their single sisters of marriageable age to come to Australia, the purported motive being that some single migrants were even ‘killing themselves because of loneliness and failure to obtain a woman’ (Garcia 2002, p. 104)." — (Ortiz, 2019, p.34.)

== The groups ==
The first Plan Martha group, of 18 young Spanish women, arrived in Melbourne, Victoria, at Melbourne Airport on 10 March 1960.

Seven of the groups arrived in Australia at Melbourne Airport):

- 10 March 1960: 18 young women.
- 10 June 1960: 23 young women.
- 17 December 1960: 23 young women.
- 13 March 1961: 60 young women.
- 14 June 1961: 57 young women.
- 24 June 1961: 64 young women.
- 2 February 1963: 60 young women.

== Fake news ==
GRAPE-PICKERS WORK IN NUDE

MILDURA, Sunday.
Five young married Spanish women, in the nude, have been
picking grapes at a vineyard at Merbein. But the location of the
vineyard has been one of the best-keep secrets of the district
and the women are believed to have left the area.
Merbein Police had heard of the nude grape-pickers but did
not know the whereabouts of the property.
The Commonwealth Employment Service, which brought the
Spanish women to Sunraysia, with other harvest workers, also
heard of the nude grape-pickers but officers did not know
which grower was employing the nudists.
The district employment officer, Mr. Rex Carter, said: "Quite
a few Spaniards came here this season but they were split into
groups.
"Each of the four employment officers in the district shared
in the distribution of the Spaniards," he said.
The Spanish women, working as pickers, came with their
husbands, but the five nudists apparently worked together
on one block and their husbands worked on one or another
of the blocks.
No official report about the nudists has been made to police,
"but we have heard about them", the officer-in-charge of
Merbein Police Station, Sen.-Const. M. O'Donnell, said today.
"It sounded a bit strange to us because we always had the
idea that Spanish women were very modest types", he said.
The Canberra Times, 4 March 1963.

=== The Sydney Sun Herald ===
On Sunday, 3 March 1963, the Sydney Sun-Herald published an (unattributed "fake news") article, entitled "Nude Girls Picking Grapes" — allegedly sourced from Mildura, Victoria on the previous day — that reported that "five young Spanish women have been working in the nude at a vineyard near here to beat the heat".

According to García (2002, p. 71), "there were heated discussions about [the article] after Spanish chaplain Father Benigno Martin gave mass in Albion St., Sydney".

=== The Canberra Times ===
Although not reported in the Victorian press, the article was repeated, with some (very minor) stylistic variations, the next day in The Canberra Times, the newspaper of the nation's capital city (full text at right).

=== Molnar's Cartoon ===
The Merbein matter was the subject of one of Molnar's page two editorial cartoons in the Sydney Morning Herald of 6 March 1963.

=== Spanish Consul-General ===
Noting his concern for "the good name of the women of Spain", the Sydney Morning Herald of 5 March 1963 reported that the Consul-General for Spain in Australia, Mr. José Luis Díaz, had flown to Mildura.

In the company of two Merbein policemen, and having inspected a number of vineyards in the district, Mr. Díaz had found that all of the women involved "had worn plenty of clothes in the traditional Spanish manner" at the time in question, and that he was entirely "convinced [that] the report about the nude Spanish women was not true".

== See also ==
- Operation Kangaroo
- Jesus at the home of Martha and Mary
