= Worrolong, South Australia =

Worrolong
- Suburb
- Interactive map of Worrolong
- Coordinates: 37.81°S 140.85°E
- Country: Australia
- State: South Australia
- City: Mount Gambier
- LGA: District Council of Grant

Government
  - State electorate: Mount Gambier
  - Federal division: Barker

Population
  - Total: 1,293 (SAL 2021)
- Postcode: 5291
Suburbs around Worrolong
	Mil-lel
Suttontown	Worrolong
Mount Gambier	Glenburnie

Worrolong is a north-eastern suburb of Mount Gambier.

Most of the suburb is in the District Council of Grant. A small portion of the southwest including the Mount Gambier Golf Course is in the City of Mount Gambier. The eastern boundary includes a segment of the Glenelg Highway.
