= Kongorong, South Australia =

Kongorong
- Town
- Coordinates: 37°54′00″S 140°33′18″E
- Country: Australia
- State: South Australia
- Region: Limestone Coast
- LGA: District Council of Grant
- Established: 30 March 1922 (town); 31 October 1996 (locality)

Government
  - State electorate: Mount Gambier
  - Federal division: Barker

Population
  - Total: 221 (SAL 2021)
- Postcode: 5291
- County: Grey
- Mean max temp: 19.0 °C (66.2 °F)
- Mean min temp: 8.2 °C (46.8 °F)
- Annual rainfall: 708.4 mm (27.89 in)
Localities around Kongorong
German Creek	German Creek; Burrungule	Compton
Carpenter Rocks	Kongorong	Moorak; Mount Schank
Carpenter Rocks	Blackfellows Caves; Nene Valley	Cape Douglas

Kongorong is a locality in the Australian state of South Australia located southwest of Mount Gambier. It has an Australian rules football team and netball team. Kongorong Primary School had 61 students in 2010.

== History ==
Kongorong was officially named by the South Australian Government on 30 March 1922 for the cadastral land division in which the township lay, the Hundred of Kongorong. Kongorong is thought to mean "the corner of it" in an indigenous language.

== Economy ==
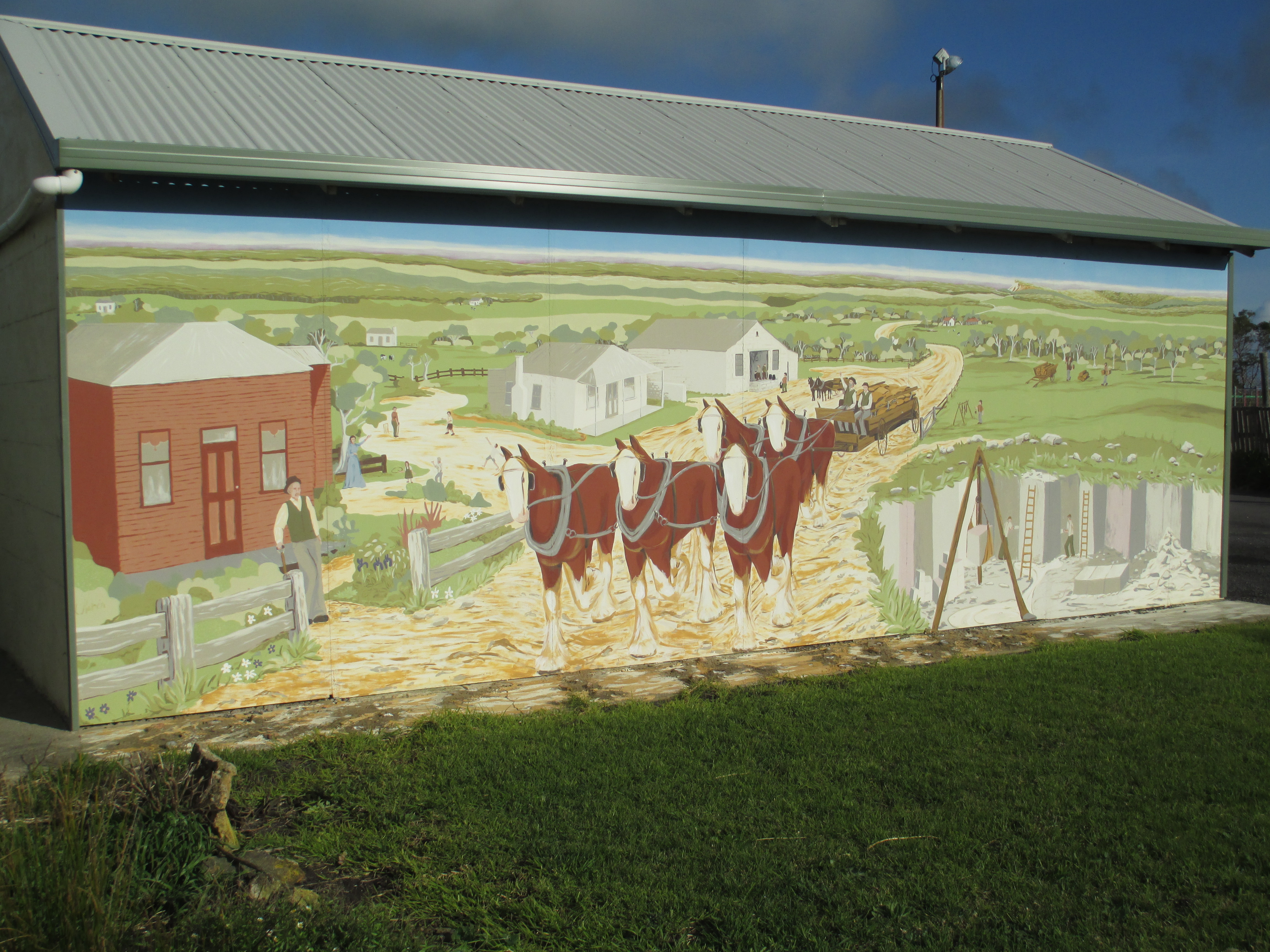
Kongorong mural

Kongorong is a service town for the surrounding community involved in dairy and sheep farming, timber plantations, and grape growing in the Mount Gambier wine region.

== Governance ==
Kongorong is located within the federal division of Barker, the state electoral district of Mount Gambier and the local government area of the District Council of Grant.
