= Cape Douglas, South Australia =

Cape Douglas
- Suburb
- Coordinates: 38°01′23″S 140°35′31″E
- Country: Australia
- State: South Australia
- Region: Limestone Coast
- LGA: District Council of Grant
- Location: 386 km (240 mi) south-east of Adelaide; 24 km (15 mi) south of Mount Gambier

Government
  - State electorate: Mount Gambier
  - Federal division: Barker

Population
  - Total: 68 (SAL 2021)
- Time zone: UTC+9:30 (ACST)
  - Summer (DST): UTC+10:30 (ACST)
- Postcode: 5291
- County: Grey
- Mean max temp: 19.0 °C (66.2 °F)
- Mean min temp: 8.2 °C (46.8 °F)
- Annual rainfall: 708.4 mm (27.89 in)
Suburbs around Cape Douglas
Kongorong	Kongorong; Mount Schank	Mount Schank
Nene Valley	Cape Douglas	Allendale East; Port MacDonnell
Ocean	Ocean	Ocean
- Locations; Climate; Adjoining localities

Cape Douglas is a locality in the Australian state of South Australia located on the state’s south-east coast overlooking the body of water known in Australia as the Southern Ocean. It is about 386 kilometres (240 miles) south-east of the state capital of Adelaide and 24 kilometres (15 miles) south of the municipal seat of Mount Gambier.

Its boundaries were created on 31 October 1996 for the ‘long established name’ which is considered by the relevant government agency as being named after Douglas Point, a coastal feature within the locality’s boundaries and which was renamed as Cape Douglas on 18 January 1996 “to agree with the long established locally used name of the feature.” The following shack sites have been included within the locality - the Cape Douglas Shack Site, also known as the Douglas Point Shack Site, and the Middle Point Shack Site.

Cape Douglas consists of land along the coastline extending from Jones Bay in the west to the Middle Point Headland in the east and including the following features - the Cape Douglas headland and Umpherstone Bay on its eastern side.

The land use within the locality is dominated by agriculture with land adjoining the coastline which includes the protected area known as the Douglas Point Conservation Park being zoned for conservation and an area overlooking Umpherstone Bay being zoned for residential use.

Cape Douglas is located within the federal division of Barker, the state electoral district of Mount Gambier and the local government area of the District Council of Grant.
