= Glenburnie, South Australia =

Glenburnie Mount Gambier, South Australia
- Coordinates: 37°50′27″S 140°51′27″E
- Population: 396 (SAL 2021)
- Established: 1999
- Postcode(s): 5291
- Time zone: ACST (UTC+9:30)
  - Summer (DST): ACST (UTC+10:30)
- Location: 385 km (239 mi) south-east of Adelaide; 9.3 km (6 mi) east of Mount Gambier
- LGA(s): District Council of Grant; City of Mount Gambier
- Region: Limestone Coast
- County: Grey
- State electorate(s): Mount Gambier
- Federal division(s): Barker
Mean max temp	Mean min temp	Annual rainfall
19.0 °C; 66 °F	8.2 °C; 47 °F	710.9 mm 28 in
Suburbs around Glenburnie:
Worrolong	Mil-lel	Strathdownie
Mount Gambier	Glenburnie	Mumbannar
Yahl	Yahl	Caroline
- Footnotes: Locations; Adjoining localities

Glenburnie is an eastern suburb of Mount Gambier.

Its boundaries were created in 1999 for the "long established name" which derives from an early homestead in the area. Its boundaries align in part in the north with the Glenelg Highway, in part to the south with both the Princes Highway and the Mount Gambier-Heywood railway line which closed to freight 11 April 1995 and used for Limestone Coast Railway tourist services to the border until 20 March 1999, and with the state border with Victoria to the east.

The Racecourse known as the Allan Scott Glenburnie Racecourse and the Borderline Speedway are located in Glenburnie. The Mount Gambier Greyhound Racing Club held greyhound racing meetings at the racecourse from 21 July 1979 until November 1996. The Club moved a short distance to the west to a purpose-built complex called the Tara Raceway at 161 Lake Terrace East.

Glenburnie is located within the federal Division of Barker, the state electoral district of Mount Gambier and the local government areas of the District Council of Grant and the City of Mount Gambier. It also part of Mount Gambier's urban sprawl.
