= Moorak, South Australia =

Moorak South Australia
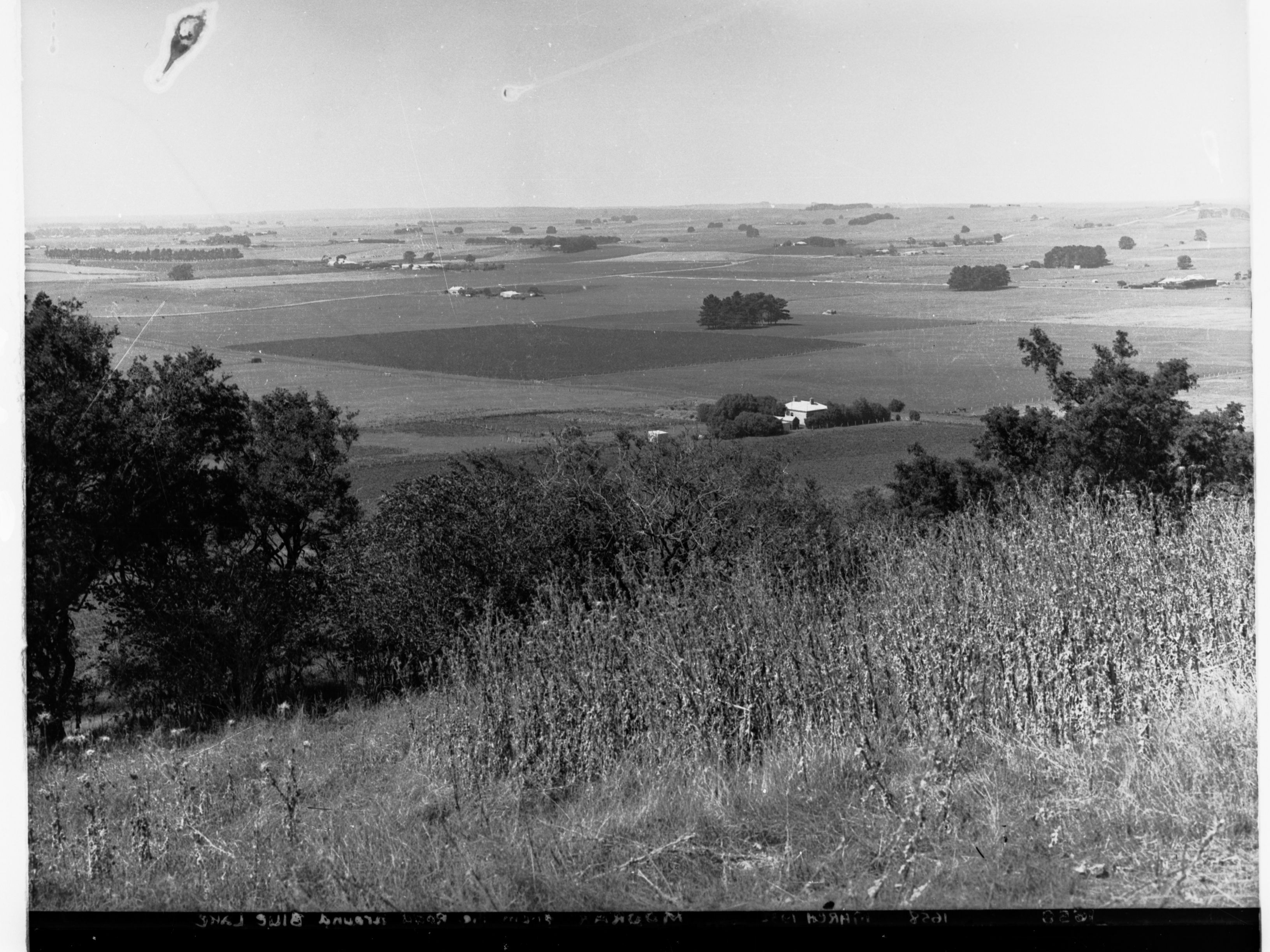
- Moorak from the road around Blue Lake, ca 1932

- Coordinates: 37.8635°S 140.7382°E
- Population: 1,412 (SAL 2021)
- Established: 1999
- Postcode(s): 5291
- LGA(s): District Council of Grant
- Region: Limestone Coast
- County: Grey
- State electorate(s): Mount Gambier
- Federal division(s): Barker
Mean max temp	Mean min temp	Annual rainfall
19.0 °C; 66 °F	8.2 °C; 47 °F	708.4 mm 27.9 in
Localities around Moorak:
Burrungule	Compton; Mount Gambier	Mount Gambier
Kongorong	Moorak	OB Flat
Kongorong	Mount Schank	OB Flat
- Footnotes: Adjoining localities

Moorak is a southern suburb of Mount Gambier – a city in South Australia.

The name Moorak may be a native word for "Mountain", but not from the local tribe, according to Doctor Browne who was an early landowner.

Moorak is located within the federal division of Barker, the state electoral district of Mount Gambier and the local government area of the District Council of Grant. It is also part of Mount Gambier's urban sprawl.

== See also ==
- Kilsby sinkhole
