= Operation Kangaroo =

Operation Kangaroo, or Operación Canguro, was part of an informal immigration initiative — "informal" due to the fact that there were no formal diplomatic relationship between the two countries — that brought male, Spanish, assisted migrants to Australia to work as cane-cutters in North Queensland.

== First contingent ==
The first group arrived in Brisbane, Queensland, in the SS Toscana (Lloyd Triestino Line), on 9 August 1958.

== See also ==
- Plan Martha
