= Southern Limestone Coast Council =

Coordinates: 37°50′00″S 140°47′00″E

- Local government area
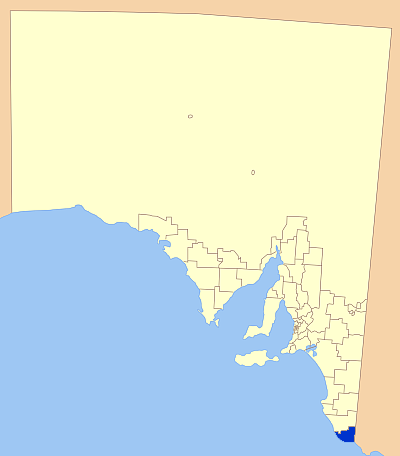
- Location of the Southern Limestone Coast Council

- Interactive map of Southern Limestone Coast Council
- Country: Australia
- State: South Australia
- Region: Limestone Coast
- Established: 1996
- Council seat: Mount Gambier

Government
  - Mayor: Kylie Boston
  - State electorate: Mount Gambier
  - Federal division: Barker

Area The Southern Limestone Coast Council completely surrounds but does not include the City of Mount Gambier.
  - Total: 1,904 km^{2} (735 sq mi)

Population
  - Total: 8,636 (LGA 2021)
- Website: Southern Limestone Coast Council
LGAs around Southern Limestone Coast Council
Wattle Range Council	Wattle Range Council	Glenelg (Vic)
City of Mount Gambier	Southern Limestone Coast Council	Glenelg (Vic)
Southern Ocean	Southern Ocean	Southern Ocean

The Southern Limestone Coast Council is a local government area located in the Limestone Coast region of South Australia, and is the southernmost council in the state.

The council was formed on 1 July 1996 after the amalgamation of the District Council of Mount Gambier and the District Council of Port MacDonnell, and currently surrounds the City of Mount Gambier. The economy of the district is based on agriculture, forestry and fishing.

The council seat and administration offices are outside the council boundaries in Mount Gambier, while it maintains a branch office in Port MacDonnell.

== Geography ==
The council includes the towns and localities of Allendale East, Blackfellows Caves, Canunda, Cape Douglas, Caroline, Carpenter Rocks, Caveton, Compton, Dismal Swamp, Donovans, Eight Mile Creek, German Creek, Kongorong, Mil-Lel, Mingbool, Moorak, Mount Schank, Nene Valley, Pelican Point, Pleasant Park, Port MacDonnell, Racecourse Bay, Square Mile, Tarpeena, Wandilo, Wye and Yahl, and parts of Burrungule, Glenburnie, OB Flat, Suttontown, Tantanoola, Wepar and Worrolong.

== History ==
=== The District Council of Mount Gambier ===
Local government in Mount Gambier was established in 1863, when the District Council of Mount Gambier met for the first time, and Edward Wehl was elected the inaugural chairman. In December 1864 the District Council of Mount Gambier was divided into the District Council of Mount Gambier West (Town Council) and the District Council of Mount Gambier East. In May 1876 another division occurred resulting in the formation of the first town council with John Watson as Mayor.

The three local governments operated independently up until 1932 when the District Council of Mount Gambier West and District Council of Mount Gambier East were merged to once again be united under the banner of the District Council of Mount Gambier. The town council never merged back, instead becoming what is now the City of Mount Gambier.

=== The District Council of Port MacDonnell ===
Land around Port MacDonnell was taken up by pastoralists as early as the 1840s. Settlement started in the 1850s.

By the end of the 1860s there were enough people in town and surrounding smaller settlements to warrant the proclamation of the District Council of Port MacDonnell.

With Port MacDonnell being the second largest port in South Australia, the population held steady until the decision was made not to connect the port to the newly south east railway network. This resulted in loss of trade, and declining populations in the town.

The two councils merged in 1996 to form the District Council of Grant, and was renamed to the Southern Limestone Coast Council on 1 July 2026.

== Economy ==
The economy of the district relies on a range of industries, including agriculture, fishing, forestry and tourism.

Cereal crops and horticulture dominate many agricultural areas in the district, with beef, dairy and sheep production also prominent activities.

The fishing industry in Port MacDonnell is mostly reliant on the rock lobster industry, as well as certain scalefish, and is a significant factor in the economy of the area.

Forestry production and related secondary industries of logging, milling and paper production are major economic and employment generating activities.

Tourists are attracted to the district by natural features such as the coastline, the Canunda National Park and Lake Bonney SE as well as the European heritage making the area a popular and growing tourist destination. A niche tourism activity is cave diving in the water-filled caves and sinkholes present in the council's area as well of those of the City of Mount Gambier and the Wattle Range Council. This activity attracts cave divers from around the globe. Popular sites within the council's area include Ewens Ponds and Piccaninnie Ponds.

During autumn, many visitors also arrive to take advantage of the run of bluefin tuna along the coast, with fish caught out over the edge of the continental shelf.

== Councillors ==
Ward	Councillor	Notes
Mayor	Kylie Boston	
Central	Megan Dukalskis	
Central	Brad Mann	
Central	Katherine Greene	
Central	Bruce Bain	
Central	Gavin Clarke	
Central	Peter Duncan	
Central	Barry Kuhl	
Port MacDonnell	Rodney Virgo	
Tarpeena	Karen Turnbull	

The Southern Limestone Coast Council has a directly elected mayor.

== See also ==
- Mount Gambier Airport
- Little Blue Lake
- List of parks and gardens in rural South Australia
- List of state heritage places in the District Council of Grant
