= Yahl, South Australia =

Yahl
- Town
- Coordinates: 37°52′46″S 140°49′41″E
- Country: Australia
- State: South Australia
- Region: Limestone Coast
- LGA: District Council of Grant
- Location: 383 km (238 mi) SE of Adelaide; 7 km (4.3 mi) SE of Mount Gambier
- Established: 1999

Government
  - State electorate: Mount Gambier
  - Federal division: Barker
- Elevation: 60 m (200 ft)

Population
  - Total: 211 (UCL 2021)
- Postcode: 5291
- County: Grey
- Mean max temp: 19.0 °C (66.2 °F)
- Mean min temp: 8.2 °C (46.8 °F)
- Annual rainfall: 710.9 mm (27.99 in)
Localities around Yahl
| Mount Gambier | Mount Gambier; Glenburnie | Glenburnie |
| OB Flat; Square Mile; OB Flat | Yahl | Glenburnie; Caroline |
| Caveton | Caveton; Caroline | Caroline |
- Locations; Adjoining localities

Yahl is a Hamlet (small township) that is approximately 7 kilometres south east from Mount Gambier.

The area around present day Yahl was originally inhabited by the local Bungandidj people. Yahl is the aboriginal word for "waters, much water".

The following have been listed as state heritage places on the South Australian Heritage Register – the Former Oast House and Attached Stone Building and the German style cottage.

Yahl is located within the federal division of Barker, the state electoral district of Mount Gambier and the local government area of the District Council of Grant.
