= City of Mount Gambier =

Coordinates: 37°49′45″S 140°46′48″E

- Local government area
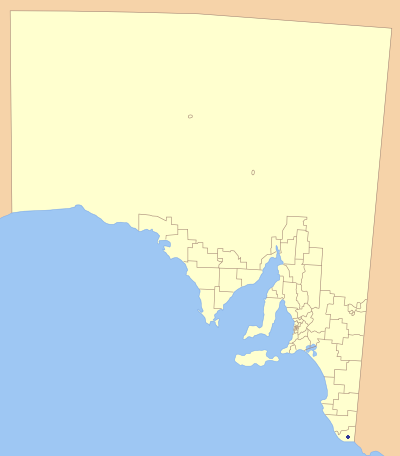
- Location of the City of Mount Gambier in blue

- Interactive map of City of Mount Gambier
- Country: Australia
- State: South Australia
- Region: Limestone Coast
- Established: 1876
- Council seat: Mount Gambier

Government
  - Mayor: Lynette Martin
  - State electorate: Mount Gambier
  - Federal division: Barker

Area
  - Total: 308 km^{2} (119 sq mi)

Population
  - Total: 26,878 (LGA 2021)
  - Density: 87.27/km^{2} (226.0/sq mi)
- Website: City of Mount Gambier
LGAs around City of Mount Gambier
Southern Limestone Coast Council	Southern Limestone Coast Council	Southern Limestone Coast Council
Southern Limestone Coast Council	City of Mount Gambier	Southern Limestone Coast Council
Southern Limestone Coast Council	Southern Limestone Coast Council	Southern Limestone Coast Council

The City of Mount Gambier is a local government area centred in Mount Gambier in the Limestone Coast region of South Australia. While it is the southernmost city council in the state, the Southern Limestone Coast Council is the southernmost council because it completely surrounds but does not include the city of Mount Gambier. It was established on 25 May 1876 as the Corporate Town of Mount Gambier, and became the City of Mount Gambier when it gained city status in 1955.

City of Mount Gambier Council Chambers and offices

The city consists of a mayor and eight councillors, elected equally from the East and West wards once every four years by postal voting. In addition to Mount Gambier itself, the council also includes parts of Glenburnie, OB Flat, Suttontown and Worrolong, all shared with the District Council of Grant. Due to the City being entirely surrounded by the District Council of Grant and the growth of Mount Gambier, there have been ongoing talks of amalgamation, with the most recent boundary changes taking place in 2010.

== Mayors of Mount Gambier ==
- John Watson (1876–1878)
- George Wyatt (1878–1879)
- Robert Anderson (1879–1881)
- Thomas H. Williams (1881–1882)
- Samuel Titus Webb (1882–1883)
- A. F Laurie (1883–1884)
- Lucas Adolphus DeGaris (1935–1937)
- William Ewart Pyne (1937-1939)
- Stanley Charles Davis (1939-1941)
- William Ewart Pyne (1941-1945)
- Stanley Charles Davis (1945-1946)
- William Ewart Pyne (1946–1949)
- John Hugh Marks (1949–1955)
- Stanley Charles Davis (1955–1958)
- John Hugh Marks (1958)
- Stanley Hamilton Elliott (1959–1964)
- Lenora Alice Bishop (1964–1967)
- Stanley Hamilton Elliott (1967–1971)
- Archibald Llewellyn Sealey (1971–1983)
- Francis Newman (Don) McDonnell (1983–2002)
- Steve Perryman (2002–2014)
- Andrew Lee (2014–2018)
- Lynette Martin (2018–present)
