= Port MacDonnell, South Australia =

Port MacDonnell South Australia
- View west to Port Macdonnell from Racecourse Bay, 2013

- Coordinates: 38°03′0″S 140°41′0″E
- Population: 660 (UCL 2021)
- Established: 1860 (town); 31 October 1996 (locality)
- Postcode(s): 5291
- Location: 395 km (245 mi) SE of Adelaide; 26 km (16 mi) S of Mount Gambier; 32 km (20 mi) W of Nelson, Victoria (Vic.)
- LGA(s): District Council of Grant
- Region: Limestone Coast
- County: Grey
- State electorate(s): Mount Gambier
- Federal division(s): Barker
| Mean max temp | Mean min temp | Annual rainfall |
| 19.0 °C; 66 °F | 8.2 °C; 47 °F | 708.4 mm 27.9 in |
Localities around Port MacDonnell:
| Cape Douglas | Allendale East | Eight Mile Creek |
| Cape Douglas | Port MacDonnell | Eight Mile Creek |
| Ocean | Ocean; Racecourse Bay | Ocean |
- Footnotes: Locations; Climate; Adjoining localities

Port MacDonnell, originally known as Ngaranga, is the southernmost town in South Australia. The small port is located in the Limestone Coast region, about 477 kilometres (296 mi) south-east of Adelaide and 28 kilometres (17 mi) south of Mount Gambier, in the District Council of Grant local government area. Once a busy shipping port, the town now relies heavily on its fishing and summer tourism industries, particularly the rock lobster industry, proclaiming itself "Australia's Southern Rock Lobster Capital".

== History ==
The original inhabitants of the area are by the Bungandidj Aboriginal people, who refer to it as Ngaranga, possibly meaning "noisy" or "caves". Their oral history records that dry land previously extended southwards from the current coastline, before it was flooded by rising sea levels.

The first Europeans to see the area were led by explorer Lieutenant James Grant in HMS Lady Nelson on 3 December 1800. In 1860, the area was proclaimed an official port, given a name, and surveyed. It is named after Sir Richard Graves MacDonnell who was Governor of South Australia from 1855 to 1862.

In the 1880s, it was one of Australia's busiest ports, shipping large quantities of wheat and wool to Europe. The port was, however, exposed to the weather and the site of many shipwrecks. Across the border in Portland, Victoria, 85 km southeast, is a much more sheltered port.

The following have been listed as state heritage places on the South Australian Heritage Register: the Cape Northumberland Lighthouse, the Dingley Dell Museum and the Former Port MacDonnell customs house.

== Geography ==
The town of Port MacDonnell is set on flat swampy land in a bay between rocky capes of spectacular wave eroded formations the most spectacular being those to the near west at Cape Northumberland. The harbour is formed by a large artificially constructed rock breakwater, while the coastline consists of sandy beaches, with rock outcrops providing shelter to the port from the rough seas. The rocks provides substantial habitat for the southern rock lobster, the fishing and processing of which is the town's main industry and colonies of little penguin.

== Lighthouse ==
Cape Northumberland has a prominent lighthouse which dates to 1882. An earlier 1858 lighthouse was the first in South Australia, but was demolished after it was in danger of collapse. A monument marks its site.

== Governance ==
Port MacDonnell is located within the federal division of Barker, the state electoral district of Mount Gambier and the local government area of the District Council of Grant.

== Climate ==
Climate data for Port MacDonnell (Cape Northumberland), elevation 5 m (16 ft), (1981–2005 normals, extremes 1957–2005)
| Month | Jan | Feb | Mar | Apr | May | Jun | Jul | Aug | Sep | Oct | Nov | Dec | Year |
|---|---|---|---|---|---|---|---|---|---|---|---|---|---|
| Record high °C (°F) | 42.0 (107.6) | 43.2 (109.8) | 41.4 (106.5) | 34.5 (94.1) | 27.9 (82.2) | 22.3 (72.1) | 21.0 (69.8) | 25.1 (77.2) | 32.3 (90.1) | 33.8 (92.8) | 41.8 (107.2) | 41.2 (106.2) | 43.2 (109.8) |
| Mean daily maximum °C (°F) | 21.9 (71.4) | 22.2 (72.0) | 20.8 (69.4) | 18.9 (66.0) | 16.8 (62.2) | 14.8 (58.6) | 14.2 (57.6) | 14.9 (58.8) | 16.1 (61.0) | 17.7 (63.9) | 19.3 (66.7) | 20.4 (68.7) | 18.2 (64.7) |
| Mean daily minimum °C (°F) | 13.7 (56.7) | 13.9 (57.0) | 12.9 (55.2) | 10.8 (51.4) | 9.2 (48.6) | 7.8 (46.0) | 6.8 (44.2) | 7.2 (45.0) | 8.3 (46.9) | 9.3 (48.7) | 11.0 (51.8) | 12.5 (54.5) | 10.3 (50.5) |
| Record low °C (°F) | 5.1 (41.2) | 5.4 (41.7) | 4.5 (40.1) | 2.4 (36.3) | 1.0 (33.8) | −1.0 (30.2) | −2.4 (27.7) | −1.2 (29.8) | −0.4 (31.3) | 1.5 (34.7) | 1.0 (33.8) | 3.6 (38.5) | −2.4 (27.7) |
| Average precipitation mm (inches) | 30.8 (1.21) | 18.4 (0.72) | 35.9 (1.41) | 45.2 (1.78) | 66.5 (2.62) | 100.5 (3.96) | 96.6 (3.80) | 98.0 (3.86) | 70.4 (2.77) | 47.5 (1.87) | 35.9 (1.41) | 35.8 (1.41) | 681.5 (26.82) |
| Average precipitation days (≥ 0.2 mm) | 9.0 | 7.3 | 10.1 | 13.5 | 17.2 | 21.5 | 21.3 | 21.2 | 17.5 | 15.5 | 11.8 | 10.5 | 176.4 |
| Average afternoon relative humidity (%) | 72 | 72 | 73 | 74 | 77 | 78 | 77 | 74 | 73 | 73 | 72 | 73 | 74 |
Source: Australian Bureau of Meteorology

== See also ==
- Dingley Dell Conservation Park
