= Mount Gambier =

- City
- Main Corner, Commercial Street

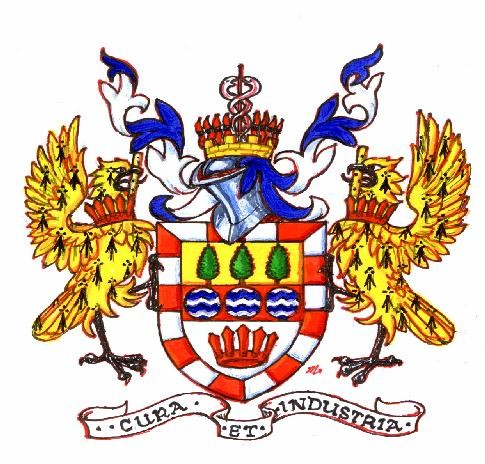
- Seal

- Coordinates: 37°49′46″S 140°46′58″E
- Country: Australia
- State: South Australia
- LGAs: City of Mount Gambier; Southern Limestone Coast Council
- Location: 450 km (280 mi) from Adelaide; 435 km (270 mi) from Melbourne; 300 km (190 mi) from Ballarat; 204 km (127 mi) from Warrnambool; 350 km (220 mi) from Geelong
- Established: 1854

Government
  - State electorate: Mount Gambier
  - Federal division: Barker

Area (2011 urban)
  - Total: 193.3 km^{2} (74.6 sq mi)

Population
  - Total: 26,878 (2021 census)
  - Density: 139.05/km^{2} (360.13/sq mi)
- Time zone: UTC+9:30 (ACST)
  - Summer (DST): UTC+10:30 (ACDT)
- Postcode: 5290, 5291
- County: Grey
- Mean max temp: 19.0 °C (66.2 °F)
- Mean min temp: 8.2 °C (46.8 °F)
- Annual rainfall: 711.1 mm (28.00 in)
Localities around Mount Gambier
Suttontown	Suttontown	Mil-Lel; Worrolong
Compton	Mount Gambier	Glenburnie
Moorak	OB Flat	Yahl; Square Mile

Mount Gambier (/ˈɡæmbiəɹ/ GAM-bee-ər) is the second most populated city in South Australia, with a population of 26,878 as of the 2021 census. The city is located on the slopes of Mount Gambier, a dormant volcano in the south east of the state, about 450 kilometres (280 mi) south-east of the capital Adelaide and just 17 kilometres (11 mi) from the Victorian border. Mount Gambier is the most important settlement in the Limestone Coast region and the seat of government for both the City of Mount Gambier and the District Council of Grant.

The city is well known for its geographical features, particularly its volcanic and limestone features, most notably Blue Lake/Waawor/Warwar, and its parks, gardens, caves and sinkholes.

== History ==
Before British colonisation of South Australia, the Bungandidj (or Buandik/Boandik) people were the original Aboriginal inhabitants of the area. They referred to the peak of the volcanic mountain as 'ereng balam' or 'egree belum', meaning 'home of the eagle hawk', but the mountain itself was called Berrin. A sinkhole in the township was referred to as "thu-ghee".

The peak of the dormant Mount Gambier crater was sighted in 1800 by Lieutenant James Grant from the survey brig, HMS Lady Nelson, and named after Lord James Gambier, Admiral of the Fleet. It was the first place named by the British in what was later to become the colony of South Australia. The peak is marked by Centenary Tower, built in 1901 to commemorate the first sighting by colonists.

In 1839, Stephen Henty, one of the Henty brothers who occupied large landholdings at Portland and Merino, led an overland expedition to explore the Mount Gambier region. He was the first white man to climb the peak and view the blue crater lake.

The Henty brothers subsequently laid claim to Mount Gambier in 1842 and established a sheep station there. Conflict with the local Aboriginal residents quickly ensued that same year with Henty's men shooting a number and burning their corpses. In March 1844, a band of Aboriginal people led by Koort Kirrup took a large number of Henty's sheep. Henty's men pursued and engaged them in a prolonged skirmish which resulted in the colonists having to retreat.

Other British pastoralists and their shepherds in the region were being robbed, speared and murdered by the local Aboriginal population and they proposed to form hunting parties to shoot them indiscriminately. After the Aboriginal population destroyed between 200 and 300 sheep, the Henty brothers were forced to abandon the Mount Gambier property later in 1844 with significant loss of capital.

Evelyn Sturt, the brother of the explorer Charles Sturt soon took up the leasehold, establishing himself at nearby Compton and bringing 500 cattle and 3000 sheep to pasture at Mount Gambier. Sturt claimed he was able to control the Bungandidj people by "a good rifle aimed by a correct eye". In May 1845, seven armed colonists pursued Aboriginal groups after livestock were taken. In late 1845, the first police station at Mount Gambier was formed. In 1846, the South Australian Mounted Police were involved in an affray with the Aboriginal people, shooting one and wounding another two.

In 1847, Aboriginal people speared cattle and threatened to spear Sturt. Subsequently, Corporal McCulloch and his troopers went on a mission to disperse them. In November, two police and three men tracked a group of Aboriginal people who had taken about 300 sheep to the coast. In their attempt to handcuff them, spears were thrown at them, and during the ensuring fight, four were shot dead.

Industries soon began to appear. The Post Office opened on 22 September 1846, an Afro-American named John Byng built the Mount Gambier Hotel in 1847, and Dr Edward Wehl arrived in 1849 to begin a flour-milling operation.

Settlement of Gambierton in 1856 including Mitchell's Hotel

Hastings Cunningham founded "Gambierton" in 1854 by subdividing a block of 77 acres (31 ha). From 1861 to 1878, the Post Office was known by this name before reverting to Mount Gambier. Local government appeared in 1863 when Dr Wehl, who now owned a substantial millhouse on Commercial Road, was elected chairman of the District Council of Mount Gambier. In December 1864, this became the District Council of Mount Gambier West and, at the same time, a separate District Council of Mount Gambier East was formed.

Incorporation in 1876 saw a further division, with the creation of the town council and John Watson elected mayor. Mount Gambier was governed in this fashion until 1932, when the District Council of East and West merged to form a single District Council of Mount Gambier once more.

On 9 December 1954, Mount Gambier was officially declared a city.

As of October 2022, the town had not been officially dual-named, but the lakes and several other culturally significant features of the location were given dual names in February 2022, and dual naming is being planned for the city, mostly likely as Berrin, the name by which it is known to the local Indigenous community.

Historical population
Year	Pop.	±%
1921	3,965	—
1933	5,542	+39.8%
1947	6,771	+22.2%
1954	10,331	+52.6%
1961	15,388	+48.9%
1966	17,251	+12.1%
1971	17,934	+4.0%
1976	19,292	+7.6%
1981	19,880	+3.0%
1986	20,813	+4.7%
1991	21,153	+1.6%
1996	22,037	+4.2%
2001	22,656	+2.8%
2006	23,494	+3.7%
2011	27,756	+18.1%
2016	26,148	−5.8%
2021	26,734	+2.2%
Source: Australian Bureau of Statistics data.

== Geography ==
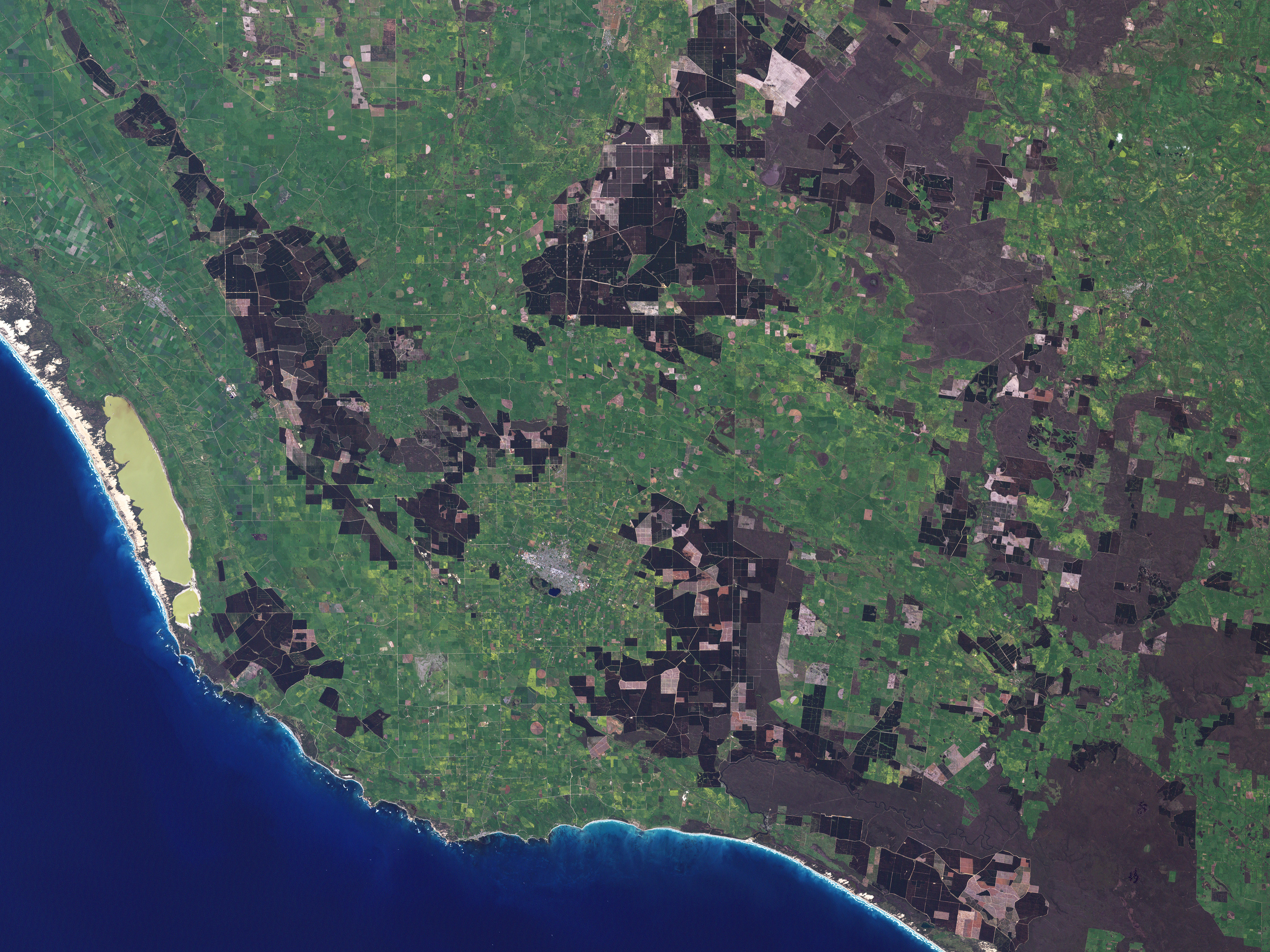
Mount Gambier and region as seen from space

Mount Gambier's urban area is located mainly along the northern slopes and plain of a maar volcano of the same name, Mount Gambier. Comprising several craters, it is part of the Newer Volcanics Province complex of volcanoes. One of these contains a huge lake of high-quality artesian drinking water which changes colour with the seasons. In winter, it is a steel grey and then changes to a spectacular cobalt blue in the summer, giving rise to its name, Blue Lake.

This 75-metre (246 ft) deep lake accommodates a range of unusual aquatic flora and fauna, in particular fields of large stromatolites. There are several other craters in the city including Valley Lake and the Leg of Mutton River. The region surrounding the city includes other volcanic features such as Mount Schank, along with many karst features such as water-filled caves, cenotès and sinkholes.

Mount Gambier's urban area encompasses the City of Mount Gambier and parts of the District Council of Grant. The city's metropolitan area includes the following suburbs: Mount Gambier CBD (inner-city suburb), Suttontown (north-western suburb), Wandilo (north-western suburb), Mil-Lel (northern suburb), Worrolong (north-eastern suburb), Glenburnie (eastern suburb), Yahl (south-eastern suburb), Compton (western suburb), Moorak (southern suburb), Square Mile (south-eastern suburb), and OB Flat (south-eastern suburb).

=== Climate ===
Mount Gambier has a temperate mediterranean climate (Csb), having mild to warm, dry summers with very cool mornings; mild springs and autumns with moderate rainfall; and cool winters with high rainfall. August is the wettest month, with an average of 100.4 mm falling on 21 days; and February normally records the lowest rainfall, with an average of 25.7 mm on 7 days. The highest temperature recorded in Mount Gambier was 45.9 °C on 20 December 2019. The lowest temperature recorded was −3.9 °C on 20 June 1950 and 2 July 1960.

Mount Gambier has only 40.5 clear days on an annual basis. Summer and annual mean temperatures are very cool for the latitude, being exposed to the Roaring Forties. Extreme summer minima near 0 °C (32 °F) are especially of note, as these are unheard-of in northern hemisphere locations at a similar latitude and near the coast at sea level. Snow is very rare in the city with falls in 1951 and 1932. Snow flakes were reported as falling in 1967 and also in 1986, the latter falling as part of the weather system which later brought heavy snow to Hobart.

Climate data for Mount Gambier Aero 37.75°S 140.77°E, elev. 63 m (207 ft) (1991–2020, extremes 1942–2025)
Month	Jan	Feb	Mar	Apr	May	Jun	Jul	Aug	Sep	Oct	Nov	Dec	Year
Record high °C (°F)	44.1 (111.4)	44.9 (112.8)	41.3 (106.3)	35.8 (96.4)	28.5 (83.3)	21.6 (70.9)	22.4 (72.3)	26.6 (79.9)	32.2 (90.0)	34.4 (93.9)	41.2 (106.2)	45.9 (114.6)	45.9 (114.6)
Mean daily maximum °C (°F)	25.9 (78.6)	26.0 (78.8)	23.6 (74.5)	20.0 (68.0)	16.4 (61.5)	14.1 (57.4)	13.5 (56.3)	14.5 (58.1)	16.2 (61.2)	18.7 (65.7)	21.4 (70.5)	23.7 (74.7)	19.5 (67.1)
Daily mean °C (°F)	19.0 (66.2)	19.2 (66.6)	17.3 (63.1)	14.5 (58.1)	12.0 (53.6)	10.1 (50.2)	9.6 (49.3)	10.2 (50.4)	11.5 (52.7)	13.1 (55.6)	15.2 (59.4)	17.1 (62.8)	14.1 (57.3)
Mean daily minimum °C (°F)	12.0 (53.6)	12.3 (54.1)	11.0 (51.8)	9.0 (48.2)	7.6 (45.7)	6.1 (43.0)	5.6 (42.1)	5.9 (42.6)	6.7 (44.1)	7.5 (45.5)	9.0 (48.2)	10.4 (50.7)	8.6 (47.5)
Record low °C (°F)	1.4 (34.5)	2.8 (37.0)	0.0 (32.0)	−1.8 (28.8)	−2.8 (27.0)	−3.9 (25.0)	−3.9 (25.0)	−2.6 (27.3)	−3.4 (25.9)	−1.6 (29.1)	−0.8 (30.6)	1.2 (34.2)	−3.9 (25.0)
Average precipitation mm (inches)	31.2 (1.23)	25.7 (1.01)	34.8 (1.37)	49.7 (1.96)	72.2 (2.84)	91.5 (3.60)	99.3 (3.91)	100.4 (3.95)	75.8 (2.98)	54.2 (2.13)	46.0 (1.81)	40.2 (1.58)	720.7 (28.37)
Average precipitation days (≥ 0.2 mm)	8.1	7.1	11.0	14.1	18.4	20.0	21.7	21.0	19.6	15.4	12.2	11.4	180.0
Average afternoon relative humidity (%)	44	44	47	54	67	73	72	66	63	57	51	47	57
Average dew point °C (°F)	9.1 (48.4)	9.6 (49.3)	8.7 (47.7)	8.0 (46.4)	8.7 (47.7)	7.9 (46.2)	7.1 (44.8)	6.4 (43.5)	7.1 (44.8)	7.4 (45.3)	8.1 (46.6)	8.3 (46.9)	8.0 (46.5)
Mean monthly sunshine hours	282.1	243.0	217.0	171.0	136.4	123.0	136.4	164.3	170.5	220.1	234.0	260.4	2,358.2
Mean daily sunshine hours	9.1	8.6	7.0	5.7	4.4	4.1	4.4	5.5	6.0	7.1	7.8	8.4	6.5
Source: Australian Bureau of Meteorology (sun 1966−2016)

== Governance ==
The City of Mount Gambier Council Chambers and offices

Mount Gambier is the seat of local government for the City of Mount Gambier. The Council Chamber is in the Civic Centre at 10 Watson Terrace. In September 1875 a public meeting was held by ratepayers to discuss the creation of a municipality. The first town council was created on 25 May 1876 with local newspaper editor John Watson elected mayor. In 1932 the Town Council area was enlarged and the two surrounding district councils merged.

A declaration by Governor Sir Robert George on 9 December 1954 announced Mount Gambier was now a city. City status is achieved by reaching a population of 10,000 people. An Act of Parliament in 1953 changed the qualification from 20,000 residents to 10,000 residents. The Town Council of Mount Gambier was assigned the new name The Corporation of the City of Mount Gambier and official celebrations were held on 17 January 1955.

The city consists of a mayor and ten councillors, elected equally from the East and West wards once every four years by postal voting. The Mayor of Mount Gambier council is Lynette Martin. The local government area is situated entirely within the District Council of Grant and due to the city's growth there have been ongoing talks of amalgamation, the most recent boundary changes taking place in 2010.

Law and order for the Limestone Coast region is maintained via the Mount Gambier Police Complex at 42 Bay Road Mount Gambier, the Mount Gambier Magistrates Court at 41 Bay Road Mount Gambier and the Mount Gambier Prison at Moorak south of the city.

In state politics, Mount Gambier is located in the South Australian House of Assembly electoral district of Mount Gambier, which has been held since 2014 by former Liberal Party member Troy Bell, who was re-elected as an independent in the 2018 state election.

Mount Gambier also has two local representatives in the State Parliament's Legislative Council being Liberal Ben Hood and Labor's Clare Scriven.

In federal politics, Mount Gambier is located in the Australian House of Representatives division of Barker, which has been represented by Tony Pasin since 2013. It is a safe Liberal Party of Australia seat.

== Demographics ==
In the 2021 Census, the population of the Mount Gambier census area was 26,878 people, making it the largest urban area in the state outside Adelaide. Approximately 52% of the population were female, 82.8% were Australian born, over 91.5% of residents were Australian citizens and 2.8% were indigenous.

The most popular industries for employment were Log Sawmilling and Timber Dressing (8%), School Education (4.8%) and Retail Trade (3.8%), while the unemployment rate is approx. 7%. The median weekly household income is A$1232 per week.

In the 2021 Census, 52.0% of residents identified themselves as having 'No Religion'. The largest religious denominations represented were Catholics at 14.4%, Anglicans at 6.1%, and Uniting Church at 4.3%.

A 1976 study found that less than 10 per cent (around 160 people) of residents aged over 65 had lived in the area for less than 5 years, leading to a lack of specific aged-care facilities. The same source claimed "The government in the south-east area of the state, consisting of three local councils, amounted to a single administration. In consequence, many residents of Victoria used to look across the border to Mount Gambier as their centre. Consequently, during the 1970s many elderly locals relocated to Victor Harbor and Moonta, both rural areas but with more resources available to cope with an ageing population".

== Economy ==
The economy of Mount Gambier is driven by all three economic sectors, though it has emerged as a regional service economy with its main industry being the service industry and its key areas of business including tourism, hospitality, retail, professional services, government administration and education. The city's historic primary sector roots including mining, agriculture and forestry continue to play a key role as well as being a major road transport and trucking centre.

=== Tourism ===
Mount Gambier is the major service centre for the region known as The Limestone Coast. The area has many natural attractions, including volcanic craters, lakes, limestone caves, sinkholes, underground aquifers and stunning Cenotès, surrounded by a city with a wide range of accommodation, shopping and entertainment opportunities. Tourism generates around $100 million for the Mount Gambier economy. The city is a major accommodation gateway for the region. Major tourism attractions include the Blue Lake/Warwar, the crater lakes, and caves such as Umpherston Sinkhole / Balumbul, Cave Garden / Thugi and Engelbrecht Cave. Engelbrecht Cave is a popular cave diving venue. The region around Mount Gambier also has many water-filled cenotès, caves and sinkholes which attract cave divers from around the world.

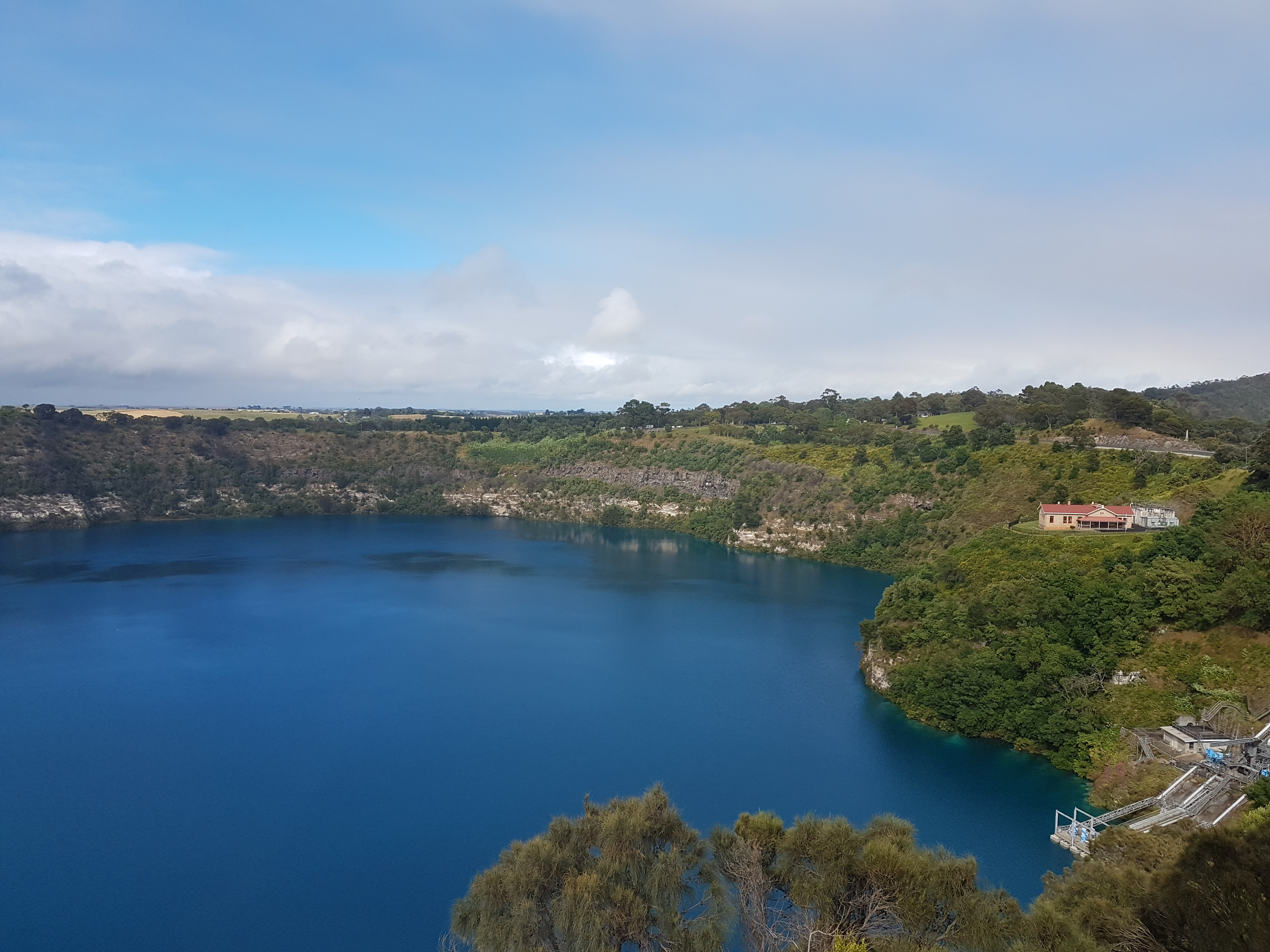
Blue Lake / Warwar

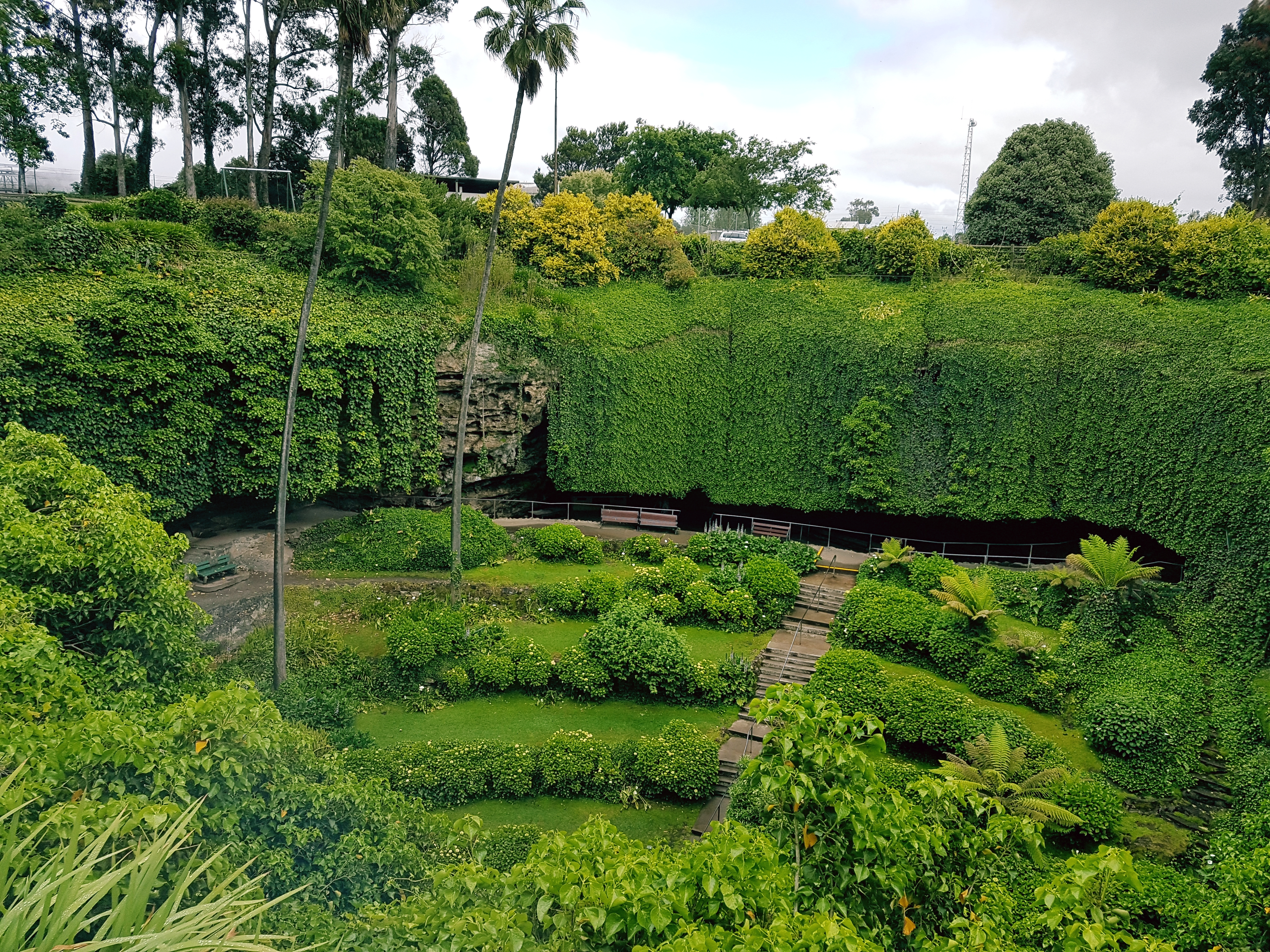
Umpherston Sinkhole / Balumbul

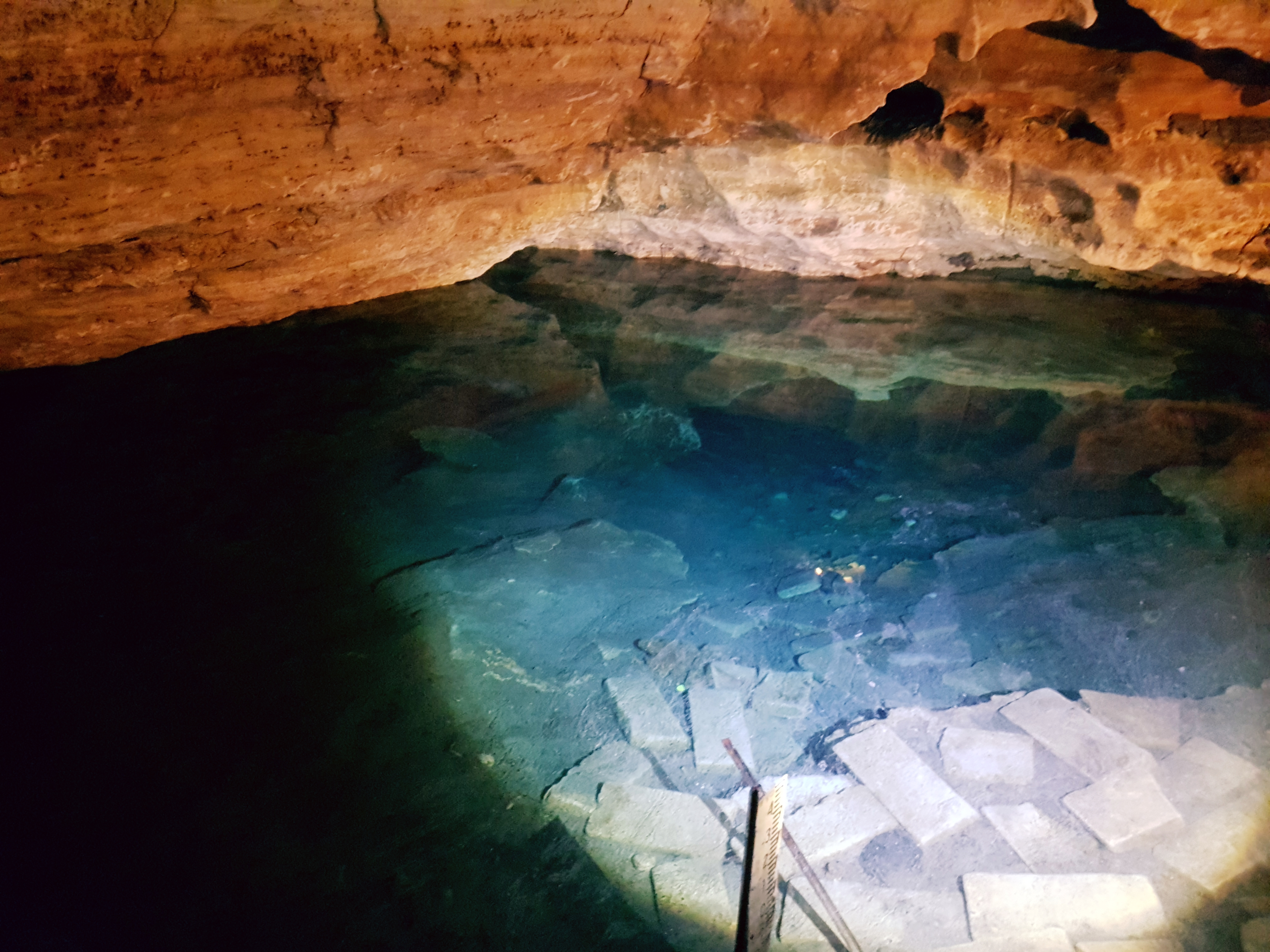
Engelbrecht Cave

=== Service industries ===
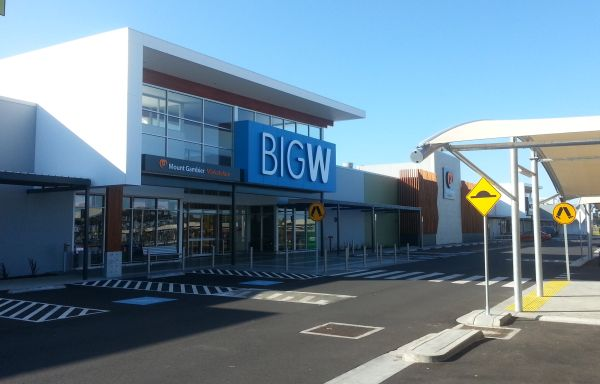
Mount Gambier Marketplace, one of the three major shopping centres in Mount Gambier

As a major service centre for the region, the city has several key retail districts including the Commercial Street CBD. Mount Gambier Marketplace, opened in August 2012, is one of three major shopping centres in the city, the other two being Mount Gambier Central (formerly known as Centro Mount Gambier) and Coles shopping complex on Ferrers Street, which was opened in December 2020.

== Arts and culture ==
Main Corner and former town hall

The city's civic centre is in the refurbished and extended old town hall and Institute buildings. A cinema was operated in the early 1950s in this building by D. Clifford Theatres.

Located around Cave Gardens, is the hub of the city's arts and includes the Riddoch Art Gallery, South Australia's major regional art gallery. It also houses the University of South Australia's James Morrison Academy. The complex was extended in 2011 to include "The Main Corner", a modern building which includes a theatre. Nearby are the public library, a cafe next to the library and the old post office.

=== Music ===
Every year the town and the surrounding area, hosts nearly 7,000 secondary school musicians for the Generations in Jazz Festival. Jazz artists like James Morrison, Ross Irwin, and Graeme Lyall travel to perform and adjudicate the stage band competition. Special guests have included Gordon Goodwin and his Big Phat Band, Whycliffe Gordon and recently (2017) the Adelaide Symphony Orchestra.

=== Sculpture ===
In 2024, the city council commissioned the sculpture Cast in Blue, installed adjacent to the Cave Garden in July 2025. Locally known as the "Blue Blob", and said to represent a prehistoric fossil, it was criticised for its cost of $135,000, but has become a tourism drawcard.

== Notable buildings ==
=== St Andrew's Church ===
St Andrew's Presbyterian Church was built in 1871 in Gothic Revival style. Its spire has been rebuilt or repaired several times: in 1885, 1897 (after it was damaged in an earthquake), 1928, and again in 1980. The building was renamed St Andrew's Uniting Church after a merger of several denominations, and was inscribed on the South Australian Heritage Register. Owing to the escalating costs of repairs, the church voted in October 2025 to sell the building, and the congregation will worship in another venue from January 2026.

== Media ==
=== Newspapers ===
The local newspaper for Mount Gambier, Limestone Coast and South East region of South Australia is The Border Watch. It is published and available in the local area every Tuesday through Friday (with the exception of some public holidays such as Christmas Day). Daily newspapers from Melbourne (Herald Sun and The Age) and Adelaide (The Advertiser) as well as national newspapers such as The Australian and Australian Financial Review are also available. Some newspapers from nearby towns such as Millicent and Penola, specialty newspapers like the British International Express weekly newspaper, agricultural newspapers such as The Weekly Times newspaper from Victoria and The South Australian Stock Journal (published by Australian Community Media) and The Independent Weekly from Adelaide are also available from local newsagents.

Historically, the town was served by multiple newspapers. Two earlier papers, the biweekly Mount Gambier Standard (3 May 1866 – 1874), and the South Eastern Star (2 October 1877 – 13 October 1930), were taken over by The Border Watch. Another, the South-Eastern Ensign (2 July 1875 – 30 June 1876), was also briefly printed. Later, a free commercial paper, the Exchange (1902 – 8 October 1942) ran in opposition to the Watch, and was published by the Clark family. However, it ceased when the Second World War caused paper restrictions and a decline in advertising.

=== Television ===
- The Australian Broadcasting Corporation (ABC) – ABC, ABC Family/ABC Kids, ABC Entertains, ABC News (digital channels)
- The Special Broadcasting Service (SBS) – SBS, SBS2, SBS World Movies, SBS Food, SBS WorldWatch, NITV (digital channels)
- WIN Television (7, 9 & 10) as SES-8 and MGS-41 – SES-8 relays the programming from Seven Network (Seven SA), Nine Network (Nine SA) & Network 10 (10 SA).
- Foxtel – Subscription Television service Foxtel is also available via satellite.

Channel Nine broadcasts Nine Network programming, Channel Seven broadcast Seven Network programming & WIN Television broadcasts Network 10 programming. The programming schedules for these channels is the same as Channel Nine, Channel Seven and Channel 10 in Adelaide, with local commercials inserted on SDS/RDS and LGS/LRS and some variations for coverage of Australian Football League or National Rugby League matches, state and national news and current affairs programs, some lifestyle and light entertainment shows and infomercials. As of February 2013, there are no local news programs for the Mount Gambier area since the closure of WIN Television's news operation. WIN Television also broadcasts News24 Regional programming, the programming schedule for these multichannel is the same as News24 and Fox Sports News, with local commercials inserted. SES/RTS, since 30 June 2024, took a direct dirty feed of SAS-7 Adelaide, after WIN ended its local advertising agreement with the Seven Network.

On 11 November 2011, WIN Television commenced transmission of the digital TV multi-channels 10 Drama, 10 Comedy, 9Go!, 9Gem, 7two (an acronym of "72") and 7mate for Mount Gambier and the surrounding South East region of South Australia.

Due to the close proximity to the Victoria/South Australia state border, most people in Mount Gambier and some adjacent areas of southeast South Australia can receive television services from Western Victoria. These channels are broadcast from the Mount Dundas transmitter near the town of Cavendish, Victoria. The transmitter site is located approximately 100 kilometres northeast of Mount Gambier and broadcasts all the television channels from Western Victoria including Seven Regional Victoria (AMV), WIN Television's Nine Victoria (VTV), Network 10 (BCV), the ABC and SBS Victorian services, as well as the digital free-to-air multi-channels that are also now available from the Mount Burr transmitter, north west of Mount Gambier.

As of 16 June 2025, reception of Western Victoria (Ballarat) TV services from Mount Dundas will be the only way Mount Gambier residents will be able to pick up terrestrial Seven Network broadcasts, after WIN Television announced it would cease local transmissions of its Seven Network services in Mount Gambier and surrounding areas, including Loxton, beginning 1 July 2025.

As of 3 July 2025, WIN Television resumed its local transmission of the Seven Network service into Mount Gambier region.

On 30 June 2026, WIN Television will cease its local transmission of the Network 10 service into Mount Gambier.

=== Radio ===
ABC

- ABC South East SA (1476 AM)
- ABC South East SA (1161 AM, Naracoorte)
- ABC Triple J (102.5 FM)
- ABC Radio National (103.3 FM)
- ABC Classic (104.1 FM)
- ABC NewsRadio (105.7 FM)

Commercial

- Radio TAB
- Triple M Limestone Coast (90.5 FM) (formerly Triple M 963)
- SAFM (96.1 FM) (formerly Hit 96.1)
- 5GTR FM (100.1 FM)
- LIME FM (104.9 FM) (Formerly Rhema FM)

Some ABC radio services can also be received from the nearby town of Naracoorte and from Western Victoria.

== Sport ==
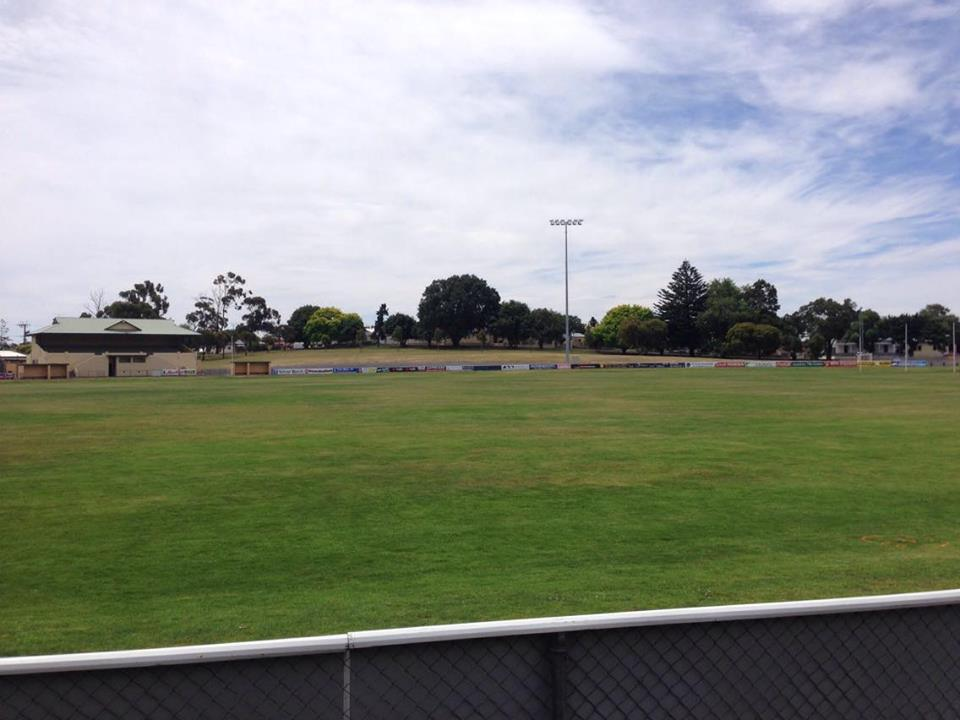
Vansittart Park, home of the North Gambier Football Club

There are four Australian rules football teams competing in the Limestone Coast Football Netball League: North Gambier, East Gambier, South Gambier and West Gambier. They have produced such AFL players as David Marshall, Nick Daffy, Matthew Clarke, Tim O'Brien and Brad Close. Notable AFLW players include: Jenna McCormick.

There is also a range of different sporting leagues and clubs in Mount Gambier and surrounding regions, including soccer, netball, basketball, boxing, jiu-jitsu, tennis, hockey, cricket, swimming, volleyball, cycling, triathlon, rifle, gun and pistol shooting, lawn bowls, ten-pin bowling, angling, archery and golf.

Motor sport is also popular, with the main facilities being the McNamara Park road racing circuit, and the Borderline Speedway, a 372-metre (407 yd) dirt track oval speedway nicknamed "The Bullring". Borderline Speedway hosts an annual Sprintcar event called the "Kings Challenge", first run in 1995 and is held in January each year a week before the Grand Annual Sprintcar Classic in nearby Warrnambool (Victoria), and two weeks before the Australian Sprintcar Championship. Borderline has played host to many Australian and South Australian speedway championships throughout its over 50-year history and is regarded as one of the best run and promoted speedways in Australia. The speedway is currently managed and promoted by former star sprintcar driver, Mount Gambier native Bill Barrows. In 2007, Borderline hosted the fifth and final round of the Australian Solo Championship. The round and the championship was won by Australia's own reigning World Champion Jason Crump.

Mount Gambier is the home of "The Alex Roberts 100 Mile Classic", a cycling event that lays claim to the longest continuing open cycling event in South Australia. The event held annually by the Mount Gambier Cycling Club.

The Mount Gambier Greyhound Racing Club hold greyhound racing meetings at a purpose-built complex called the Tara Raceway, at 161 Lake Terrace East. The Club moved from Glenburnie Racecourse in late 1996 and held its first meeting on Saturday 25 January 1997.

=== Mount Gambier Gift ===
The 120m Mount Gambier Gift was held annually on the first Saturday in December at Vansittart Oval was the 2nd richest professional footrace in South Australia. Resurrected in 2001 the athletic carnival includes races from 70m to 1600m and attracts athletes from all over Australia, mostly from South Australia and Victoria. Of the eleven Mount Gambier athletic carnivals held to date, three Victorians have won the 120 m Gift. On 3 December 2011, 21-year-old Wallace Long-Scafidi won the Gift for the second year in a row. The race has not been held since 2012, and to this date continues to go unheld.

Active sports teams in Mount Gambier
Club	League	Sport	Venue	Established
Apollo FC	LCFA	Soccer	Hastings Cunningham Reserve	1970
Blue Lake Rangers FC	LCFA	Soccer	Malseed Park	1956
Blue Lake Knights	Greater Western Premiership	Rugby League	Apollo Soccer Ground	2017
East Gambier Football Club	LCFNL	Australian Rules Football	McDonald Park	1938
Gambier Centrals FC	LCFA	Soccer	Bishop Road	1961
International FC	LCFA	Soccer	Casadio Park	1958
Mount Gambier Pioneers	NBL1 South	Basketball	Wulanda Recreation and Convention Centre	1988
North Gambier Football Club	LCFNL	Australian Rules Football	Vansittart Park	1926
South Gambier Football Club	LCFNL	Australian Rules Football	Blue Lake Sports Park	1926
West Gambier Football Club	LCFNL	Australian Rules Football	Malseed Park	1938

== Infrastructure ==
=== Health ===
The city has a major regional hospital, Mount Gambier Hospital out of which operates the Mount Gambier and Districts Health Service. A Medicare Urgent Care Clinic opened in November 2023 at 13 Crouch Street South offering Bulk-billed urgent but not life-threatening health care. The 20-bed Mount Gambier Private Hospital was dissolved in 2021 and was transitioned into the public system where it was co-located.

=== Education ===
There are six Reception to Year 6 (R-6) Primary schools:

- Reidy Park Primary School;
- McDonald Park;
- Compton Primary School;
- Melaleuca Park;
- Mulga Street Primary School;
- Mount Gambier North Primary School.

There are two Reception to Year 12 (R–12) colleges:

- Tenison Woods College
- St Martins Lutheran College.

There are two high schools for Year 7 to 12:

- Mount Gambier High School
- Grant High School.

Post-secondary education is offered by the following providers:

- TAFE South Australia has a campus in Mount Gambier providing an extensive variety of vocational study.
- University of South Australia has a modern, state of the art campus in Mount Gambier which offers full-time or part-time undergraduate degrees in education, Nursing, Midwifery and Social Work with enabling courses in Foundation Studies and Aboriginal Pathways Program also offered.
- Flinders University also operates Flinders Rural Health SA in the grounds of Mount Gambier Hospital.

== Transport ==
Mount Gambier sits on a number of highways which connect the city to other major towns in the region, as well as to Adelaide and Melbourne.

- Princes Highway (Jubilee Highway) travels through the city east to west.
  - to Melbourne via Dartmoor, Portland, Port Fairy, Warrnambool, Colac and Geelong
  - to Adelaide via Millicent, Kingston SE and Meningie
- Riddoch Highway (Penola Road / Bay Road) travels through the city north to south.
  - to Adelaide via Penola, Naracoorte and Keith
  - to Port Macdonnell
- Glenelg Highway terminates just east of the city in Glenburnie.
  - to Ballarat via Casterton, Hamilton and Skipton
- Glenelg River Road terminates just east of the city at the Princes Highway.
  - alternative route to Portland via Wye, Donovans and Nelson

Before conversion of the Adelaide–Wolseley railway line to standard gauge in 1995, Mount Gambier was connected to Adelaide on the broad gauge network via Naracoorte, Bordertown and Tailem Bend. Normal commercial passenger services to Adelaide ceased on 31 December 1990, while limited freight services operated until the line was disconnected from the national network on 12 April 1995. Limestone Coast Railway operated tourist trains to Coonawarra, Penola, Millicent, Tantanoola and Rennick until it ceased on 28 June 2006. In 2015, the former railyards were removed and converted into a park.

Mount Gambier Airport is located a few kilometres north of the city via the Riddoch Highway. The city is served by Rex Airlines, which flies Saab 340 aircraft to Adelaide and Melbourne up to three times per day. Since March 2021, Qantas operates one daily flight to and from Adelaide and Melbourne using De Havilland Canada Dash 8 aircraft in QantasLink livery.

Stateliner operate coach services to Mount Gambier from Adelaide. V/Line operates a daily interstate coach service from Mount Gambier to Warrnambool, connecting with a rail service to Melbourne.

== Notable people ==
- Kai Allen (born there in 2005), racing driver
- Kasey Chambers, (born there in 1976)
- George Crennan, Director of the Federal Catholic Immigration Office in Australia from 1949 until 1995
- Gavin Wanganeen, (AFL Footballer) (born there in 1973)
- Elizabeth Grant, (born there in 1963 and lived there until 1980).
- Dave Graney, (born there in 1959 and lived there until 1978)
- Philip Kennedy (bishop) (born 1930 in Gambier, died 1983), Catholic auxiliary bishop of Adelaide
- Mark Yeates, (AFL Footballer) (born there 1960)
- Robert Helpmann (Sir) (1909–1986)
- David Marshall, (Australian footballer with the Adelaide Crows in the AFL, Glenelg in the SANFL, North Gambier in the WBFL)
- Tony Pasin, politician
- Allan Scott, businessman
- James Stein, pioneer overlander and pastoralist, died and buried there in 1877.
- John Tremelling, sports shooter.
- Josip Skoko, Socceroo – 51 Caps.
- William Paltridge, politician.
- Matthew Clarke, Australian Footballer
- Nick Daffy, Australian Footballer
- Lucas Herbert, Australian Footballer
- Simon Feast, Australian Footballer
- Gary Lazarus, Australian Footballer
- Tim O'Brien, Australian Footballer
- Brad Close, Australian Footballer
- Ben Hood, politician
- Adam Lindsay Gordon, Poet
- James Umpherston, Politician
- Oswald Rishbeth, Professor
- Louise Adams, Singer
- Eoin Cameron, Radio Personality
- Bill Nankivell, Politician
