= 1973 Mount Gambier cave diving accident =

Scuba cave diving incident in South Australia

Mount Gambier cave diving accident
- Date: 28 May 1973
- Time: ~1:30 pm
- Location: The Shaft (sinkhole near Mount Gambier, South Australia)
- Cause: Lost exploring cave
- Participants: John H. Bockerman; Peter S. Burr; Christine M. Millott; Glen Millott; Stephen L. Millott; Larry Reynolds; Gordon G. Roberts; Robert J. Smith; Joan Harper (did not dive)
- Outcome: Deaths of Stephen L. and Christine M. Millott, Gordon G. Roberts, and John H. Bockerman

The 1973 Mount Gambier cave diving accident was a scuba diving incident on 28 May 1973 at a flooded sinkhole known as "The Shaft" near Mount Gambier in South Australia. The incident claimed the lives of four recreational scuba divers: siblings Stephen L. and Christine M. Millott, Gordon G. Roberts, and John H. Bockerman. The four divers explored beyond their own planned limits, without the use of a guideline, and subsequently became lost, eventually exhausting their breathing air and drowning, with their bodies all recovered over the next year. To date, they are the only known fatalities at the site. Four other divers from the same group survived.

The incident was influential in the restriction of access to cave diving venues in Australia, the formation of the Cave Divers Association of Australia later that year, and the development of the South Australian Police Underwater Recovery Squad.

== The Shaft ==
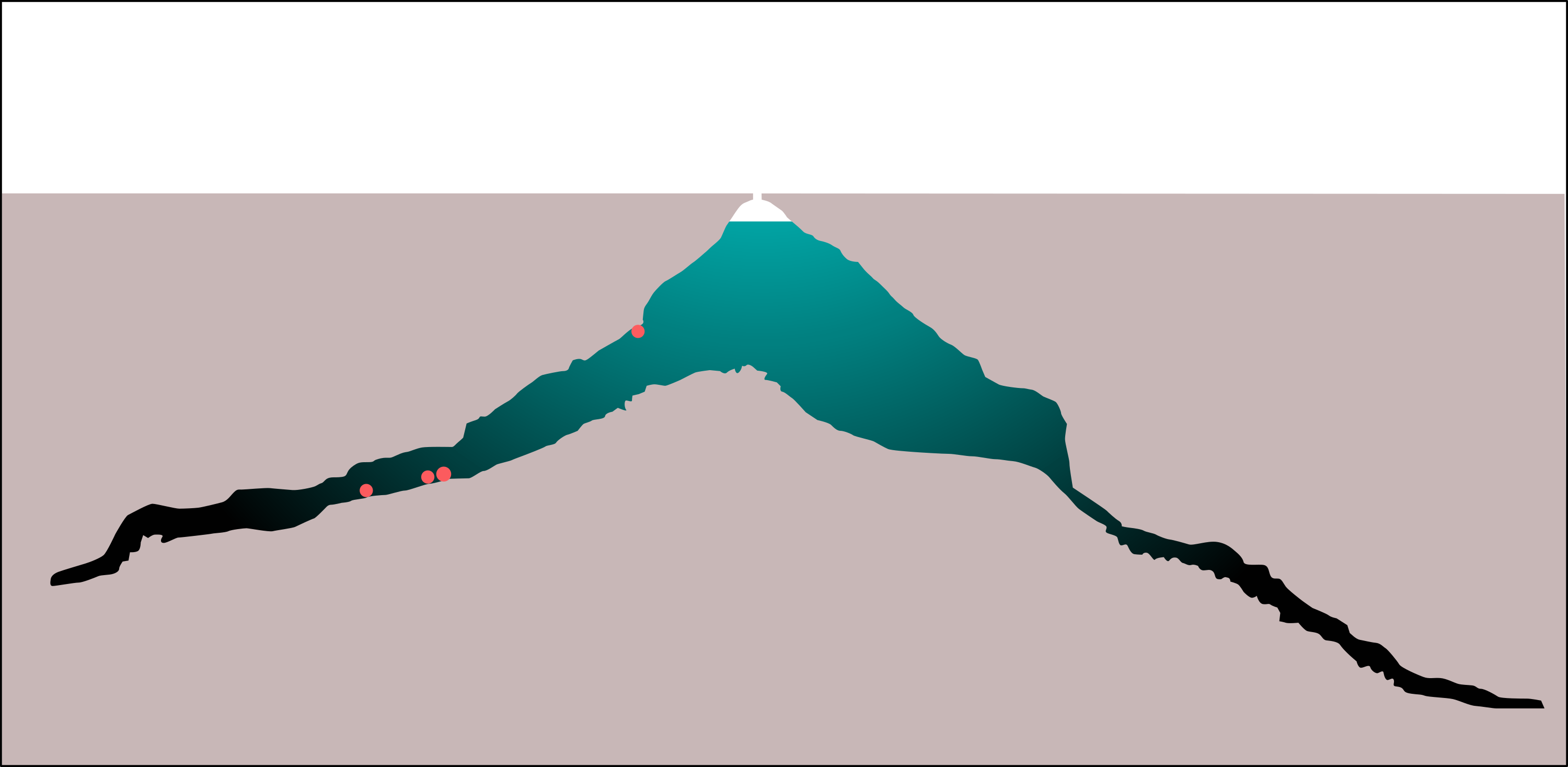
Section through The Shaft. Despite knowing their maximum depths, the total lengths of the northwest and southwest tunnels shown above are unknown.

The entrance to the sinkhole known as "The Shaft" was discovered in 1938 in a field known as Thompson's Paddock, on a farm near Allendale East, a few kilometres south of Mount Gambier, when one of a team of horses stumbled over a small hole about 1 foot (0.30 m) across, which proved to be a solution shaft opening into a large sinkhole. The hole was later opened up to about 1 metre (3.3 ft) diameter for exploration access. In the mid-1960s a local diver climbed down the rain-enlarged 0.8 metres (2.6 ft) opening into the cave’s 17-metre (56 ft) wide lake chamber and made the first descent to a depth of about 21 metres (69 ft).

The cave is one of several deep solution features in porous limestone in this part of south Australia. The main chamber is about 140 metres (460 ft) long and 80 metres (260 ft) wide. Water level is about 7 metres (23 ft) below ground level, and the hole is considerably wider at this point. A rock pile directly under the surface opening rises to a minimum depth of about 36 metres (118 ft). A tunnel extends to the northwest to a depth of about 80 metres (260 ft), and another to the east reaches a maximum depth of 124 metres (407 ft). Because of the size of the hole and the height of the drop, divers and equipment are lowered into the chamber separately using a hoist system.

The name is claimed to be derived from the bright shaft of sunlight which penetrates through the entrance to the depths on a sunny day.

The first reasonably accurate map of the cavern was made in 1984 after the newly formed CDAA Research Group made mapping and photographic dives showing the chamber to be roughly oval in shape. There was another exploration in June 1992, but the deepest sections were surveyed and mapped in 2002/03. The eastern tunnel is obstructed by restrictions at about 57 metres (187 ft) and continues downwards to 124 metres (407 ft) before becoming horizontal, and further access is blocked by a rock pile. Despite knowing their maximum depths, however, the total lengths of the northwest and southwest tunnels are unknown, and they may extend as far as the southern shores as part of the intricate freshwater-drainage system flowing through the mountains in the area.

The Shaft is on private land and is restricted to divers accredited with the CDAA.

== Background ==
On 26 May 1973, a group of nine divers arrived at Mount Gambier in South Australia with the intention of cave diving at "The Shaft," a 3 feet (0.91 m) wide sinkhole opening leading to a large underwater cavern, famous among divers for its clear water and interesting internal structure. John H. Bockerman, Peter S. Burr, Christine M. Millott, Glen Millott, Stephen L. Millott, Larry Reynolds, Gordon G. Roberts, and Robert J. Smith were the eight divers intending to venture into the cave; a ninth group member, Joan Harper, had decided she would not be diving, and would instead remain beside the sinkhole, preparing hot soup and assisting the group in other ways.

The day prior to the accident, the group signed the guestbook at the farmhouse of B.V. Ashby, and completed a successful dive at the sinkhole, extending a shot line approximately 150 feet (46 m) into the water and reaching the primary point of interest known as the "rock pile", a central pile of limestone rubble about 40 meters directly below the sinkhole entrance. They briefly explored the perimeter of the rock pile before surfacing. With their shot line already in place, the group planned to return the next morning and continue exploring the cavern.

The group arrived at the sinkhole on the morning of 28 May after refilling their 72 cubic feet (2.0 m^{3}) cylinders at Mount Gambier, and quickly descended to the rock pile. Reports from the divers indicate that they had not planned to explore beyond "the edge", a narrow and downward-sloping continuation of the cave on one side of the main chamber, far from the natural light shaft provided by the sinkhole opening. The rock pile was generally considered the boundary for safe recreational diving; the surrounding cavern was dark, unexplored, covered in loose silt and limestone rubble, and continued downward to depths where the effects of nitrogen narcosis become extreme if the breathing gas is not diluted by helium. Even at the depths of the rock pile perimeter, the effects of narcosis would have been significant, which may have already been impacting the judgement of the divers.

While the initial descent went smoothly, the eight divers neglected several recognised safety procedures early in the dive. The shot line did not extend all the way to the cavern floor, and was not equipped with extra air tanks, nor were the divers prepared with adequate air management strategies. The group had not established specific diving partners, and they did not use any form of safety guide line; Glen Millott later stated they did not use safety lines because eight separate lines in such a confined space would have created a dangerous situation for the divers. Robert Smith, who had dived at the sinkhole on eight previous occasions and established most of the dive plan, was not expecting the other members of the group to venture as far into the cave as they did.

== Accident ==
Separate accounts from the four surviving divers were pieced together with the help of former Chief Superintendent Wallace B. Budd to establish a timeline of what happened to the four victims. At the perimeter of the rock pile, Smith began to feel the effects of nitrogen narcosis. His depth gauge read approximately 180 feet (55 m). An experienced diver, familiar with the symptoms of narcosis, Smith signaled to his group that he was returning to the top of the rock pile. The group signaled that they were going to continue exploring. Smith stayed by the rock pile, circling it for around 8 minutes while searching for animal bones. He then saw the torch of Glen Millott returning from the direction the others had gone. Glen Millott had been monitoring his air, and knew that he was out of time; he had attempted to tap Christine Millott on the arm and remind her that her time was also up, but the two were separated before he could. Smith and Glen Millott met and surfaced together to find that Larry Reynolds had already returned from his dive. Half a minute later, Peter Burr surfaced with almost no air left in his tank.

Knowing the others would have similarly low air supplies, Glen Millott quickly put on a spare tank and returned to the water. He descended to a depth of 225 feet (69 m), where the cliff began to drop off. At the edge, he found Stephen L. Millott's torch and camera. Significant amounts of silt had been disturbed, and the visibility had been reduced to nearly zero. Glen Millott had no choice but to decompress and return to the surface. By the time he surfaced, an ambulance had arrived at the sinkhole. Peter Burr returned to the cavern for one more look, but found nobody. By that point, the group was aware that they were looking for bodies, and not survivors.

At the end of the planned dive, upon turning around to return to the surface, the surviving divers saw Christine Millott and Gordon Roberts attempt to ascend quickly back to the rock pile. However, instead of ascending along the slope they went down, they swam straight up, possibly because they were worried their air would be exhausted soon. The two divers swam directly upward into a dome in the ceiling which had no exit. Reynolds reported seeing their torches frantically searching for an exit before Roberts signaled back that they were lost. According to Reynolds, Christine Millott and Gordon Roberts looked "frightened." This was the last time the two were seen. Likely suffering from nitrogen narcosis, and surrounded in silt allowing minimal visibility, the two failed to find an exit. They exhausted their air supply and drowned; their bodies were later found together below the ceiling dome they had failed to escape. Reports suggest that Christine Millott and Gordon Roberts may have been holding each other, as they knew their death was imminent. Their bodies were found together.

Further down and around the same time, one surviving diver says they witnessed a member of their group swimming strongly downward further into the cave. This was John Bockerman, who was likely under the effects of severe nitrogen narcosis, and may have been unaware that he was swimming to his death. His body was located about 20 feet (6.1 m) further from where he was last seen, and was at the greatest depth of the four victims.

The fourth casualty, Stephen L. Millott, may have been seen lost beneath the cave ceiling shortly before the surviving divers surfaced. Although his torch and camera were found deep at the base of the rock pile, his body was found under an overhang at a depth of only 50 feet (15 m). Compared with the other victims, little is known about Stephen L.'s final moments, but he was wearing a buoyancy vest, and because he was found under an overhang, it is likely that he was buoyant at the time of death.

== Body recovery ==
A search of the cave by the police Underwater Recovery Squad to a depth of 200 feet (61 m) was initiated on 29 May 1973, the day after the accident. The search was brief, and no bodies were found. The team was aware that they were underprepared for a dive in such conditions, and the operation was described by Chief Inspector Wallace Budd of the South-Eastern Division police headquarters in Mount Gambier as a "learn as you go exercise." A second attempt was made on 30 May, again unsuccessful. The police search was ultimately postponed as the team sought Naval expertise on the dive, the training for which was expected to take several months.

The following January, the landowners permitted a television film crew, making a documentary on cave diving in the Lower South East, to enter the sinkhole. On 22 January 1974, after several days of diving in other caves in the area, the crew descended to a depth of 50 feet (15 m) and, using professional lighting equipment, illuminated the cave "like daylight." A technician looking in the direction of two of his teammates noticed what appeared to be a third person behind them. Further inspection revealed that it was a body in a wetsuit. The team turned the light away immediately and surfaced together to report their findings. According to the crew, the body was not filmed. On the morning of 23 January 1974, police arrived at the sinkhole and dove to a depth of 50 feet (15 m), where they found a body floating under a ledge against the sloped cavern roof. The body was immediately towed out, and police divers continued searching to a depth of 180 feet (55 m), finding nothing else. The body was initially only identifiable by the equipment it was wearing, and official identification required dental records. The body was found to be that of Stephen L. Millott.

The landowners, growing increasingly uncomfortable with the remaining three bodies stuck on their property, approached an amateur diving team from Melbourne to begin recovery efforts. However, the police diving team was finalising their recovery preparations around the same time.

On 9 March 1974, R. G. Trayner and a team of divers entered "The Shaft" equipped with substantially improved diving gear. At a depth of 185 feet (56 m), Trayner saw a body below him laying on its back. On further examination, he found a second body directly beneath it. These were the bodies of Christine Millott and Gordon Roberts. 20 feet (6.1 m) deeper, Trayner also located the body of John Bockerman beneath a rock ledge. He attempted to move the body into a more easily recoverable position, but abandoned the effort knowing he did not have sufficient air.

The next day, the divers attempted to return and recover the bodies, but did not succeed, and the effort was called off after the water became too murky. Several more dives were attempted, but the bodies could not be relocated. Finally, on the third day of diving, the bodies were found, and Christine Millott and Gordon Roberts were recovered from a depth of 195 feet (59 m) on 11 March 1974. Attempts were made to recover Bockerman's body from a depth of 215 feet (66 m) the following morning, but the divers aborted the recovery because of the onset of nitrogen narcosis.

The divers were sent home for a month to recover from the extended efforts and to further train for the final body recovery, which was the most challenging because of its extreme depth and position. The final dive plan included one day of diving to secure location of the body using a guide line, a rest day for the divers to recover from potential narcotic effects, though narcotic effects are now known to dissipate immediately on ascending, with no after effects, and a third day to recover the body. The divers experienced significant narcosis during both days of diving, but their improved equipment and procedures ensured the operation went as planned, and John H. Bockerman's body was recovered from the cave on 9 April 1974, 11 months and 11 days after the accident.

== Investigation and findings ==
The cause of death in all four divers was found to be lack of air with terminal drowning.

In the autopsy of Stephen L. Millott, the three possible modes of fatal injury considered were air embolism – a consequence of lung overpressure injury usually due to ascent while holding the breath – but the evidence of lung barotrauma would no longer have been detectable after such a long period, death as a consequence of breathing gas contamination, which was ruled out through tests of air remaining in the cylinder and lack of evidence of carbon monoxide in tissue samples, or death by drowning, which was supported by evidence of diatom residue in the lung tissue, indicating that there had been water entry before or possibly after death. Embolism was also found to be unlikely from the accounts of the survivors.

The coroner, Special Magistrate R.F.Stokes, concluded that the four divers overstayed their bottom time, ran out of air and died of hypoxia, the usual consequence of fatal drowning. A further finding was that although all the divers claimed to be experienced, and four of them were instructors, none of them were experienced sink-hole divers (cave divers), and that no appropriate safety precautions had been taken, referring specifically to the lack of a fail-safe return to surface system, staged emergency decompression cylinders, any recognised safety system (such as a buddy system), and that no-one clearly had responsibility for planning the dive and safety of the group.

=== Equipment ===
The equipment used by the divers was typical of the era, and when inspected under forensically valid conditions was found to be of good quality and in good condition. Of 16 cylinders inspected by the police, 14 were 72 cubic feet (2.0 m^{3}) and two were 50 cubic feet (1.4 m^{3}), connected as a twin set. At least some of the cylinders relied on a manually operated reserve valve to release the air intended as a safety margin, which was common at the time. The cylinders had been brought to the site with air filled in Sydney, but some had been refilled at Mount Gambier after the first dive. Analysis of the cylinder contents found that the air was not contaminated by carbon monoxide, though two of the cylinders recovered from the deceased had partly flooded after being emptied by their users and sinking back to the bottom, indicating that the air had been completely used up, and had corroded during the months of immersion. Air in the cylinders used by the survivors was found to be within relevant recommendations for breathing air for diving. A sample of air taken from the Mount Gambier compressor was analysed and also found to be within standards, and the compressor in good condition, with the intake clear of possible sources of contamination.

=== Allegation of contaminated air ===
Following the accident, Robert Smith alleged that he experienced severe nitrogen narcosis at 180 feet (55 m) on the initial dive, but experienced no narcotic effects after grabbing a spare tank and returning to depth to search for the others. He also claimed to be experienced at diving to depths up to 300 feet (91 m) (on air) without experiencing notable narcotic effects. The tank he took on the first dive had been filled at Mount Gambier, while the spare tank taken for his second dive to search for the missing divers had been filled back in Sydney. Smith is quoted as saying there was "something wrong with the local air", and proceeded to claim that contamination during the filling of the cylinders at Mount Gambier may have been the cause of the four fatalities.

An expert in diving medicine, Dr A. B. Mc. Cant, was consulted regarding the accident and specifically tasked with the examination of the cylinders recovered from Smith and the rest of the party. After extensive examination, and laboratory tests on the cylinder contents he concluded that the allegations of impure air were "entirely without foundation". Dr Cant had previously expressed an opinion that the group had neglected a number of safety measures in the planning and execution of the dive, and that these factors ultimately led to the incident.

== Historical perspective and impact ==
The limestone aquifer in the Mount Gambier area is up to 150 metres (490 ft) thick and is fed by rain. Flow is from northwest to south east through the porous rock, to exit at springs on the coast such as Ewens Ponds. Several sinkholes (cenotes) have formed in areas where large volumes of rock have dissolved and the roofs of the voids later collapsed. Parts of some of these sinkholes can be dived with direct access to the surface or with visible daylight – classified as cavern diving, while other parts are beyond daylight and are classified as cave diving.

From the early 1960s divers began to dive The Shaft, the Black Hole, Kilsby sinkhole and Picanninnie Ponds, with divers coming in from Victoria and New South Wales. Most of these dives were conducted in sight of natural daylight using standard open water equipment and techniques, including the typical single cylinder with J-valve reserve and no pressure gauge, single demand valve, a wetsuit and a weightbelt, but not often a buoyancy compensator. Single low powered dive lights were used, and caving reels had not yet become available.

A small minority of divers started exploring the dark zones of sinkholes and true caves, and experimented with equipment which was to develop into modern cave diving equipment. Some experiment with base-fed lifelines highlighted their limitations in true caves, while working satisfactorily in most sinkhole environments. Consequently cave reels were developed from about 1968, allowing the laying of static temporary and permanent guideline by the diver. Very few twin cylinders were in use, and mostly they were manifolded to a single outlet. Redundant air supplies started to be introduced in the 1970s, but were resisted because of cost. Octopus regulators became accepted as cave diving equipment around 1976, and as sinkhole diving equipment a few years later.

The "air-clear" water conditions experienced in the sinkholes and caves found in the Lower South East (now called the Limestone Coast) of South Australia (SA) have attracted many visiting divers, with the first cave and sinkhole dives taking place in the very late 1950s. Until the mid-1980s divers generally used single diving cylinders, and homemade torches and reels, resulting in most of their explorations being limited. Mixed-gas and rebreather technologies can now be used in many sites. The area is usually known within the cave diving community as the Mount Gambier region. It is estimated that about 8000 dives had been done in The Shaft by the time of the incident.

A series of incidents between 1969 and 1974 in the former Lower South East in which 11 divers died (including a triple and a quadruple fatality) in the karst features Kilsby sinkhole, Piccaninnie Ponds, Death Cave (also known as Alleyns Cave) and The Shaft, caused much public comment and a government inquiry to report on safety of scuba diving in sinkholes was announced by Des Corcoran, the deputy premier of South Australia, on 29 May, which led to the formation of the Cave Divers Association of Australia Inc. (CDAA) in September 1973 and the closing of sinkholes to persons not assessed by the CDAA. The introduction of a testing program by the CDAA in 1974, which involved the assessment of prospective cave divers' cave diving ability, led to a reduced fatality rate. In 1989, this testing system was replaced by a training system which consists of three levels of qualification – Basic Cave, Cave Diver and Advanced Cave Diver. Five further deaths have occurred in the region since 1974; two died at Piccaninnie Ponds in 1984, one person died at Kilsbys Hole in 2010, and two people died in separate incidents at Tank Cave in 2011 including noted cave diver Agnes Milowka.

This incident had immediate and long term consequences for the South Australian Police Underwater Recovery Squad, which had been formed in 1957 with the purpose of underwater search and recovery of bodies, stolen property, and other evidence associated with crime. Additional training and improved equipment were considered necessary for the body search and recovery operations, which expanded the scope of their capacities and have been cited as a turning point in the history of the unit.
