= CDAA =

CDAA may refer to:

- Cave Divers Association of Australia Inc. - an association that represents Australian recreational cave divers.
- Circularly Disposed Antenna Array - a large circular antenna used by the military
