= David Godwin Burchell =

Australian businessman

- Born: 23 September 1924; Millicent, South Australia.
- Died: 20 September 2009 (aged 84); Walkerville, South Australia
- Occupation: Businessman
- Known for: recreational scuba diver, football administrator

David Godwin Burchell BEM (23 September 1924 – 20 September 2009) was a South Australian business man, a recreational scuba diver and a football administrator.

== Early life ==
Burchell was born in Millicent, South Australia. At the age of 16, he lost most of his right leg as a result of railway accident.

After an unsuccessful attempt to join the Royal Australian Navy during World War II, Burchell was accepted by Royal Australian Air Force in 1944 and was discharged at the rank of Leading Aircraftman in 1946.

After discharge, Burchell worked on cattle and sheep stations in the Australian outback. After returning to Adelaide, he took up the sport of high diving and for fifteen years performed with the South Australian Diving Troupe. In 1951, he started underwater diving which would become a lifetime interest.

== Business life ==
From 1951 to 1960, he worked as a country representative for the Shell Company. In 1960, he started two businesses, Adelaide Skin Diving Centre, a scuba diving centre which he later sold, and Featherston Interiors, a contract furnishing business which he operated until retirement.

== Discovery of the wrecks of HMAS Perth and USS Houston ==
In 1967, Burchell led an expedition to locate and successfully find the wrecks of HMAS Perth and USS Houston, both sunk at the Battle of Sunda Strait during World War II. The bell from HMAS Perth, which was the object of David's search, is now in the collection of the Australian War Memorial.

== Community service ==
Burchell was the President of the North Adelaide Football Club from 1969 to 1971.

In 1973, Burchell was one of six member of the South Australian Government's inquiry into scuba diving deaths in fresh water sink-holes and underwater caves in the South East of South Australia. The Report of the Committee "appointed to investigate safety precautions for Scuba Divers in Fresh Water Sink Holes and Underwater Caves" which was presented to the Government in January 1974 essentially recommended non-legislative response to the problem. The subsequent voluntary program of regulation via diver training and certification has been carried out by the Cave Divers Association of Australia. The success of the program is evident with the low fatality rate in cave diving since the implementation of the Report's recommendations.

Burchell was a member and the patron of both the Underwater Explorers Club of South Australia and the Society for Underwater Historical Research.

== Awards ==
In 1968, Burchell received a British Empire Medal (Civil Division) in "recognition of service to diving and collection of war relics".

The City of Houston in Texas made Burchell an Honorary Citizen in recognition of the discovery of wreck of the USS Houston.

== Publications ==
- One Foot in the Grave: An Autobiography, 1967
- The Bells of Sunda Strait, 1971, Rigby, Adelaide (ISBN 0851792286) and 1972, R. Hale, London: Rigby, Adelaide (ISBN 0709124813)
- My World: An Autobiography, 1988, (ISBN 0731647572)
- A Life Downunder: An Autobiography, 1999, Charnwood Library, UK (ISBN 0708991203)

== See also ==
- Engelbrecht Cave
