= Engelbrecht Cave =

Cave system in South Australia

- North Terrace Cave; Vansittarts Cave; 5L19 & 5L20
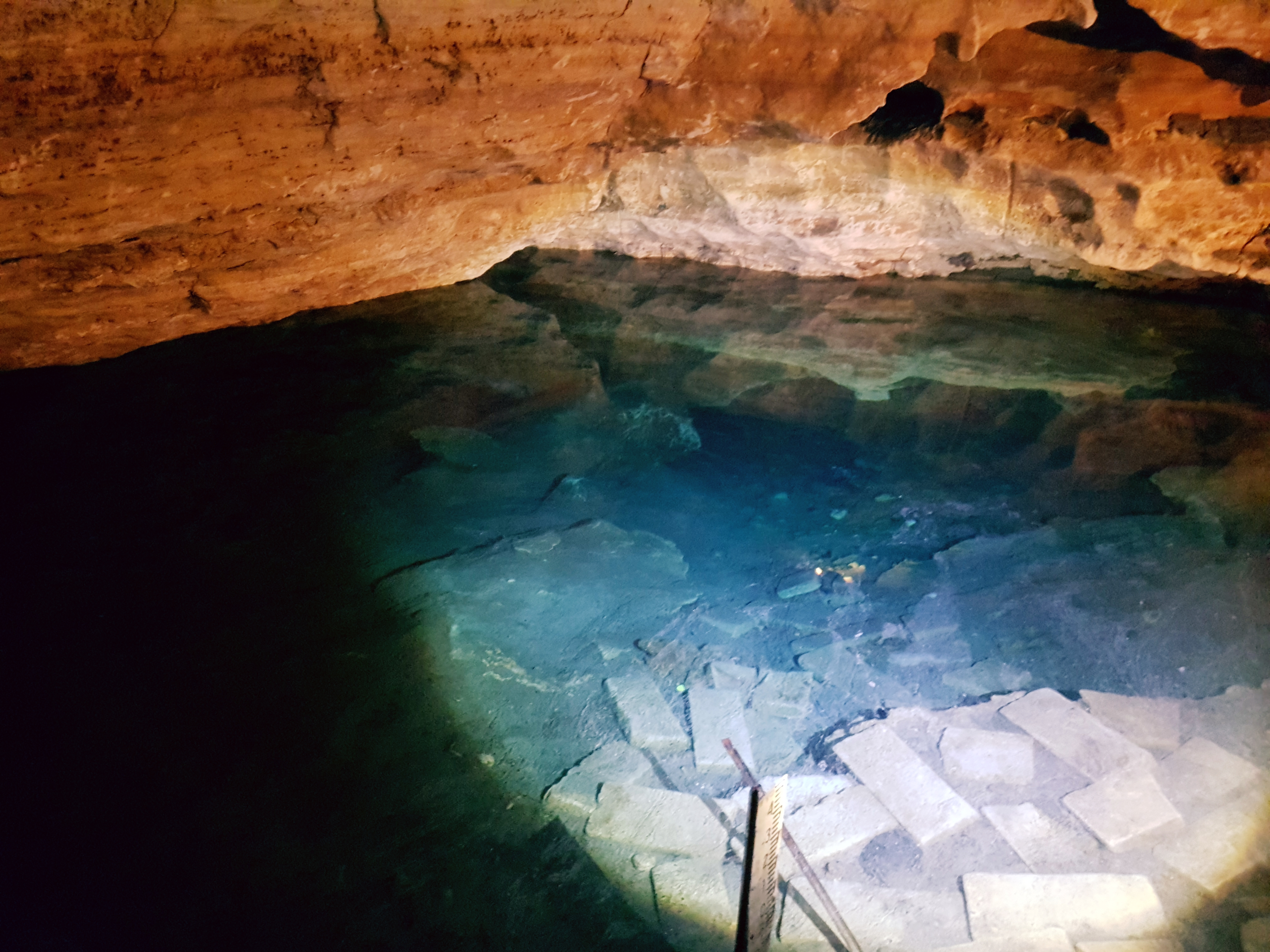

- Location within South Australia
- Location: Chute Street, Mount Gambier
- Coordinates: 37°49′14″S 140°46′20″E
- Depth: 12 metres (39 ft)
- Discovery: 1864 (by Europeans)
- Geology: Limestone
- Difficulty: Above water - no stated difficulty Underwater - CDAA Cave & Advanced Cave grades
- Hazards: Sump (cave)
- Access: Above water - public (no disabled access). Underwater - by permit.
- Lighting: Yes
- Visitors: Yes
- Features: Yes
- Website: https://mountgambier-events.bookable.net.au/#!/?searchWord=Engelbrecht%20Cave/

Engelbrecht Cave (also known as North Terrace Cave, Vansittarts Cave and 5L19 & 5L20) is a cave system in the Australian state of South Australia consisting of a sinkhole with two major passages located under the Mount Gambier urban area. It is owned by the local government area of City of Mount Gambier and has been developed as a tourism venue. Its dry extent is notable as a show cave while its water-filled extent is notable as two separate cave diving sites.

== Description ==
The cave is located on a parcel of open land within the residential area bounded to the north by Jubilee Highway West (the name used for the Princes Highway within Mount Gambier) and by the following roads on its west, south and east sides - Ehret Street, Chute Street and Victoria Terrace.

The cave consists of a collapsed area known as a sinkhole with two main passages - one running in an easterly direction and one running in a westerly direction. The east passage which extends about 70 metres (230 ft) from the doline's opening, leads to a lake where a water-filled passage leads to an air chamber. The west passage which extends about 300 metres (980 ft), is only accessible by cave diving for the majority of its length and includes a major air chamber is located immediately below Jubilee Highway West.

The ground level at street level adjoining the cave is 41 metres (135 ft) above sea level while the water level throughout the cave system is 12 metres (39 ft) above sea level. Access to the cave within Mount Gambier's street system is via Chute Street.

== Naming ==
The site is named after Carl Engelbrecht, a German immigrant who settled in Mount Gambier during the 19th century. The cave is also known as Engelbrecht's Cave, North Terrace Cave and Vansittarts Cave.

The Cave Divers Association of Australia (CDAA) refers to the flooded portion of eastern passage as Engelbrechts Cave - East and to the flooded portion of western passage as Engelbrechts Cave - West .

The Cave Exploration Group (South Australia) Incorporated (CEGSA) has classified the cave as being two sites and has identified both using its unique numbering system. The passage running in the easterly direction is numbered as 5L-19 while the passage running in the westerly direction is 5L-20.

== Geological description ==
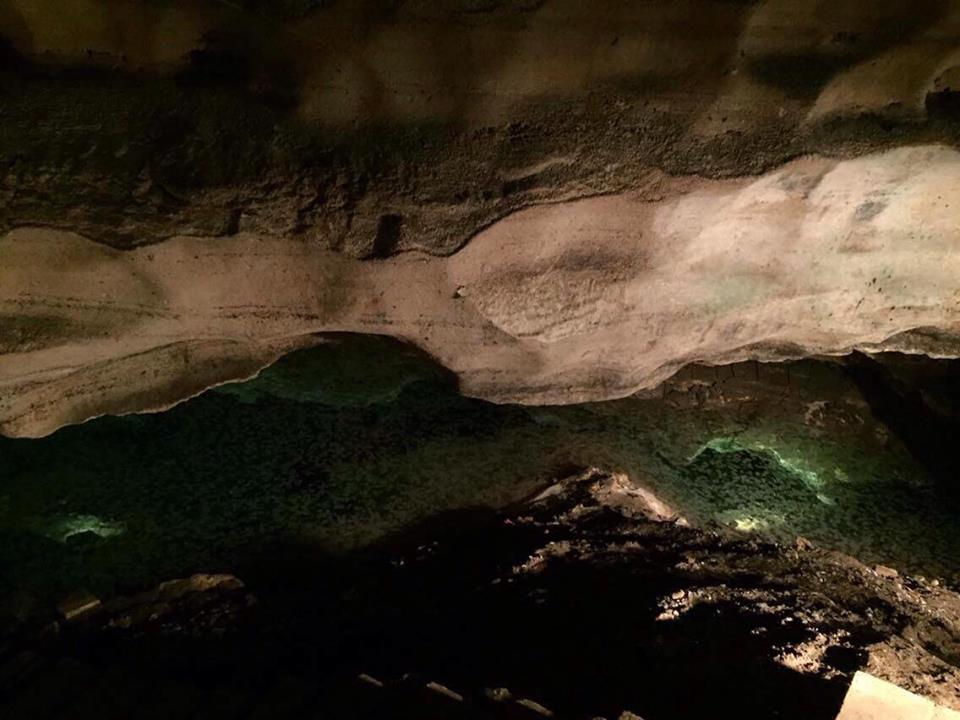
Inside of one of the two passages in Englebrecht Cave

The cave is located in a limestone known as Gambier Limestone which was formed between 35 and 45 million years ago and has an estimated thickness of about 100 metres (330 ft) at the cave itself. The topsoil surrounding the cave is volcanic in origin and dates back to the last eruption of the Mount Gambier volcano from between 2,800 and 26,000 years ago.

== History ==
The cave was first described in writing published by Julian Tenison-Woods in 1865 where the name Vansittarts Cave was first used.

In 1864, the cave was reportedly explored by four men in a canoe. In 1933, their story was told to the Mount Gambier newspaper, The Border Watch, by one of the participants, Charles Grosser who was aged seven years in 1864. Grosser described the journey within the cave as follows:

I was only nine or ten years of age at the time, but I can clearly remember how the current caught the canoe and carried us along as soon as we got into the stream. We must have gone 200 yards, travelling directly towards the Blue Lake. The stream took several turns, and the current was so strong that we had considerable difficulty in getting back…

However, one source points out that the description of the cave in 1864 does not match the cave system surveyed in 1986.

In 1885, Carl Engelbrecht purchased a flour mill located nearby and converted it into a whiskey distillery. Engelbrecht used the cave for disposal of waste such as “slimper” (“ a caustic by-product of the distillery process”) and bottles.

In May 1929, the land on which the cave is located was purchased by the then District Council of Mount Gambier. In 1940, the cave was sealed after being inspected by one of the councillors.

In 1964, the district council invited expressions of interest for “investigations for tourist potential of the cave.” One investigate include a team of four divers including “the well-known Dave Burchell” who carried out an exploratory dive with the following outcome:

After digging their way through 100 years of rubbish and entering a dark muddy passage, a relatively small lake was discovered with a very silty floor, which was only 17 feet deep. Their report to the council was not suitable for tourist development.

In 1979, the Lions Club of Mount Gambier commenced a project of beautifying the cave with the associated works taking three years to complete with the expense of $10,000.

In 1995, Engelbrecht Cave was added to the South Australian Heritage Register.

In December 2019, divers including Matthew Aisbett and Josh Richards started looking around the end of Engelbrecht East Cave's air chamber, and in what was a random reflection off a tiny surface lake a few years ago, has now evolved into an enormous new cave network running under the centre of Mt Gambier, believed to be the 2nd largest cave in the Limestone Coast.

In July 2024, the City of Mount Gambier started running guided tours of Engelbrecht Cave and providing visitor servicing from the site.

== Present day ==
The cave is operated by The City of Mount Gambier. The facility includes light refreshments, visitor servicing, an accessway into the cave system including viewing platforms at the lakes in both passages, toilets and range of open spaces with varying degrees of shelter for picnics and associated activities. The City of Mount Gambier also offers guided tours of the dry sections of both cave passages.

Access for cave diving is limited as follows: those wishing to dive the eastern passage need to have the CDAA Cave grade while those wishing to dive the western passage need to have the CDAA Advanced Cave grade.
