= Cave Divers Association of Australia =

Australian cave diving organisation

- Abbreviation: CDAA
- Formation: 29 September 1973
- Type: NGO
- Legal status: Incorporated association
- Purpose: Recreational cave diving administration, certification & training.
- Location: Mount Gambier, South Australia
- Region served: Australia
- Members: 679 (2008)
- National Director: Grant Pearce
- Main organ: National Committee
- Website: www.cavedivers.com.au

The Cave Divers Association of Australia (CDAA) is a cave diving organisation which was formed in September 1973 to represent the interests of recreational scuba divers who dive in water-filled caves and sinkholes principally in the Lower South East (now called the Limestone Coast) of South Australia (SA) and secondly in other parts of Australia. Its formation occurred after a series of diving fatalities in waterfilled caves and sinkholes in the Mount Gambier region between 1969 and 1973 and in parallel to a Government of South Australia inquiry into these deaths. The CDAA's major achievement has been the dramatic reduction of fatalities via the introduction of a site rating scheme and an associated testing system which was brought in during the mid-1970s. While its major area of operation is in the Limestone Coast region of SA, it administers and supports cave diving activity in other parts of Australia including the Nullarbor Plain and Wellington, New South Wales.

== Organisation and purpose ==
The CDAA is a nationally based organisation without state or territory branches and which is managed on a day-to-day basis by the National Committee – an executive consisting of five directors who are elected bi-annually. It is incorporated in SA as an incorporated association. Its purpose is concerned with fostering ‘the development, advancement, promotion, mapping, education, exploration, conservation, safety and research of underwater caves and related features.’ As dive sites are on either controlled Government or private property, one of the CDAA's key functions is to liaise with landowners to organise access for its members to enter and dive. The CDAA also owns a cave diving site, Tank Cave, which is located near Tantanoola and which was purchased in 2011.

== Origins ==
=== Background ===
From the late 1950s onwards, the Lower South East of SA became a popular destination for recreational scuba diving due to the presence of very clear water and easy access to deep water. However, this activity was completely unregulated. From 1969 to 1974, 11 people died at the following four cave diving sites: the Kilsby sinkhole (two fatalities), Piccaninnie Ponds (two fatalities), Alleyns Cave (three fatalities) and The Shaft (four fatalities).

=== The 1973 South Australian Government inquiry ===
Immediately following the multiple fatality in The Shaft on 28 May 1973, Des Corcoran, the SA Deputy Premier, announced the appointment of a committee to ‘investigate safety precautions for Scuba Divers in Fresh water Sinkholes and Underwater Caves’ and which consisted of three government officers – L.D. Draper (Chair), R.J. Wight (Secretary), G .C. Cornwall, and three representatives from the SA recreational diving community – D.G. Burchell, P.G. Christopher and R.C. Pulford. In January 1974, the Committee offered five recommendations. Firstly, the creation of a government advisory body to essentially encourage a higher standard of cave diving practice by the recreational diving community; secondly, the publication and distribution of educational material to improve the awareness of cave diving safety; thirdly, the installation of warning signs at sinkhole and cave sites; fourthly, the sealing of Alleyns Cave (also known as the Death Cave) to prevent access and finally, in the case of the failure of the first three recommendations to reduce fatalities, consideration of control by legislative measures. The fifth recommendation suggested measures such as the licensing of instructors, an access permit system and the use of patrol officers to manage sites. In April 1974, the SA Government announced that it would proceed with the recommendations of the committee including the creation of an advisory body.

=== Foundation of the CDAA ===
On 11 July 1973, after giving evidence to the Committee, a group of divers from the Lower South East, other parts of SA, Victoria and New South Wales met in Mount Gambier to agree to form the Cave Divers Association of Australia. At a subsequent meeting in Mount Gambier on 29 September 1973, the organisation was officially formed. Its formation is attributed to a desire amongst divers to have a ‘unified voice’ in order to defend cave diving and to demonstrate to both the landowners and the public a willingness and an ability to regulate their own affairs to achieve safer cave diving practice. In a letter dated 21 October 1973 to the Committee, the CDAA officially announced its existence, that it was formed by divers experienced in sinkhole and cave diving who all agreed that "all members should be safety conscious and fully conversant in the use of scuba…" and that "inexperienced divers must not be permitted to dive without tuition under the guidance of an experienced cave diver". It also advised that it intended to incorporate in SA, create an instructor body, create a permit system for access and to approach all landowners (including government) to seek their support for exclusive access by CDAA members.

== Certification of divers ==
=== The testing system ===
In 1974, the newly formed CDAA devised a testing system that was intended to gain the confidence of the owners of the land on which most popular sinkholes and caves sites were located. This system assessed the ability of a diver to safely dive in cave sites against a rating system that divided these sites into three levels of difficulty.

Firstly, popular cave diving sites were assessed against a rating system that divided these sites into the following three levels of difficulty: Category 1, i.e. open, deep-water caverns or sinkholes with minimal if any overhang or ceiling, Category 2, i.e. similar deep holes with considerable overhangs and Category 3, i.e. with a lot more penetration under flooded ceilings, and more severe silting potential.

Secondly, divers with a minimum level of certification and minimum experience were qualified by attending a theory and a practical examination. A successful result in both examinations resulted in the awarding of a combined membership and certification card for either Category 1, 2 or 3.

A fourth category known as Advanced Category 3 (subsequently renamed Category 4) was introduced to include cave sites which were almost entirely flooded or which had areas that were unsuitable for two divers to negotiate at the same time.

During the years of the testing system's operation, there were only three deaths which all occurred as part of two accidents in Piccaninnie Ponds during the years 1974 and 1984. The relative success of the system showed that CDAA had been very successful in ensuring that prospective cave divers have met minimum standards of training for cave diving.

=== The training system ===
In 1989, the CDAA replaced its testing system with a training and qualification system based on four new site categories as part of a restructure of its overall operation.

== The CDAA training system ==
=== The 1989 system ===
The training system which was introduced in 1989 was based on the following four new site categories.

Cavern – a Cavern is defined as body of water which has a maximum depth of 20 metres and may contain overhangs or near vertical ascents where daylight is always visible (i.e. limestone caverns, dams, flooded quarries, lakes etc.). The maximum linear penetration allowed is 40m from the surface. This replaced the Category 1 rating.

Sinkhole – a Sinkhole is defined as a body of fresh water which can have large passages (no restrictions too small for two divers to swim adjacent to each other) and which exceeds 20m in depth. The maximum linear penetration allowed is 60m from the surface. The CDAA recommends a maximum depth of 40m on air. This replaced the Category 2 rating.

Cave – a Cave is defined as an enclosed body of water containing overhangs, silt, darkness zones and passages that are still large enough for two divers to swim adjacent to each other. Cave sites allow a maximum penetration of 1/3 of a twin cylinder gas supply. This replaced the Category 3 rating. This qualification is similar to ratings such as 'Introduction to Cave' or 'Basic Cave' which are offered by other cave diving training organisations.

Penetration – a Penetration is defined as an enclosed body of water containing silt, darkness zones, and passages without restriction on size of passages, number of cylinders or penetration distances. This replaced the Category 4 rating.

=== 2007 changes ===
The Cavern and Sinkhole qualifications were merged in 2007 to create a new qualification called Deep Cavern while the Penetration qualification was substantially revised in 2009 and renamed as Advanced Cave.

=== 2017 changes ===
In December 2017, the Deep Cavern qualification was replaced with a new qualification called Basic Cave as part of the following changes to the training system:

- The Basic Cave syllabus does not include the requirement for a maximum depth of 40 metres (130 ft) during training in order to encourage the use of this level of cave diving training in other parts of Australia where depths of 40 metres (130 ft) cannot be achieved. A diver with a Basic Cave is limited to the maximum depth achieved during training and may need to do additional deep diving training if they wish to dive in sites with depths greater than those dived during training.
- The expansion of an existing recognition system of training by organisations other than the CDAA (known as an "endorsement") from nitrox, trimix & rebreather to include training such as deep diving, side-mount and scooters to both meet the needs of Basic Cave divers and the operators of cave diving sites in other parts of the world requesting evidence of training appropriate to their sites
- The ability to do CDAA Advanced Cave training at sites outside of Australia using a network of cave diving instructors approved by the CDAA.

=== The effectiveness of the training system ===
Since the advent of the training system in 1989, three divers have died while diving in CDAA-rated sites in the Limestone Coast. The three fatalities occurred in Kilsby Sinkhole during March 2010, and in Tank Cave during February 2011 and October 2011. As of March 2013, the Coroner's Court of South Australia had not reported on these deaths.

=== Recognition of other training ===
As of October 2013, most inland cave sites in Australia can only be accessed by CDAA members because the access negotiated by the CDAA usually includes the obligation to indemnify the landowner via waiver and insurance. The CDAA does recognise training provided by other organisations that is comparable to its own and will permit access via the following avenues.

For divers visiting from outside of Australia, the CDAA may grant a visitor's pass which is effectively a temporary CDAA membership, for the purpose of accessing dive sites under the CDAA's authority.

For individuals wishing to cross over and become a permanent member, the CDAA will recognise training from certain other organisations and individuals can apply for CDAA membership including receipt of qualification at a level comparable to their current level of training ONLY after being evaluated by a CDAA Instructor.

== Sites ==
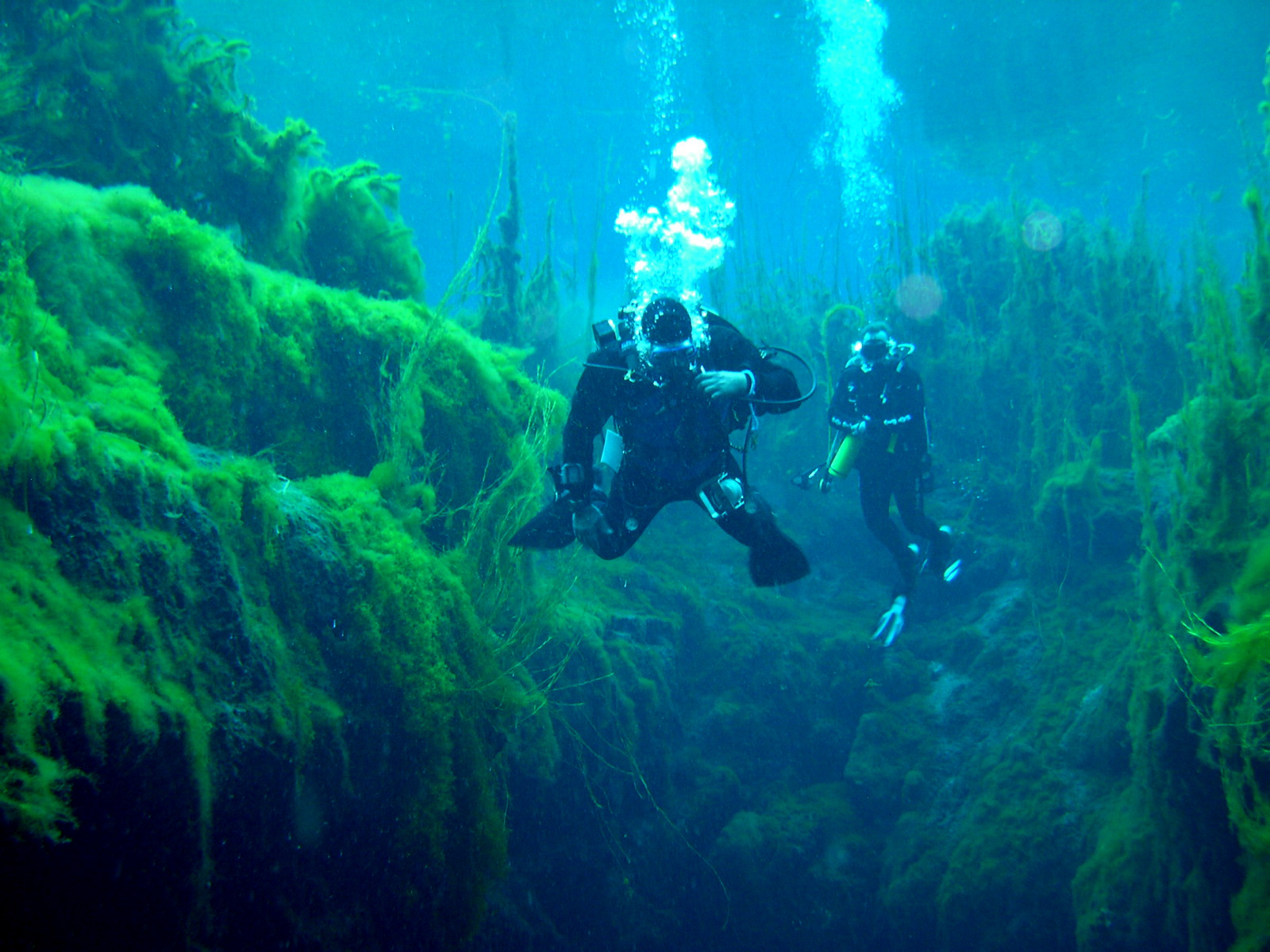
Diving in Piccaninnie Ponds

The sites rated by the CDAA are located in the Limestone Coast region of SA, New South Wales, the Northern Territory and the Nullarbor Plain in Western Australia. Some sites have dual or multiple ratings because the underwater features and conditions vary to the extent that some parts of a site may require more advanced skill in order to safely access.

=== South Australia ===
While the Limestone Coast is the official name for the region, it is usually known within the cave diving community as the Mount Gambier region after the region's principal city. CDAA rated sites are located in the following local government areas.

The City of Mount Gambier:

- Cave – Engelbrechts Cave East.
- Advanced Cave – Engelbrechts Cave West.

The District Council of Grant:

- Basic Cave – Blacks Hole, Ela Elap, Gouldens Hole, Hells Hole, Horse & Cart, Kilsby's Sinkhole, Little Blue Lake, McKay's Shaft, One Tree, Piccaninnie Ponds, Tea Tree, Ten Eighty, The Shaft and The Sisters.
- Cave – Allendale Sinkhole, Baker's Cave, Dave's Cave and Max's Hole.
- Advanced Cave – Hann's Cave.

The Wattle Range Council:

- Cave – Fossil Cave and Mud Hole.
- Advanced Cave – Nettlebed, Iddlebiddy, Stinging Nettle Cave, Tank Cave, and Three Sisters Cave.
- Cave/Advanced Cave – The Pines.

=== New South Wales ===
- Basic Cave/Cave/Advanced Cave – Burrinjuck Dam near Yass,
- Basic Cave – Glenbawn Dam near Aberdeen,
- Cave – Water (Anticline) Cave at Wellington.
- Cave/Advanced Cave – Limekiln (McCavity) Cave at Wellington.

=== Northern Territory ===
- Basic Cave – Rum Jungle Lake.

=== West Australia ===
- Cave – Tommy Grahams Cave.
- Advanced Cave – Cocklebiddy Cave, Murra El Elevyn, Olwolgin Cave, Roe Plains and Weebubbie Cave.

== Publications ==
=== Newsletter ===
- Guidelines (1978 to the present) (ISSN 0726-0490) OCLC 222608964.

=== Conference Papers ===
- Occasional Paper No. 1 (Conference on Cave Diving, Mount Gambier, August 1977). North Adelaide & Melbourne: Cave Divers Association of Australia. 1977.
- Occasional Paper No. 2 (Topics presented at CDAA Biannual conference, September 22nd 1979, Mount Gambier). Cave Divers Association of Australia. September 1981.

=== Research Group Reports ===
- Research Report No. 1 Kilsbys Hole Study. North Adelaide: Cave Divers Association of Australia Inc – Research Group. February 1983.
- Stace, Peter (1984). Research Report No. 2 The Shaft. North Adelaide: Cave Divers Association of Australia Inc – Research Group.
- Horne, Peter (1984–1985). Research Report No. 3 Piccaninnie Ponds Mapping Project, November 1984 – April 1985. North Adelaide: Cave Divers Association of Australia Inc – Research Group.
- Horne, Peter (January 1994). Research Report No. 4 Engelbrechts Cave (5L19/20) Mapping Project, 1986. North Adelaide: Cave Divers Association of Australia Inc – Research Group.
- Horne, Peter (22 December 1988). Research Report No. 5 Barnoolut Estate Sinkholes 1988 Environmental Assessment Project. North Adelaide: Cave Divers Association of Australia Inc – Research Group.

== See also ==
- List of caves in Australia
- Agnes Milowka – Australian cave diver
- Richard Harris (anaesthetist) – Australian anesthesiologist and cave diver (born 1964)
