= Dive light =

Light used underwater by a diver

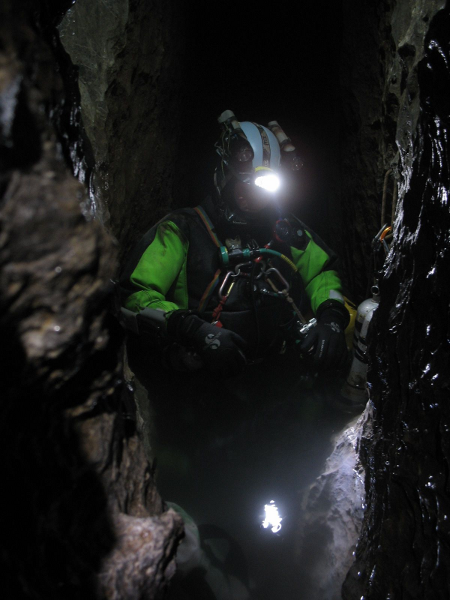
- Cave diver with head-mounted light
- Uses: Providing light underwater for safety, navigation, communication, facilitating work or restoring colour

A dive light is a light source carried by an underwater diver to illuminate the underwater environment. Scuba divers generally carry self-contained lights, but surface supplied divers may carry lights powered by cable supply .

A dive light is routinely used during night dives and cave dives, when there is little or no natural light, but also has a useful function during the day, as water absorbs the longer (red) wavelengths first then the yellow and green with increasing depth. By using artificial light, it is possible to view an object in full color at greater depths.

== Need ==
Water attenuates light by absorption, so use of a dive light will improve a diver's underwater vision at depth. As the depth increases, more light is absorbed by the water. Color absorption depends on the purity of the water - pure water is most transparent to blue frequencies, but impurities may reduce this significantly. Color vision is also affected by turbidity and larger particulate matter.

== History ==
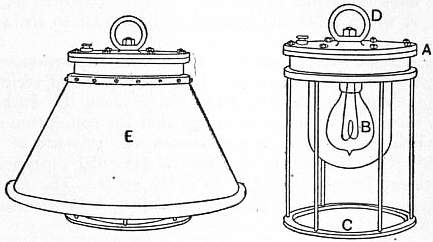
Submarine Electric Lamp, with and without Reflector A. Metal case containing electrical fittings. B. Glass globe and incandescent lamp. C. Stand, which also protects the globe. D. Ring for suspending lamp. E. Reflector.

Early underwater lights were fixed electric flood lamps or portable lamps with dry batteries for use by divers in standard diving dress. Siebe Gorman & Company Ltd developed a model of portable lamp with a parabolic lens and attached to the divers corselet via a ball and socket joint allowing the diver to use both hands while working.

In 1906, the tungsten filament was introduced and used to produce 200 to 3,000 candlepower incandescent dive lights. The Siebe Gorman & Company introduced a 250-watt mercury vapor hand lamp in 1919 that could produce as much as 18,000 candles. For diving in turbid water, 45-watt Sodium hand lamps became the preferred choice. These early lights had to be turned on underwater to avoid cracking the heated glass as it entered cold water.

The first lantern available to the US Navy had 150 candlepower. The early testing showed a need to increase the length of cable on the US Navy Standard Lantern from 125 feet to 250 feet in 1915 to allow for greater operational range. The United States Navy Experimental Diving Unit continues to evaluate dive lights for wet and dry illumination output, battery duration, watertight integrity, as well as maximum operating depth.

Halogen bulbs came into use in the latter decades of the 20th century as they produced more light for the power used. They were followed by high intensity discharge lamps and later, light emitting diodes, both singly and in arrays. Surface supplied divers could use power from a cable in the umbilical, but scuba divers need lights that are independent of a connection to the surface to make best use of their mobility advantage. The portable power sources progressed from lead–acid batteries for rechargeable lights and zinc–carbon batteries for disposable power supplies, to alkaline batteries, Nickel–cadmium (NiCad), Nickel-metal hydride (NiMH), and most recently, rechargeable lithium–ion batteries

Waterproof miners lights were found to be suitable for moderate depths and were popular for cave diving. For greater depths, home made, and later professionally manufactured canister lights continued the tradition of a powerful but heavy and bulky power supply, connected to a lightweight, easily carried light-head, which could be carried in the hand or suspended from a clip or round the neck when both hands were needed for a task. The Goodman handle was developed to allow the light head to be carried on the back of the hand, which freed up the fingers for other tasks. This was later developed into the Goodman glove, a soft partial glove which supports the light in the same way as a Goodman handle. As of 2000, canister lights with sealed lead-acid batteries(12V 7AH) were standard for primary cave lights, with HID also popular for caving as they were more efficient, using lower wattage for equivalent lumens – an 18W HID would be brighter and burn longer than 50W halogen. The disadvantage of HID was that it could not be turned off then immediately on again and was much more expensive.

There has been a continuous increase in lumen output for lower power of light sources, and increased power density of batteries. By the second decade of the 21st century compact hand held lights with several thousand lumens output were available in wide and narrow beam configurations, sometimes combined and sometimes combined with red LEDs and flashing sequences similar to strobes. These lights are often also suitable for use as video lights and can substitute for strobes for still photography, at a price. Some LED lights are also available with ultraviolet output for viewing and photography of fluorescent organisms.

Both narrow beam spotlights and wide beam flood lights and combinations have been available since the early years. Some of the light heads had reflectors which could be slid along the axis to focus the beam, but more recent lights simply provide a separate set of LEDs for narrow and wide beam, and switch from one to the other as needed. Variable power output is also common on these lights and the power selected allows low brightness for a long burn time or higher brightness and shorted burn.

An early canister light attributed to Frank Martz around 1965 used sealed beam automotive lights. Later cave lights used test tube light heads. These were made commercially in the early 1970s by Lamar English (English Engineering), and later Mark Leonard produced a range of canister lights with both circular and rectangular section canisters in acrylic and aluminium. Mark Leonard co-founded Dive-Rite, and American Underwater Lighting took over from English Engineering, Bill Gavin modified the English light with quick disconnect cables, which AUL produced as the Spectrum 1000 Extreme Exposure. NiCad batteries were in use in a few canister lights by 2000.

== Modern sources ==
There are several options when it comes to light head/bulb types:

Xenon (incandescent) - emit a warm natural light, and tend to be the less expensive, however, offer less brightness and have a shorter battery life than LED or HID lights.

LED (light emitting diode) - are very durable, efficient and powerful.

HID (high intensity discharge) - are extremely powerful and have a nearly white beam. On the downside, HIDs are very delicate and quite expensive.

A modern dive light usually has an output of at least about 100 lumens. Bright dive lights have values from about 2500 lumens. Halogen lamps provide this light at over 50W power consumption. High-intensity discharge lamps (HID) and Light-emitting diodes (LED) can provide similar output for less power.

== Configuration ==
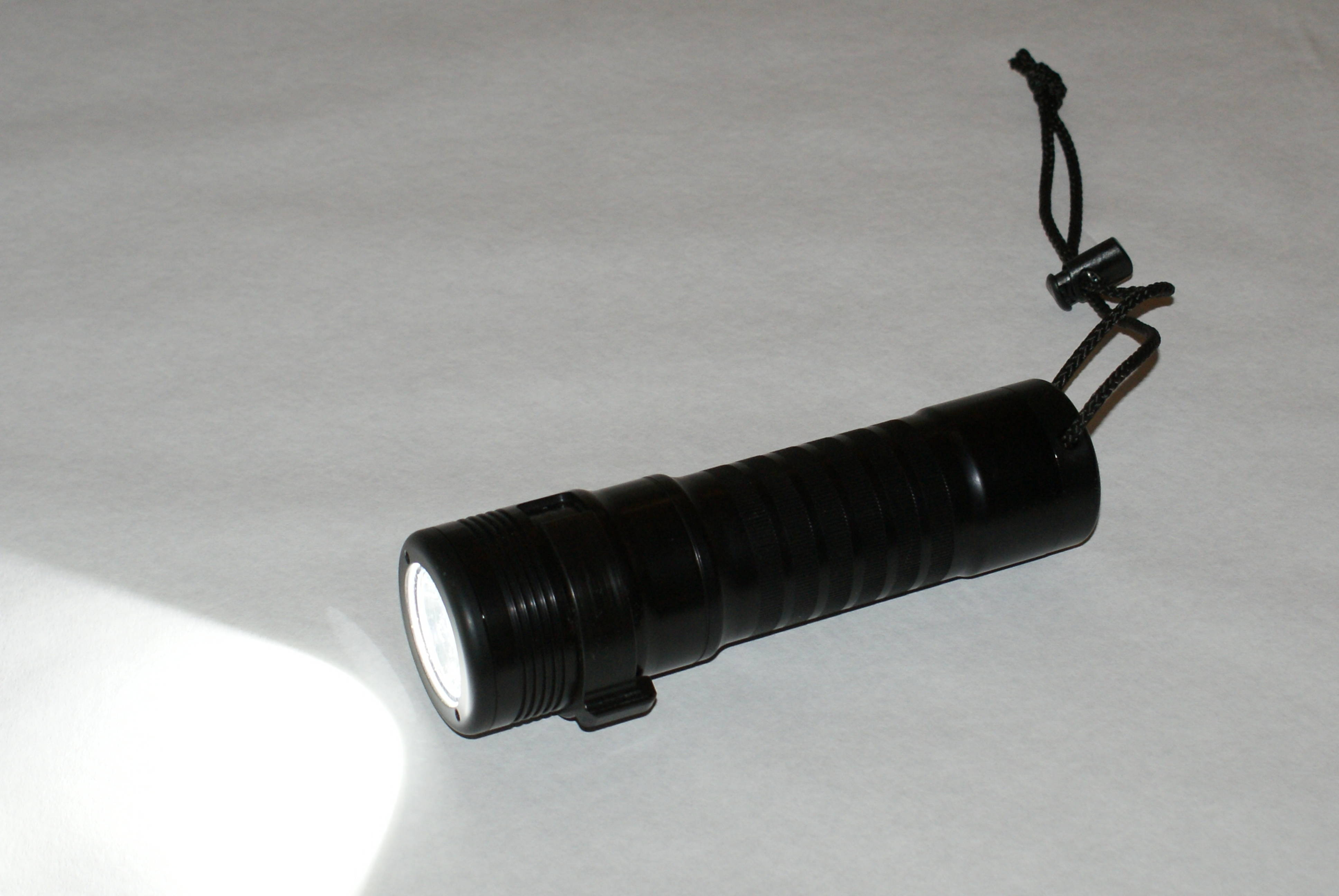
handheld 1000-lumen LED dive light

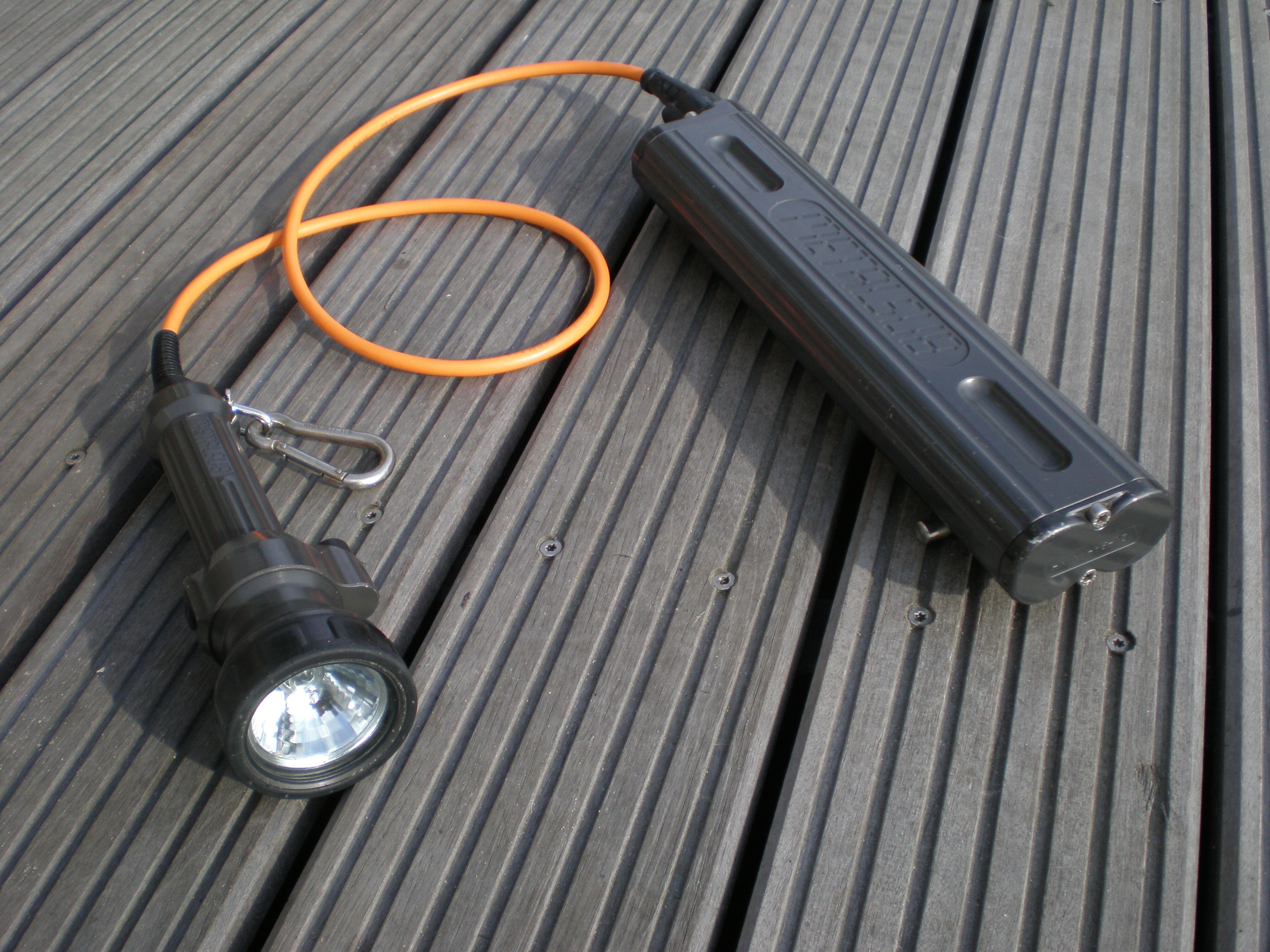
50W halogen canister light

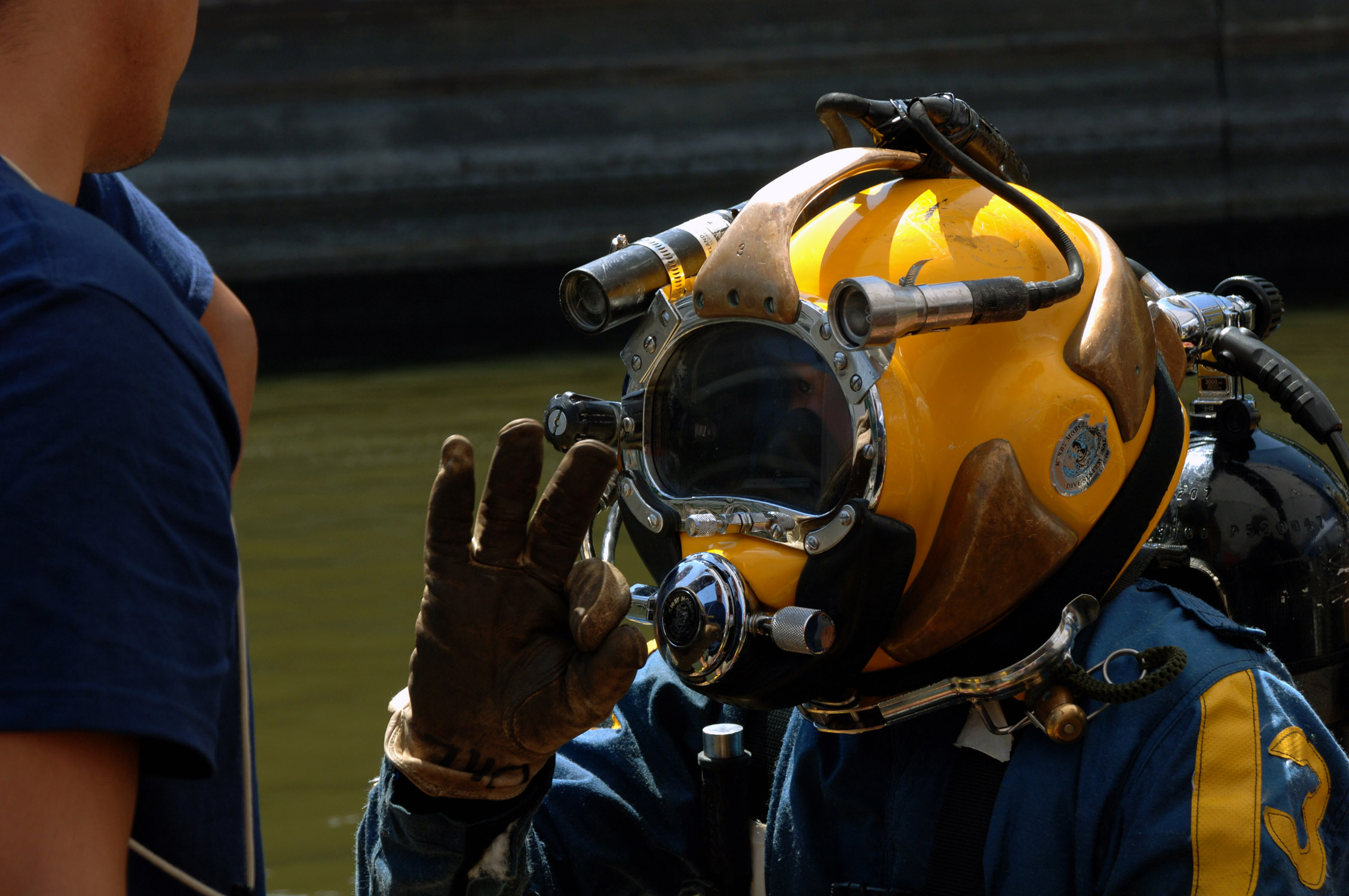
Surface supplied light head and closed circuit video camera mounted on Kirby-Morgan 17 helmet.

=== Hand held (Integral) ===
The light source and the power supply are housed in the same water and pressure resistant housing. The light is switched on and off by a mechanism built into the housing

=== Canister light ===
Canister lights originated when the battery size required for sufficient burn time of a high output light was too large to be conveniently carried in the diver's hand. The work-around was to use a light-head with the light source, which is small and light enough to easily carry in the hand or on a head mount, and provide power through a cable from a waterproof battery canister, which is carried on the diver's harness. The cable also functions as a tether for the light-head, and allows it to be hung round the diver's neck to illuminate work where both hands are needed.

=== Head mount ===
Head mount lights are used by divers who need to use both hands for other purposes. This can be underwater work by a commercial diver, or getting through tight restrictions for a cave or wreck diver. With a head mount there is a greater risk of dazzling other divers in the vicinity, as the lights move with the diver's head, and this arrangement is more appropriate for divers who work or explore alone. Helmet mounts are common for commercial work which is often monitored by a helmet mount closed circuit video camera.

Both one piece lights intended to be hand held, and light heads powered from canisters or surface supplied cables are used for head mount lights. There are also a few one piece lights specifically made for head mounting, and a full face mask made by Ocean Reef which has integrated lighting.

Caving head lights are sometimes usable as head mount lights for shallow cave dives, as they are waterproof, but they are generally not designed to be used under much pressure.

Use of a head mounted light temporarily to accomplish a task needing both hands can help the diver illuminate the task, or keep track of the guideline in a penetration dive. the light may be switched on for the duration of the task, or the primary light may be temporarily placed on the helmet. A head mounted light is also immediately available if a hand held primary light fails and the main backup is stowed where it cannot easily be reached at the time. Head mounted lights also cause more prominent backscatter, reducing visibility in turbid water.

=== Surface supplied ===
If the diver is supplied with breathing gas from the surface, it is convenient to supply power for lights from the surface through the same umbilical. An extra cable is generally used for this purpose. The light head is functionally the same as for a canister light, and is usually mounted on the helmet, where it may be referred to as a hat light.

== Construction ==
=== Housings ===
Several materials are used for housings. Injection moulded plastics are most popular for the low end and some of the more powerful lights produced in large quantities. Low volume products and home built lights are generally machined from aluminium alloy or high grade engineering plastics such as acetal (Delrin), or occasionally stainless steel, brass or bronze. Lenses (ports) are usually high grade transparent plastic or toughened glass. O-ring seals are standard for sealing joints and connections and for sealing penetrations through the watertight housing for switch controls.

=== Power supply ===
Alkaline batteries, zinc-carbon batteries, Nickel–metal hydride batteries (NiMH), lithium-ion batteries, lead-acid batteries, and surface supply by cable are commonly used as power supply.

Voltage depends on the requirements of the specific light source and usually ranges from 1.2 V for a single NiMH cell, to 12 V for a lead-acid accumulator. Surface powered helmet lights may use 24 or 36 V power supplies. High voltage is not generally used except in the final stage of the HID circuit, for safety reasons.

=== Switching ===
Lights which must be switched on or off underwater require a switch which is unaffected by the pressure and is waterproof.

- Magnetic switches have the advantage of working through the housing without requiring a penetration, but can affect a compass which may be relied on for navigation. The magnet is held in an external slider or bezel, and may rust if exposed to water.
- Toggle switches with rubber mouldings that go completely over the toggle lever and seal to the housing have been used for both production and custom lights.
- External levers operating internal switches via a rotating shaft sealed with O-rings are also used.
- Push-buttons can be used but must be spring-loaded sufficiently to compensate for the external pressure. This is usually done by using a small diameter pushrod with O-ring seals, and a moderate strength spring. On the outside a broad mushroom head is used for comfort.
- Screw-on end covers are common. This is almost always the cover that is removed to change batteries, so it has to be removable and well sealed anyway. This end of the light is screwed further onto the body to make contact between the battery and a contact. Barrel seal O-rings are used to prevent leakage while allowing the cover to move axially to close the contact. Double O-rings are more reliable as if the first one leaks the second is a backup. This type of switch is best operated as seldom as possible underwater and is often not very convenient to use, being relatively stiff, sometimes needing both hands to operate.

== Accessories ==
Technical divers often use a Goodman type handle to carry a light on the back of the hand, so the hand can be used without dropping the light. This handle type was originally rigid, and used to carry a canister light head, but is now also used for small one piece lights. Derivatives use bungee to hold the light in place, or are made of soft material and worn like a glove. These are variously referred to as glove handles, Goodman gloves, hands-free light holders, or soft hand mounts.

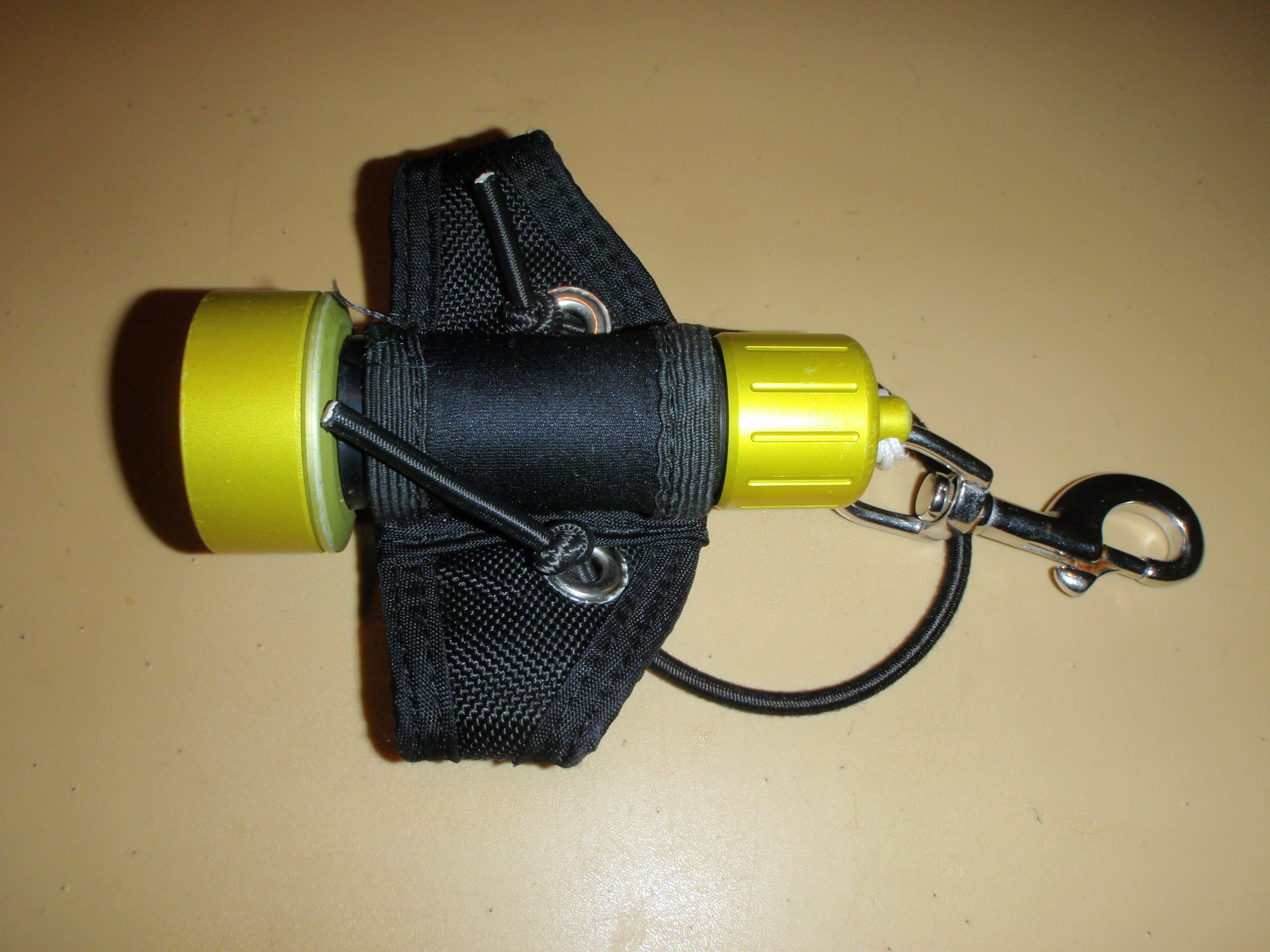
Small dive light on soft Goodman type handle, side view

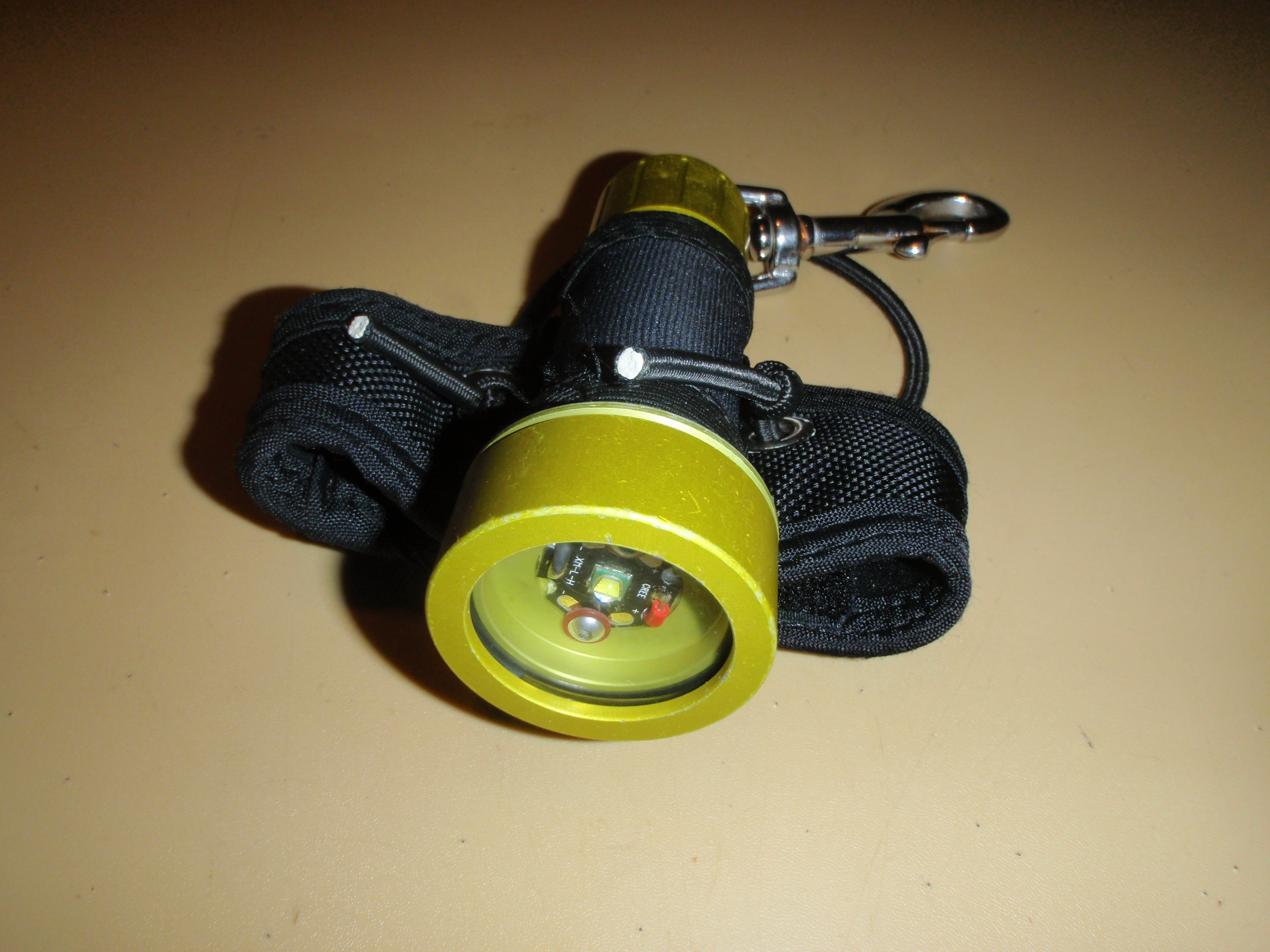
Small dive light on soft Goodman type handle, front view

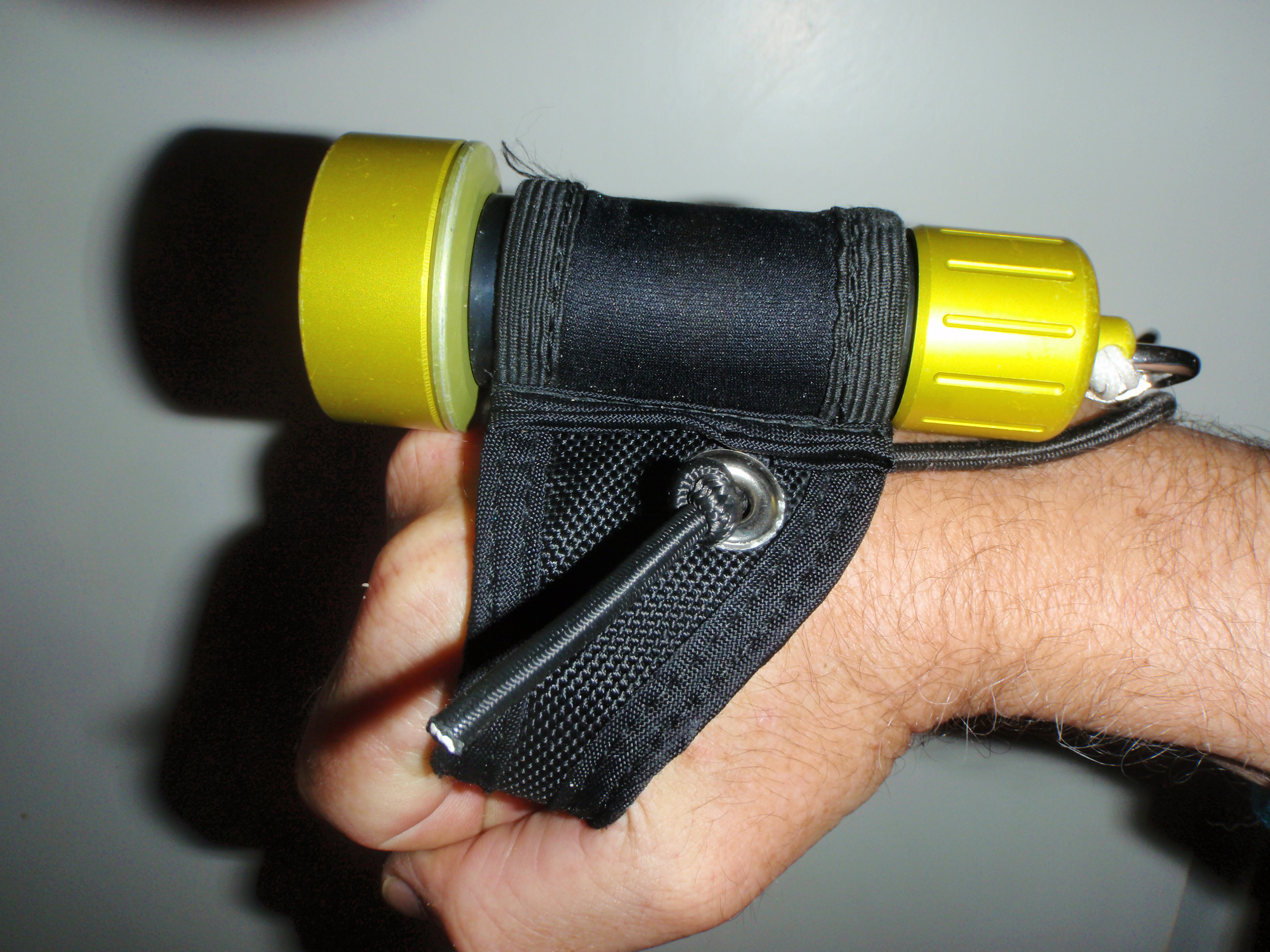
Small dive light on soft Goodman type handle, side view, showing use of handle

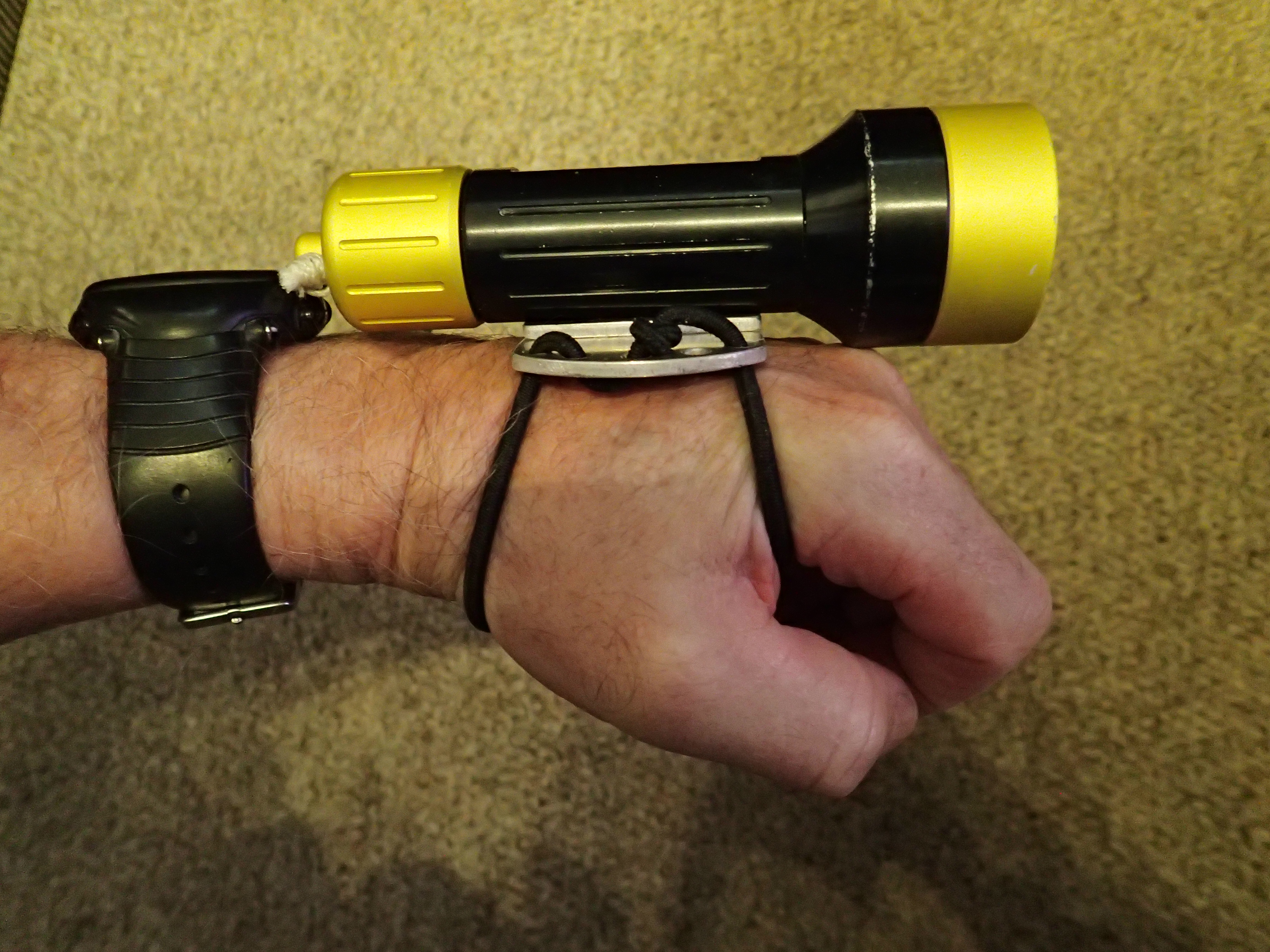
Simple bungee hand mount

== Beam angle ==
Narrow beam (spotlight) vs wide beam (floodlight), vs focusing (by adjustable lens or reflector):

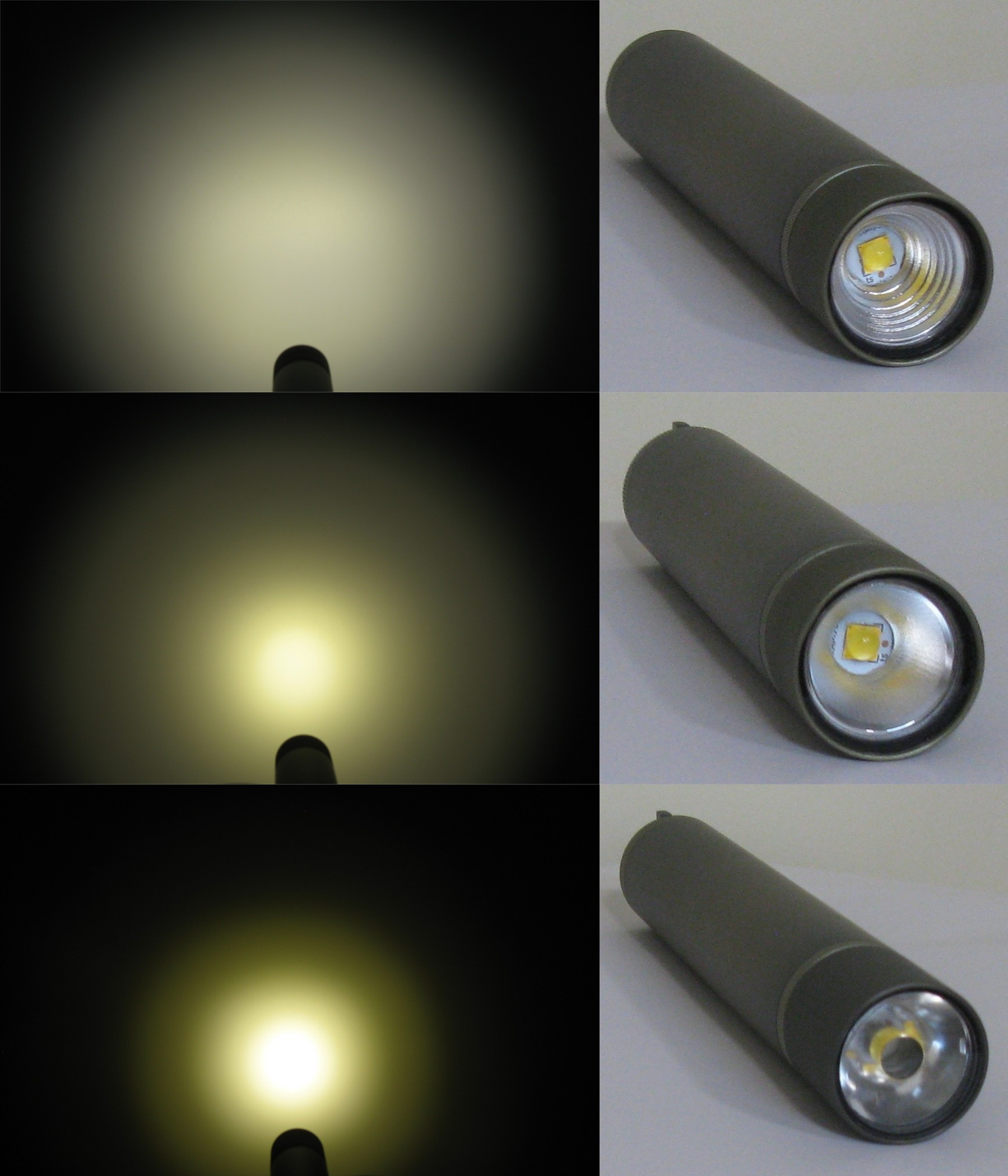
Dive flashlight with different reflectors and collimator for LED XHP70.2

Beam angle is chosen to suit the conditions and activities of the planned dive. Cave divers frequently choose narrow beam lights when diving in good visibility as these provide good illumination over relatively long distances, which is useful when navigating into an unfamiliar space where it is actually possible to see a fairly long distance ahead. Some feel that in poor visibility, or at short range, a narrow beam is not much use, and a wider beam spreads the light over a more useful area. Others feel that in low visibility settings a wide beam angle is distracting as it tends to reflect back to much light from floating particulates (back-scatter). Video lighting usually requires a wider beam as the view angle of the video camera must be accommodated for good results. In the case of very wide angle video, such as the GoPro and similar, an extremely wide angle beam is necessary.

Beam angle may be as tight as 8 to 10 degrees in extreme cases, or as wide as around 140° with a plain flat glass port. Even wider angles are possible (exceeding 180°) with a domed port on the light, or a "test tube" light without reflector. LED lights usually use an internal "lens" to produce a focused beam. This actually focuses the beam by internal reflection on a parabolic surface. Several lens options may be available for different beam angles for a given LED, but most models of light use only the one chosen by the manufacturer.

A few underwater lights have a focusing facility by which the beam angle can be adjusted. There are two ways this can be done, depending on the basic emission pattern of the light source. HID lights, which generally produce non-directional light, are usually focused by a reflector, which can be slid longitudinally over the light. They produce a beam with a central bright area and a diffuse general illumination around it. This is good for illuminating a combination of near and far areas at the same time, but not good for wide angle video, as the hot-spot will confuse the automatic exposure software and the result is generally overexposure in the hot spot and underexposure around it.

Other lights use a lens system over the front of the light, which may be focused by axial movement of the lens, which may be on a screw thread for fine control.

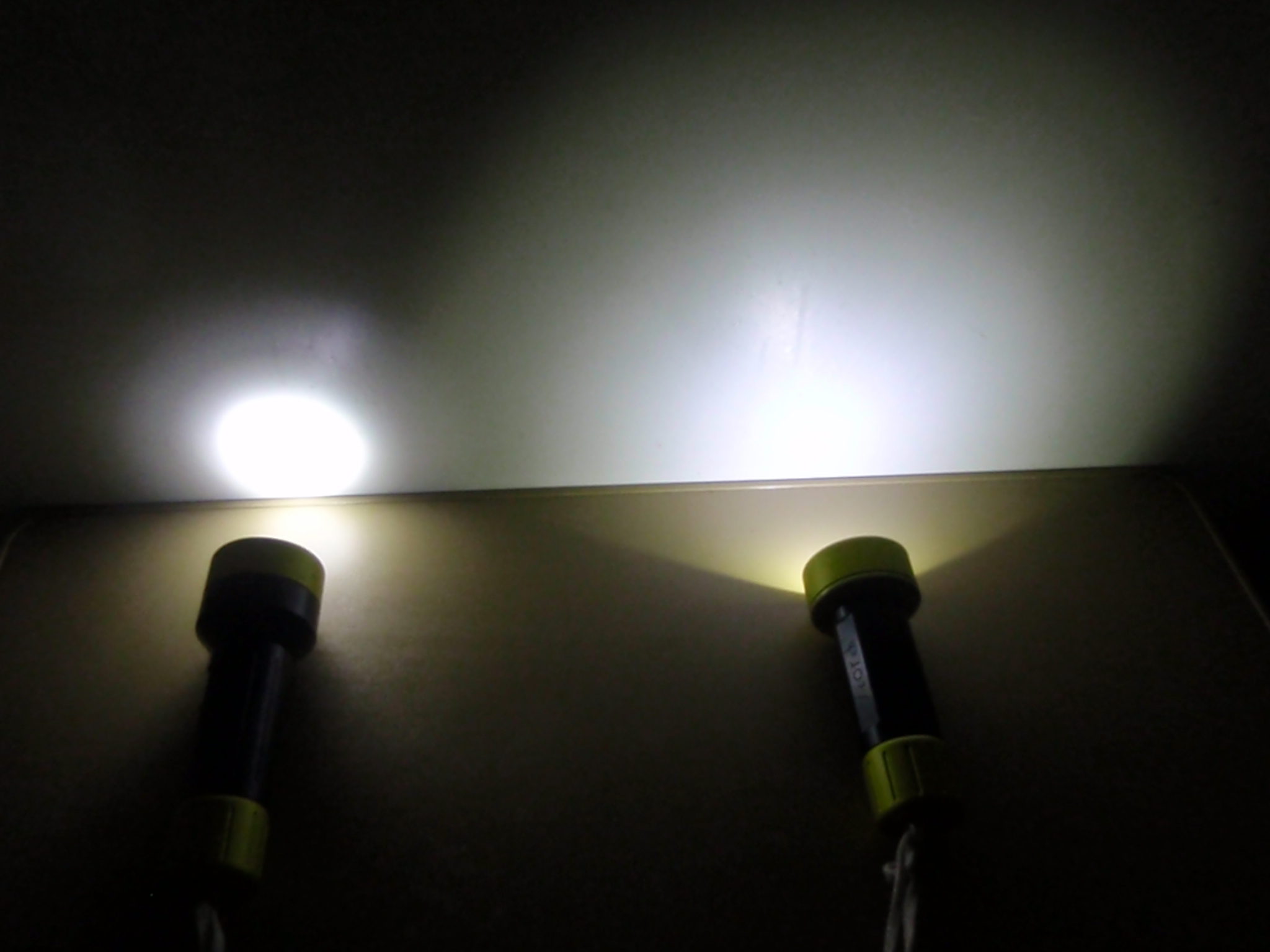
Beam angle comparison between two dive lights with the same LED; with lens on left and without lens on right

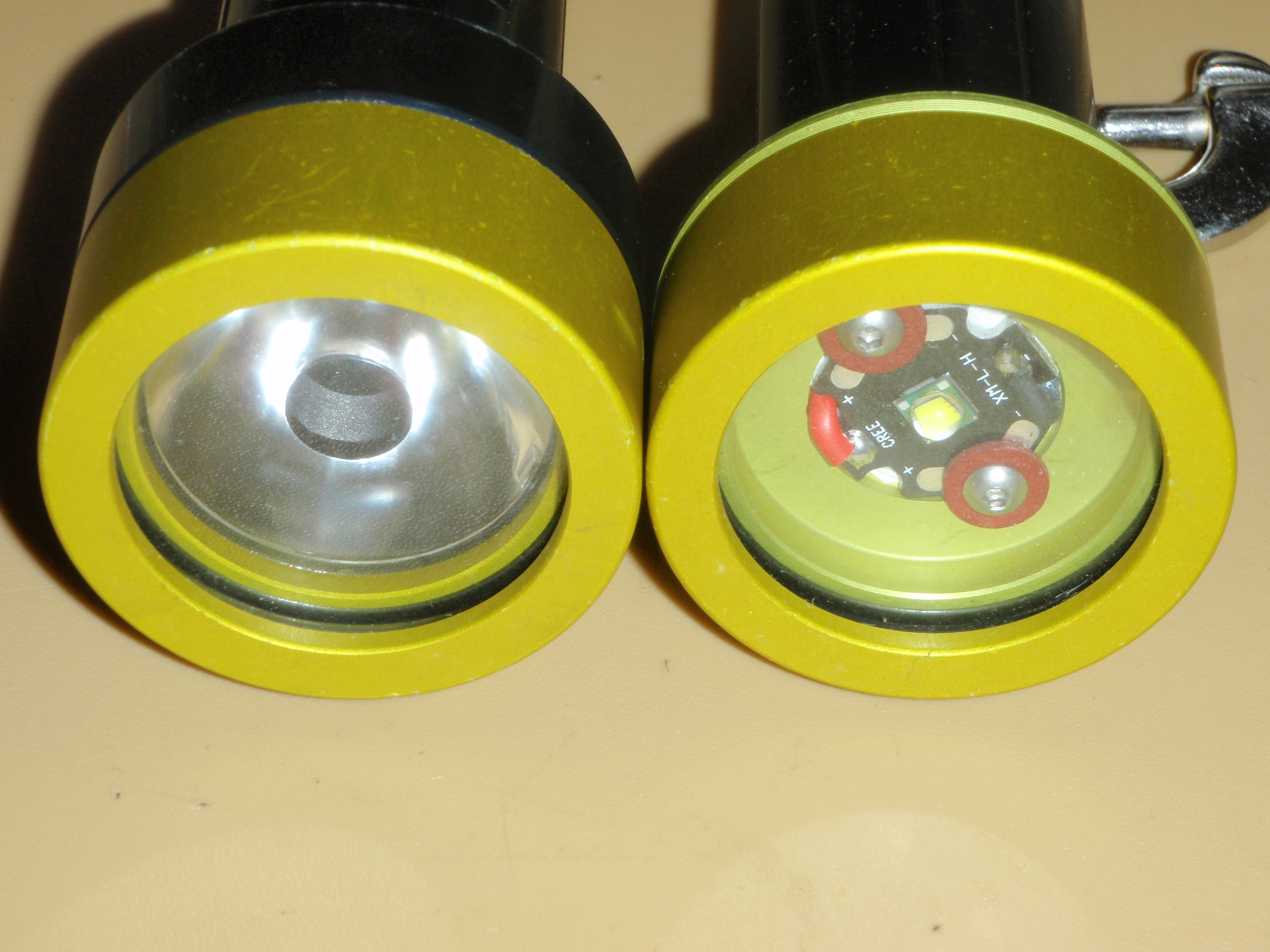
Comparison between two dive lights with the same LED; with lens on left and without lens on right

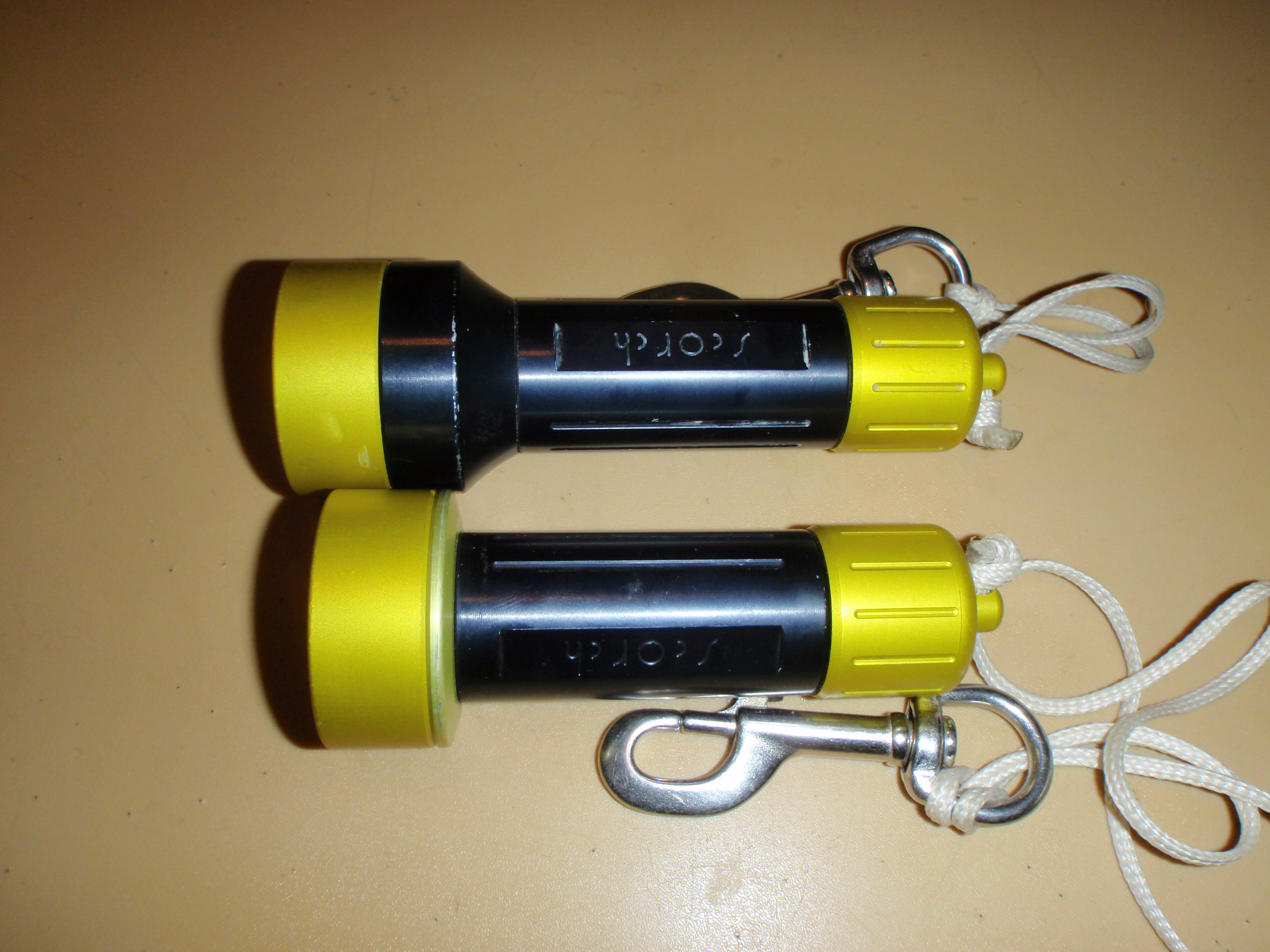
Two dive lights with the same LED; with lens upper and without lens lower. Both are switched on by screwing the back end cover clockwise to close an internal contact.

== Function ==
Primary, backup, video light

=== Primary ===
Usually a powerful light suited to the planned activity of the dive, with sufficient power and suitable beam angle. The beam angle and light output required depend on the objectives of the dive.

=== Backup ===
Backup lights are carried in case the primary light fails during the dive. This is particularly important in cave and wreck penetration diving, where the light is required to facilitate navigation out of the enclosed space. Cave divers are trained to carry three dive lights as a result of an accident analysis by Sheck Exley published in 1977.

=== Video lights ===
Video lights are a special application. They are generally not important for dive safety, but are required for the video camera to get an acceptable image quality, either for video recording, or for the surface team to monitor the work done by the diver. Modern underwater video lights are now relatively small, have run times of 45–60 minutes and output 600–8000 lumens. These LED lights are powered by Lithium-ion batteries and usually have a 5600 K (daylight) color temperature.

== Travel ==
There may be restrictions on transport of dive lights and their batteries by air, due to fire hazards, particularly with larger lithium batteries. In most cases the batteries should be removed and stored in electrically insulated containers, or have their terminals taped over, so they cannot short circuit and overheat.

== Magnesium torch ==
A type of single use underwater lighting source that was in limited use during the 1950s is the magnesium torch, a pyrotechnic device using magnesium metal that could be ignited and would burn underwater. It produced a bright white all-round light, and once activated would continue to burn until exhausted. They also produced large volumes of hydrogen gas, which could be hazardous when mixed with exhaled breathing gas, and together could form an explosive mixture if trapped in a confined space.

== Gallery of dive lights (temporary) ==
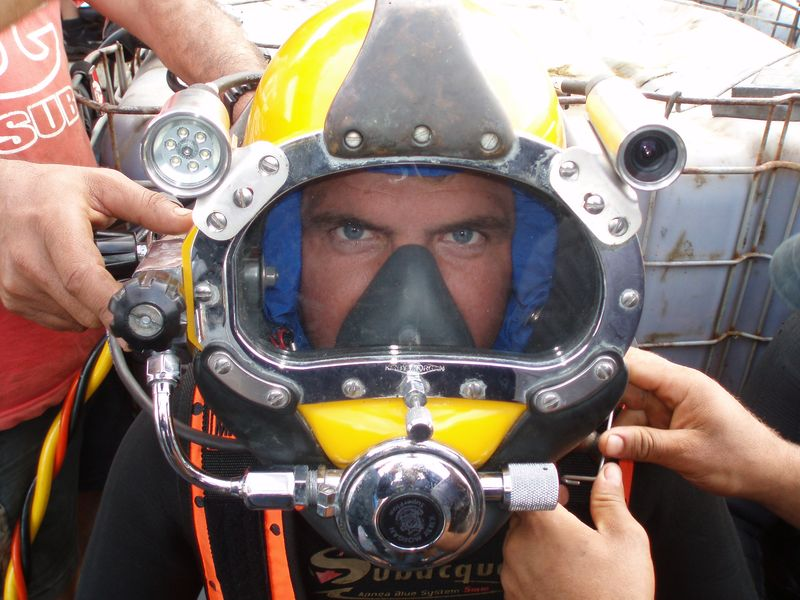
Surface supplied light head and closed circuit video camera on Kirby-Morgan 17 helmet.

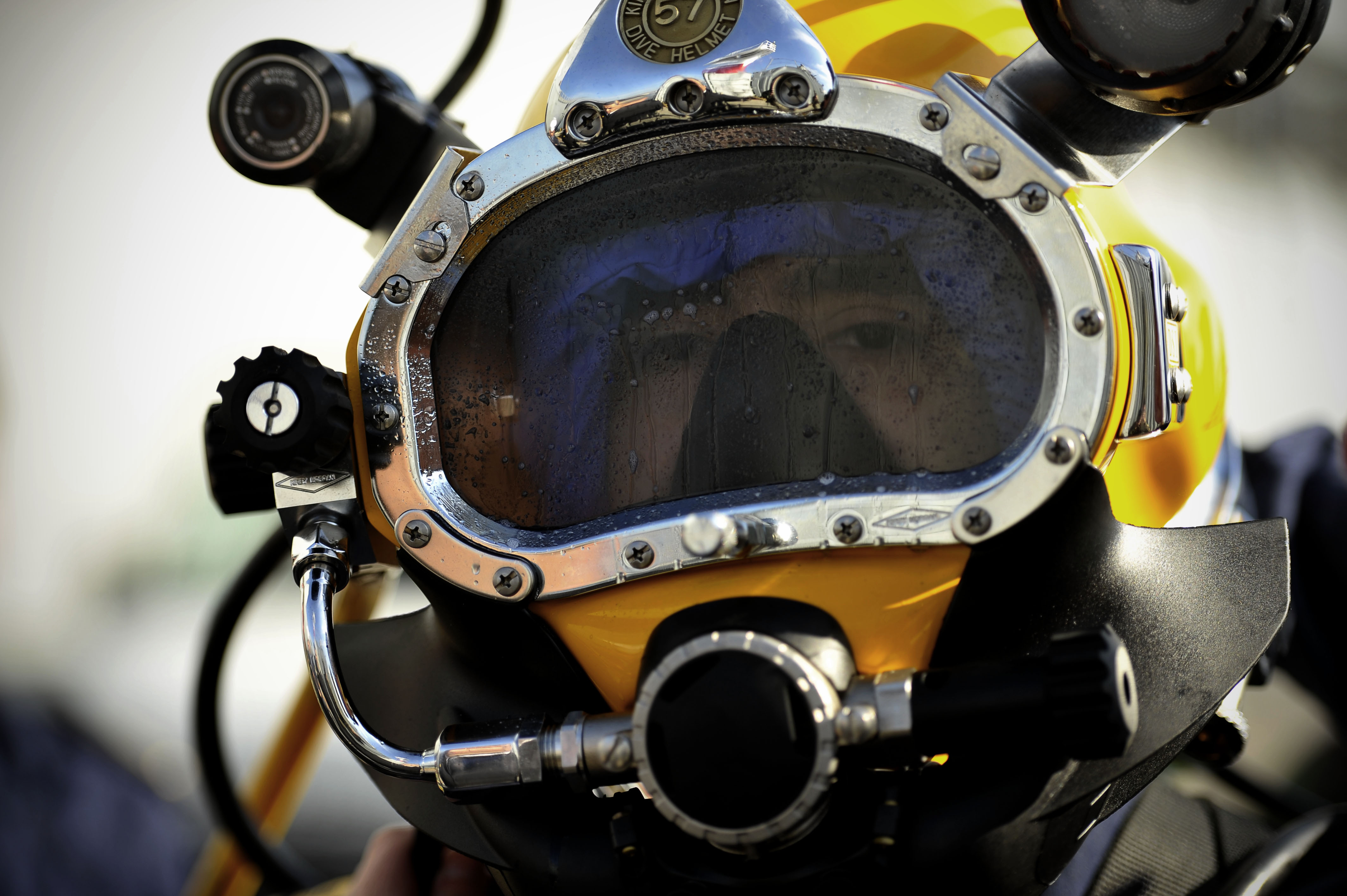
Surface supplied light head and closed circuit video camera on Kirby-Morgan 57 helmet.

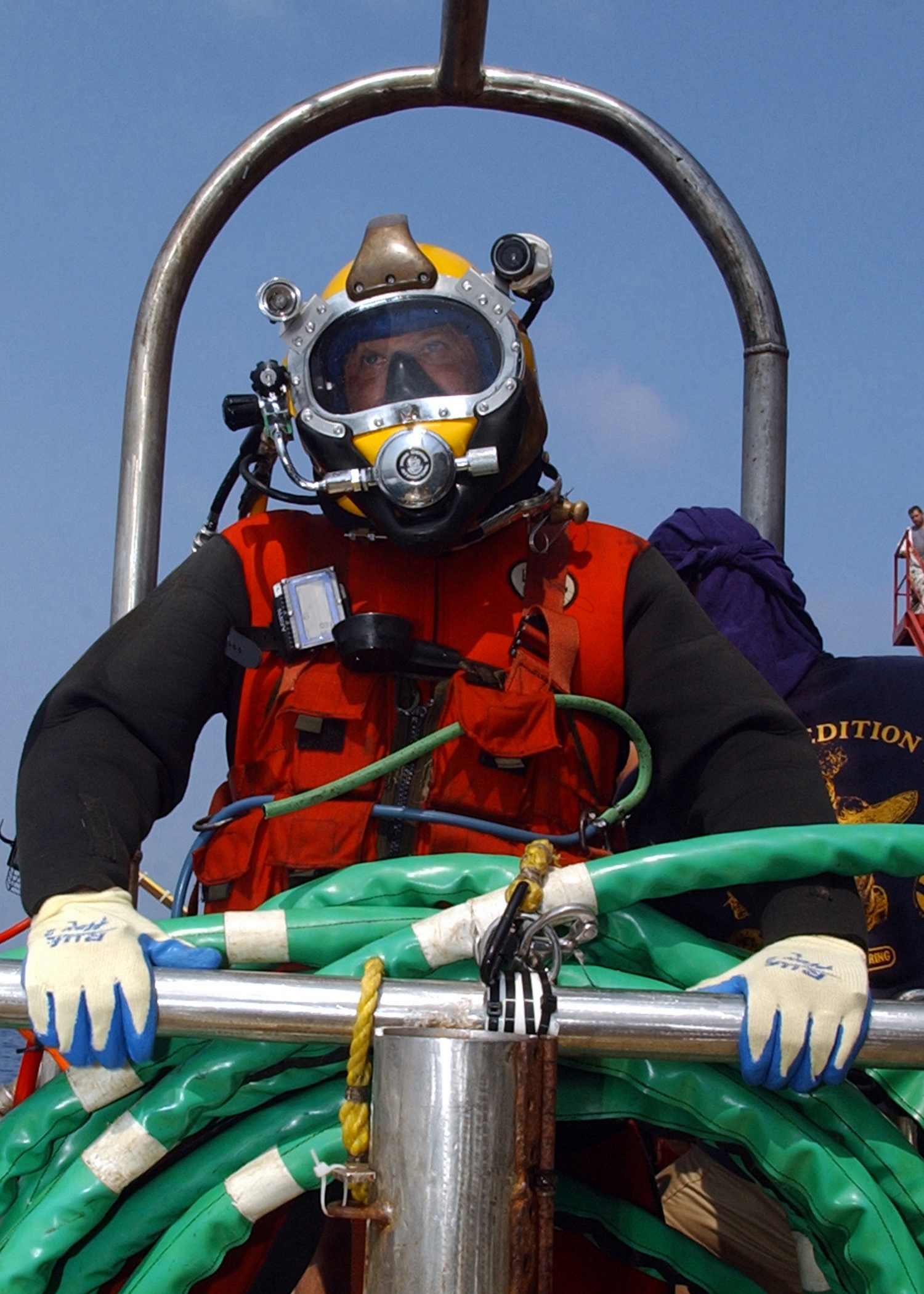
Surface supplied light head and closed circuit video camera on Kirby-Morgan 17 helmet.

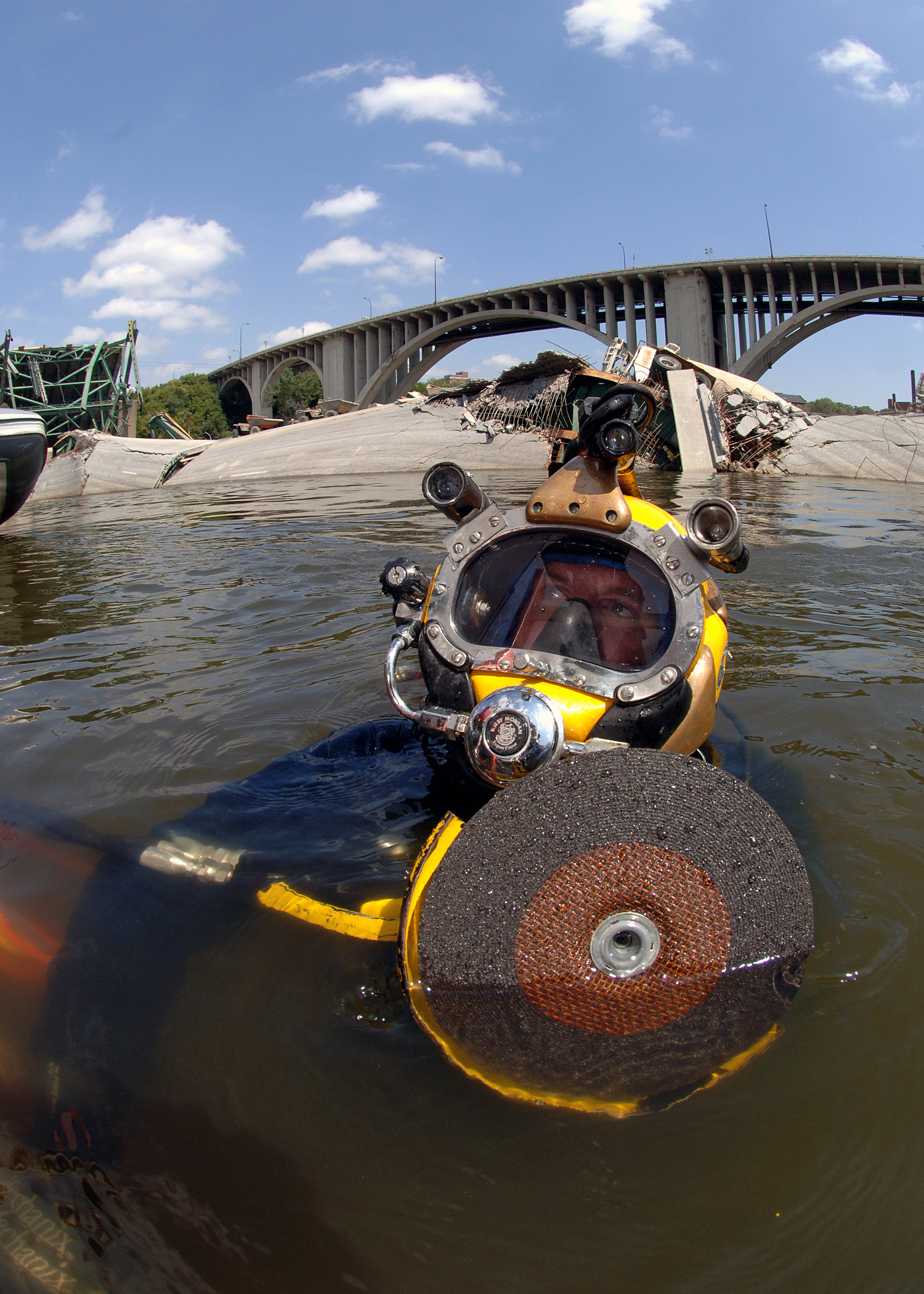
Surface supplied light head and closed circuit video camera on Kirby-Morgan 17 helmet.

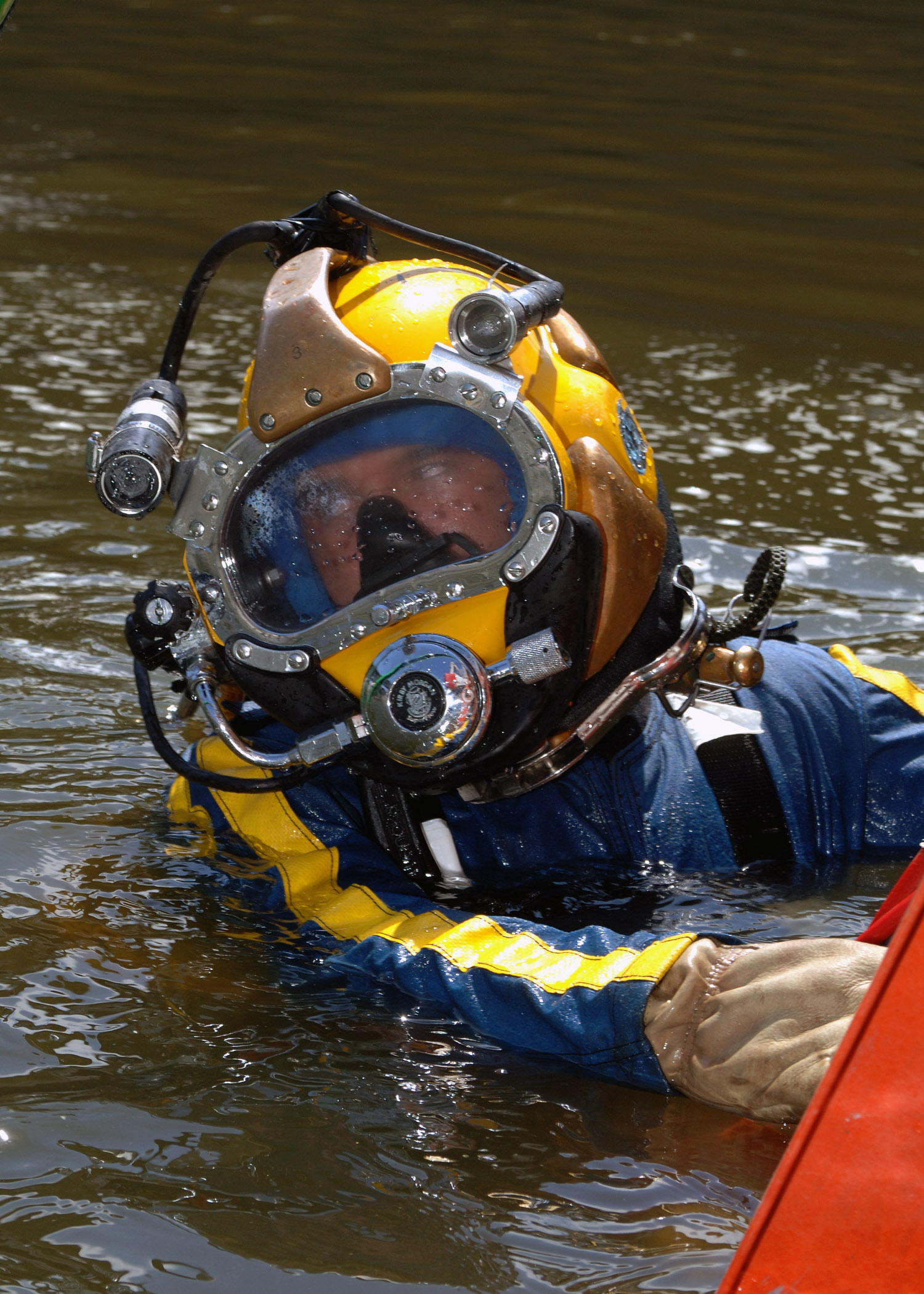
Surface supplied light head and closed circuit video camera on Kirby-Morgan 17 helmet.

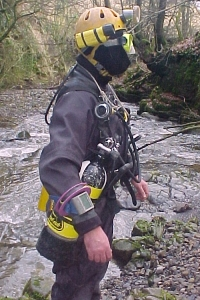
Side view of caving head light and small one-piece lights attached to caving helmet for shallow cave dives.

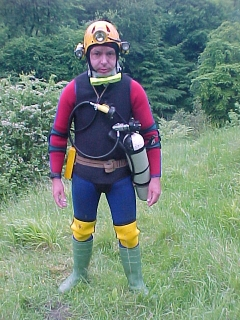
Front view of caving head light and small one-piece lights attached to caving helmet for shallow cave dives.

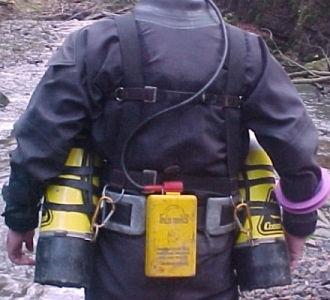
Yellow battery canister for caving head light carried on back of sidemount harness.

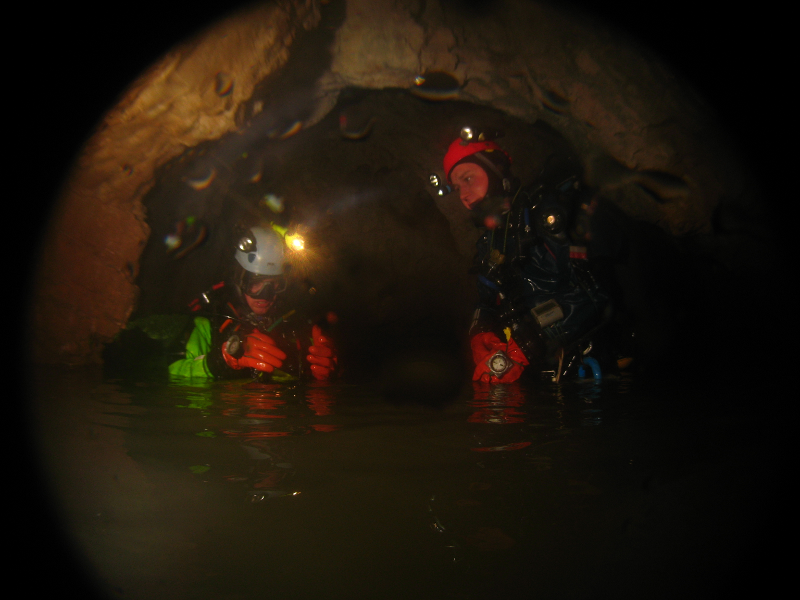
Cave divers with head mounted lights.

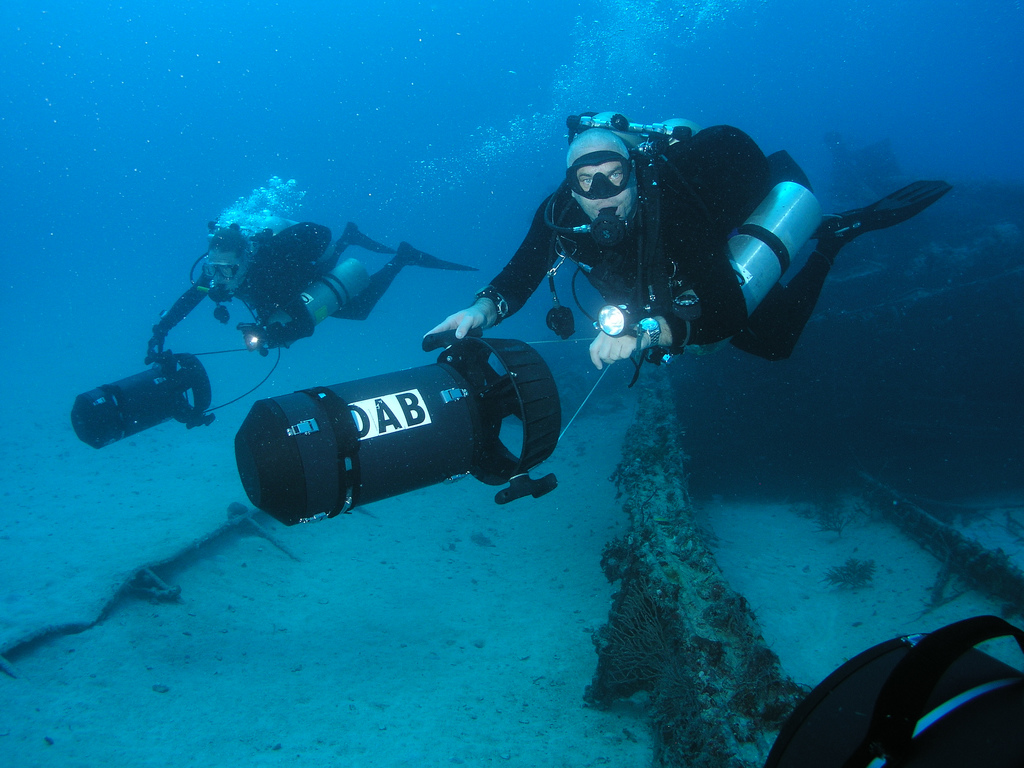
Divers with canister lights using Goodman handles

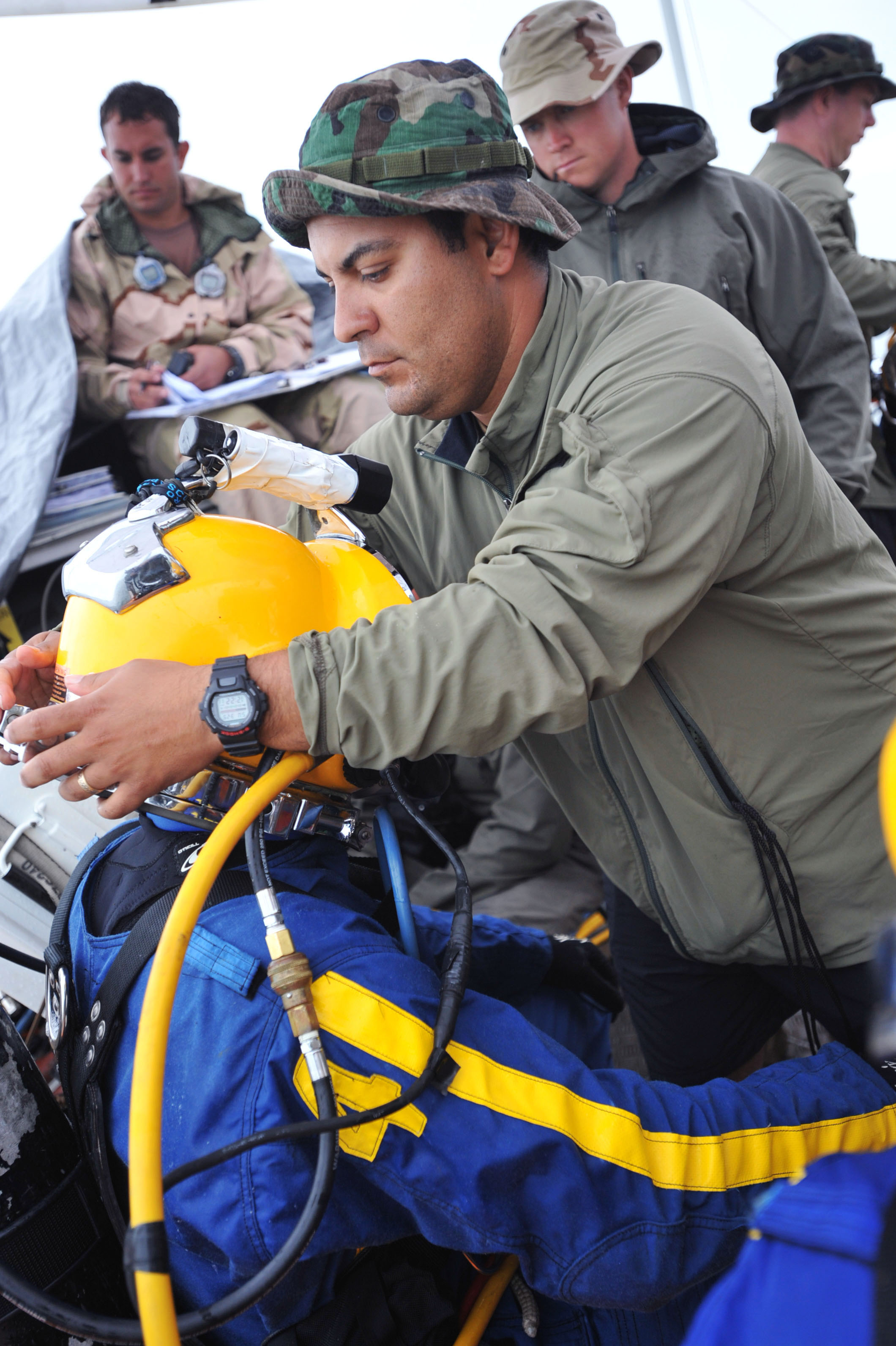
Dive light taped to helmet handle
