= Kilsby sinkhole =

Sinkhole in Mount Gambier, Southern Australia

Kilsby Hole
- Kilsby Cave
- Location within South Australia
- Location: Sisters Road, Moorak South Australia, 5291, Australia
- Coordinates: 37°53′33″S 140°40′35″E
- Geology: Miocene limestone
- Visitors: Yes

The Kilsby sinkhole is a sinkhole located near Mount Gambier in South Australia. Since the late 1960s, the naturally occurring karst sinkhole has been used for recreational diving as well as civilian and police diver training. By visiting the Kilsby Sinkhole website, public can now access the site via a pre booked Sinkhole Tour or Snorkelling Tour.

== History ==
The sinkhole is located on private property owned by the Kilsby family since the late 19th century. Due to insurance and liability concerns, access to the site is highly controlled. Some commercial dive companies teach diving at the site, and limited independent recreational diving and snorkelling is allowed.

In the late 1960s cave and sinkhole diving gained popularity in the area, leading to frequent dives of inexperienced divers at the Kilsby sinkhole. On April 6, 1969, two such inexperienced divers died at the Kilsby sinkhole. Later that year, and until at least 1983, the Australian Department of Defence took on an exclusive lease on the sinkhole and did not allow public access or recreational diving. In the 1970s the site was used to test the Barra Sonobuoy, a classified submarine detection buoy. The sinkhole has been consistently used to train police divers of the South Australian Police since the early 1980s.

== Diving deaths ==
Since 1969 there has been three divers die diving the sinkhole. In 1969 two divers died while diving there. In 2010 a diver died when he became entangled in a cable 37 metres below the water's surface.
