= List of Romano-British pottery =

Romano-British Pottery was produced from the 1st through the 5th centuries AD in Britain, during the period of occupation by the Roman Empire. Before the invasion of the Romans, pottery in Britain was handmade and fired in a bonfire. The Romans introduced the new technology of fast potters wheels and kilns for firing. The newer manufacturing methods resulted in a pottery that was different from the previous period's pottery. Wheel thrown pottery ceased to be produced after the end of Roman rule in Britain. Romano-British pottery has a thinner, harder and smoother fabric than both Iron Age (800 BC–100 AD) and Anglo-Saxon pottery (500–1066 AD).

== List of Romano-British pottery ==
This is a partial list of Romano-British pottery.

| Pottery Name | Time period | Characteristics | Origin | Image |
|---|---|---|---|---|
| Black-burnished ware | 2nd to 4th centuries CE | Two classes of wares: I and II | Dorset area and Thames Estuary | |
| Crambeck Ware | 4th century AD | One of two main Romano-British pottery industries in Yorkshire | Crambeck, Yorkshire | |
| Dales ware | 3rd to 4th centuries AD | Used often as burial urns | South Yorkshire and Lincolnshire | |
| Hadham Red ware | 2nd to 4th centuries AD | Used often as burial urns | Cambridgeshire | |
| Huntcliff ware | 4th to early 5th centuries AD | Used often as burial urns | East Yorkshire | |
| Nene Valley Colour Coated Ware | 2nd to 4th centuries AD | Barbotine-type decoration | Lower Nene Valley | |
| Oxfordshire colour coated ware | 3rd to 4th centuries AD | Produced in Oxfordshire, distributed across Britain | Oxfordshire | |
| Vectis ware | 2nd to 5th centuries AD | Production began prior to Roman occupation | Isle of Wight | |

== See also ==
- Ancient Roman Pottery
- Roman Britain
- List of English medieval pottery
