= Crambeck Ware =

Historic pottery style

Crambeck Ware is a type of Romano-British ceramic produced in North Yorkshire primarily in the 4th century AD.

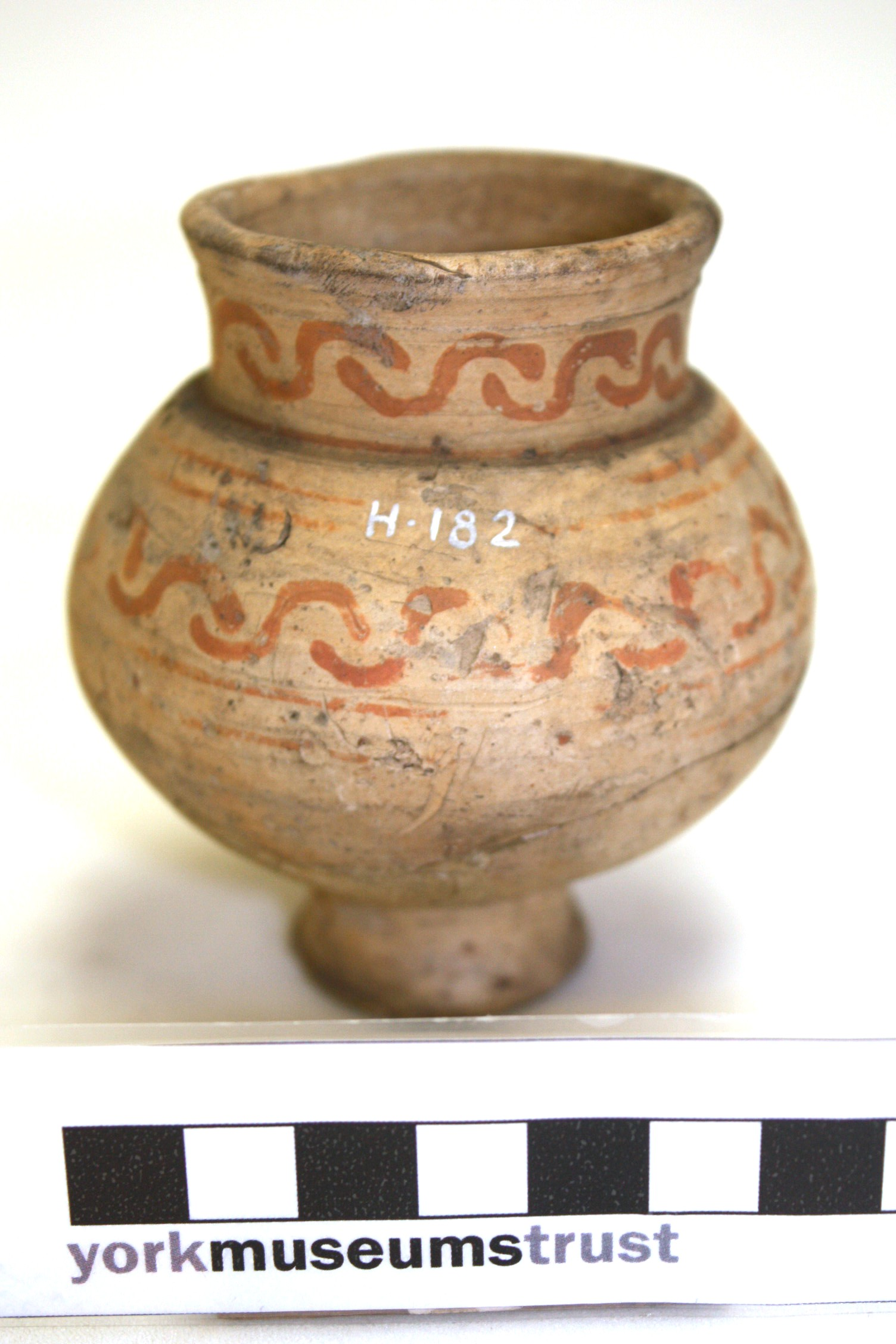
Pedestal beaker jar in Crambeck Parchment Ware. In the Yorkshire Museum

== Site ==
The Crambeck Ware industry takes its name from the nearby village of Crambeck (located 8 km from Malton and 24 km from York). The Roman kilns on this site are now a scheduled monument.

=== Early investigations ===
Pottery associated with six kilns was discovered in the mid 19th century during the construction of Crambeck School. An article in the Malton Messenger of 13 February 1858 identified chance discoveries of Roman pottery on this site.

=== Corder's excavations ===
Initial excavation was undertaken by Philip Corder and students of Bootham School on 2 October 1926, with additional excavations in summer and autumn of 1927. Four kilns were identified between 1926 and 1927. Subsequent investigations have revealed a complex pattern of small enclosures within which the remains of kilns survive. As well as the kilns and waste dumps the complex also included clay dumps, fuel stores, drying areas, stores, workshops and possibly accommodation for the workforce.

=== Industry ===
The Crambeck Ware industry is one of two major pottery industries located in the Yorkshire region during the Roman period (the other being Huntcliff ware). Very little Crambeck Ware is found south of the Humber, though it does advance North to the frontier.

The kilns excavated in the 1928 and 1936 investigations were all circular with a limestone built flue.

== Crambeck fabrics ==
There are three main fabrics associated with the Crambeck Ware industry: Grey Ware, Red Ware and 'Parchment' Ware. Of these, the principal fabric is the Grey Ware and this was in production by AD280. All the Crambeck fabrics are united by a fine clay matrix with sparse silver mica containing varying quantities of quartz and iron-rich inclusions, while the mortaria have slag trituration grits.

=== Grey Ware ===
A hard fine-textured fabric; very pale grey core (sometimes almost white) with medium grey surfaces; abundant inclusions of fine quartz sand. Frequent smooth wheel-burnishing on surfaces. Wheel-thrown.

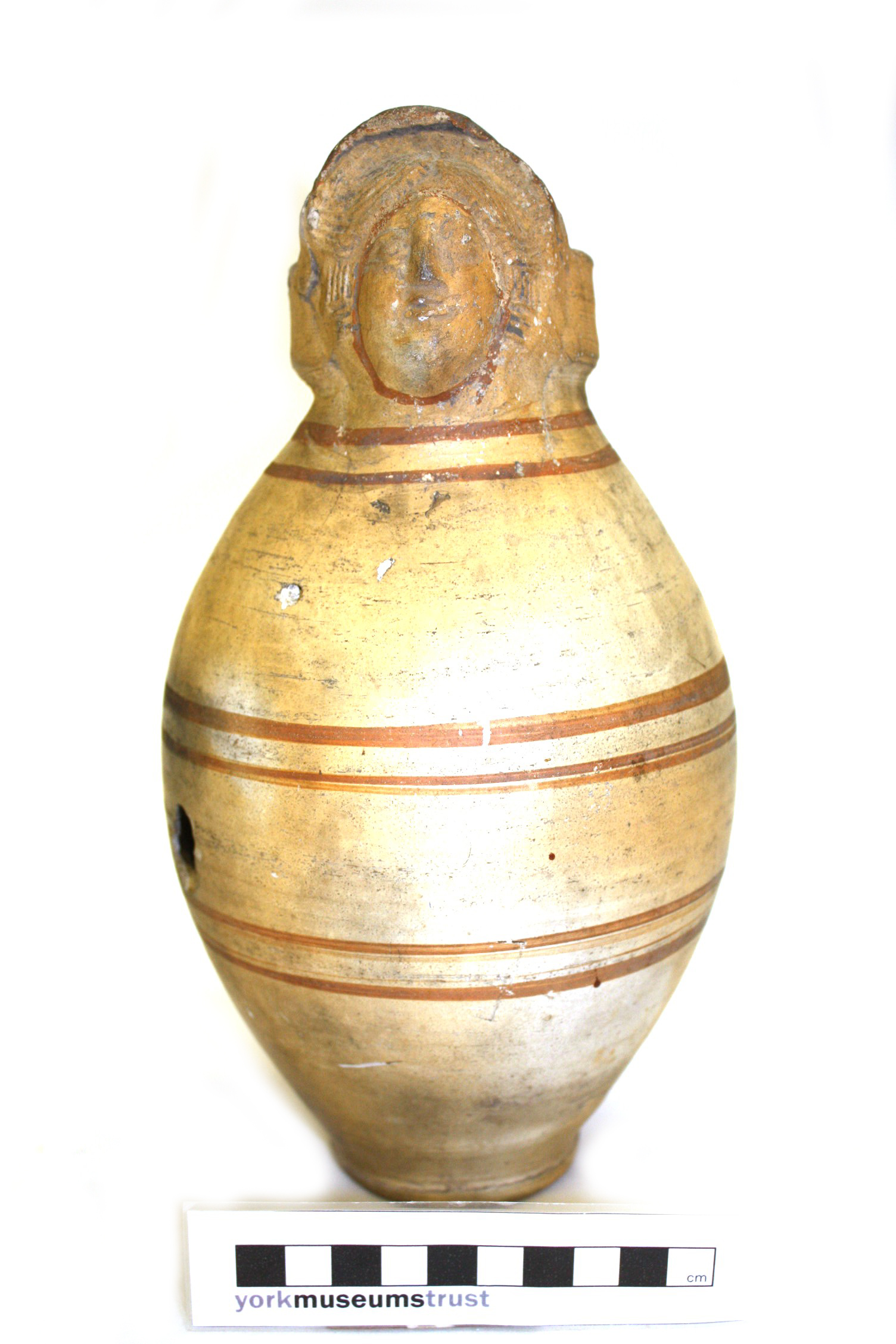
Cremation jar in Crambeck Parchment Ware decorated with a human face. In the Yorkshire Museum

=== Parchment Ware ===
'Parchment' ware: a variable group of hard, brittle, white, buff (through to yellow or orange) fabrics with a laminar fracture; abundant fine sand tempering. Frequent orange or brown painted decoration. Iron slag grits on the mortaria. Crambeck Parchment Ware is frequently over-painted with red designs, often in circumferential bands but also used in geometric patterns, dots, diagonals, and also to depict human features on stylised face pots.

=== Red Ware ===
Red ware: soft fabric with orange core and burnished orange-red surfaces; variable quantities of sand and soft red-brown inclusions.

== Institutions ==
The following institutions are listed as having Crambeck Ware collections:

- Corbridge Roman Site Museum
- Malton Museum
- Scunthorpe Museum
- Yorkshire Museum, York

== See also ==
- Philip Corder
- Dales ware
- Huntcliff ware
- Ancient Roman Pottery
- List of Romano-British pottery
