= Nene Valley (disambiguation) =

Nene Valley may refer to:

== Places ==
Australia

- Nene Valley (South Australia), a valley
  - Nene Valley, South Australia, a locality
  - Nene Valley Conservation Park, a protected area in South Australia

United Kingdom

- A valley associated with the River Nene

== Other ==
- Nene Valley (1852), a ship wrecked in South Australia
- Nene Valley Colour Coated Ware, Romano-British ceramic produced from the mid-2nd to 4th centuries AD
- Nene Valley Railway, a heritage railway in the United Kingdom
