= Lindum Colonia =

Settlement founded by ancient Romans in eastern England

- Lindum, Colonia Domitiana Lindensium
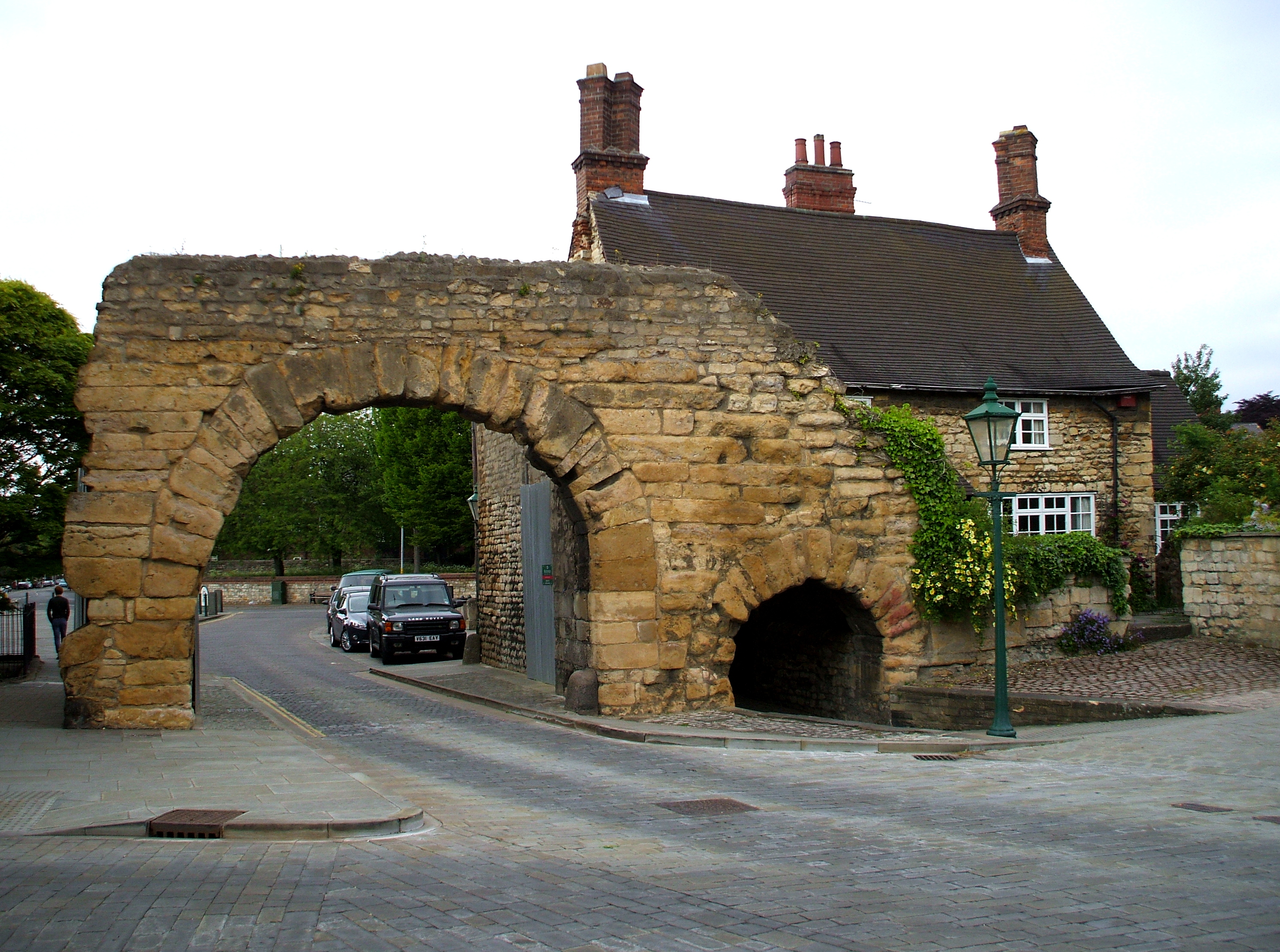
- The Newport Arch is a surviving part of the north gate to the Upper City.

- Location within England Location within Lincolnshire
- 53°14′02″N 00°32′17″W
- Type: Settlement
- Periods: Roman Imperial
- Location: Lincoln, Lincolnshire, England
- Region: Britannia

History
- Built: Around 80 AD
- Built by: Domitian
- Abandoned: End of the 5th century

Lindum Colonia was the Roman settlement which is now the City of Lincoln in Lincolnshire. It was founded as a Roman Legionary Fortress during the reign of the Emperor Nero (58–68 AD) or possibly later. Evidence from Roman tombstones suggests that Lincoln was first garrisoned by the Ninth Legion Hispana, which probably moved from Lincoln to found the fortress at York around c. 71 AD. Lindum was then garrisoned by the Second Legion Adiutrix, which then went on to Chester in 77–78 AD.

Probably under the reign of Domitian and most likely after 86 AD, the fortress became a colonia, a settlement for retired soldiers sanctioned by the Emperor. The colonia now developed and a second enclosure, often referred to as the Lower Colonia was added between the Upper Colonia and the River Witham. Evidence has been uncovered for the Forum, baths, temples, buildings and shops of the colonia which was enclosed by walls. The walls of the Upper Colonia started to be built in the earlier part of the 2nd century, while the Lower Colonia was walled in either the late 2nd or early 3rd centuries. The Roman settlement also spread to the south of the river Witham in the area known as the Wigford. In the early 3rd century with the re-organisation of the Roman Empire, a case can be made that Lindum Colonia had become the provincial capital of Britannia Secunda and possibly a Bishop from Lincoln was present at the Council of Arles in 314 AD. In the 4th century Lincoln continued to develop and there is increasing evidence for Christianity. After the departure of the Romans in the 5th century Lindum declined in size and population, although archaeological evidence suggests some degree of continuity.

== Name ==
The name is a Latinized form of a native Brittonic name which has been reconstructed as *Lindon (lit. "pool" or "lake"; cf. modern Welsh llyn). The primary evidence that modern Lincoln was referred to as Lindum comes from Ptolemy's Geography, which was compiled in about 150 AD, where Lindum is referred to as a polis or town within the tribal area of the Corieltauvi. In the Antonine Itinerary, a road book of the mid-2nd century AD, Lindum is mentioned three times as Lindo in the Iter or routes numbered V, VI and VIII. Then, in the Ravenna Cosmography, a listing of towns in the Roman Empire compiled in the 7th century AD, Lincoln is referred to as Lindum Colonia. As the Roman colonia for veteran soldiers at Lincoln is thought to have been established during the reign of the Roman Emperor Domitian (81–96), it has been suggested that the full name of the colonia would have been Colonia Domitiana Lindensium, but, as yet, there have been no Roman inscriptions found that confirm this.

== History ==
Groundplan of the walls and gates of Lindum Colonia, over a modern map of Lincoln.

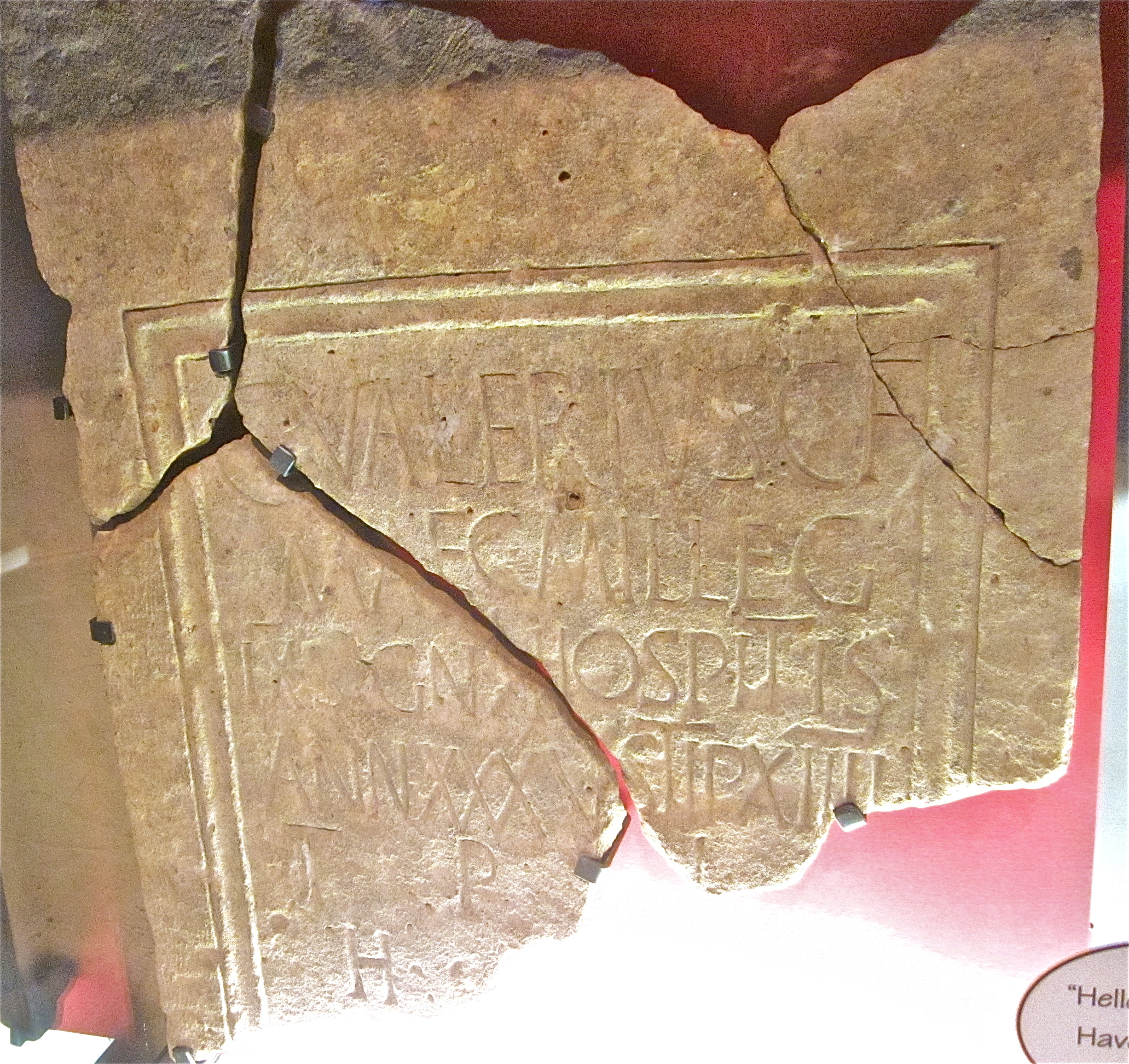
Tombstone of Gaius Valerius, a standard bearer of the Ninth Legion. Found on the South Common, Lincoln (RIB 257)

=== Construction ===
The Romans conquered this part of Britain in AD 48 and shortly afterwards built a legionary fortress, possibly south of the River Witham. This was soon replaced, around the year 60, by a second fort for the Ninth Legion, high on a hill overlooking the natural lake formed by the widening of the River Witham (the modern day Brayford Pool) and at the northern end of the Fosse Way Roman road. That pool is very likely to have given Lincoln its name.

=== Development ===
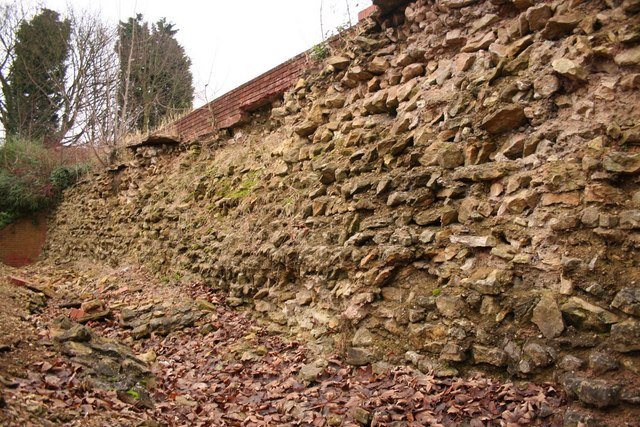
Roman north wall of Lindum Colonia

The Ninth Legion, Hispana was probably moved from Lincoln to found the fortress at York around 71 AD Then, after a probable short occupation by the Second Legion, who had moved to Chester by 77–78 AD the Legionary fort would have been left on a care and maintenance basis. The exact date that it was converted into a colonia is unknown, but a generally favoured date is 86 AD. This was an important settlement for retired legionaries, established by the emperor Domitian within the walls and using the street grid of the hilltop fortress, with the addition of an extension of about equal area, down the hillside to the waterside below. The town became a major flourishing settlement, accessible from the sea both through the River Trent and through the River Witham. Public buildings, such as the forum with lifesize equestrian statues, basilica, and the public baths, were erected in the 2nd century. The hilltop was largely filled with private homes, but the slopes became the town's commercial centre. They gained stone walls, like the upper region (including the Newport Arch), around 200. Between this point, and the city's peak in the early 4th century the town could maintain a population of between six and eight-thousand. There was also an industrial suburb over the river which had pottery production facilities. The town had the best developed sewerage system in the province and a fine octagonal public fountain and part of its aqueduct have been partly uncovered. There were temples dedicated to Apollo and Mercury. On the basis of Lindum's size and the patently corrupt list of British bishops who attended the 314 Council of Arles, the city is sometimes considered to have been the capital of the province of Flavia Caesariensis which was formed during the late-3rd century Diocletian Reforms. However, it is now thought more likely that Lincoln would have been the administrative capital of Britannia Secunda and that York was the capital of Flavia Caesariensis.

=== Decline and transformation ===
The city and its waterways eventually fell into decline, and, by the end of the 5th century, it was virtually deserted. However, the church of St Paul continued as a place of worship until at least 450 and its churchyard was in use into the 6th century. When Saint Paulinus visited in 629, it was apparently under the control of a Praefectus Civitatis called Blecca. Archaeological evidence indicates that a timber apsidal church was probably built either in the 5th or 6th century in the centre of the old forum. This church was large enough to hold around 100 worshippers, challenging the idea that Lincoln was nearly deserted. Instead, it fits with other evidence for Lincoln retaining its central position in the post-Roman polity called *Lindēs, which became the Kingdom of Lindsey in the Anglo-Saxon period.

== Planning, infrastructure, trade and religion ==
=== The Roman water supply ===
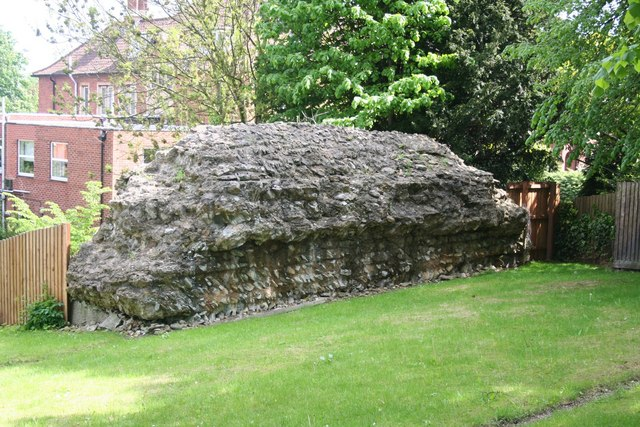
Stretch of Roman Wall at East Bight by the Newport Arch, where there was a water storage tank

Roman Lincoln had a very sophisticated water supply. It was fed by the ‘‘Roaring Meg’’ spring to the North East of the city and then ran parallel with the Nettleham Road towards the N.E corner of the Upper Colonia. The ceramic pipes were encased in concrete that provided a waterproof seal and allowed the water to pass through the pipes under pressure. The course of the aqueduct had been well known from the start of the 18th century. William Stukeley had shown the line of the aqueduct on his plan of Lincoln in 1722. The Lincoln antiquary Thomas Sympson had written in the mid 18th century, "There must have been some contrivance for raising the water a good deal above its natural level before it would run to Lindum; the spring being evidently lower than the Town: and indeed there are some traces of a Tower, or some such building at the end of the Aquaeduct by the Spring, which one may suppose would have had a reservoir on its Top." In 1782 the artist Samuel Hieronymus Grimm drew sections of the sheathed pipe and also where it emerged from the ground at the spring. Over the years further lengths of the aqueduct have been uncovered and the base for a watertank fed by the aqueduct discovered just inside the Roman Wall to the east of the Newport Arch. This is just to the north of Cottesford Place, where excavations in the 1960s revealed a probable Roman Bathhouse, which could have been supplied with water from this source. Another pipeline, encased in concrete was found in 1857 by the Greestone Stairs, to the east of the wall, and this pipeline had presumably branched off from the aqueduct and supplied water to the Lower Colonia. Thompson calculated that it would be necessary to raise the water about 70 feet at the source at the ‘‘Roaring Meg’’ for there to be sufficient pressure for the water to reach the tank at the East Bight by the Newport Arch. This may imply that there was some form of water tower and the Romans may either have used some form of pump or siphon to raise the water, or a revolving bucket and chain system.

Before 2007 it was questioned whether the Roman aqueduct at Lincoln had ever worked as there was no evidence of limescale in any of the lengths of pipe that had been uncovered. Construction on a housing estate close to Nettleham showed that there was limescale, indicating that the aqueduct had been in use. This length of the aqueduct had ceramic pipes, joined with collared joints, but other lengths of the aqueduct had pipes which were about 7.5 inches in diameter, narrowing to 4 inches and when laid, the narrow or spigot end of the pipe fitted into the broad or socket end of the next pipe.

== Industry ==
=== Pottery production ===
Lincoln was an important centre for pottery production. The earliest discovery of a pottery kiln was on the site of the Technical College (now Lincoln College) on Monks Road. This kiln produced Mortaria stamped with the maker's name VITALIS. who was probably working around 90–115 AD. A further discovery was made in 1947 when Graham Webster excavated a kiln site producing gray ware storage jars at Swanpool, to the S.W. of Lincoln. This was followed in 1950 by the excavation of further mortaria kilns found on the Lincoln Racecourse by Phillip Corder. Kilns producing mortaria by a potter called CATTO and also colour painted and rosette decorated pottery are known from South Carlton, to the north of Lincoln. In the 3rd and 4th centuries, Lincolnshire produced a coarse ware ceramic known as Dales ware, which was exported across the north of Roman Britain.

== Roman sculpture and tombstones ==
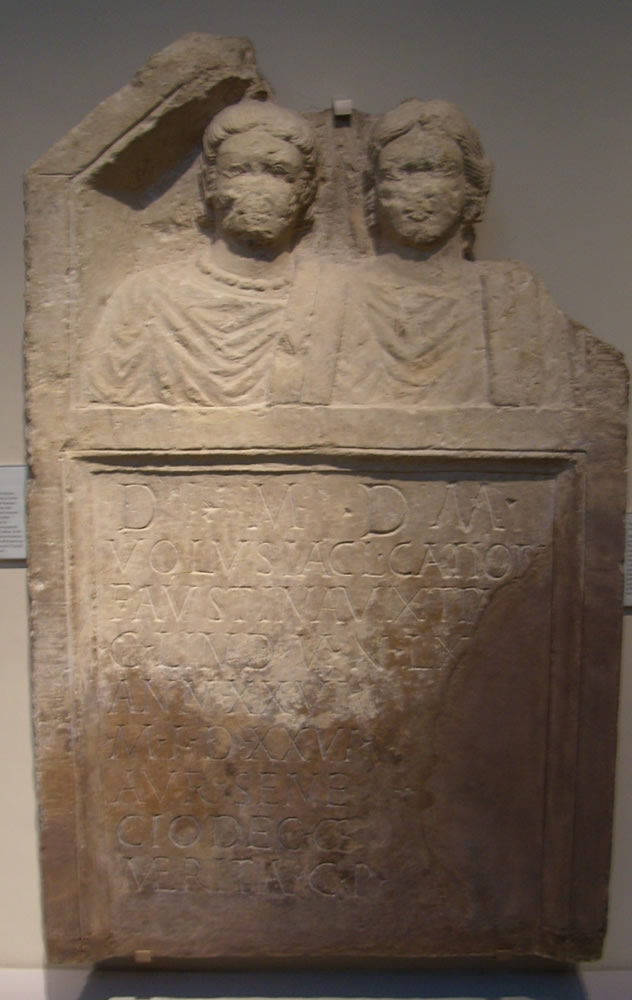
RIB 250 Tombstone of Volusia Faustina and Aurelius Senecio. Found in 1859 in the wall of the Lower Colonia and now in the British Museum.

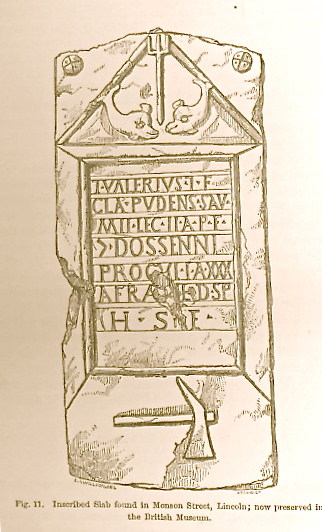
RIB 258 Tombstone of Titus Valerius Pudens of the Second Legion, Adiutrix. Found at No 2 Monson Street in 1849. Now in the British Museum.

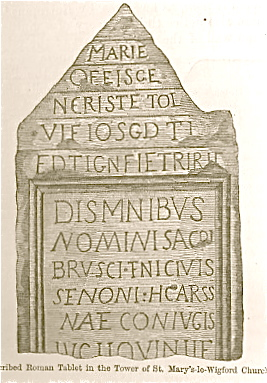
RIB 262 Tombstone of Sacer, son of Bruscus, a citizen of the Senones, set into the church tower of St Mary le Wigford, Lincoln.

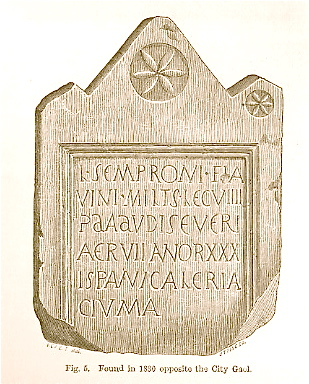
RIB 256 Tombstone of Lucius Sempronius Flavinus of the Ninth Legion, a Spaniard. From 17 Lindum Road, Lincoln.

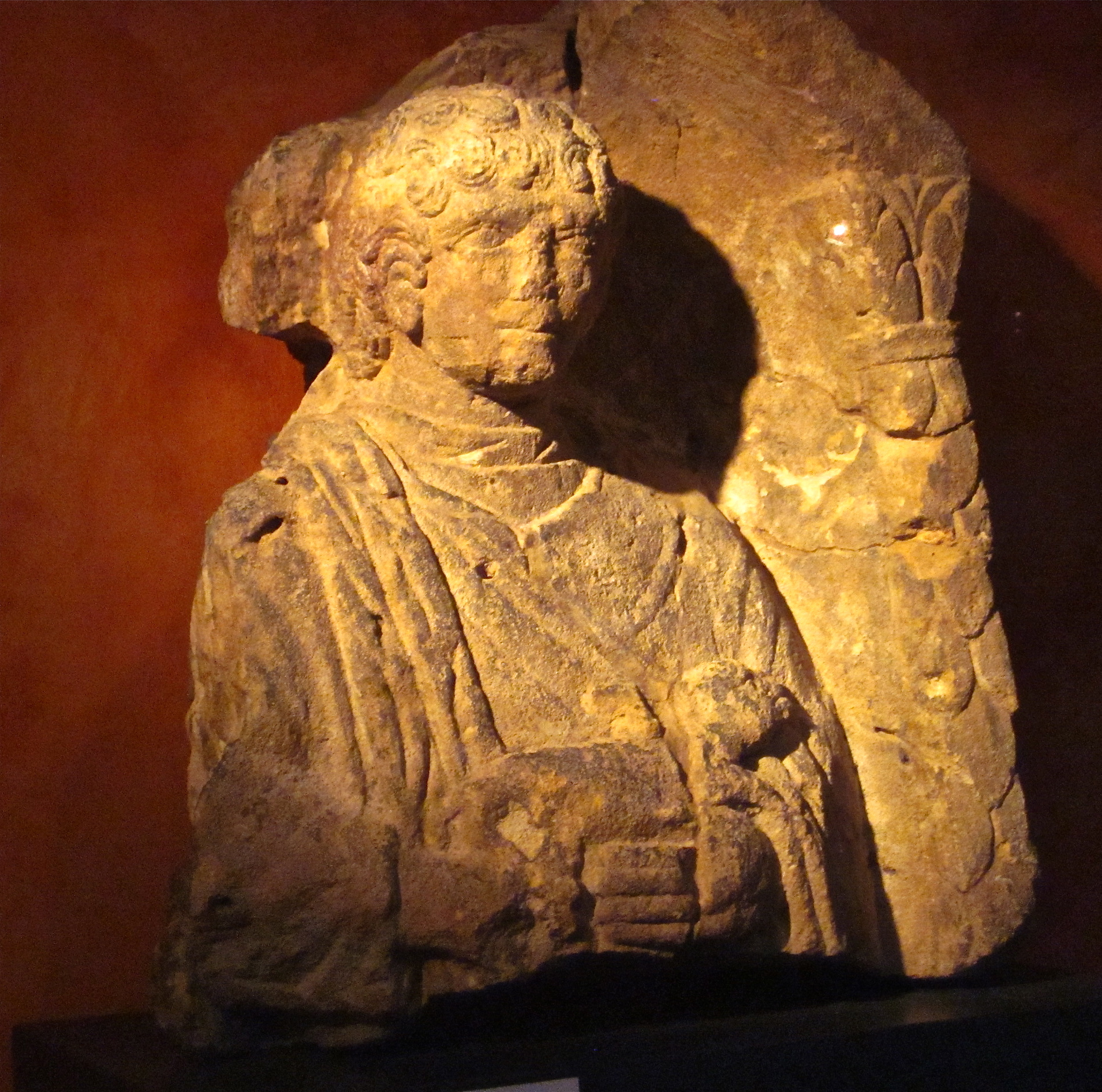
Tombstone of a Boy holding a pet Hare, formerly in Lincoln Cathedral Library.

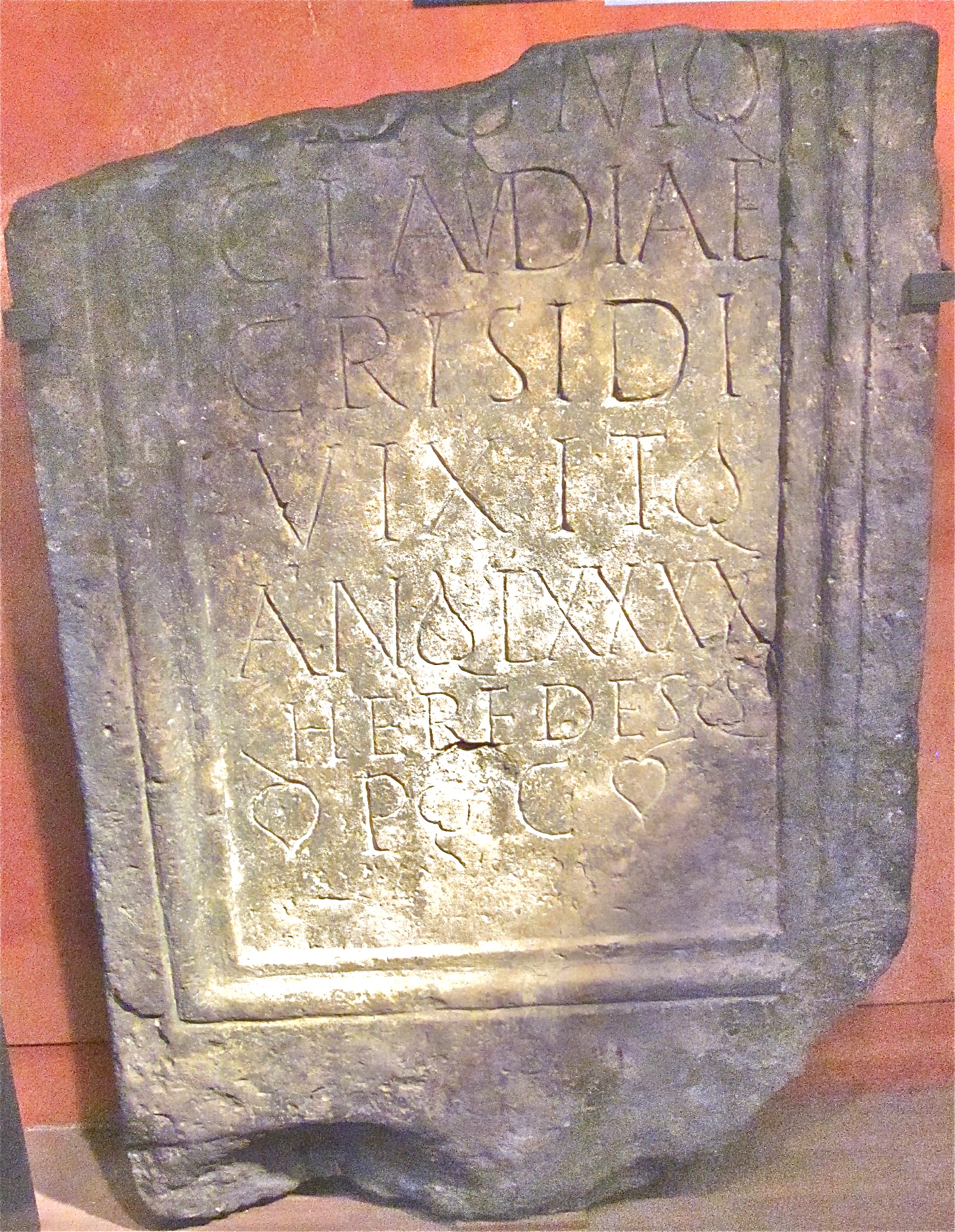
RIB 263 Tombstone of Claudia Crysis, who lived to the age of 90.

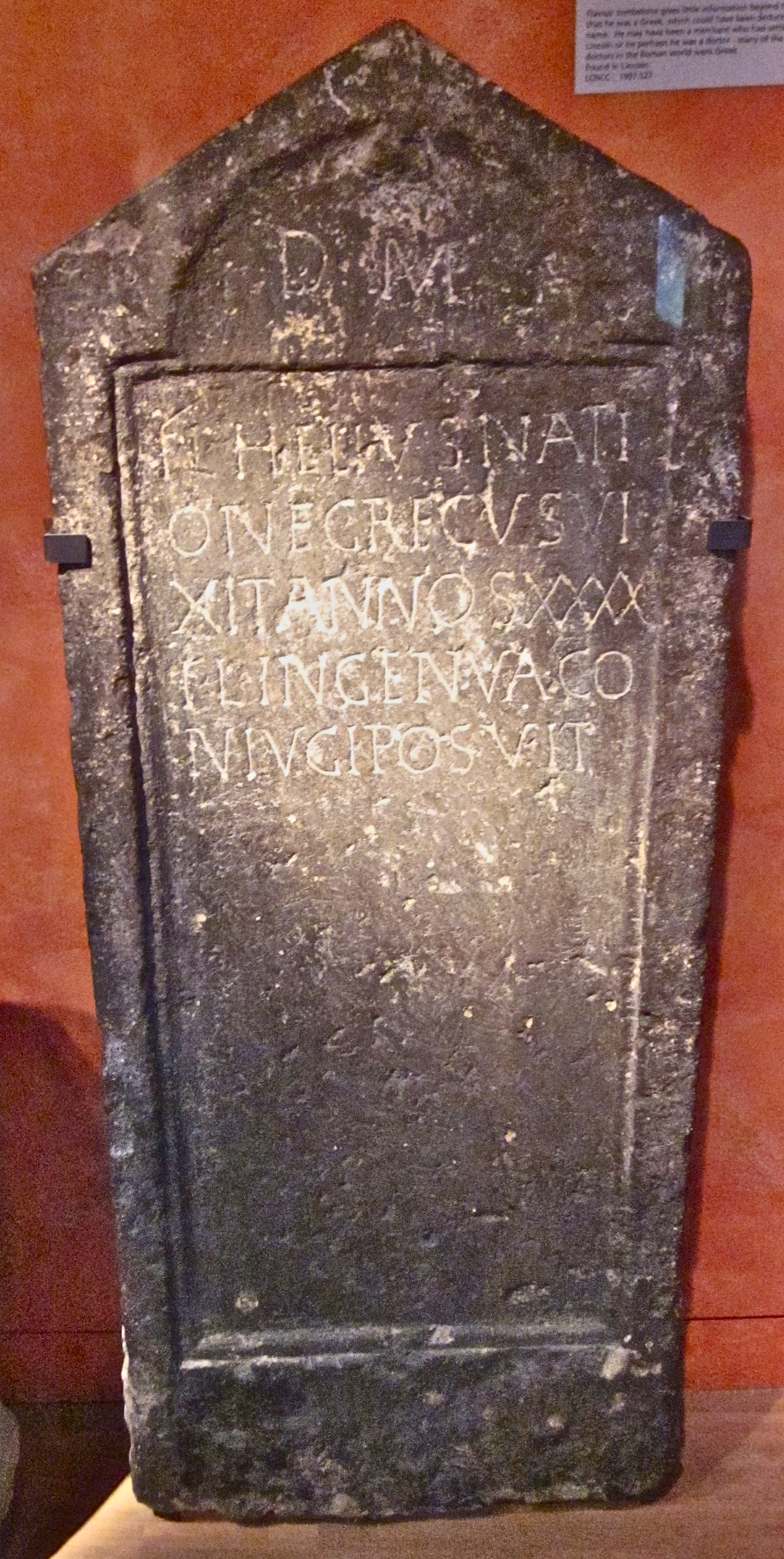
RIB 251 Found in 1785, just to the west of the Newport Arch. Tombstone of Flavius Helius, a Greek by race, lived 40 years. Flavia Ingenua set this up for her husband.

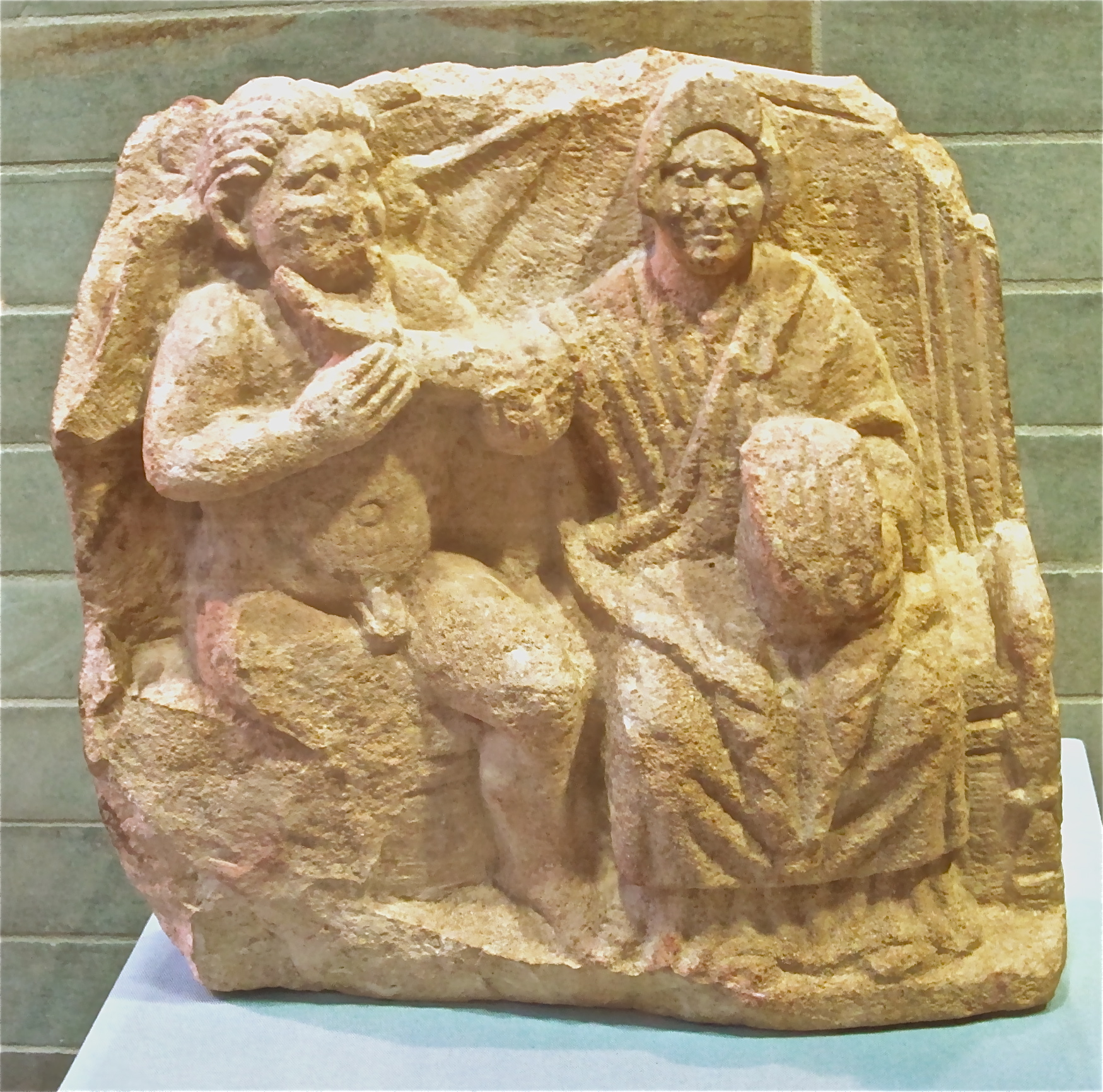
Sculpture of Cupid and Psyche, found in excavations on the Old Cinema Grand Electric site in Hungate, Lincoln in 1985.

== See also ==
- Newport Arch
- Roman Britain
- Legio IX Hispana
- Colonia (Roman)
- List of Roman Sites in Lincolnshire
