= Tombstone of Claudia Crysis =

Romano-British tombstone found at Lincoln

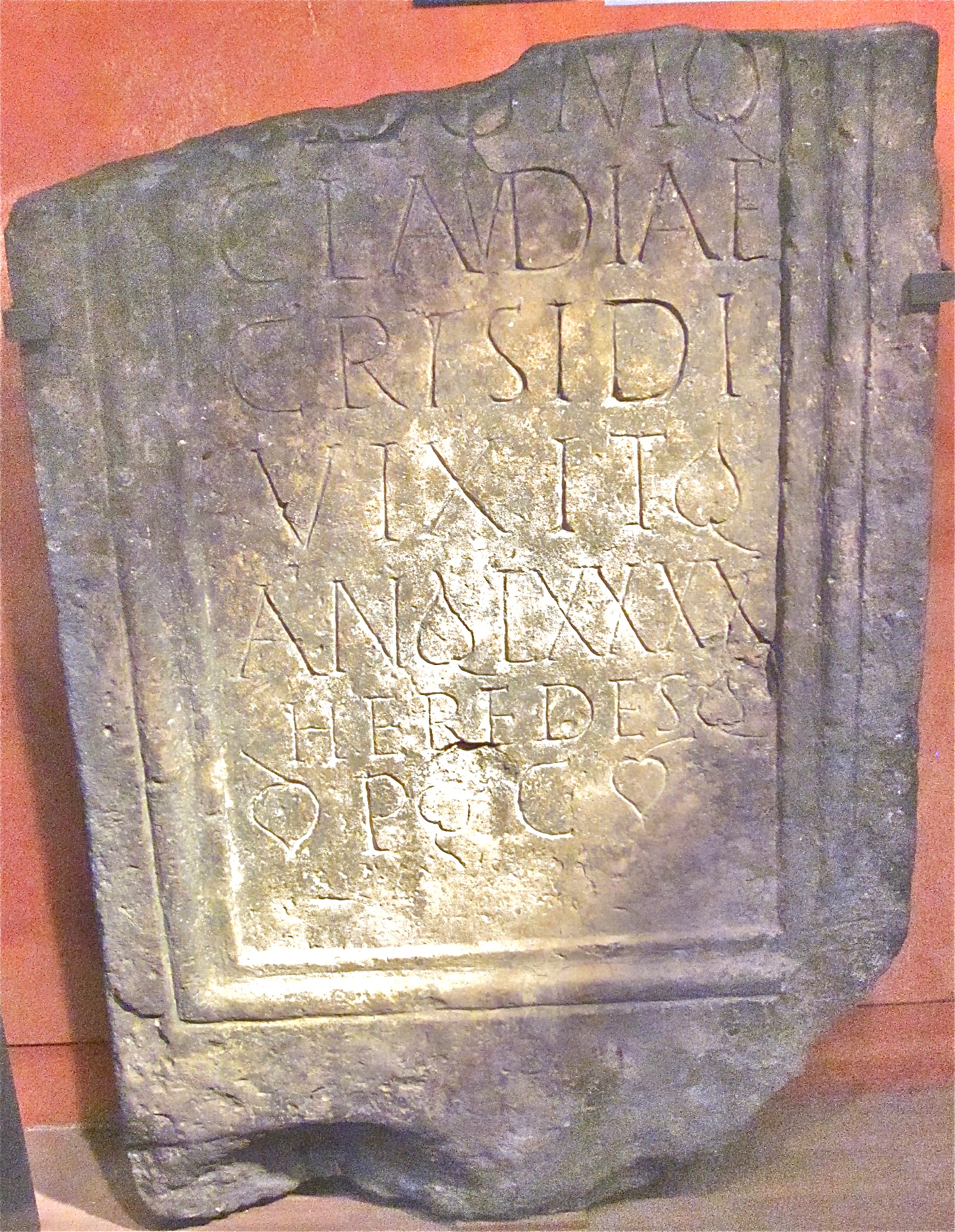
- The tombstone of Claudia Crysis
- Material: Sandstone
- Height: 1.168 m (46.0 in)
- Created: Romano-British, c.1st-4th centuries AD
- Discovered: 1830; Lincoln, UK
- Present location: Lincoln Museum

The Tombstone of Claudia Chrysis is a Romano-British tombstone found at Lindum (Lincoln, UK). It records the life of Claudia Chrysis, who is regarded as Roman Britain's oldest woman.

== Tombstone ==
The tombstone was discovered in 1830 opposite the City Gaol in Lincoln in a property owned by Alderman Colton. The Latin inscription, carved over seven lines reads: "D(is) M(anibus) / Claudiae / Crysidi / vixit / an(nos) LXXXX / heredes / p(onendum) c(uraverunt)". In translation this reads: "To the spirits of the departed (and) to Claudia Crysis; she lived 90 years. Her heirs had this set up."

== Public display ==
After its discovery, Claudia's tombstone was acquired by Charles Sibthorp and then exhibited in 1848 at the Archaeological Institute meeting in Lincoln. He then had it removed to a private collection at Canwick Hall. It was donated to the Lincoln Museum by Charles' grandson, Coningsby Charles Sibthorp, in 1909.
