= Vectis ware =

Isle of Wight iron age pottery

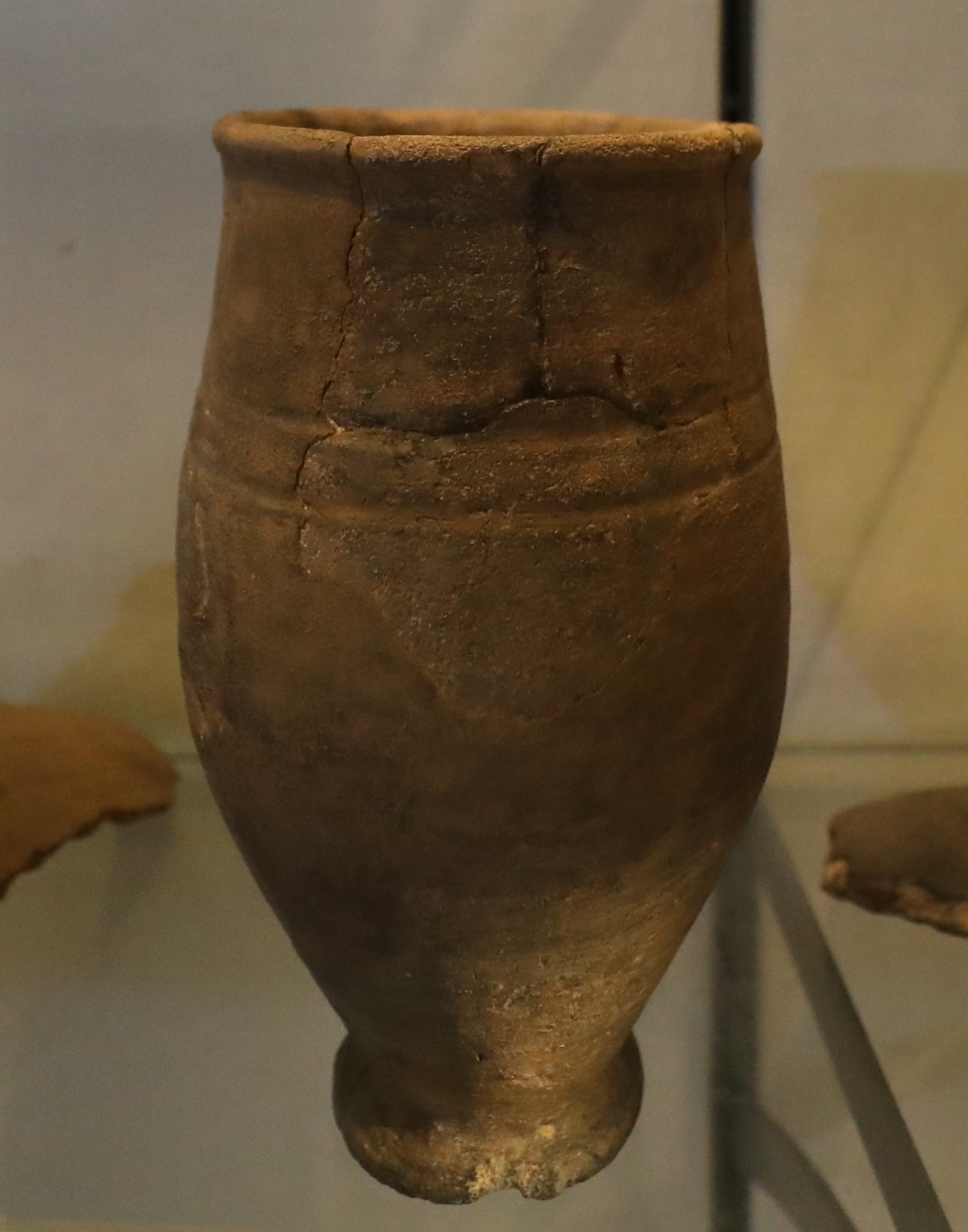
Vectis ware pot

Vectis ware is the pottery produced on the Isle of Wight during the Roman period.

Vectis ware is a hard, hand made pottery and most commonly very dark grey in colour due to Burnishing. Three variants have been described. By far the most common is the very dark grey variant the other two are a lighter grey variant and an oxidised variant.

Production appears to have started prior to the Roman occupation and continued through most of it. It doesn't appear to have been based at a single location but instead at a number of kiln sites along the north of the island. The style was heavily influenced by Black-burnished ware with limited influence from North Gaulish styles.

It was the most common form of pottery found at Brading Roman Villa. It has also been found used as grave goods.

== See also ==
- List of Romano-British pottery
- Roman Britain
