= Nene Valley Colour Coated Ware =

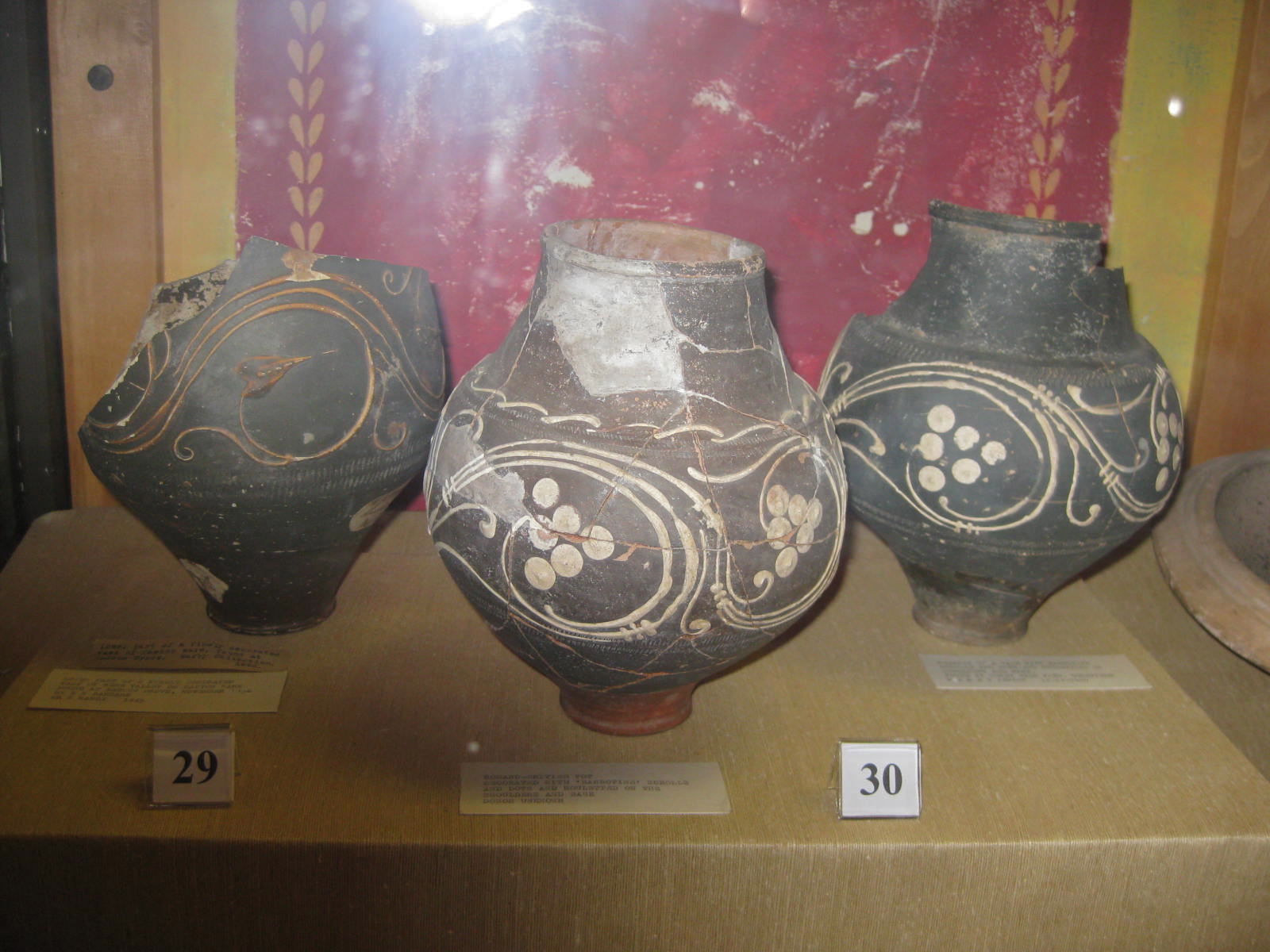
Decorated Nene Valley Roman Pottery, Wisbech Museum

Nene Valley Colour Coated Ware (or Castor Ware) is a type of Romano-British ceramic produced in the lower Nene Valley centred on Durobrivae (Water Newton) from the mid-2nd to 4th centuries AD. The closest city is Peterborough, which vies with Northampton, Wisbech and London museums as a main repository and exhibition location of finds, arguably the most impressive of which are at the British Museum. The name of this type of ceramic is often abbreviated to NVCC.

== Industry ==
Pottery manufacture locally started in the mid first century AD, with workshops associated with the Roman fort at Longthorpe, Peterborough with an expansion for several miles along the Nene valley between Wansford and Peterborough in the second century. The production centre was at the Roman town at Durobrivae (Water Newton) although the NVCC products are associated with a number of kilns found throughout the area at Stibbington, Sibson-cum-Stibbington, Chesterton, Yaxley, and Stanground.

== Fabric ==
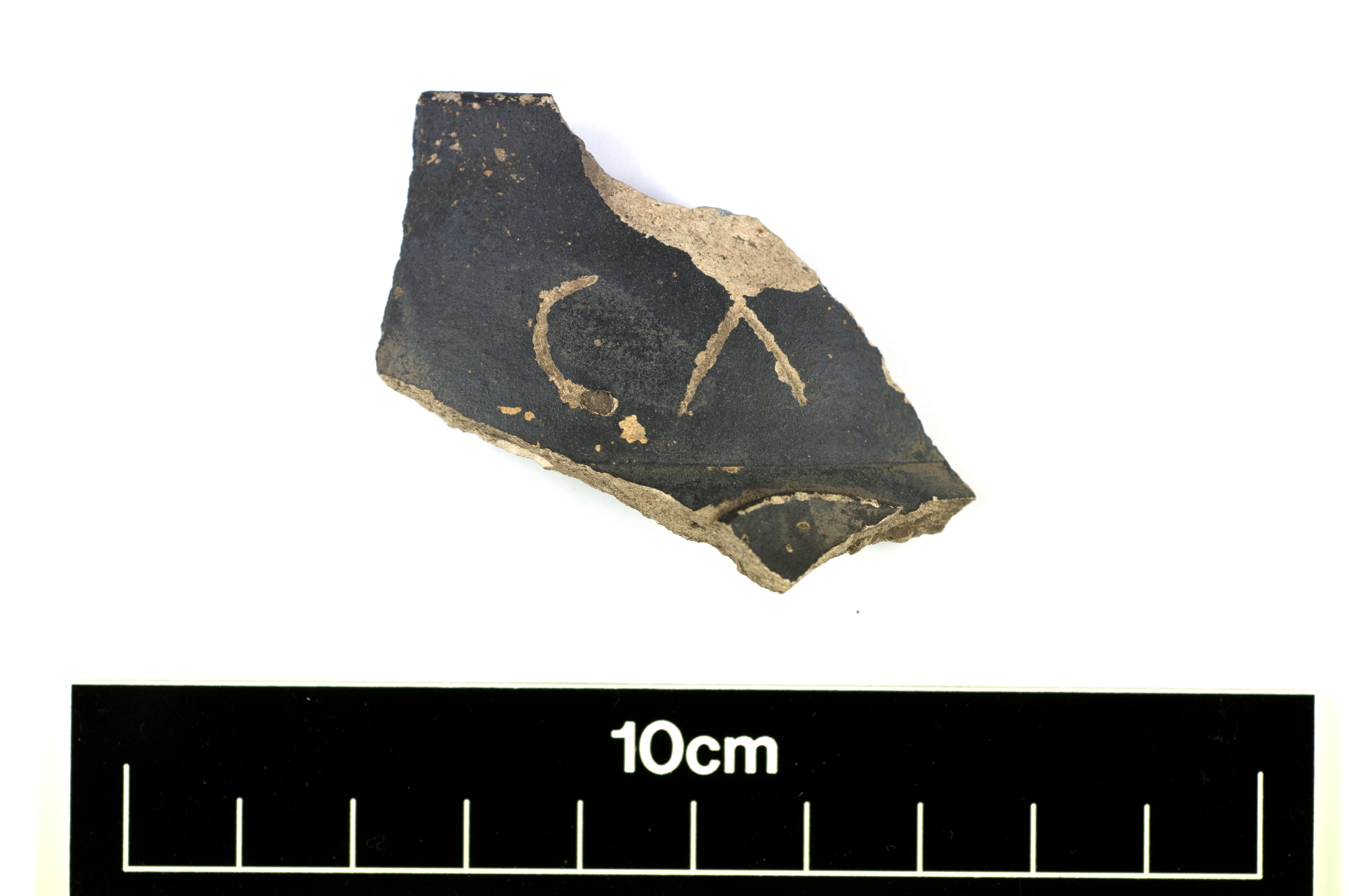
Nene Valley Colour Coated Ware graffito sherd showing fabric colour and inclusions.

The NVCC ceramic is a hard, smooth-textured fabric with finely irregular fracture. It is usually coloured white to off-white. The slip has a variable colour, dark brown to black, mottled lighter orange or orange-brown where thinner. The temper includes an abundant amount of very fine quartz sand and occasional larger quartz grains, red or orange and black flecks and occasional pale clay pellets.

== Decoration ==
The decoration of NVCC vessels is quite distinctive. The most common forms are beakers; both cornice-rimmed and bag-beakers. Where decoration occurs it includes barbotine (both under and over the slip), rouletting and grooving. Hunt scenes in barbotine decoration are well known from the earlier part of the industry, with the use of whorls instead of these beginning in the 3rd century AD.

== Institutions ==
The following institutions are listed as having considerable collections of NVCC Ware collections:

- British Museum
- Peterborough Museum

== See also ==
- Nene Valley (disambiguation)
- List of Romano-British pottery
