= Newport Arch =

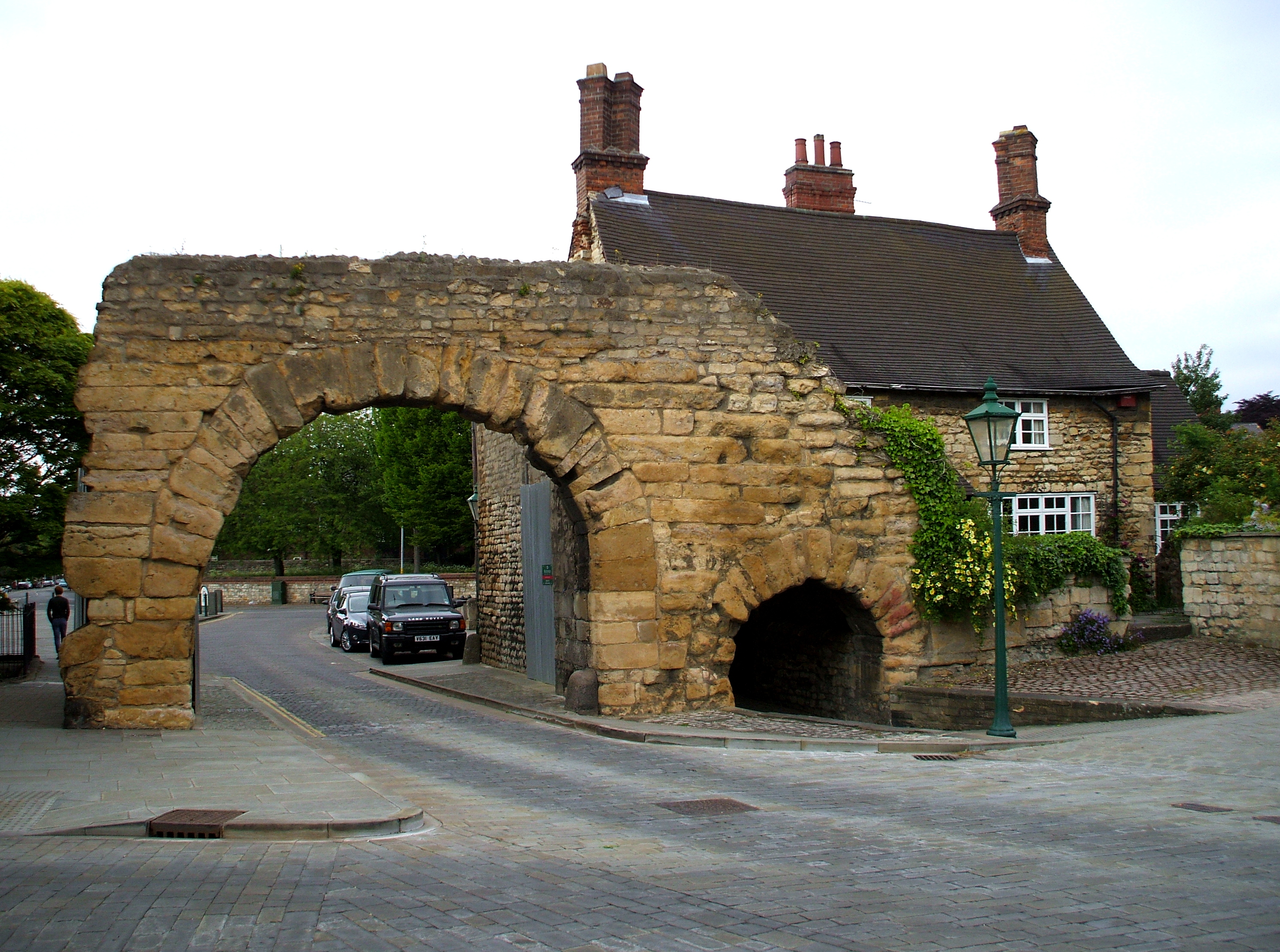
- Newport Arch from the south

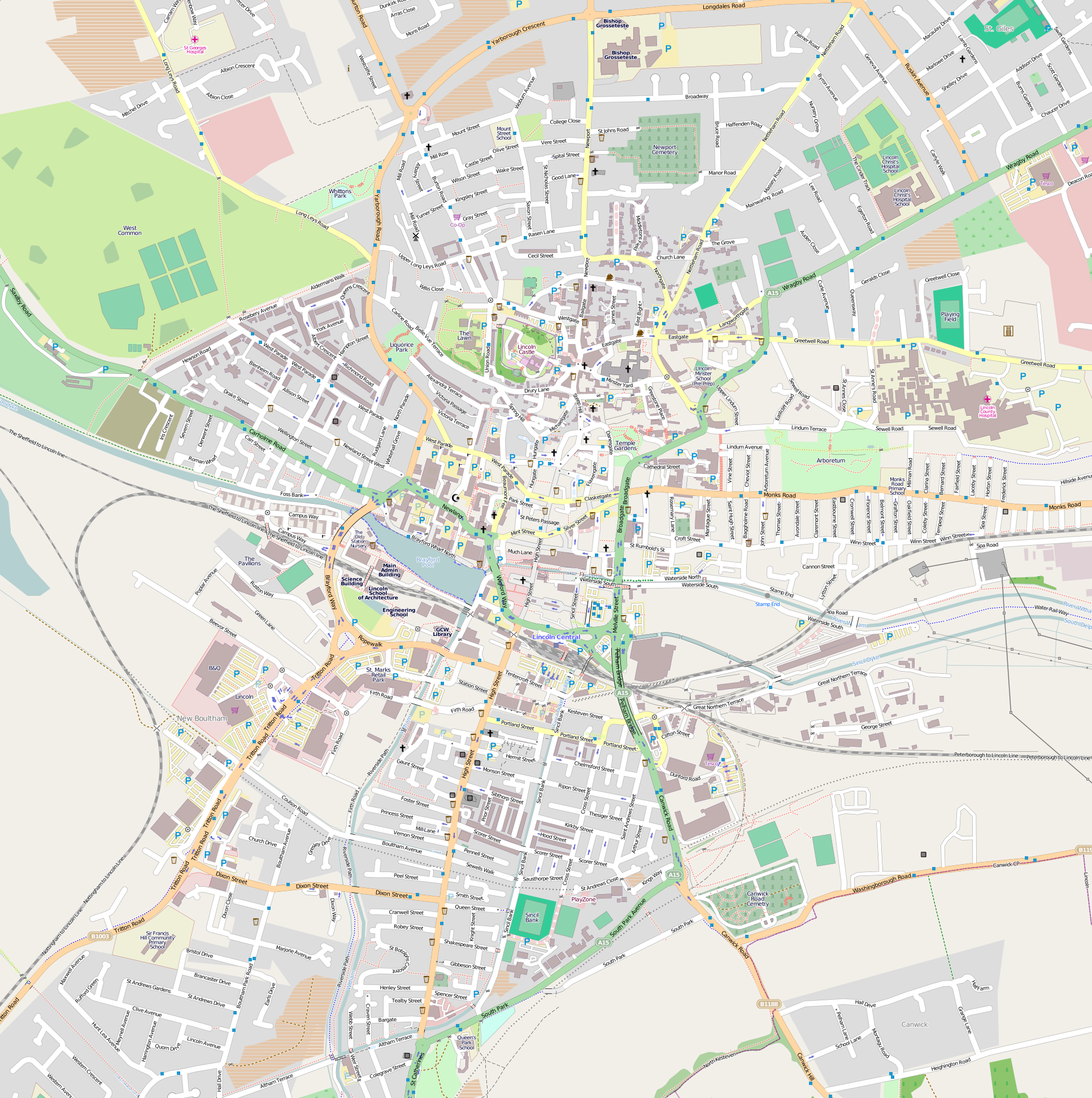
- Location within Lincoln city centre Location within Lincolnshire

General information
- Type: Gateway to Roman Fort
- Location: Lincoln, England
- Coordinates: 53°14′13.93″N 0°32′17.41″W
- Estimated completion: 3rd century

Scheduled monument
- Reference no.: 1005478

Listed Building – Grade I
- Designated: 8 October 1953
- Reference no.: 1388450

Newport Arch is a 3rd-century Roman gate in the Newport district of the city of Lincoln in Lincolnshire, England. It is a Scheduled monument and Grade I listed building and is reputedly the oldest arch in the United Kingdom still used by traffic.

== History ==
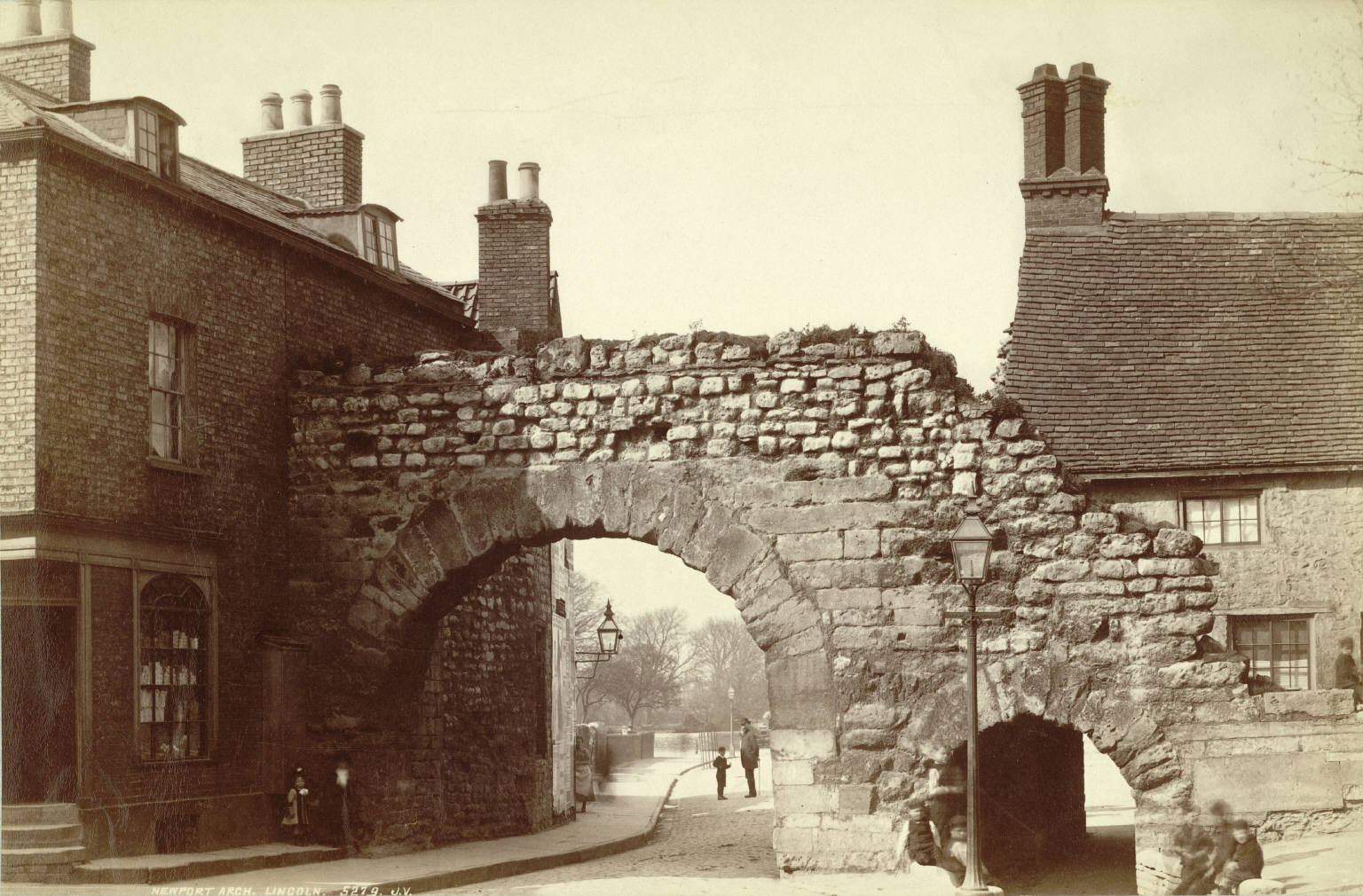
Newport Arch in the second half of the 19th century. A brick building touched the west side of the arch. It was later razed and replaced with one standing further away, allowing for a pavement

The arch was remodelled and enlarged when the city, then the Roman town Lindum Colonia, became capital of the province Flavia Caesariensis in the 4th century. Though unique in the United Kingdom, it is nevertheless one of many original Roman arches still open to traffic, other examples being two gates through the city walls of the Roman town of Diocletianopolis (now Hisarya, Bulgaria), as well as numerous examples in Anatolia.

As the north gate of the city, it carried the major Roman road Ermine Street northward almost in a straight line to the Humber.

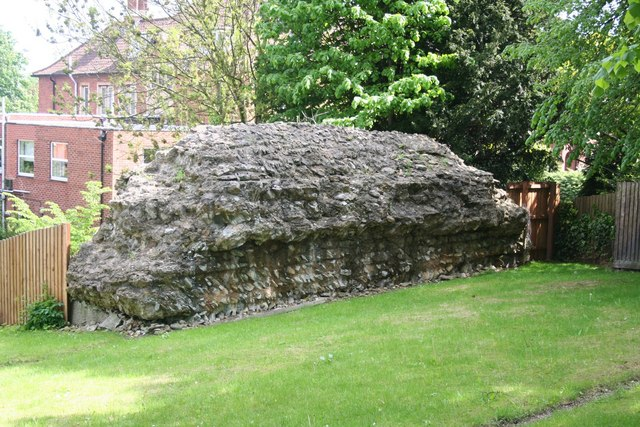
A surviving section of the Roman city wall to the east of the Arch

From Romano-British Buildings and Earthworks by John Ward (1911):

A considerable portion of the north gate of Lincoln — the Newport Arch — is standing, but is buried to the extent of about 8 ft (2.4 m). in the soil and débris accumulated since Roman times. The structure is about 34 ft (10 m) deep and has a single passage for the road, 17 1/2 ft (5.3 m) wide. The inner or back portal of this passage is still intact, and is nearly 16 ft (4.9 m) in the clear and rises to a height of about 22 1/2 ft (6.9 m) above the Roman level. Its arch is of a single ring of large limestone voussoirs rising from imposts which appear to have been moulded. The outer or front arch has long since disappeared. On the east side is a postern for pedestrians, 7 ft (2.1 m). wide and contracting to about 5 ft (1.5 m). at the north end, and 15 ft (4.6 m). high from the Roman level. On the west side there was a similar postern about a century ago. The whole structure is of good masonry, and it appears to have projected considerably beyond the north face of the town wall.

== Accidents ==
In May 1964 a goods lorry belonging to the Humber Warehousing Company struck the arch while attempting to pass under it.

Forty years later, in May 2004, another lorry struck the arch, causing minor damage.

13 years later, in May 2017, a RASE logistics lorry got stuck underneath the arch; after letting down the tyres, it was able to reverse out with no apparent damage to the structure.

== See also ==
- Jewry Wall
