= Newport, Lincoln =

Area of Lincoln in Lincolnshire England

Coordinates: 53.241049°N 0.538115°W

Newport
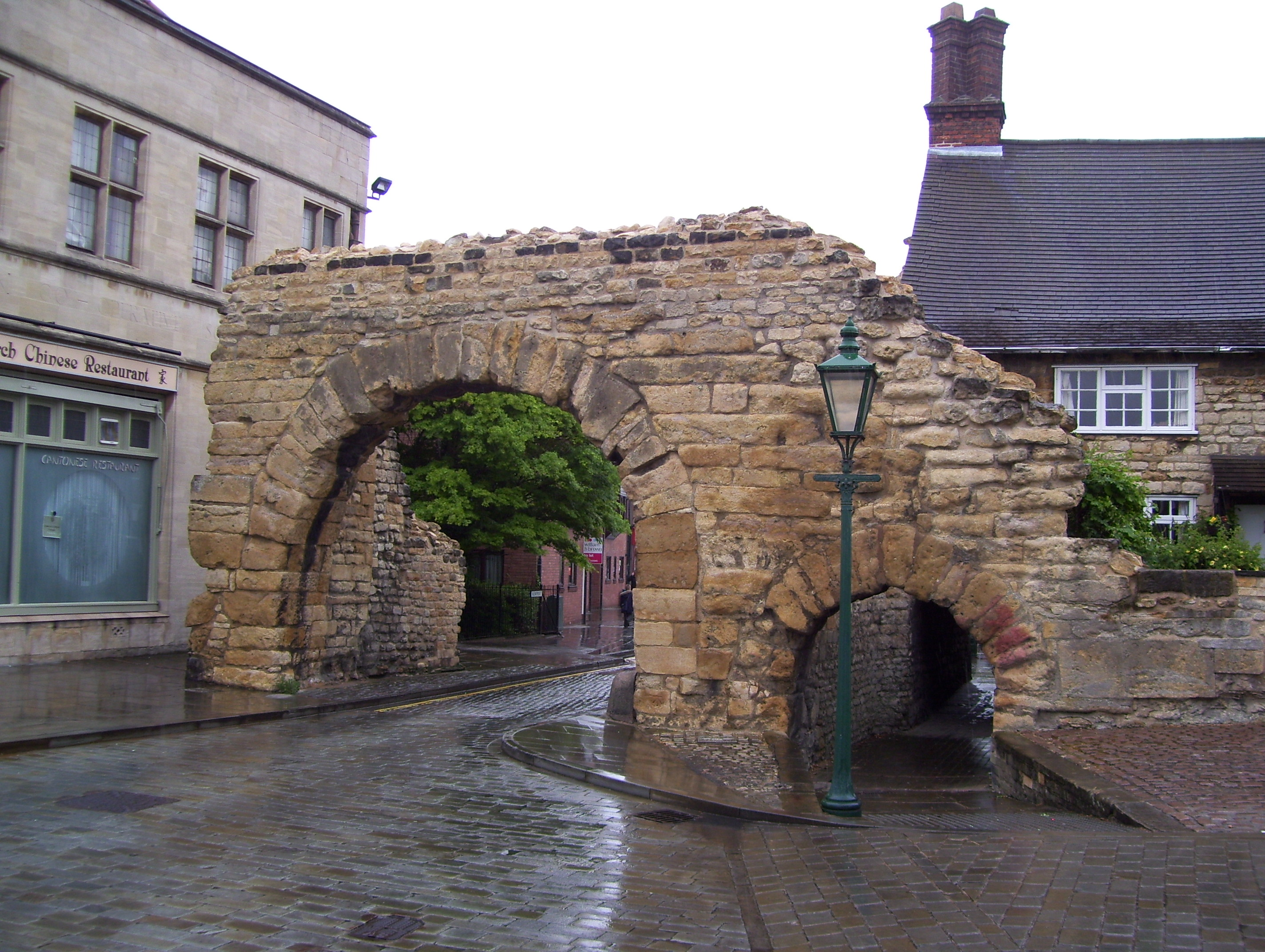
- Newport Arch, Lincoln

- Location within Lincolnshire
- Population: 353
  - London: 157 mi (253 km) S
- Civil parish: Unparished
- District: Lincoln
- Shire county: Lincolnshire
- Region: East Midlands
- Country: England
- Sovereign state: United Kingdom
- Post town: Lincoln
- Postcode district: LN1
- Dialling code: 01522
- Police: Lincolnshire
- Fire: Lincolnshire
- Ambulance: East Midlands
- UK Parliament: Lincoln

Newport is an inner-city suburb and historic district of Lincoln in the county of Lincolnshire, England. It is located to the north of the city centre and is close to the Bishop Grosseteste University, Lincoln Castle and Lincoln Cathedral as well as Newport Arch. It is one of the original districts and streets of the city itself. It dates back to around 1269 following the arrival of the Augustinians who built a priory in the area between Newport and Rasen Lane.

In about 1839, George Gilbert Scott and partner William Bonython Moffatt designed the church of St Nicholas in Newport. The church is a Grade II listed building.
