= Black-burnished ware =

Type of pottery

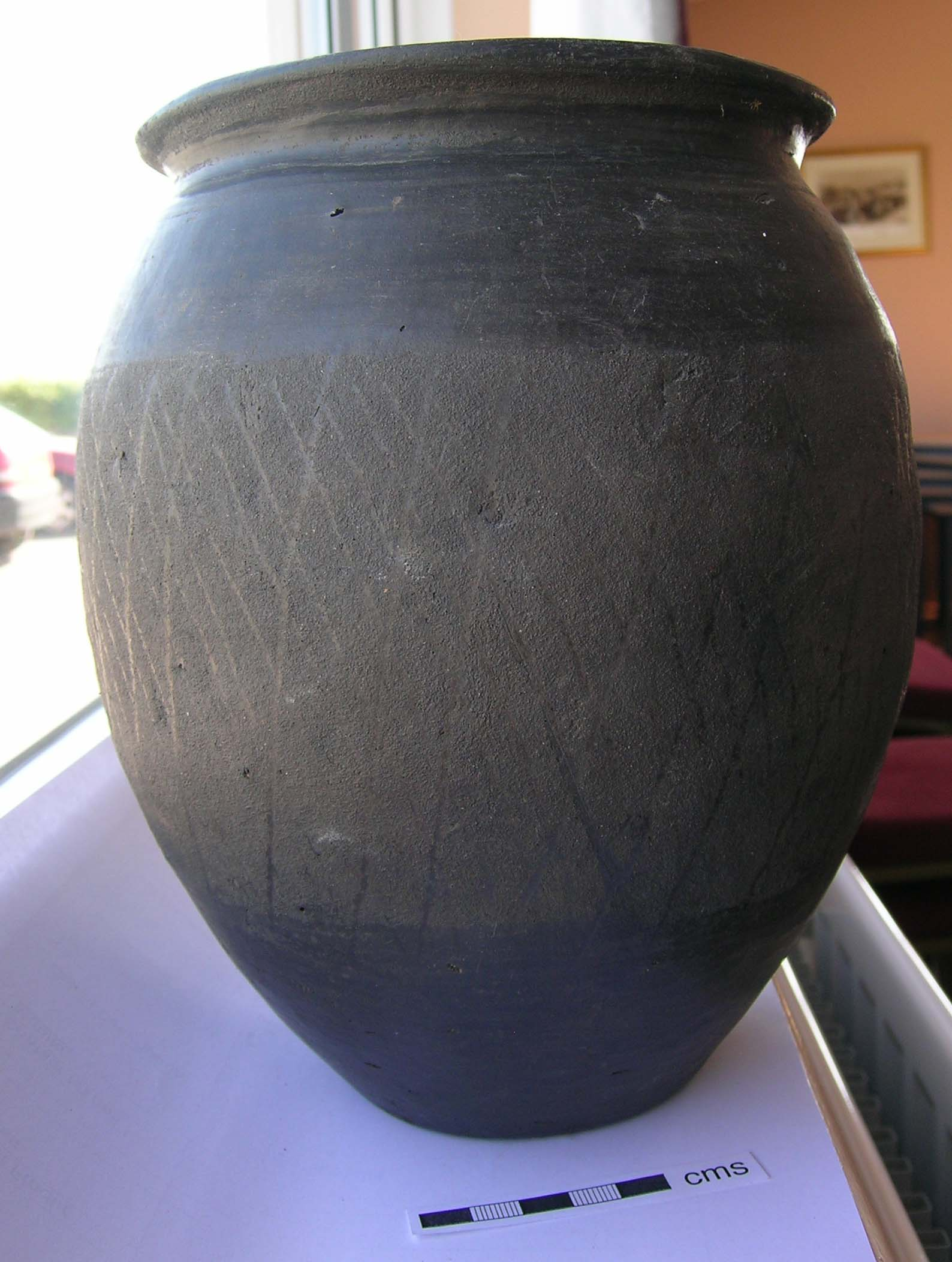
A Black-Burnished Ware broad-necked jar

Black-burnished ware is a type of Romano-British ceramic. Burnishing is a pottery treatment in which the surface of the pot is polished, using a hard smooth surface, such as a pebble. The classification includes two entirely different pottery types which share many stylistic characteristics. Black burnished ware 1 (BB1), is a black, coarse and gritty fabric. Vessels are hand made. Black burnished ware 2 (BB2) is a finer, black or grey-coloured, wheel thrown fabric.

Decoration on both types includes burnished lattice or, additionally, in the case of bowls and dishes, a wavy ("sine wave") line design. Standard forms across both types include jars with everted rims and bowls with upright or flat flanged rims.

== Black Burnished Ware 1 ==
Black Burnished Ware Category 1 (BB1) is made from a clay body that has a coarse texture. The clay body can contain black iron ores, flint, quartz, red iron ores, shale fragments, and white mica. BB1 can be grainy and black or dark gray in appearance. These wares are formed by hand.

BB1 wares were manufactured in the Dorset area and distributed throughout Britain. The distribution of BB1 wares dates primarily to the mid-second to fourth centuries AD. Forms include bowls, dishes, and jars.

Early BB1 influenced Vectis ware.

== Black Burnished Ware 2 ==
Black Burnished Ware Category 2 (BB2) is greyer in color and has a finer texture when compared with BB1. It is a "hard, sandy fabric, varying in colour from dark-grey or black with a brown or reddish brown core and a reddish-brown, blue-grey, black or lighter ('pearly grey') surface." The clay body can contain black iron ore, mica, and quartz, all in a matrix of sediment. These wares are thrown on a fast potter's wheel.

BB2 wares were manufactured on both the Essex and Kent sides of the Thames Estuary. The distribution of BB2 wares occurred from AD 140 through to the mid third century AD in south-east England and the northern part of Britain.
