= Dales ware =

Ancient pottery style

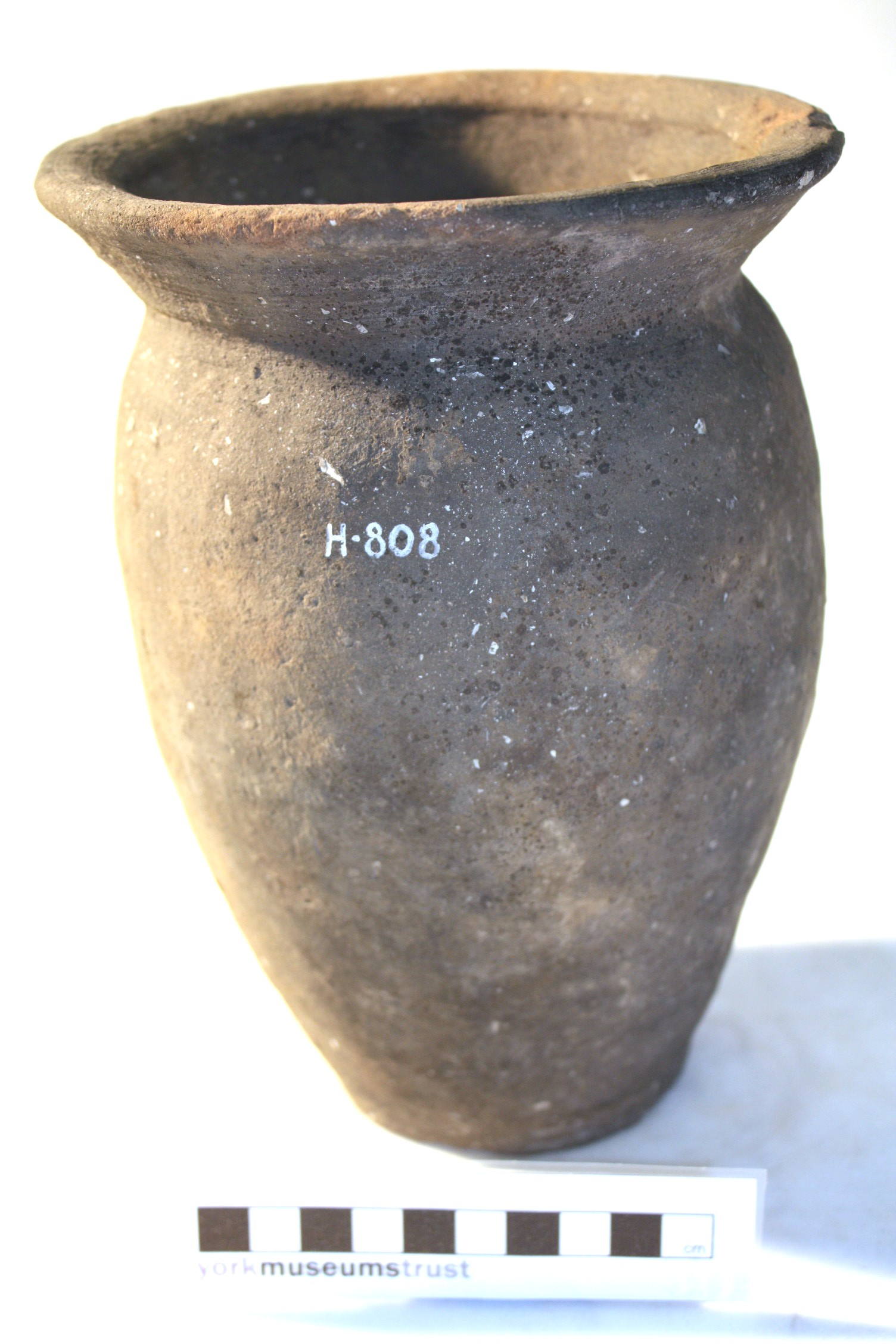
Dales-type ware Jar showing characteristic projecting rim

Dales ware is a type of pottery produced in the South Yorkshire and Lincolnshire areas of England and widely distributed across northern Britain during the 3rd and 4th centuries AD.

== Industry ==
Dales ware was predominantly produced in north Lincolnshire, but had other production centres in Yorkshire, and was traded northwards, east of the Pennines in the 3rd and 4th Centuries AD. It most commonly occurs as jars.

== Fabric ==
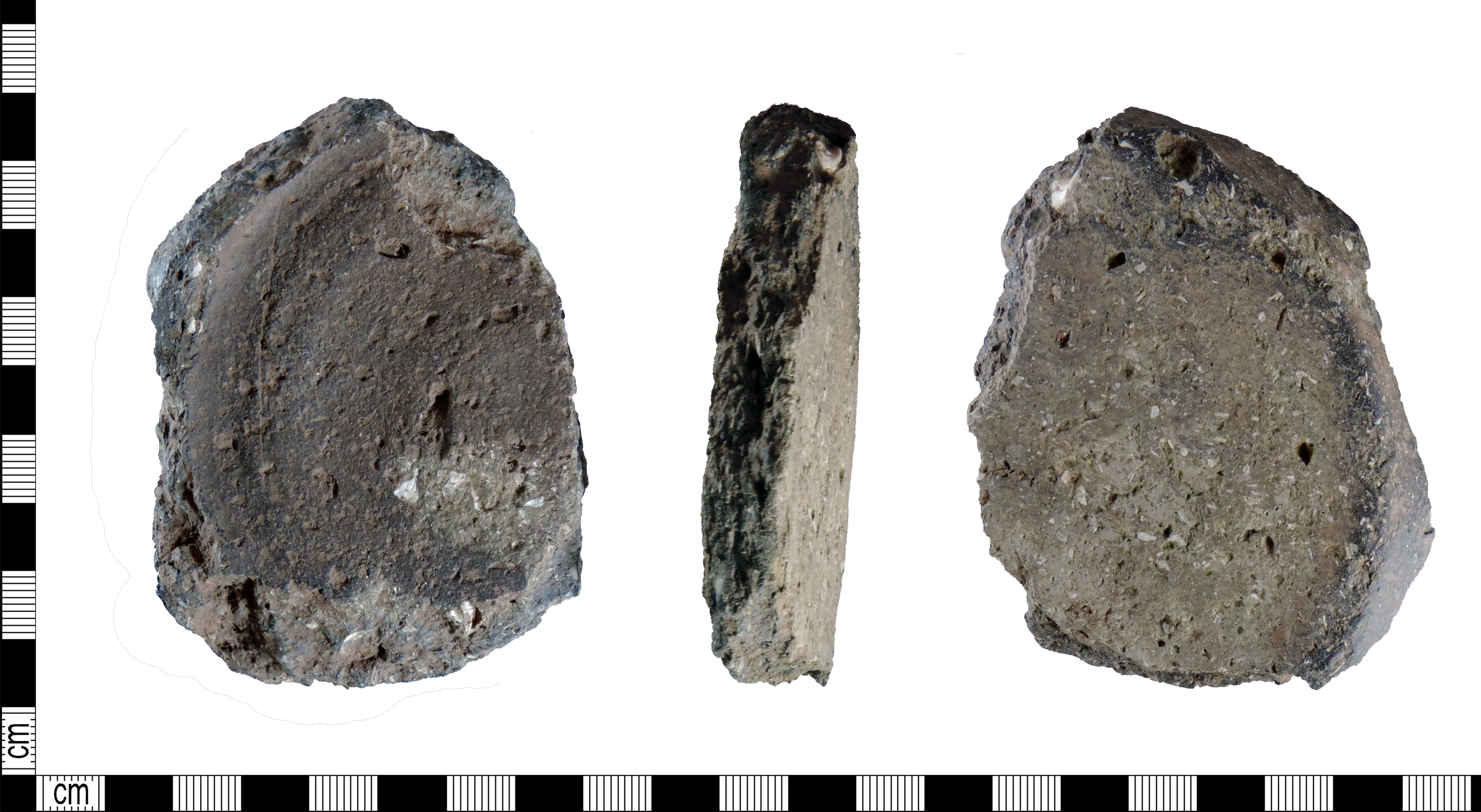
A base sherd from a Dales-type ware vessel

=== Dales Ware ===
Dales ware is a handmade, shell-tempered coarseware ceramic with a distinctive rim, often wheel-formed. The fabric is rough and coloured brown-grey. It often includes irregular finger indentations around the lower body, but is generally smoothed towards the shoulder and over the rim and lip.

=== Dales-type ware ===
The Dales-type ware was defined by Loughlin. The fabric differs in being hard-fired and grey, in comparison to the above. Dales-type jars are always more numerous than true Dales ware and were popular as burial urns in Roman York.

== See also ==
- Eboracum
- Crambeck Ware
- Ancient Roman Pottery
- List of Romano-British pottery
