= Nene Valley, South Australia =

Nene Valley South Australia
- Coordinates: 37°59′27″S 140°31′08″E
- Population: 99 (SAL 2021)
- Established: 31 October 1996
- Postcode(s): 5291
- Time zone: ACST (UTC+9:30)
  - Summer (DST): ACST (UTC+10:30)
- Location: 377 km (234 mi) SE of Adelaide; 23 km (14 mi) SW of Mount Gambier
- LGA(s): District Council of Grant
- Region: Limestone Coast
- County: Grey
- State electorate(s): Mount Gambier
- Federal division(s): Barker
Mean max temp	Mean min temp	Annual rainfall
19.0 °C; 66 °F	8.2 °C; 47 °F	712.4 mm 28 in
Suburbs around Nene Valley:
Kongorong	Kongorong	Kongorong
Blackfellows Caves	Nene Valley	Cape Douglas
Ocean	Ocean	Ocean
- Footnotes: Locations; Adjoining localities

Nene Valley is a locality in the Australian state of South Australia located on the state’s south-east coast overlooking the body of water known in Australia as the Southern Ocean and by international authorities as the Great Australian Bight about 377 kilometres (234 mi) south east of the state capital of Adelaide and about 23 kilometres (14 mi) south-west of the municipal seat of Mount Gambier.

Boundaries for the locality were created on 31 October 1996 for “the long established name” and includes the site of the Nene Valley Shack Site. The name is derived from a geographical feature within the locality called Nene Valley which is itself named after Nene Valley, a ship which was wrecked off the coastline of what is now the locality on 19 October 1854.

The locality overlooks a coastline which faces the south-west. Land along the coast consists of a coastal dune which is occupied in its north-west by a protected area called the Nene Valley Conservation Park, and in its south-east by a settlement and then by land zoned as ‘coastal conservation’. The settlement which was originally the Nene Valley Shack Site, consists of single storey dwellings. The settlement is connected to the local road network by the Nene Valley Shacks Road. Land in the remainder of the locality is zoned for ‘primary production’ purposes such as agriculture.

Nene Valley is located within the federal division of Barker, the state electoral district of Mount Gambier and the local government area of the District Council of Grant.
