= Nene Valley Conservation Park =

Protected area in South Australia

- IUCN category III (natural monument or feature)
- Location within South Australia
- Location: South Australia
- Nearest city: Port MacDonnell.
- Coordinates: 37°58′34″S 140°30′49″E
- Area: 3.92 km^{2} (1.51 sq mi)
- Established: 14 December 1972
- Governing body: Department for Environment and Water

Nene Valley Conservation Park is a protected area in the Australian state of South Australia located in the localities of Blackfellows Caves and Nene Valley in the state's south-east about 35 kilometres (22 miles) south west of the municipal seat of Mount Gambier and about 18 kilometres (11 miles) west north west of Port MacDonnell.

The conservation park was proclaimed under the National Parks and Wildlife Act 1972 on 14 December 1972. In 1980, the following state of significance was published:

Nene Valley Conservation Park preserves an area of vegetation typical of sandy coasts in the south-east of South Australia. This vegetation complex has suffered through the effects of clearing and grazing throughout much of its former range.

The conservation park is classified as an IUCN Category III protected area.
