= Huntcliff ware =

Type of Romano-British ceramic

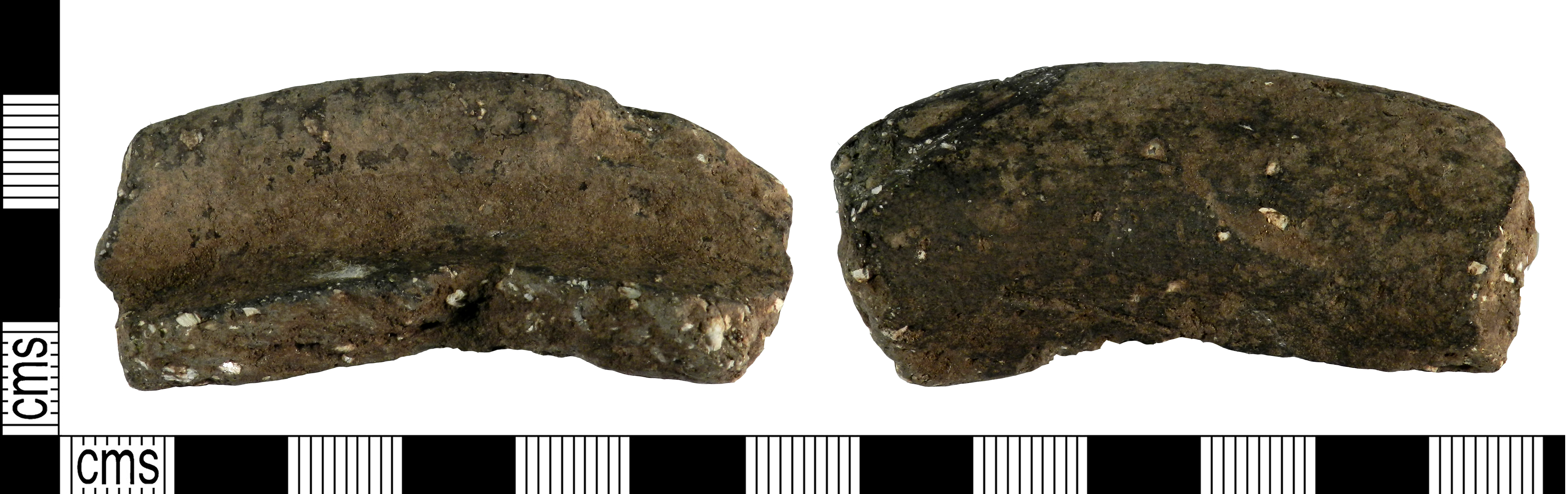
A rim sherd from a Huntcliff Calcite-gritted ware vessel

Huntcliff ware or more correctly 'Huntcliff-type', is a type of Romano-British ceramic.

Use of the term 'Huntcliff ware' is contentious because it suggests the pottery was manufactured at the Roman signal station on the east coast of Yorkshire. No kilns have been found for the calcite-gritted ware industry but an East Yorkshire source is suspected on distribution patterns, possibly in the Vale of Pickering.The term Huntcliff-type refers to the report in which this jar was first recognised as a type.

== Industry ==
It is a distinctive variety of calcite-gritted ware jar with a curved, everted rim with lid-seated groove, made in East Yorkshire from around AD 360 to the 5th century AD.

== Fabric ==
This fabric may be dark grey, dark brown or more usually black. It is hard with a hackly fracture and harsh feel. The external surfaces are usually smoothed and knife trimmed near the base. A series of poorly executed parallel grooves on the shoulder are characteristic. It is heavily tempered with crushed calcite. The jar forms have handmade bodies and the rim finished on a potter's wheel.
