= Mortarium =

Ancient Roman kitchen vessels

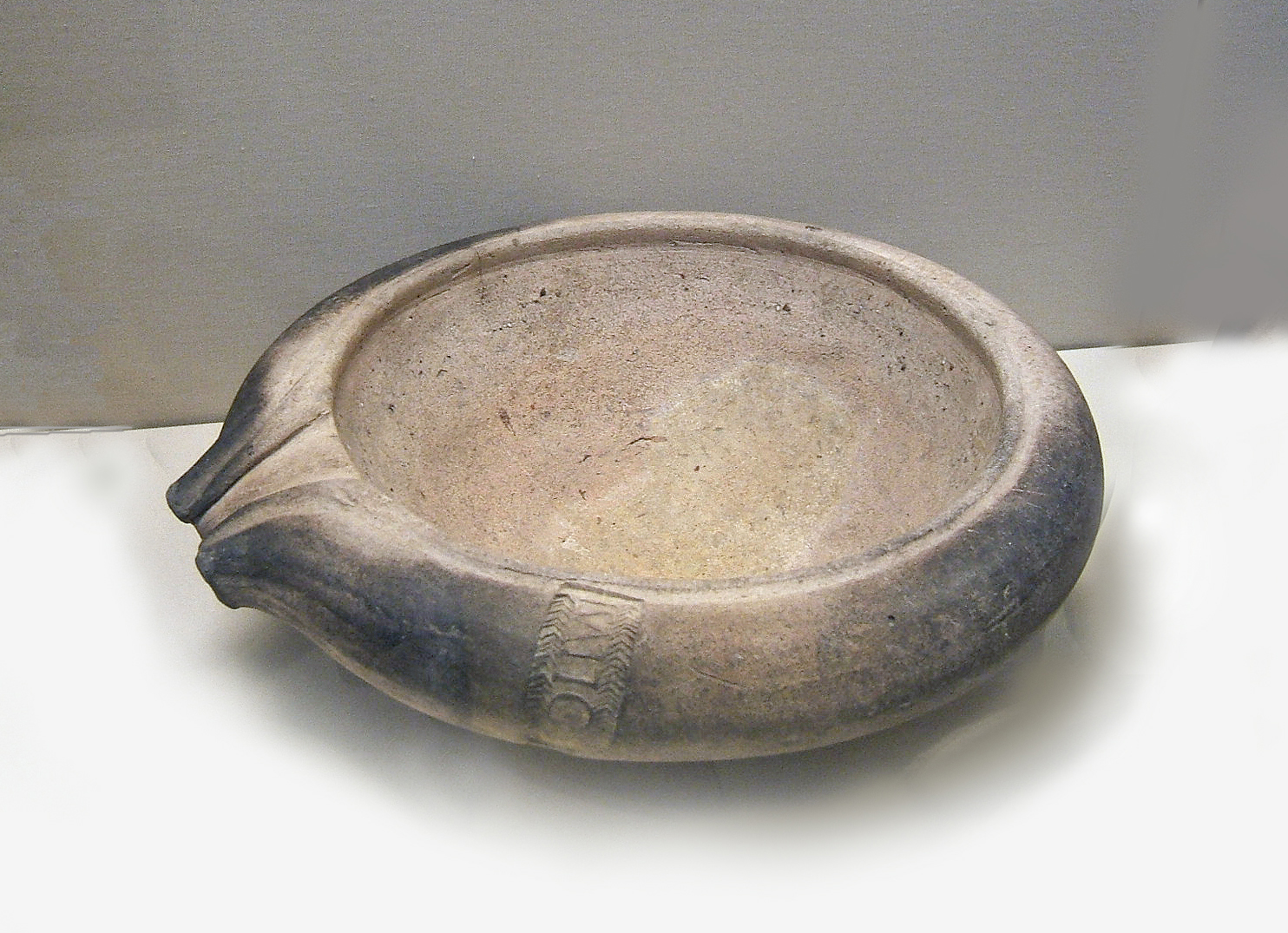
Mortarium with simple pouring spout, made in the vicinity of Verulamium in Britain, 1st century AD.

A mortarium (pl. "mortaria") was one of a class of Ancient Roman pottery kitchen vessels, specifically a type of mortar. They are bowls with thick sides that were likely used for crushing and grinding foodstuffs. They sometimes had grit embedded in the inner surface and a spout. Less commonly, some mortaria also had handles. They were used for pounding or mixing foods. Stamps on some early Roman mortaria record the name of the potter, from which it is possible to trace their movement between workshops. Some vessels produced in Italy and Gaul are transported long distances but local factories dominate at most periods.

Mortaria are an important indicator of the spread of Romanized food preparation methods; rather than an adoption of Roman food practices and foodways, the growing use of mortaria may also reflect adaptation of existing food preparation techniques to new material cultures. Many fancy red mortaria had a small hole near the top to allow the discharge of liquids, which was artistically made to appear as the mouth of a lion, mouse, or bat.

== Etymology ==
The English word mortar derives from classical Latin mortarium, possibly with some influence from the French mortier. The Latin term means, among several other usages, "receptacle for pounding" and "product of grinding or pounding".

== Bibliography ==
- "mortar (n.1)". Oxford English Dictionary. Oxford University Press. 2024. doi:10.1093/OED/7771393343.
- Cramp, Lucy J. E.; Evershed, Richard P.; Eckardt, Hella (2011). "What was a mortarium used for? Organic residues and cultural change in Iron Age and Roman Britain". Antiquity. 85 (330): 1339–1352. doi:10.1017/S0003598X00062098. hdl:1983/54a080d7-7b22-408e-b805-dc8ab2e12887.
- Symonds, Robin P. (2012). "A brief history of the ceramic mortarium in antiquity". Journal of Roman Pottery Studies. 15: 169–214.
