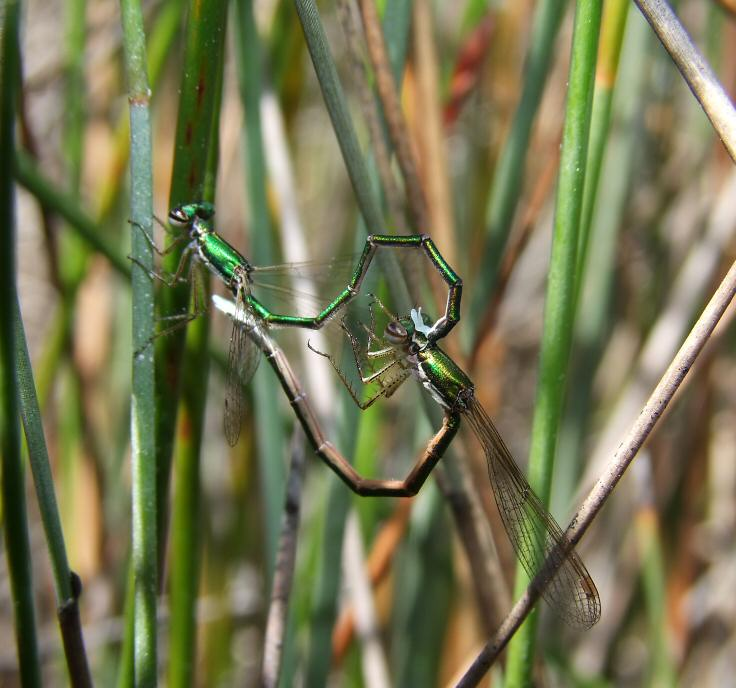
- mating pair

Conservation status
- Least Concern (IUCN 3.1)

Scientific classification
- Kingdom: Animalia
- Phylum: Arthropoda
- Clade: Pancrustacea
- Class: Insecta
- Order: Odonata
- Suborder: Zygoptera
- Family: Hemiphlebiidae; Kennedy, 1920
- Genus: Hemiphlebia; Selys, 1868
- Species: H. mirabilis

Binomial name
- Hemiphlebia mirabilis Selys, 1868

= Hemiphlebia =

Ancient greenling

Species of damselfly

Hemiphlebia is a genus of damselfly containing a single living species, Hemiphlebia mirabilis, commonly known as the ancient greenling. It is the only living genus in the family Hemiphlebiidae.

It is very small with a long, metallic-green body and clear wings. It is endemic to south-eastern Australia. Its natural swamp habitat is threatened by habitat loss. The oldest representatives of the family date to the Late Jurassic.

== Description ==
Hemiphlebia mirabilis is a very small damselfly with a slender metallic green, blue-green or bronze body and clear wings. The abdomen is longer than the short wings and males have conspicuous large white appendages, which are often held raised above the tip of the abdomen.

The species is distinguished by its unusual wing venation. The forewing has an open discoidal cell at its base, a feature noted by Selys in his original description and one that contributes to the species' distinctive appearance.

Adults are typically found resting among rushes and other wetland vegetation, where their slender form and coloration provide effective camouflage.

== Behaviour ==
The ancient greenling is an inconspicuous species that spends much of its time among dense wetland vegetation and appears to fly only short distances. When disturbed it may walk backwards down plant stems rather than take flight.

Males and females have both been observed raising and flicking the abdomen, exposing their pale terminal appendages. The function of this behaviour is uncertain, although it has been suggested that it may play a role in communication between individuals.

== Distribution and habitat ==
The ancient greenling has been recorded from a small number of scattered sites, including on King Island and in Mount William, Tasmania; in Wilsons Promontory National Park and near Yea, Victoria; and in Piccaninnie Ponds Conservation Park in south-eastern South Australia. Its recorded habitat includes permanent freshwater ponds, riverine lagoons and swamps that may dry out seasonally. A favoured site discovered in 2008, Long Swamp in the Discovery Bay Coastal Park of south-western Victoria, contains extensive areas of twig-rush (Baumea sp.) which is seasonally flooded but dries out by late summer.

== Conservation ==
The greenling's conservation status was raised from Vulnerable to Endangered in 2008 because of the limited area of habitat occupied, as well as the small and scattered character of the populations, at least some of which were in decline. However, it is now considered by IUCN to be of Least Concern, in part because it occurs in at least one protected area.

== Classification ==
Hemiphlebia mirabilis is the sole living species of the genus Hemiphlebia and the only extant member of the family Hemiphlebiidae. The genus and species were described by Selys in 1868, who noted that it differed markedly from all other living odonates known to him.

The distinctive morphology of Hemiphlebia led Clarence Hamilton Kennedy to place it in its own family, Hemiphlebiidae, in 1920. Later authors considered it sufficiently distinct to be placed in a separate superfamily, Hemiphlebioidea.

Modern phylogenetic studies place Hemiphlebiidae within the superfamily Lestoidea, where it is recovered as the sister group to all remaining living members of that superfamily.

== Etymology ==
The genus name Hemiphlebia is derived from the Greek ἡμι- (hēmi, "half") and φλέψ (phleps, "vein"), referring to the reduced venation of the forewing.

The species name mirabilis is Latin for "wonderful", "extraordinary", or "unusual", likewise referring to this reduced wing venation.

== Gallery ==
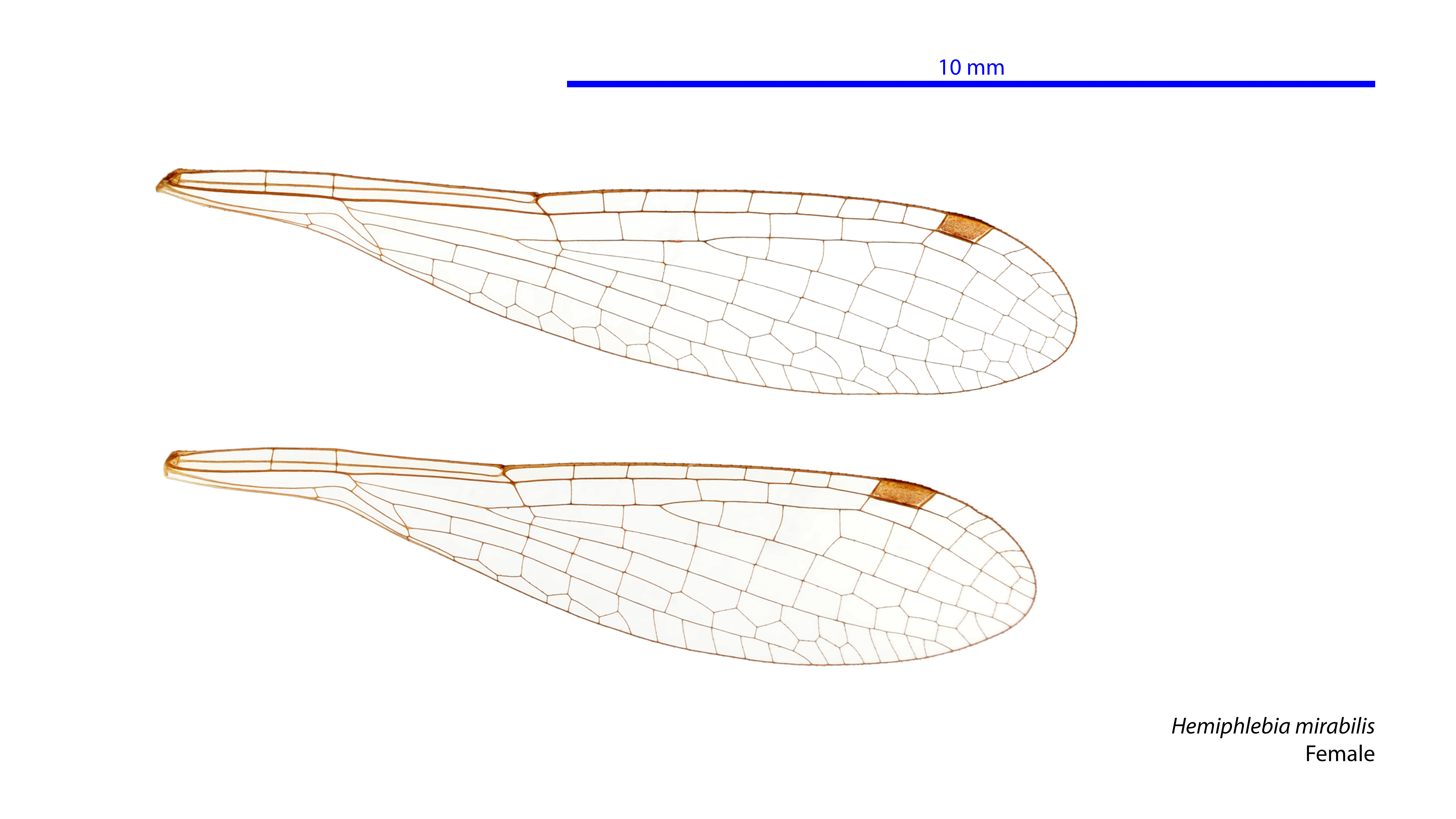
Female wings

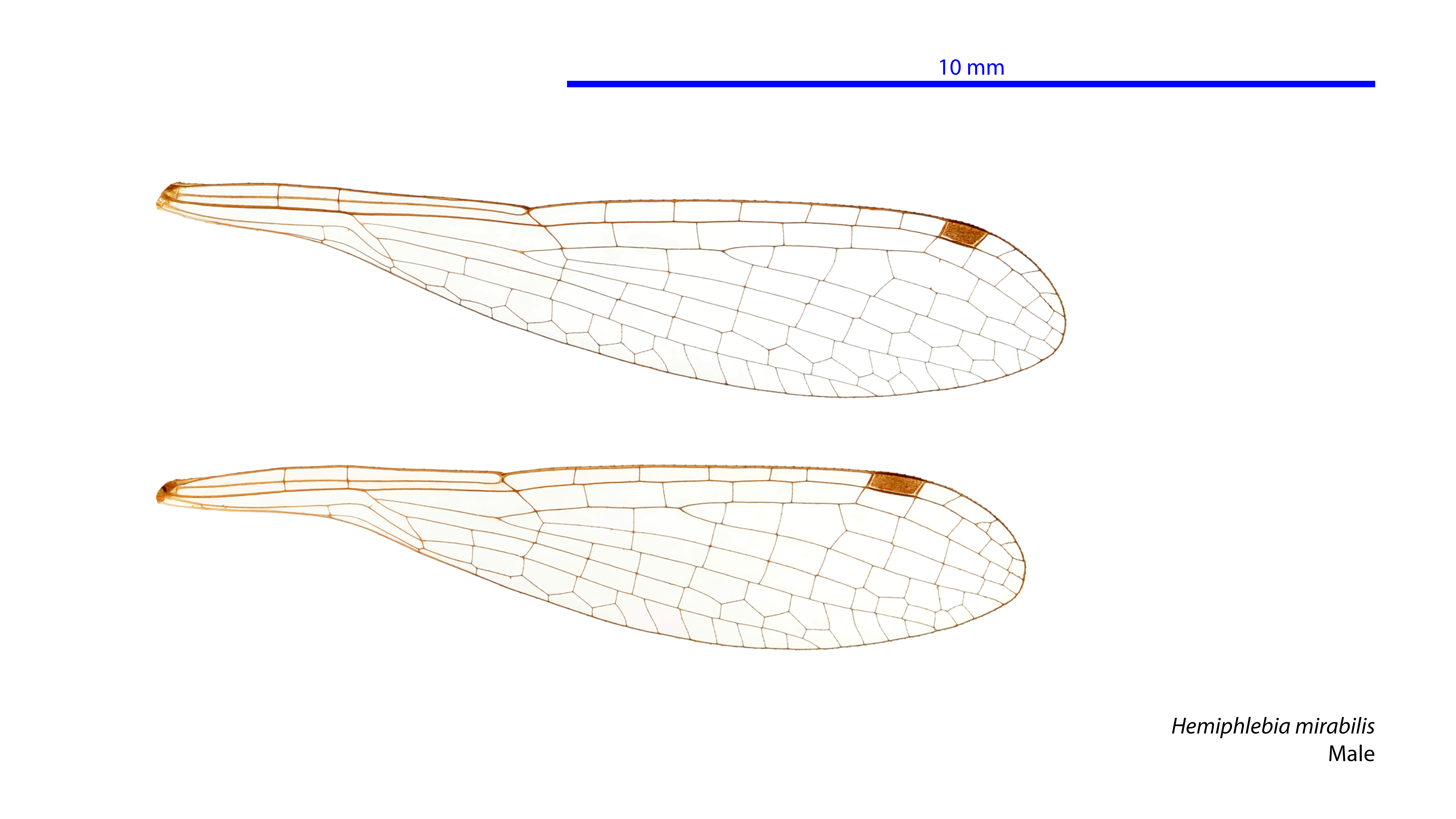
Male wings
