= Discovery Bay (disambiguation) =

Discovery Bay is a residential development in Hong Kong, on Lantau Island. Discovery Bay may also refer to:

== Australia ==
- Discovery Bay (Australia), a bay straddling the border between South Australia and Victoria in Australia
- Discovery Bay Coastal Park, a protected area in Victoria (Australia)
- Discovery Bay Marine National Park, a marine protected area in Victoria (Australia)

== United States ==
- Discovery Bay, California, community
- Discovery Bay (Washington), bay
- Discovery Bay, Washington, community

== Other ==
- Discovery Bay (Antarctica), a bay in the South Shetland Islands
- Discovery Bay, Jamaica, a town in Jamaica
- A planned (but never built) land at Disneyland

== See also ==
- Disco Bay
