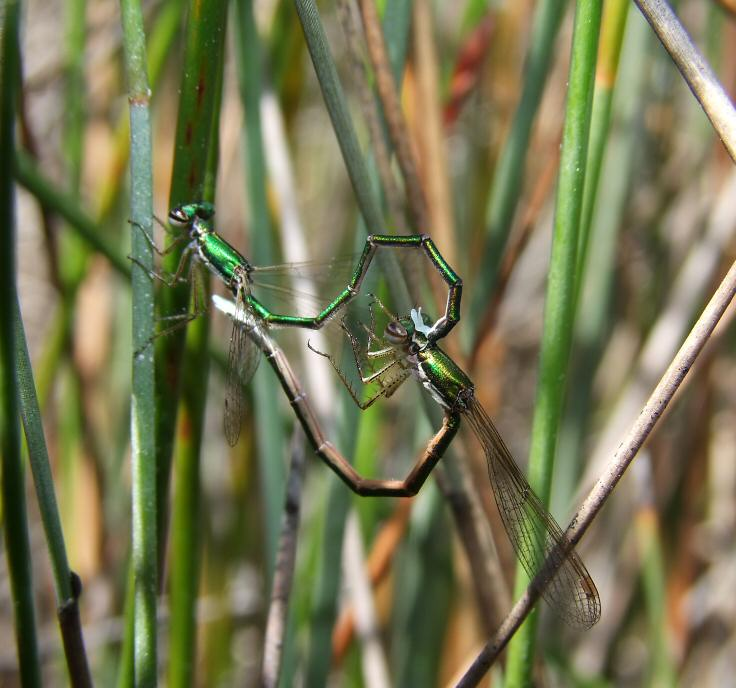
- Hemiphlebia mirabilis

Scientific classification
- Kingdom: Animalia
- Phylum: Arthropoda
- Clade: Pancrustacea
- Class: Insecta
- Order: Odonata
- Suborder: Zygoptera
- Superfamily: Lestoidea
- Family: Hemiphlebiidae; Kennedy, 1920

Species
- Hemiphlebia mirabilis
- Distribution of Hemiphlebiidae

= Hemiphlebiidae =

Hemiphlebiidae Temporal range: Late Jurassic–Present

Family of damselflies

Hemiphlebiidae is a family of damselflies. It contains only one living species, the ancient greenling (Hemiphlebia mirabilis), which is endemic to south-eastern Australia. The family also includes numerous extinct genera known from Jurassic and Cretaceous deposits in Europe, Asia, the Middle East and South America. The fossil record of the family extends to the Late Jurassic, making Hemiphlebiidae the oldest known crown-group lineage of damselflies.

== Classification and phylogeny ==
Hemiphlebia was described by Selys in 1868, who remarked that it differed from all other living odonates known to him and compared its unusual wing venation with that of fossil forms. In 1920, Clarence Hamilton Kennedy established the family Hemiphlebiidae for the genus, regarding it as an isolated and ancient lineage of damselflies.

In his reclassification of the Odonata, Fraser (1957) placed the family in a separate superfamily, Hemiphlebioidea, and suggested that it occupied a position near the base of the suborder Zygoptera. Later authors likewise recognised the distinctive nature of the family, although its precise relationships remained uncertain.

Modern phylogenetic studies place Hemiphlebiidae within the superfamily Lestoidea, where it is consistently recovered as the sister group to all remaining living members of that superfamily.

== Species ==
The family contains a single extant genus and species:

- Hemiphlebia Selys, 1868
  - Hemiphlebia mirabilis Selys, 1868 – ancient greenling, Australia

== Fossils ==
The family has a rich fossil record extending from the Late Jurassic to the Late Cretaceous, and was formerly much more widespread than its present distribution in Australia.

- †Burmahemiphlebia Zheng et al. 2017 Burmese amber, Myanmar, Late Cretaceous (Cenomanian) 99 Ma
- †Electrohemiphlebia Lak et al. 2009 Charentese Amber, France, Cretaceous (Albian-Cenomanian) 105-99 Ma
- †Enteropia Pritykina and Vassilenko 2014 Shar Teg, Mongolia, Late Jurassic (Tithonian) 145 Ma.
- †Jordanhemiphlebia Kaddumi 2009 Jordanian Amber, Jordan, Early Cretaceous (Albian) 112.6 to 99.7 Ma
- †Jurahemiphlebia Bechly, 2019 Solnhofen Limestone, Germany, Late Jurassic (Tithonian) 145 Ma.
- †Kachinhemiphlebia Zheng 2020 Burmese amber, Myanmar, Late Cretaceous (Cenomanian) 99 Ma
- †Mersituria Vasilenko 2005 Doronino Formation, Russia, Early Cretaceous (Barremian) 130 to 125 Ma.
- †Pantelusa Vassilenko 2014 Ora Formation, Israel, Late Cretaceous (Turonian) 94.3 - 89.3 Ma
- †Parahemiphlebia Jarzembowski et al. 1998 Durlston Formation, United Kingdom Early Cretaceous (Berriasian) 145-140 Ma Crato Formation, Brazil Early Cretaceous (Aptian) 122-112 Ma.
- †Thairia Felker and Vasilenko 2018 Doronino Formation, Russia, Early Cretaceous (Barremian) 130 to 125 Ma.

== Etymology ==
The family name Hemiphlebiidae is derived from the type genus Hemiphlebia, with the standard zoological suffix -idae used for animal families.

The genus name Hemiphlebia is derived from the Greek ἡμι- (hēmi, "half") and φλέψ (phleps, "vein"), referring to the reduced venation of the forewing.
