= Piccaninnie Ponds Conservation Park =

Protected area near Mount Gambier in South Australia

- IUCN category III (natural monument or feature)
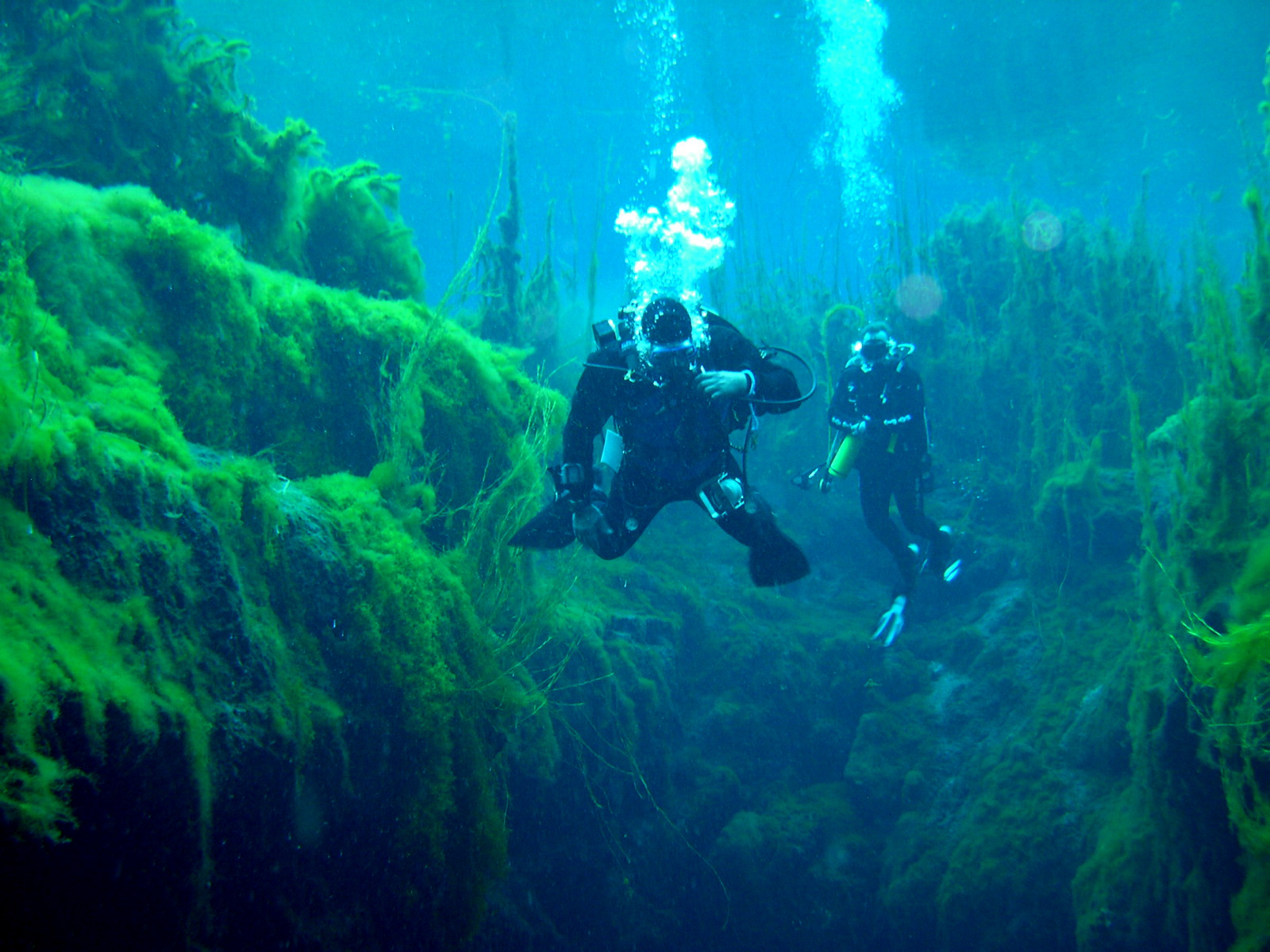
- Cave diving at Piccaninnie Ponds

- Location within South Australia
- Location: South Australia, Wye
- Nearest city: Donovans
- Coordinates: 38°03′03″S 140°56′11″E
- Area: 8.64 km^{2} (3.34 sq mi)
- Established: 16 October 1969
- Governing body: Department for Environment and Water
- Website: Official website

Ramsar Wetland
- Official name: Piccaninnie Ponds Karst Wetlands
- Designated: 21 December 2012
- Reference no.: 2136

Piccaninnie Ponds Conservation Park, formerly the Piccaninnie Ponds National Park, is a protected area of 862 hectares (2,130 acres) located in southeastern South Australia near Mount Gambier.

== Description ==
The Piccaninnie Ponds Conservation Park is located in the south-east of South Australia in the gazetted locality of Wye on the continental coastline overlooking Discovery Bay about 490 kilometres (300 mi) southeast of the state capital of Adelaide and 30 kilometres (19 mi) south-east of the city of Mount Gambier.

The conservation park conserves a wetland fed by freshwater springs in a karst landscape.

It is close to the border with Victoria and is part of the Discovery Bay to Piccaninnie Ponds Important Bird Area, identified by BirdLife International as being of global significance for several bird species. It is a listed Ramsar site. The park contains a walking track through coastal woodland to a viewing platform overlooking the wetlands.

== Recreational diving ==
Piccaninnie Ponds is a popular site for both snorkelling and cave diving. In 1964–1965, prior to its proclamation as a national park in 1969, underwater explorer Valerie Taylor described the ponds as "one of the most beautiful sights in Australia" and said that the crystal clear water gave her a feeling of unhindered flight. It contains three main features of interest to cave divers. The 'First Pond' is an open depression about 10 metres (33 ft) deep with a silt floor and vegetated fringe supporting much aquatic life. The 'Chasm' is a sinkhole with a depth of over 100 metres (330 ft), and the 'Cathedral' is an enclosed area with limestone formations and a depth of about 35 metres (115 ft). Underwater visibility is excellent and may exceed 40 metres (130 ft). Snorkelling and cave diving at Piccaninnie Ponds is by permit only.

=== Accidents ===
Several divers have died while exploring the caves beneath Piccaninnie Ponds, in 1972, 1974 and 1984.

== Flora and fauna ==
Piccaninnie Ponds contains a number of rare and endangered species of native plants and animals including fish, crustaceans and tortoises.

== See also ==
- Ewens Ponds – Flooded sinkholes in South Australia
- List of Ramsar sites in Australia
- List of sinkholes of Australia – Links to Wikipedia articles on sinkholes, blue holes, dolines, cenotes, and pit caves
- Protected areas of South Australia – Areas protected by legislation in South Australia
- Lower South East Marine Park – Protected area in South Australia
