= Wye, South Australia =

Wye
- Town
- Coordinates: 38°01′S 140°55′E
- Country: Australia
- State: South Australia
- Region: Limestone Coast
- LGA: District Council of Grant
- Location: 399 km (248 mi) SE of Adelaide; 22 km (14 mi) SE of Mount Gambier
- Established: 1869 (town); 31 October 1996 (locality)

Government
  - State electorate: Mount Gambier
  - Federal division: Barker

Population
  - Total: 95 (SAL 2021)
- Time zone: UTC+9:30 (ACST)
  - Summer (DST): UTC+10:30 (ACDT)
- Postcode: 5291
- County: Grey
- Mean max temp: 19.0 °C (66.2 °F)
- Mean min temp: 8.2 °C (46.8 °F)
- Annual rainfall: 708.4 mm (27.89 in)
Localities around Wye
Caveton	Caroline	Caroline
Eight Mile Creek	Wye	Donovans; Nelson
Ocean	Ocean	Ocean
- Locations; Adjoining localities

Wye is a locality in the Australian state of South Australia located on the state's south-east coast adjoining the border with the state of Victoria and overlooking Discovery Bay in the body of water known in Australia as the Southern Ocean and by international authorities as the Great Australian Bight. It is about 399 kilometres (248 miles) south-east of the state capital of Adelaide and 22 kilometres (14 miles) south-east of the city centre of Mount Gambier.

Wye is mentioned as early as 1869 when it was reported to be the rumoured name of a township which was derived from the River Wye in England and Wales to be laid out by government surveyors in the cadastral unit of the Hundred of Caroline. A school operated there between the years 1880 and 1882. The name is also reported as being originally used for a private sub-division within the Hundred of Caroline which was purchased in 1895 by Charles John Edwards. However the original allotments were too small and the land was subjected to further sub-division by Edwards’ daughter, Elizabeth Hunt and by David Skene in 1927. Boundaries were created on 31 October 1996 for the "long established name" which is reported as being derived from the sub-division rather the above-mentioned river. The locality's boundaries include the former Green Point Shack Area. A request from postal authorities for the name to be altered due to its similarity to Rye in the state of Victoria was not acted on by the relevant government agency.

Wye consists of land located along the continental coastline extending from the Green Point Road in the west and the state border in the east. The Glenelg River Road passes from Mount Gambier to the north through the locality to the town centre of Nelson in Victoria to the east. The coastline overlooks Discovery Bay and the eastern part of a subsidiary bay known as Brown Bay located to the west of the headland of Green Point and on the west side of the locality.

The majority land use within the locality is agriculture with a strip of land along the coastline being zoned for conservation purposes which includes the protected area known as the Piccaninnie Ponds Conservation Park.

Wye is located within the federal Division of Barker, the state electoral district of Mount Gambier and the local government area of the District Council of Grant.
