= Lestoidea conjuncta =

Common bluestreak

Conservation status
- Least Concern (IUCN 3.1)

Scientific classification
- Kingdom: Animalia
- Phylum: Arthropoda
- Clade: Pancrustacea
- Class: Insecta
- Order: Odonata
- Suborder: Zygoptera
- Family: Lestoideidae
- Genus: Lestoidea
- Species: L. conjuncta

Binomial name
- Lestoidea conjuncta Tillyard, 1913

Species of damselfly

Lestoidea conjuncta, commonly known as the common bluestreak, is a species of Australian damselfly in the family Lestoideidae.

It is endemic to coastal north-east Queensland, where it inhabits rainforest streams.

Lestoidea conjuncta is a medium-sized to large damselfly with dark coloration and dull orange to greenish markings.

== Taxonomic history ==
In 1913, Tillyard described Lestoidea conjuncta as the first species of the new genus Lestoidea.

Tillyard regarded the species as unusual because it appeared to combine characteristics of several damselfly groups then recognised as distinct.

For many years Lestoidea conjuncta was considered to be the only species in the genus. In 1967, Watson described a second species, Lestoidea barbarae, from north-east Queensland, noting differences in wing venation and male appendages.

In 1996, Günther Theischinger revised the genus and showed that some specimens previously identified as Lestoidea conjuncta represented distinct species. As part of this revision he described two additional species, Lestoidea brevicauda and Lestoidea lewisiana.

== Description ==
Lestoidea conjuncta is a medium-sized to large damselfly, dark brown to black in colour, with dull orange to greenish markings.

A pale spot is present at the base of each antenna. Males have distinctive appendages at the tip of the abdomen, with the upper pair bent sharply downward and ending in a blunt tip.

Females can be identified by the shape of the rear margin of the section behind the head, which is narrow and only slightly upturned at the sides.

== Distribution and habitat ==
Lestoidea conjuncta is endemic to coastal north-east Queensland, where it inhabits rainforest streams.

The species occurs from the Cairns region south to the Paluma area. It is more commonly associated with upland rainforest streams than some related species.

== Etymology ==
The genus name Lestoidea is derived from Lestes and the Greek suffix -οειδής (oeidēs, "resembling" or "having the form of"), indicating resemblance to that genus.

The species name conjuncta is derived from the Latin coniungo ("to join together"), referring to its apparent links to two distinct archaic groups within the family Agrionidae.

== Gallery ==
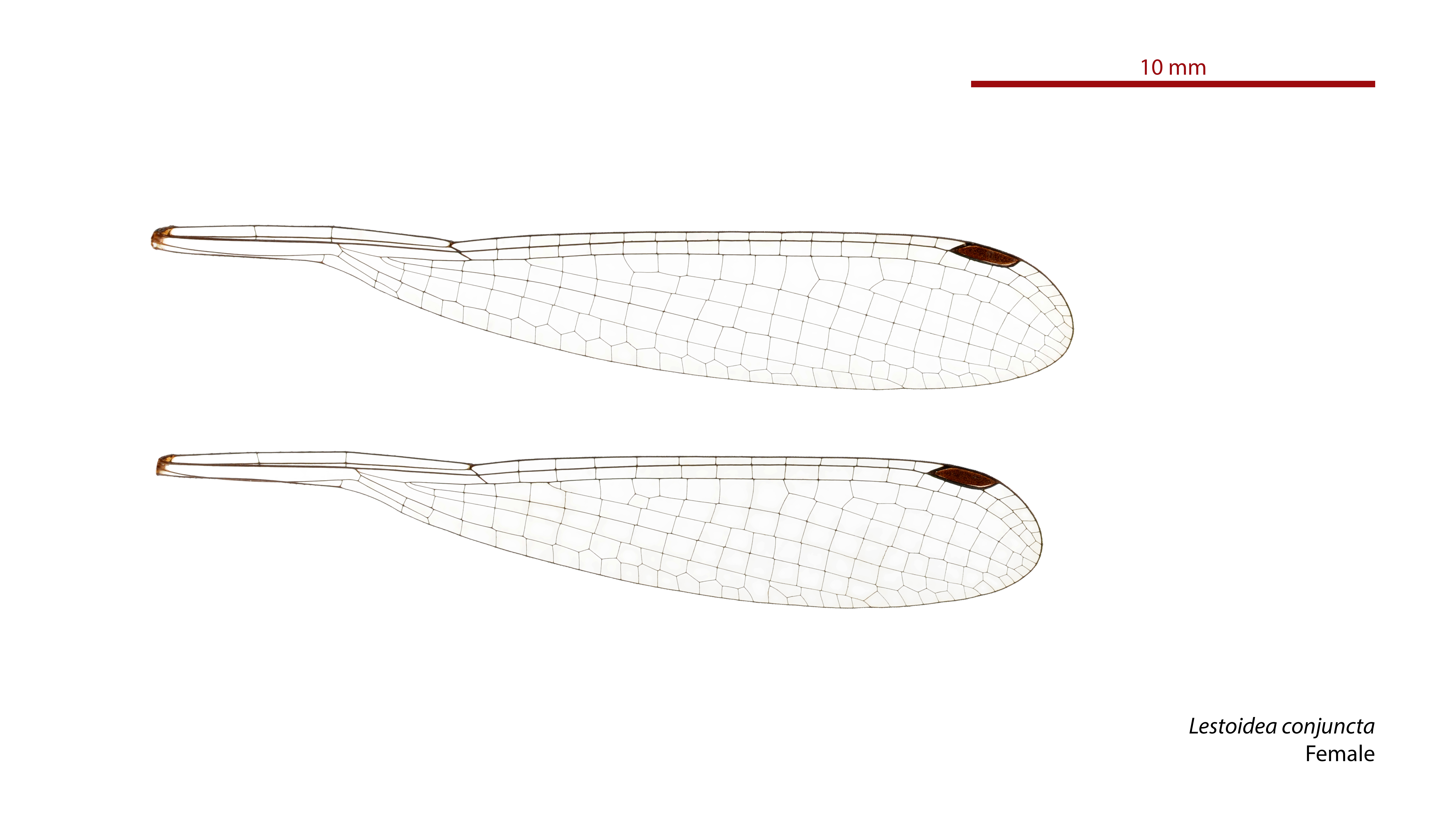
Female wings

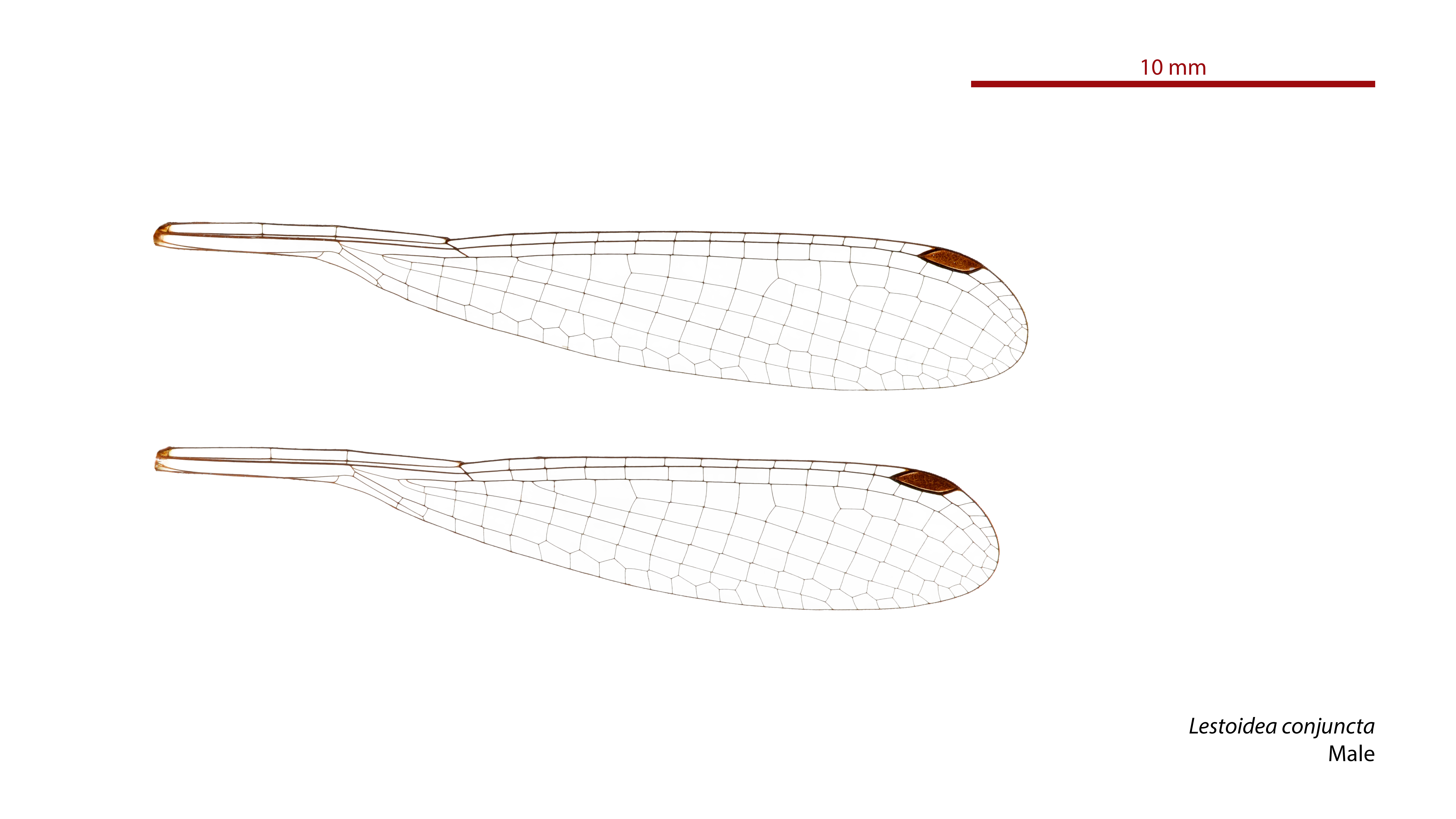
Male wings

== See also ==
- List of Odonata species of Australia
