= Caroline, South Australia =

Caroline
- Suburb
- Coordinates: 37.896910°S 140.921410°E
- Country: Australia
- State: South Australia
- Region: Limestone Coast
- LGA: District Council of Grant
- Location: 389 km (242 mi) south-east of Adelaide; 12 km (7.5 mi) southeast of Mount Gambier
- Established: 31 October 1996

Government
  - State electorate: Mount Gambier
  - Federal division: Barker

Population
  - Total: 11 (SAL 2021)
- Time zone: UTC+9:30 (ACST)
  - Summer (DST): UTC+10:30 (ACST)
- Postcode: 5291
- County: Grey
- Mean max temp: 19.0 °C (66.2 °F)
- Mean min temp: 8.2 °C (46.8 °F)
- Annual rainfall: 710.9 mm (27.99 in)
Suburbs around Caroline
Yahl	Glenburnie	Mumbannar
Caveton	Caroline	Mumbannar
Wye	Donovans	Mumbannar
- Coordinates; Locations; Climate; Adjoining localities

Caroline is a locality in the Australian state of South Australia located about 389 kilometres (242 mi) south-east of the state capital of Adelaide and about 12 kilometres (7.5 mi) southeast of the municipal seat of Mount Gambier adjoining the border with the state of Victoria.

Boundaries for the locality were created on 31 October 1996 for the “long established name” which was derived from the cadastral unit of the Hundred of Caroline. A school which operated from 1913 to 1917 opened with the name ‘Caroline East School’ which was changed to ‘Summer Hill’ in the following year while another known as ‘Hundred of Caroline School’ operated from 1893 to 1944.

Caroline is bounded in part on its north side by the Princes Highway and to the east by the border with Victoria.

The principal land use in the locality is primary production which is almost exclusively concerned with forestry. Five parcels of land within the locality have been proclaimed for conservation purposes as the Penambol Conservation Park and as the native forest reserves respectively known as Dry Creek, Honey Suckle, Laslett and Snow Gum.

Caroline is located within the federal division of Barker, the state electoral district of Mount Gambier and the local government area of the District Council of Grant.
