= Ewens Ponds =

Flooded sinkholes in South Australia

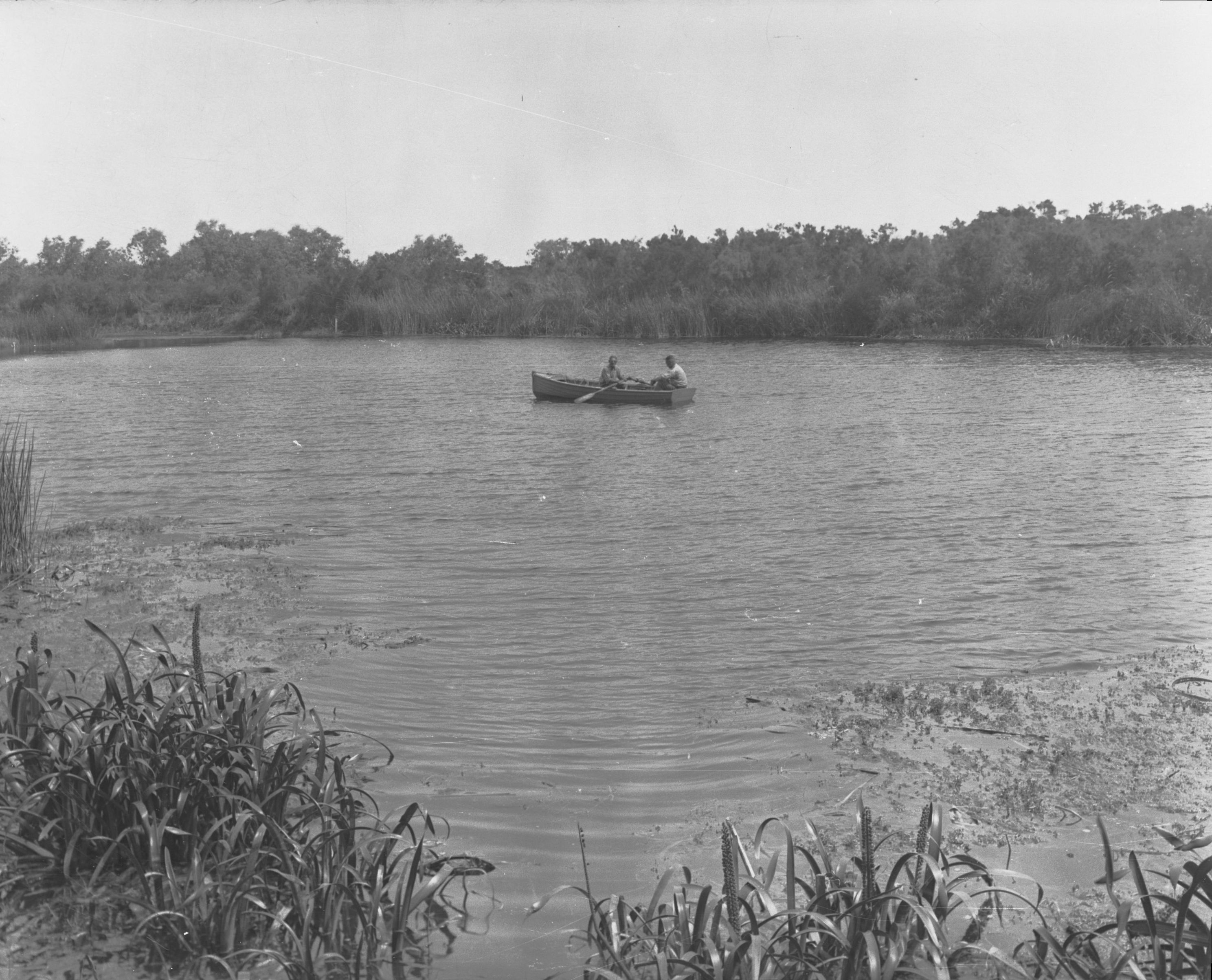
- Ewens Ponds, ca. 1945

- Location in South Australia
- Location: South Australia
- Coordinates: 38°01′36″S 140°47′26″E
- Type: Cenotes
- Primary outflows: Eight Mile Creek
- Catchment area: spring-fed water body
- Basin countries: Australia
- Max. length: Pond 1 - 50 metres (160 feet); Pond 2 - 38 metres (125 feet); Pond 3 - 19 metres (62 feet)
- Max. width: Pond 1 - 32 metres (105 feet); Pond 2 - 38 metres (125 feet); Pond 3 - 28 metres (92 feet)
- Average depth: Pond 1 - 9 metres (30 feet); Pond 2 - 9 metres (30 feet); Pond 3 - 13 metres (43 feet)
- Max. depth: 13 metres (43 feet)
- Water volume: Pond 1 - 28,000 cubic metres (990,000 cubic feet); Pond 2 - 212,000 cubic metres (7,500,000 cubic feet); Pond 3 - 4,400 cubic metres (160,000 cubic feet)
- Residence time: Pond 1 - 6 hours Pond 2 - 3 hours Pond 3 - 1.5 hours

Ewens Ponds is a series of three water-filled limestone sinkholes in the state of South Australia located in the gazetted locality of Eight Mile Creek, on the watercourse of Eight Mile Creek about 25 kilometres (16 miles) south of Mount Gambier and 8.4 kilometres (5.2 miles) east of Port MacDonnell. The ponds are popular with recreational divers due to their excellent underwater visibility. It has a small fish population including the endangered golden pygmy perch. Ewens Ponds has been part of the Ewens Ponds Conservation Park since 1976.

== History ==
The original inhabitants of the land are the Boandik group, of the Bungandidj people of Aboriginal people who lived in what is now south-eastern South Australia. The first European identified with the area was Thomas Ewens, whose dog chased a kangaroo into one of the ponds while he was hunting geese. Ewens reported his discovery of the ponds to the survey department and they became known as Thomas Ewens Spring Ponds.

The land surrounding the ponds was gradually cleared for agriculture and dairy farming and a drainage system built to draw water from the ponds for land sold for soldier settlement programs post-World War II.

In 1978 a trout farm was established utilising the waters flowing through Ewens Ponds. Although the ponds themselves are now part of a conservation park, the farm continues to operate. Water for the farm is drawn from the second pond, and wastewater discharged back into Eight Mile Creek downstream from the pond system.

== Geography ==
Each pond is a basin-shaped limestone doline approximately 9 metres (30 feet) deep and connected to the others by shallow watercourses called "races". The beds are covered with a fine silt layer and the floor of the third pond also contains a natural shallow cave. The ponds are located in a narrow band of native bush land, surrounded by cleared terrain. The landscape is characteristic of karst topography, shaped by the gradual dissolution of soluble limestone to form hollows and small caves, along with numerous large and relatively deep sinkholes (true cenotes).

The ponds contain extremely clear, high quality freshwater in which snorkellers and scuba divers can enjoy the wonder of swimming in a giant 'underwater garden', where the prolific plant life can easily be seen on the far side of each pond, more than 80 metres (260 feet) away in some areas. The clarity of the water also allows sufficient sunlight to penetrate that plant growth on the pond beds can reach up to 6 metres (20 feet) in height. The ponds are also occasionally affected by outbreaks of blue-green and other algae, though testing has found no evidence of health risks. In 2007 the South Australian Environmental Protection Agency suggested the algal blooms may be a result of continued concentrations of soluble nitrogen in both the ponds and the adjoining Eight Mile Creek, arising from infiltration of the groundwater by fertilisers, animal waste or wastewater.

== Fauna ==
The ponds are one of only three recorded locations for the golden pygmy perch (Nannoperca variegata). Other fish life includes schools of short-finned eel, river blackfish, pouched lampreys, mullet and common galaxias. The ponds are also home to populations of flatworms, freshwater crayfish and mussels, and the larva of the carnivorous caddis fly.

== Recreational activities ==
The ponds are owned and managed as a conservation park by the Department of Environment Water and Natural Resources (DEWNR). Plant and animal species in the ponds are protected and may not be removed.

High underwater visibility, the presence of rare and interesting fish, invertebrates and plants and the ponds' unique photographic potential have made them popular with scuba divers. Of particular interest in these clear waters is the actual observation of photosynthesis - aquatic plants can be seen releasing thin trails of bubbles as they convert carbon dioxide into oxygen. However divers are prohibited from entering caves or crevices on the pond beds and strongly discouraged from disturbing the silt layer as the resulting turbidity may harm plant life. Divers enter at the First Pond, drift with the current through the First Race to the Second Pond, and then continue through the Second Race to the Third Pond before exiting the water via a ladder there. However, some divers (especially snorkellers) occasionally attempt to vigorously swim upstream through the races to return to Ponds One or Two, thereby disturbing the water plants lining the races, and this practice is strongly discouraged by the diving community. The general water temperature of the ponds is around 15 °C (60 °F).

== Protected area status ==
Ewens Ponds and some adjoining land has enjoyed protected area status since 1976 when proclaimed as a conservation park under the National Parks and Wildlife Act 1972.

== See also ==
- Piccaninnie Ponds Conservation Park – Protected area near Mount Gambier in South Australia
- List of sinkholes of Australia – Links to Wikipedia articles on sinkholes, blue holes, dolines, cenotes, and pit caves
