= Lestoidea brevicauda =

Short-tipped bluestreak

Conservation status
- Near Threatened (IUCN 3.1)

Scientific classification
- Kingdom: Animalia
- Phylum: Arthropoda
- Clade: Pancrustacea
- Class: Insecta
- Order: Odonata
- Suborder: Zygoptera
- Family: Lestoideidae
- Genus: Lestoidea
- Species: L. brevicauda

Binomial name
- Lestoidea brevicauda Theischinger, 1996

Species of damselfly

Lestoidea brevicauda, commonly known as the short-tipped bluestreak, is a species of Australian damselfly in the family Lestoideidae.

It is endemic to north-east Queensland, where it inhabits rainforest streams.

Lestoidea brevicauda is a medium-sized to large damselfly, dark brown to black in colour, with dull orange to greenish markings.

== Taxonomic history ==
In 1996, Günther Theischinger described Lestoidea brevicauda during a revision of the genus Lestoidea.

Prior to this revision, specimens of Lestoidea brevicauda had generally been identified as Lestoidea conjuncta.

Theischinger distinguished Lestoidea brevicauda from related species by differences in the shape of the male appendages and the structure of the female thorax behind the head.

== Description ==
Lestoidea brevicauda is a medium-sized to large damselfly, dark brown to black in colour, with dull orange to greenish markings.

A pale spot is present at the base of each antenna. Males have distinctive appendages at the tip of the abdomen, with the upper pair bent sharply downward and ending in a short rounded tip.

Females can be identified by the broad rear margin of the section behind the head, with the sides strongly upturned.

== Distribution and habitat ==
Lestoidea brevicauda is endemic to north-east Queensland, where it inhabits rainforest streams.

The species is associated mainly with lower-altitude rainforest streams in the northern part of the range of the genus.

== Etymology ==
The genus name Lestoidea is derived from Lestes and the Greek suffix -οειδής (oeidēs, "resembling" or "having the form of"), indicating resemblance to that genus.

The species name brevicauda is derived from the Latin brevis ("short") and cauda ("tail"), referring to the short appendages at the tip of the male abdomen.

== Gallery ==
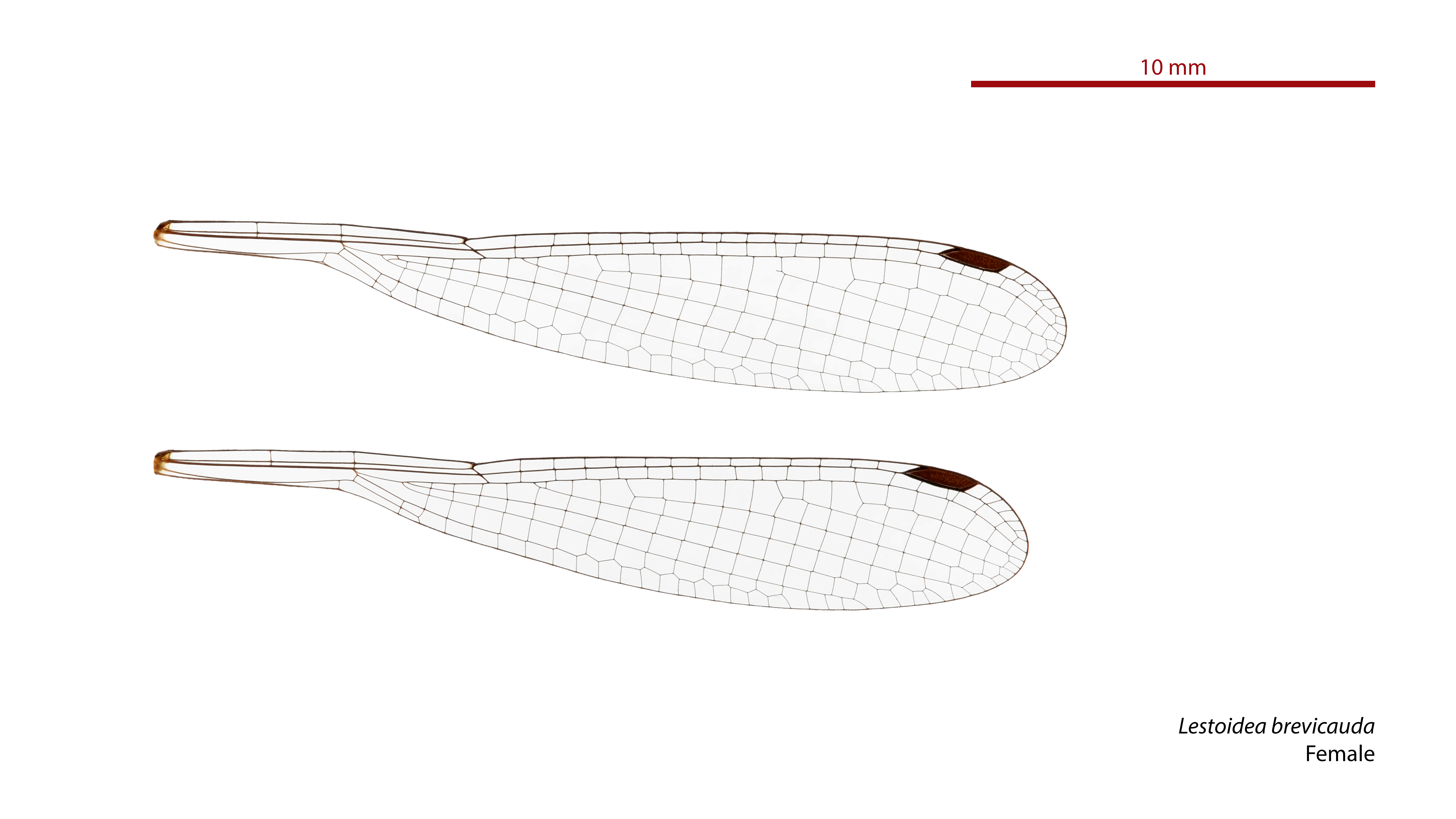
Female wings

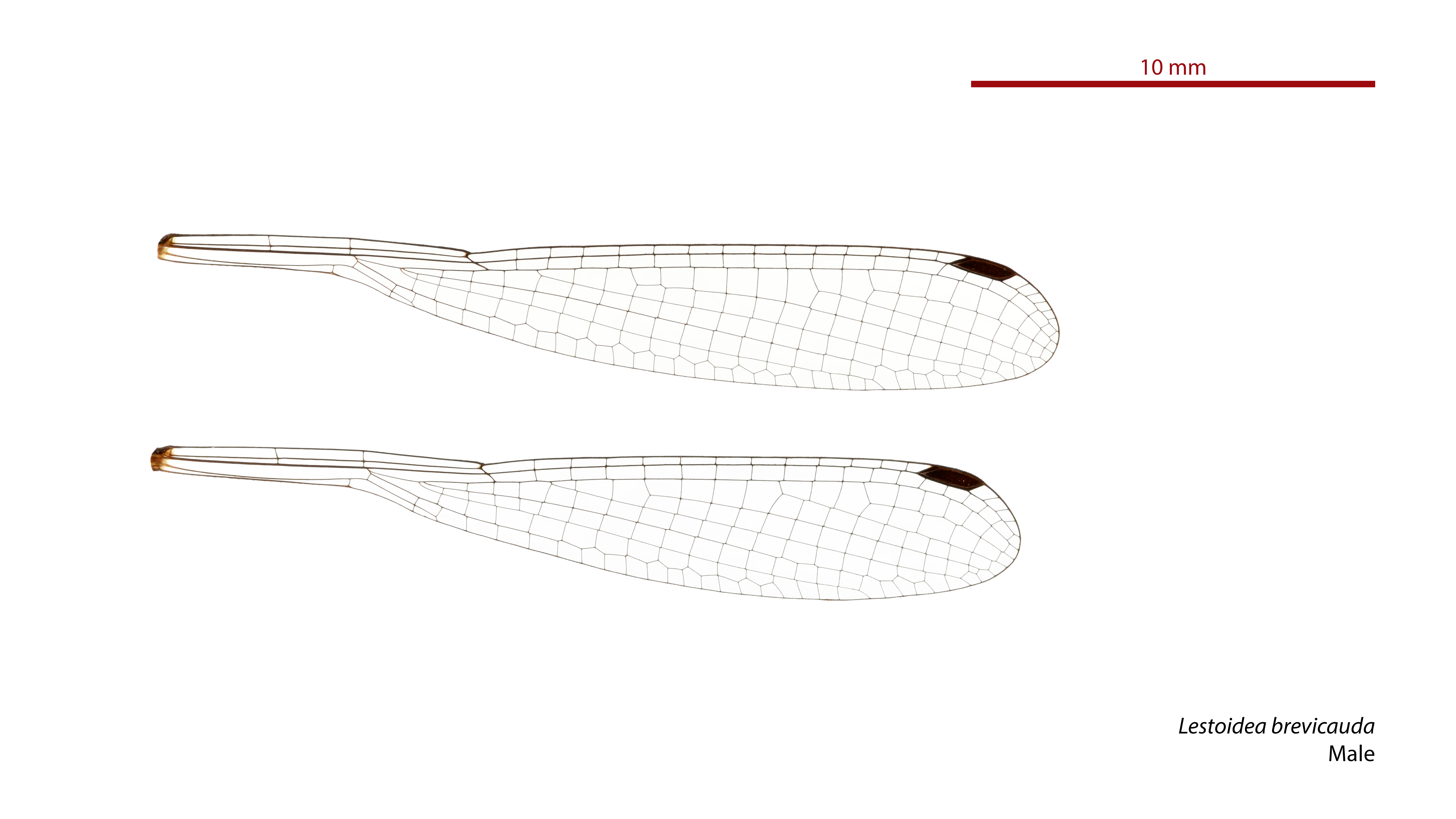
Male wings

== See also ==
- List of Odonata species of Australia
