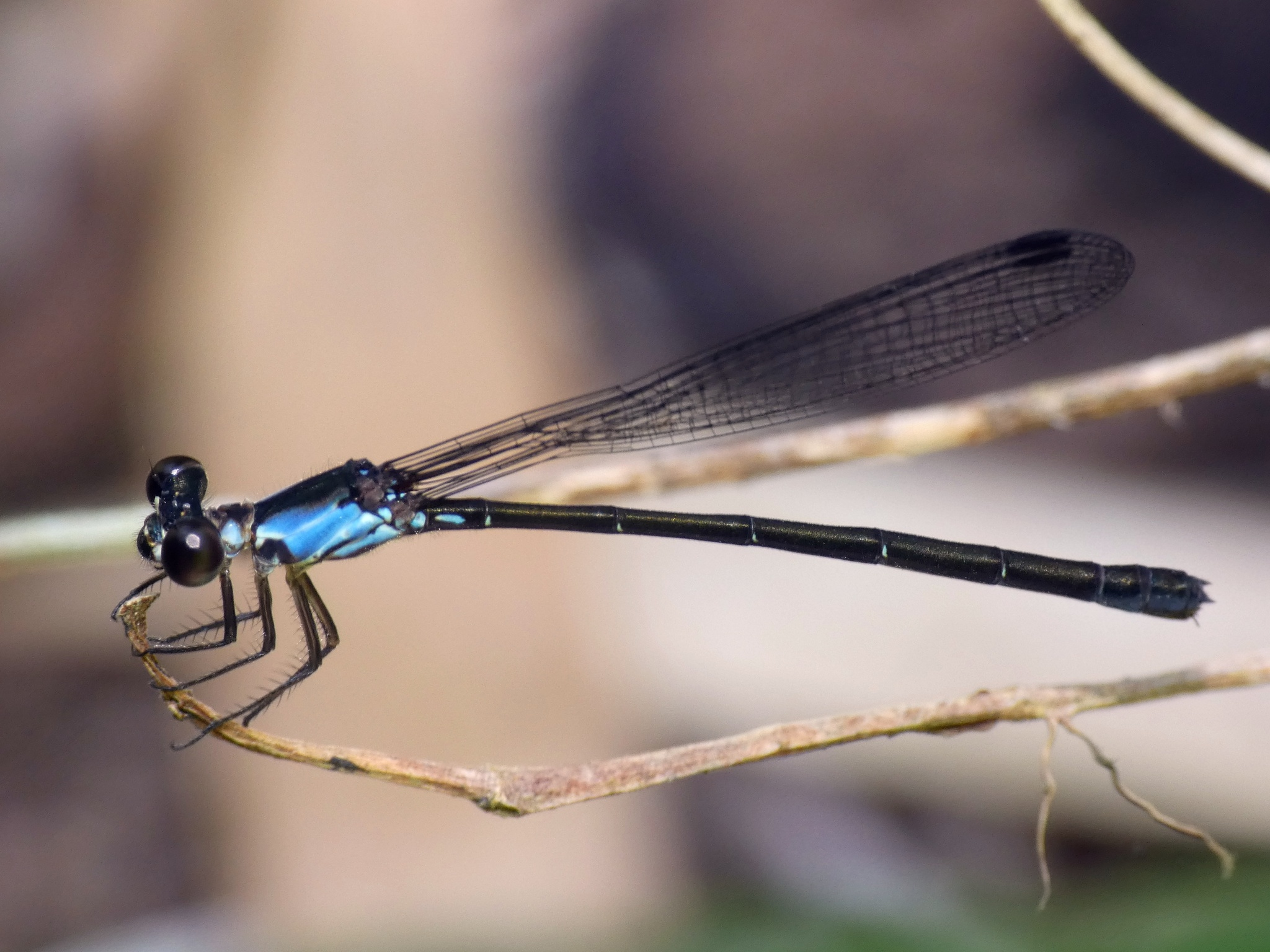
- Female

Conservation status
- Vulnerable (IUCN 3.1)

Scientific classification
- Kingdom: Animalia
- Phylum: Arthropoda
- Clade: Pancrustacea
- Class: Insecta
- Order: Odonata
- Suborder: Zygoptera
- Family: Lestoideidae
- Genus: Lestoidea
- Species: L. barbarae

Binomial name
- Lestoidea barbarae Watson, 1967

= Lestoidea barbarae =

Large bluestreak

Species of damselfly

Lestoidea barbarae, commonly known as the large bluestreak, is a species of Australian damselfly in the family Lestoideidae.

It is known only from rainforest streams in the vicinity of Wooroonooran National Park in north-east Queensland.

Lestoidea barbarae is a medium-sized to large damselfly, dark brown to black in colour, with dull orange to greenish markings.

== Taxonomic history ==
In 1967, Watson described Lestoidea barbarae from specimens collected in north-east Queensland.

Prior to its discovery, Lestoidea conjuncta was considered to be the only species in the genus.

Watson distinguished Lestoidea barbarae from Lestoidea conjuncta by differences in wing venation and the shape of the male appendages.

== Description ==
Lestoidea barbarae is a medium-sized to large damselfly, dark brown to black in colour, with dull orange to greenish markings.

Males have distinctive appendages at the tip of the abdomen, with the upper pair forming a broad angle when viewed from the side.

Females differ from related species in the shape of the rear margin of the section behind the head, which forms a single continuous lobe.

== Distribution and habitat ==
Lestoidea barbarae is endemic to north-east Queensland and is known only from rainforest streams in the vicinity of Wooroonooran National Park.

The species appears to have a highly restricted distribution.

== Etymology ==
The genus name Lestoidea is derived from Lestes and the Greek suffix -οειδής (oeidēs, "resembling" or "having the form of"), indicating resemblance to that genus.

In 1967, Tony Watson named this species barbarae, honouring his wife, Barbara.

== Gallery ==
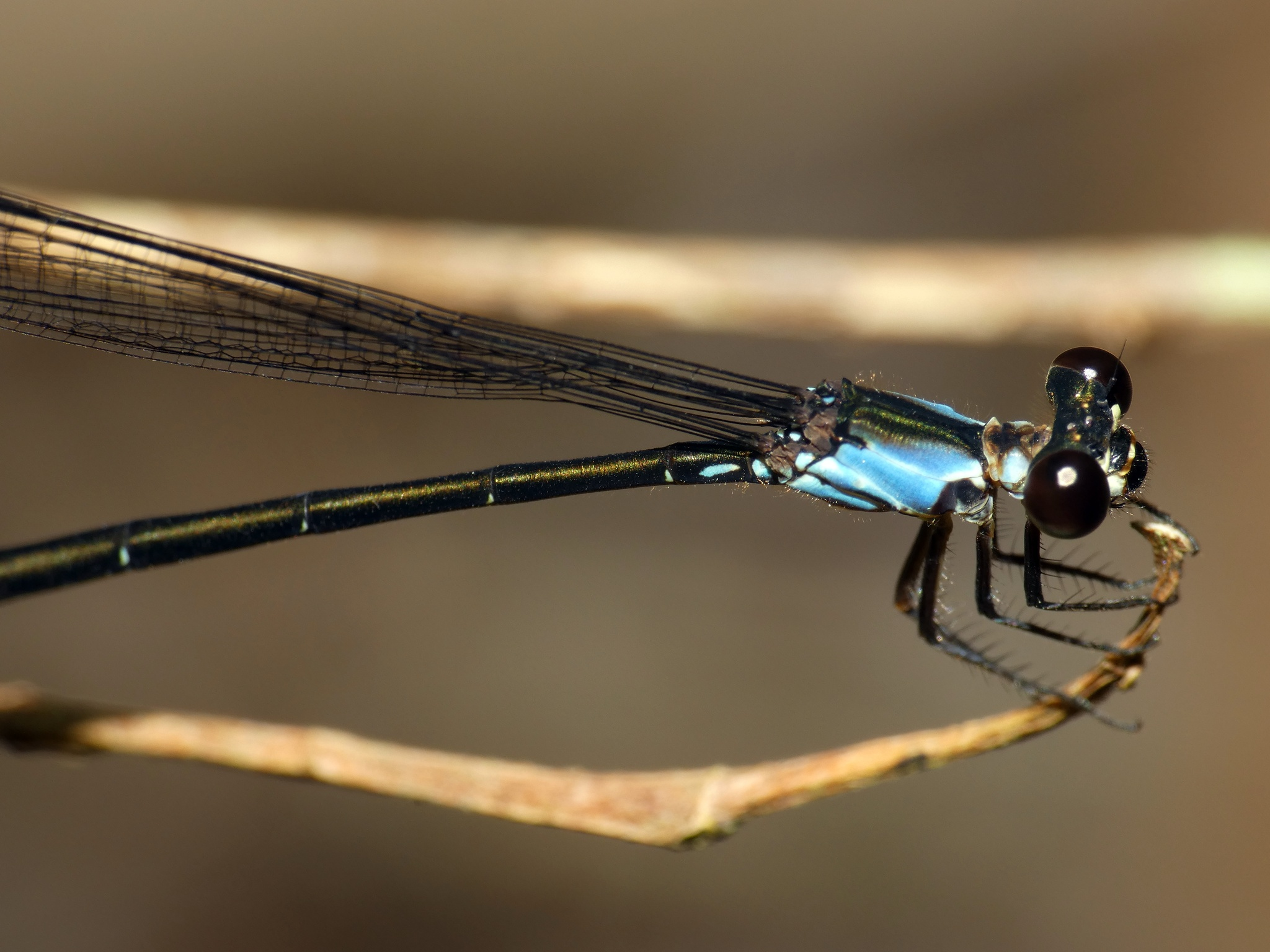
Female

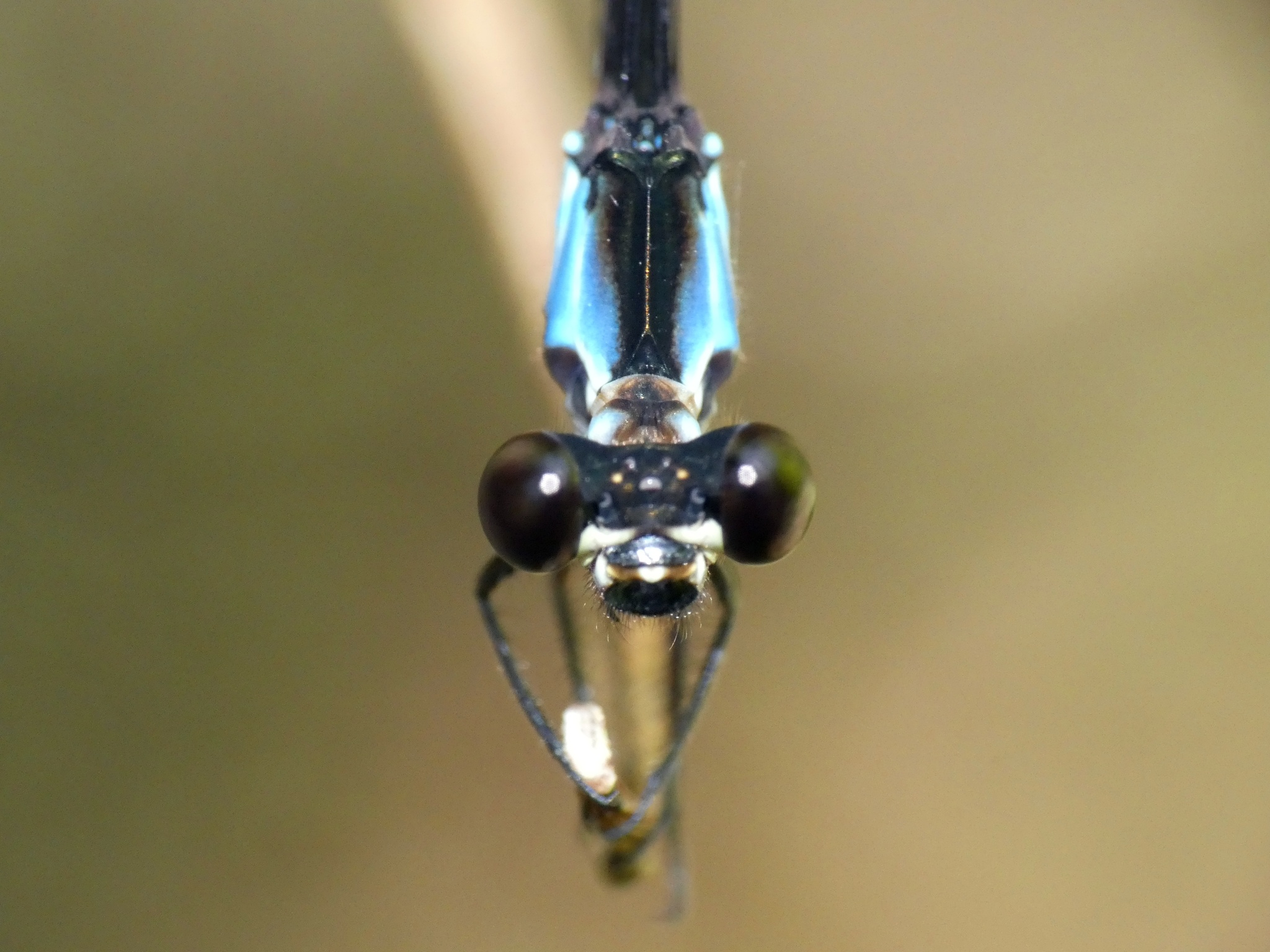
Female

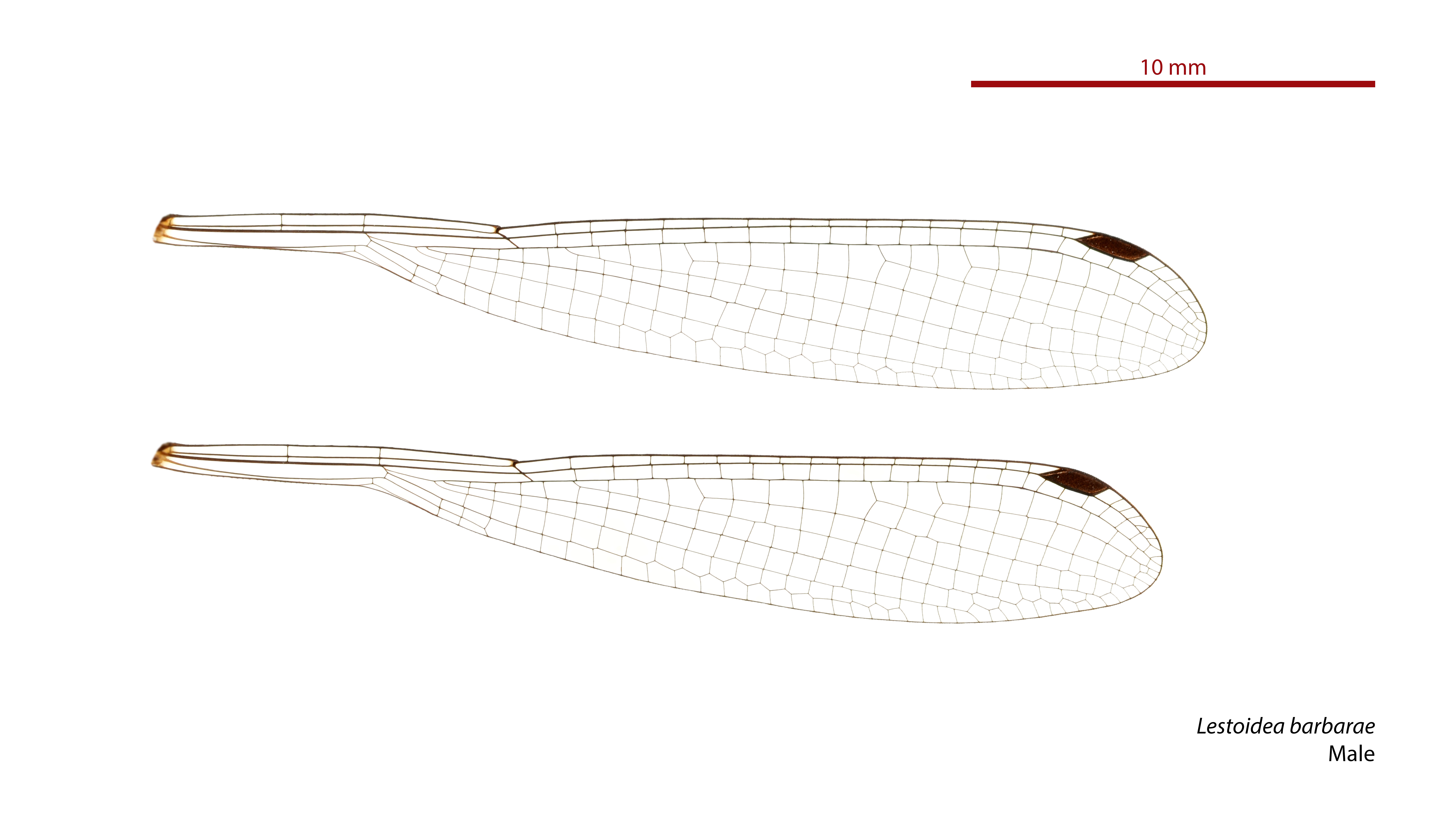
Male wings

== See also ==
- List of Odonata species of Australia
