= Ewens Ponds Conservation Park =

Protected area in South Australia

- IUCN category III (natural monument or feature)
- Location within South Australia
- Location: South Australia
- Nearest city: Port MacDonnell
- Coordinates: 38°01′36″S 140°47′26″E
- Area: 36 ha (89 acres)
- Established: 9 September 1976
- Governing body: Department for Environment and Water
- Website: Official website

Ewens Ponds Conservation Park is a protected area in the Australian state of South Australia consisting of the Ewens Ponds and some adjoining land in the gazetted locality of Eight Mile Creek about 8.4 kilometres (5.2 miles) east of Port MacDonnell in South Australia and about 25 kilometres (16 miles) south of Mount Gambier. The conservation park was proclaimed in 1976 under National Parks and Wildlife Act 1972. The conservation park was proclaimed for the following reasons:

The conservation park contains remnants of the terrestrial and aquatic vegetation communities which existed prior to clearing and development. The fauna within the conservation park is also relatively unique within South Australia and the physical features of the ponds are unique within Australia.

The conservation park is classified as an IUCN Category III protected area.
