= Lower South East Marine Park =

Protected area in South Australia

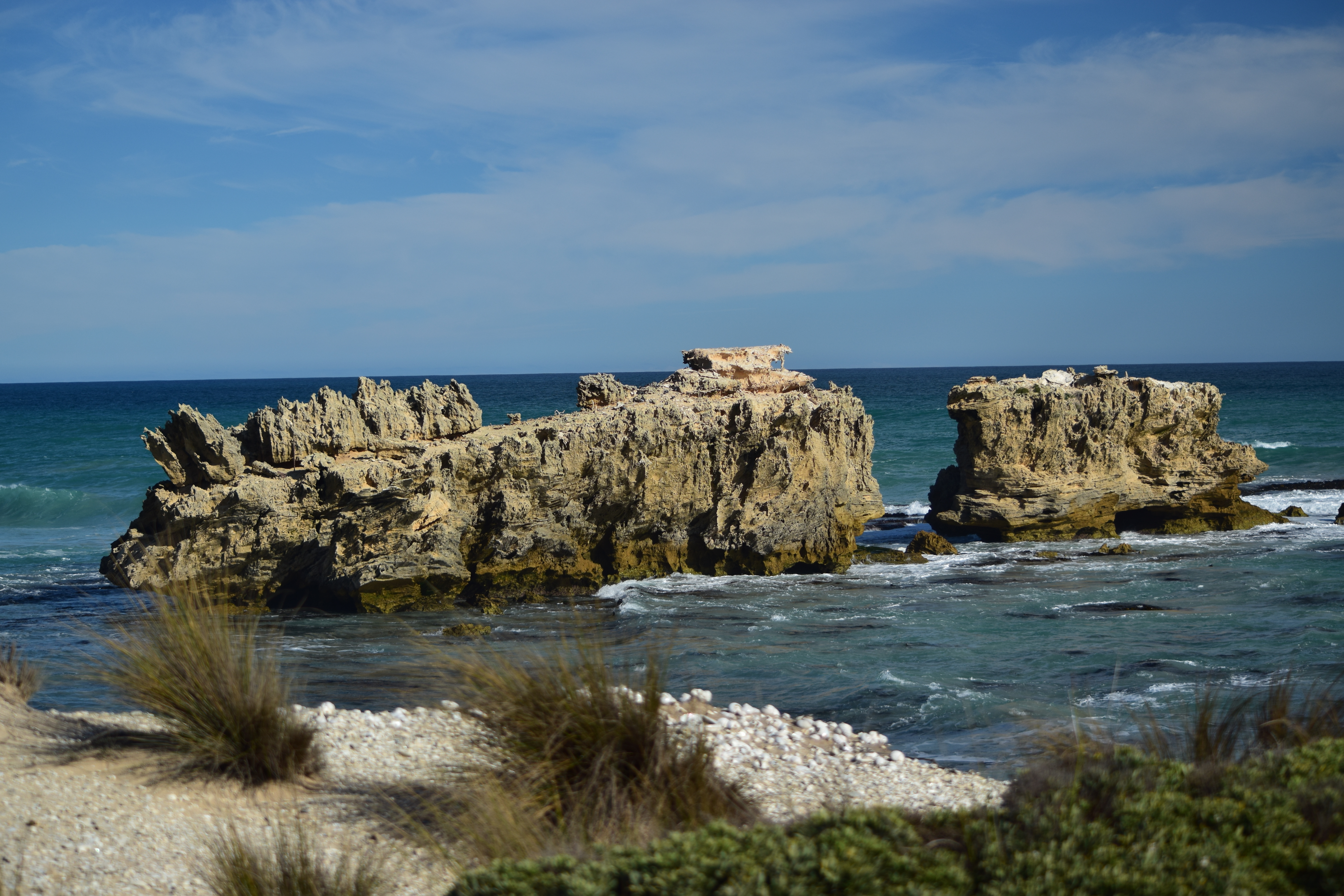
- Mounce and Battye Rocks are located within the marine park

- Location within South Australia
- Location: South Australia
- Nearest city: Mount Gambier
- Coordinates: 37°53′35″S 140°20′06″E
- Area: 360 km^{2} (140 sq mi)
- Established: 29 January 2009
- Governing body: Department of Environment and Water
- Website: Official website

Lower South East Marine Park is a marine protected area in the Australian state of South Australia located in the state's coastal waters in the state’s south-east adjoining the border with the state of Victoria.

The Lower South East Marine Park consists of two parts which extend from "median high water" to the edge of coastal waters. The first part extends from Cape Buffon in the north-west to just north of Cape Banks in the south-east adjoining coastline within the boundary of the Canunda National Park. The second part which is largely within Discovery Bay extends from “Port MacDonnell Bay” [sic] in the west to the state border in the east. This part “partially overlays” the southern boundary of the part of the Piccaninnie Ponds Conservation Park which extends to low water.

The marine park was established on 29 January 2009 by proclamation under the Marine Parks Act 2007 and its extent was subsequently varied on 23 July 2009.

The marine park is divided into zones to managing the marine environment to ensure varying degrees of “protection for habitats and biodiversity” and varying levels of “ecologically sustainable development and use” as follows:

1. Two “sanctuary zones” adjoining the coastlines with the Canunda National Park and the Piccaninnie Ponds Conservation Park where “the removal or harm of plants, animals or marine products” is prohibited,
2. Three “habitat protection zones” where “activities and uses that do not harm habitats or the functioning of ecosystems” are only permitted,
3. Two “general managed use zones” where “ecologically sustainable development and use” is allowed, and
4. Two “special purpose areas” which do overlap some of the above zones and are concerned with "harbor activities" near Cape Buffon and with "shore-based recreational line fishing" on the coastline with the Piccaninnie Ponds Conservation Park.

As of 2016, zones within the marine park has been classified using the system of protected area categories developed by the International Union for Conservation of Nature, with the “sanctuary zones” being IUCN Category II, the “habitat protection zones” being IUCN Category IV and the “general managed use zones” being IUCN Category VI.

== See also ==
- Protected areas of South Australia
