= Lestoidea lewisiana =

Mount Lewis bluestreak

Conservation status
- Endangered (IUCN 3.1)

Scientific classification
- Kingdom: Animalia
- Phylum: Arthropoda
- Clade: Pancrustacea
- Class: Insecta
- Order: Odonata
- Suborder: Zygoptera
- Family: Lestoideidae
- Genus: Lestoidea
- Species: L. lewisiana

Binomial name
- Lestoidea lewisiana Theischinger, 1996

Species of damselfly

Lestoidea lewisiana, commonly known as the Mount Lewis bluestreak, is a species of Australian damselfly in the family Lestoideidae.

It is known only from Mount Lewis in north-east Queensland, where it inhabits rainforest streams.

Lestoidea lewisiana is a medium-sized to large damselfly, dark brown to black in colour, with dull orange to greenish markings.

== Taxonomic history ==
In 1996, Günther Theischinger described Lestoidea lewisiana during a revision of the genus Lestoidea.

Prior to this revision, specimens of Lestoidea lewisiana had generally been identified as Lestoidea conjuncta.

Theischinger distinguished Lestoidea lewisiana from related species by differences in the shape of the male appendages and the structure of the female thorax behind the head.

== Description ==
Lestoidea lewisiana is a medium-sized to large damselfly, dark brown to black in colour, with dull orange to greenish markings.

Unlike other species of Lestoidea, Lestoidea lewisiana lacks the pale spot at the base of each antenna.

Males have distinctive appendages at the tip of the abdomen, with the upper pair forming a moderate angle when viewed from the side.

Females can be identified by the broad rear margin of the section behind the head, with the sides strongly upturned.

== Distribution and habitat ==
Lestoidea lewisiana is endemic to north-east Queensland and is known only from Mount Lewis, where it inhabits rainforest streams.

The species appears to have a highly restricted distribution.

== Etymology ==
The genus name Lestoidea is derived from Lestes and the Greek suffix -οειδής (oeidēs, "resembling" or "having the form of"), indicating resemblance to that genus.

The species name lewisiana means "associated with Mount Lewis", referring to its type locality in Far North Queensland.

== Gallery ==
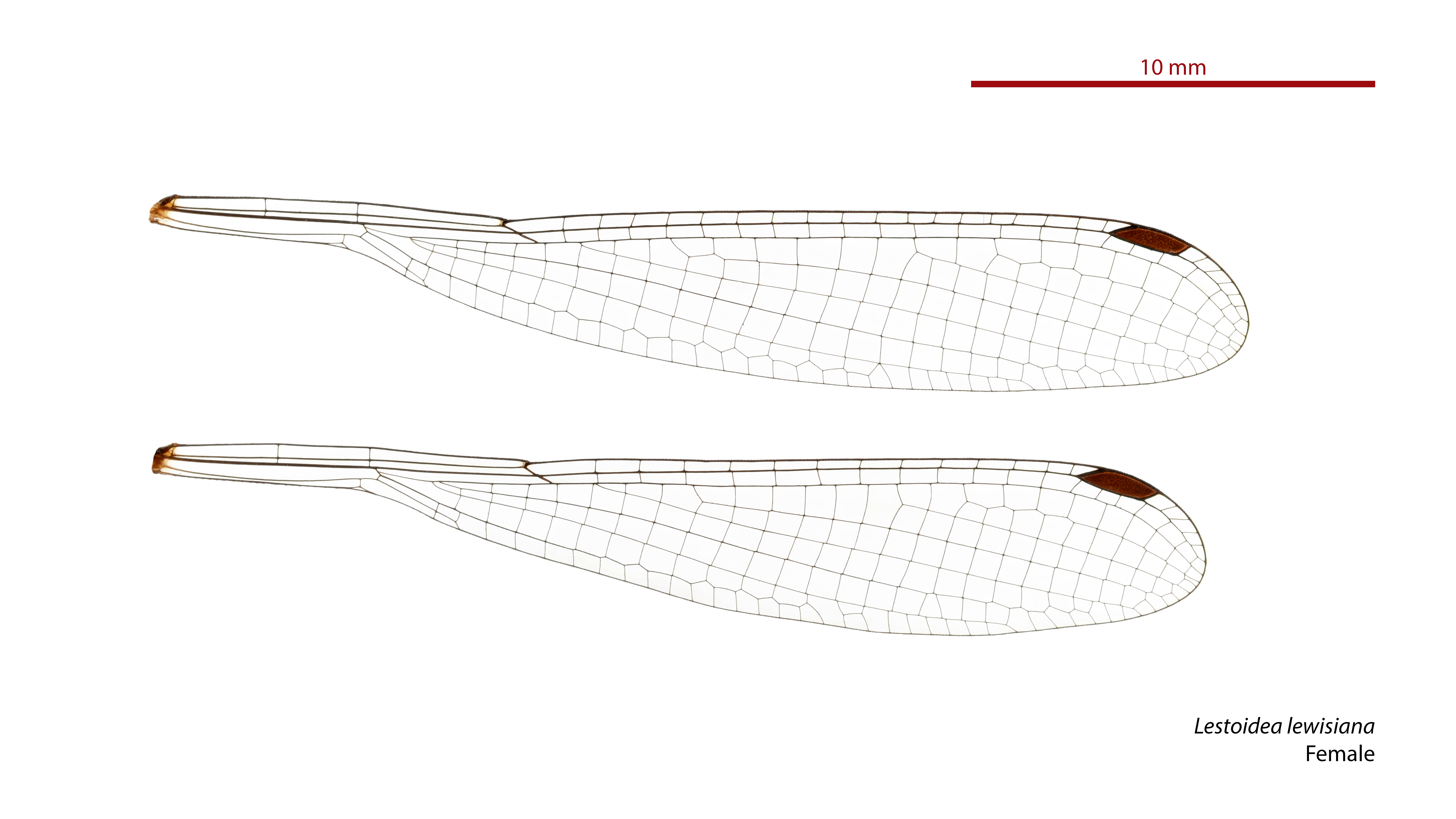
Female wings

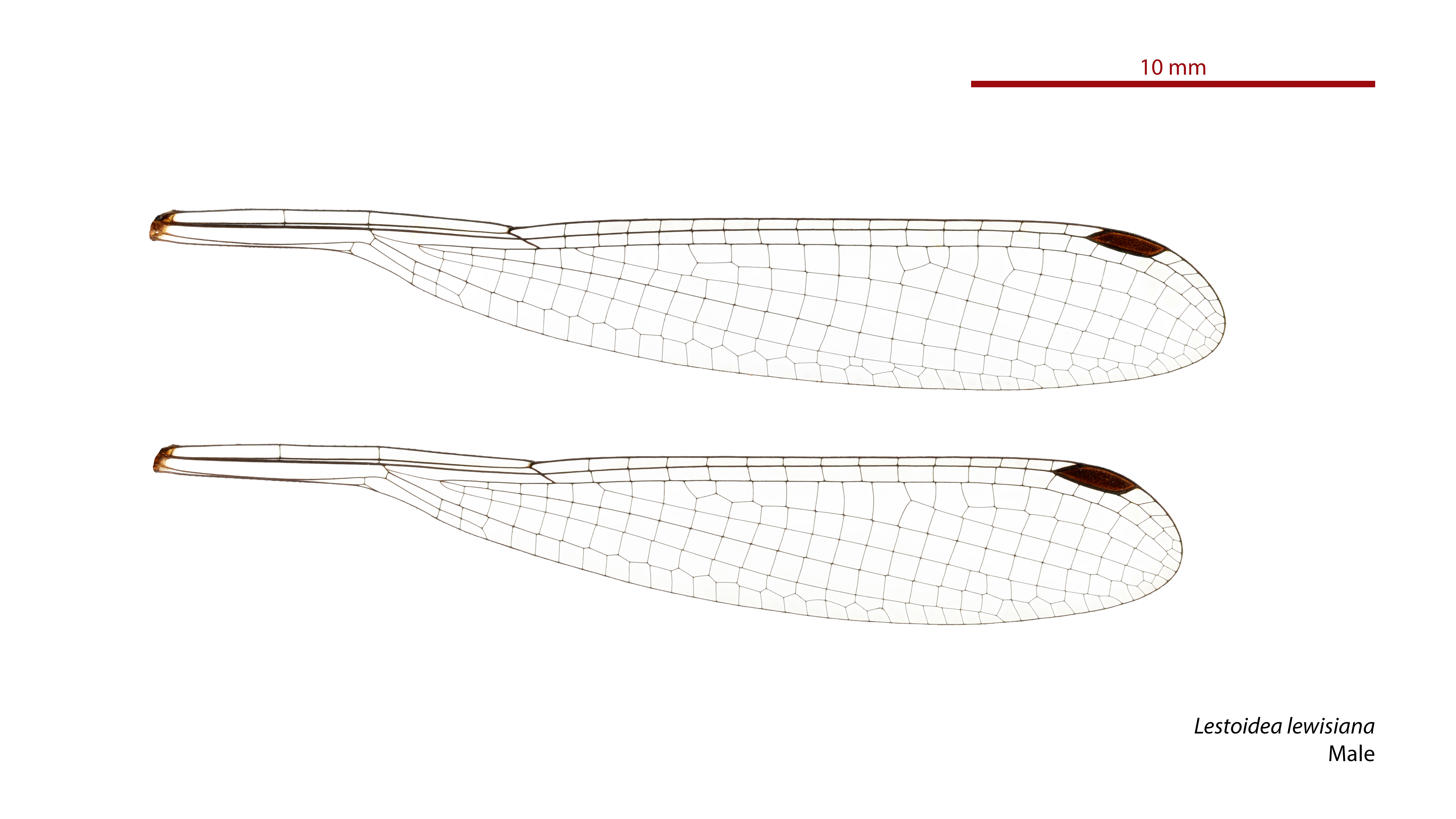
Male wings

== See also ==
- List of Odonata species of Australia
