= Discovery Bay (Australia) =

Bay in southeastern Australia

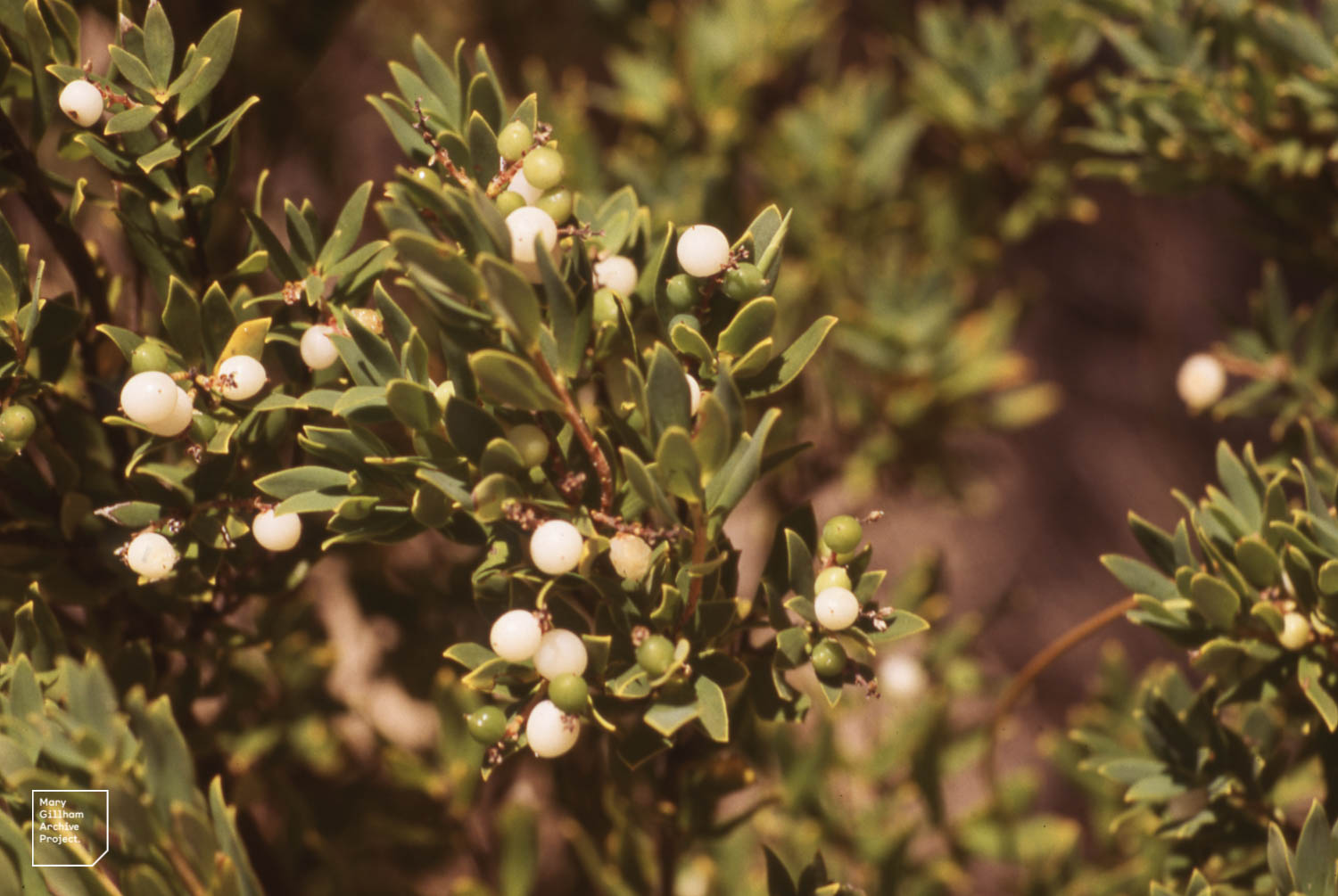
- West Victoria Coast, Bridgewater, Cape Nelson, Portland, Point Danger

- Location in Australia
- Location: Eastern South Australia and western Victoria
- Coordinates: 38°03′S 140°52′E
- Type: An open oceanic embayment
- Primary inflows: Glenelg River, Bridgewater Lakes
- Primary outflows: Southern Ocean
- Basin countries: Australia
- Average depth: 30–60 m (98–197 ft)
- Shore length^{1}: 70 km (43 mi)
- Frozen: never
- Settlements: Port MacDonnell
- ^{1} Shore length is not a well-defined measure.

Discovery Bay is an open oceanic embayment lying along the coast of eastern South Australia and western Victoria in south-eastern Australia.

== Location and features ==
Facing the Southern Ocean, Discovery Bay extends approximately 70 kilometres (43 mi) from Cape Northumberland, near Port MacDonnell, South Australia in the northwest, to Cape Bridgewater in the southeast, 20 kilometres (12 mi) west of Portland in western Victoria. Cape Northumberland is the southernmost point of mainland South Australia. The Glenelg River is the principal inflow and enters the bay near the town of Nelson.

The bay was named by explorer Thomas Mitchell when he came down the river on 20 August 1836.

The South Australian section of the bay's coastline is protected by the Lower South East Marine Park while the Victorian section of the coast is protected in the Discovery Bay Coastal Park. The waters at the eastern end of the bay, adjacent to Cape Bridgewater, are protected by the Discovery Bay Marine National Park.

== See also ==
- Discovery Bay (disambiguation)
- Piccaninnie Ponds Conservation Park
