= Eight Mile Creek, South Australia =

Eight Mile Creek South Australia
- Coordinates: 38°01′10″S 140°47′42″E
- Population: 163 (SAL 2021)
- Established: 31 October 1996
- Postcode(s): 5291
- Time zone: ACST (UTC+9:30)
  - Summer (DST): ACST (UTC+10:30)
- Location: 399 km (248 mi) south-east of Adelaide city centre; 24 km (15 mi) south of Mount Gambier
- LGA(s): District Council of Grant
- Region: Limestone Coast
- County: County of Grey
- State electorate(s): Mount Gambier
- Federal division(s): Barker
| Mean max temp | Mean min temp | Annual rainfall |
| 19.0 °C; 66 °F | 8.2 °C; 47 °F | 708.4 mm 27.9 in |
Suburbs around Eight Mile Creek:
| Allendale East | Allendale East; Caveton | Wye |
| Allendale East; Port MacDonnell | Eight Mile Creek | Wye |
| Ocean | Ocean | Ocean |
- Footnotes: Locations; Climate; Adjoining localities

Eight Mile Creek is a locality in the Australian state of South Australia located on the state's south-east coast overlooking the body of water known in Australia as the Southern Ocean and by international authorities as the Great Australian Bight. It is about 399 kilometres (248 miles) south-east of the state capital of Adelaide and about 24 kilometres (15 miles) south of the municipal seat of Mount Gambier in the south-east of the state.

Boundaries were created on 31 October 1996 for the “long established name” which is derived from the watercourse located within its extent.

The majority land use within the locality is agriculture with a strip of land along the coastline being zoned for both residential use and conservation purposes. The locality also includes the protected area known as Ewens Ponds Conservation Park which contains the system of natural water bodies known as Ewens Ponds.

Eight Mile Creek is located within the federal division of Barker, the state electoral district of Mount Gambier and the local government area of the District Council of Grant.
