= Donovans, South Australia =

Donovans South Australia
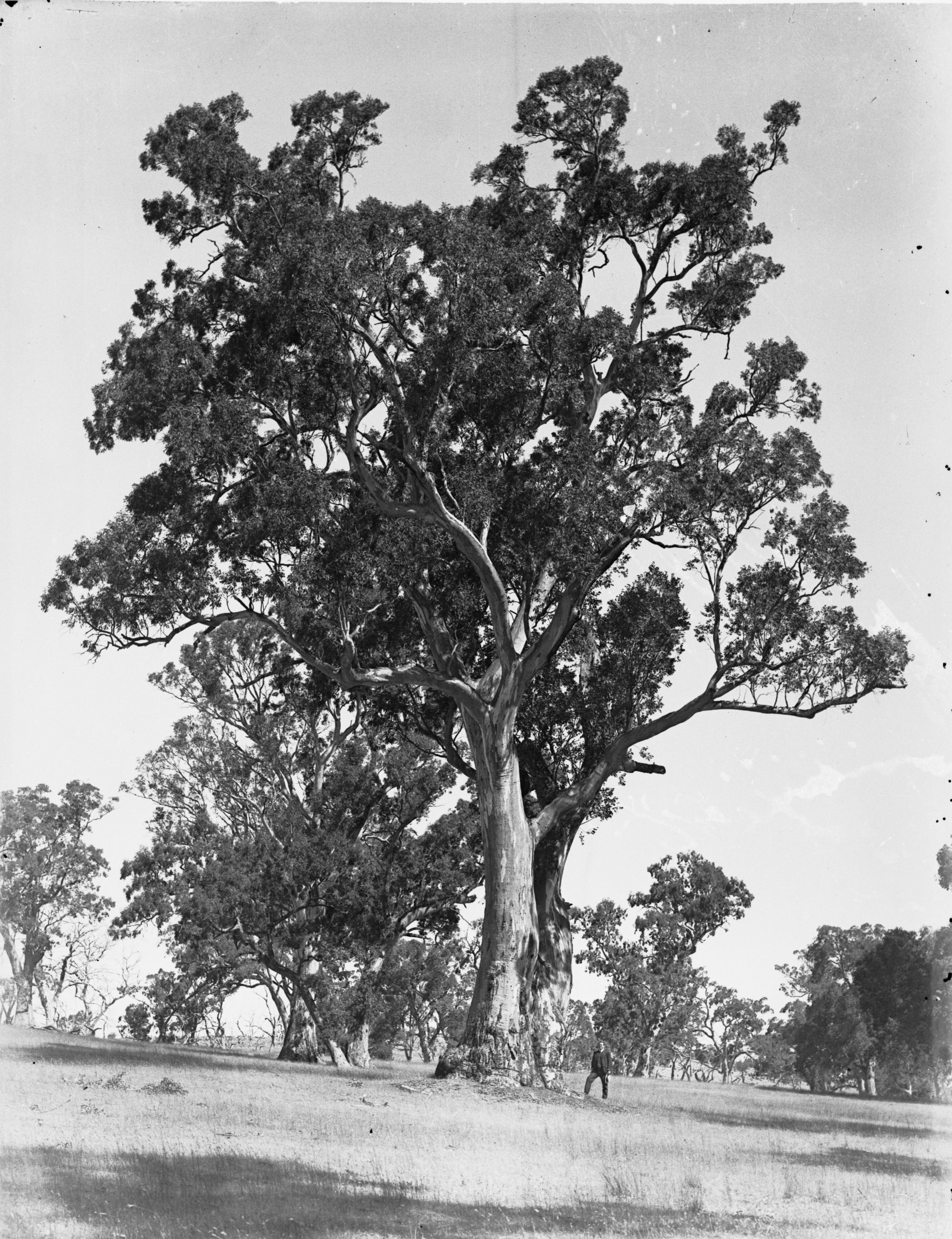
- Big Tree, ca. 1932

- Coordinates: 38.012°S 140.96°E
- Population: 111 (SAL 2021)
- Established: 1947 (town); 31 October 1996 (locality)
- Postcode(s): 5291
- Location: 403 km (250 mi) South East of Adelaide; 26 km (16 mi) South East of Mount Gambier
- LGA(s): District Council of Grant
- Region: Limestone Coast
- County: County of Grey
- State electorate(s): Mount Gambier
- Federal division(s): Barker
Mean max temp	Mean min temp	Annual rainfall
19.0 °C; 66 °F	8.2 °C; 47 °F	708.4 mm 27.9 in
Localities around Donovans:
Caroline	Caroline	Munbannar
Wye	Donovans	Nelson
Wye	Wye	Nelson
- Footnotes: Coordinates; Locations; Climate; Adjoining localities

Donovans is a locality in the Australian state of South Australia located in the state's south-east on the Glenelg River adjoining the border with the state of Victoria. It is about 403 kilometres (250 miles) south-east of the state capital of Adelaide and 26 kilometres (16 miles) south-east of the centre of the city of Mount Gambier.

The name was approved in 1942 by the Nomenclature Committee for a private sub-division in the cadastral unit of the Hundred of Caroline. The sub-division was approved at some time during the 1940s with one source stating that it occurred in 1943 while another states the year of approval was 1947. Prior to the subdivision it was known as 'Donovan's Landing'. Boundaries were created on 31 October 1996 for the "long established name" which was derived from the name of the sub-division rather from the name 'Donovan's Landing'.

Donovans consists of land adjoining the border with the state of Victoria which includes a loop of the Glenelg River. A settlement is located on the west side of the river while the land on the east side of the river has been declared as the protected area known as the Lower Glenelg River Conservation Park.

It was described in 1926 by the newspaper, The Register, as follows:

With his customary zeal our guide secured a number of motor vehicles to convey us to a point on the Glenelg River called Donovan's... The scenery in the vicinity of this river is very fine. The cliffs in many places rise sheer out of the water to a considerable height and at other spots the trees and foliage complete a charming spectacle. The owner of the property has a motor launch [and] the stuffed carcass of the original 'Tantanoola Tiger', which caused a great stir in these parts some years ago and was shot by Mr. Tom Donovan, was on show and was an object of much curiosity...

The majority land use within the locality is agriculture which includes the above-mentioned conservation park while the settlement is zoned for residential use.

Donovans is located within the federal Division of Barker, the state electoral district of Mount Gambier and the local government area of the District Council of Grant.
