= Discovery Bay Coastal Park =

Protected area in Victoria, Australia

- IUCN category V (protected landscape/seascape)
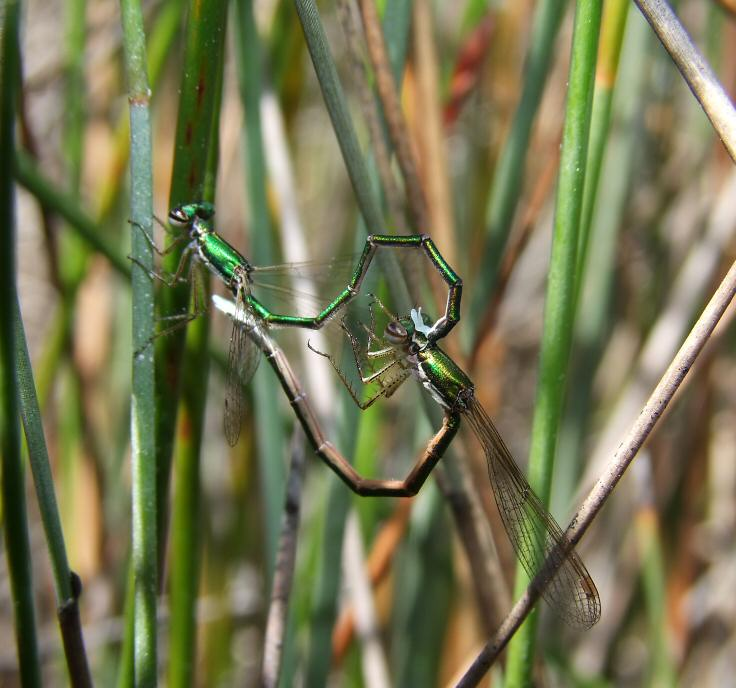
- Ancient Greenling (damselfly)

- Location within Victoria
- Location: Victoria
- Nearest city: Portland and Mount Gambier
- Coordinates: 38°10′S 141°14′E
- Area: 104.6 km^{2} (40.4 sq mi)
- Established: 1979
- Governing body: Parks Victoria
- Website: Official website

The Discovery Bay Coastal Park is a linear protected area of coastal land in western Victoria, south-eastern Australia. The 10,460-hectare (25,800-acre) park extends along the coast of Discovery Bay from Cape Nelson north-westwards for 50 kilometres (31 mi) to the border with South Australia. The park was listed on Australia's now-defunct Register of the National Estate, and lies within the traditional lands of the Gunditjmara people.

Part of the route of the Great South West Walk is located within the park. The Discovery Bay Marine National Park adjoins the park to the west of Cape Bridgewater

== History ==
After being recommended as a coastal reserve in 1973 by Victoria's Land Conservation Council, the park was first included in Schedule 3 of the Victorian National Parks Act in 1979, with an area of 84.5 square kilometres (32.6 sq mi). Additional parcels of land were acquired in 1981, 1987 and 1997.

Land within the coastal park, the Lower Glenelg National Park and the Nelson Streamside Reserve was listed as a Ramsar site known as the Glenelg Estuary and Discovery Bay Ramsar Site on 28 February 2018.

== Environment ==
=== Landforms ===
Geologically the area is basalt overlain by limestone with the coastal landforms characterised by the rugged cliffs and headlands of Cape Nelson and Cape Bridgewater, dunefields, and by swamps and freshwater lakes further inland. The limestone contains mammalian fossil deposits of Pleistocene age.

=== Flora and fauna ===
Some 320 native vascular plant species have been recorded in the park. An important wetland is Long Swamp, fed by a groundwater aquifer, where declining water levels have led to encroachment by bare twig-sedge (Baumea sp.) whose seeds are a favoured food of the ground parrot. As water levels continue to decline, Woolly Tea-tree is beginning to colonise formerly sedge-dominated areas. The swamp's sedge habitat is also an important site for an endangered damselfly, the ancient greenling.

The park forms much of the Discovery Bay to Piccaninnie Ponds Important Bird Area, identified by BirdLife International as being of global significance for several bird species. Two threatened birds, the hooded plover and little tern, nest on the beaches. The ground parrot, Australasian bittern and brolga frequent the wetlands while the orange-bellied parrot, rufous bristlebird, striated fieldwren and beautiful firetail have been recorded in the dunes and shrublands. Threatened fish species, include the Yarra pygmy perch and dwarf galaxias. Mammals found in the park include the long-nosed potoroo, heath mouse and swamp antechinus. There are Australian fur seal colonies on rock platforms at Capes Nelson and Bridgewater.

== See also ==
- Protected areas of Victoria
