= Lestoidea =

Scientific classification
- Kingdom: Animalia
- Phylum: Arthropoda
- Clade: Pancrustacea
- Class: Insecta
- Order: Odonata
- Suborder: Zygoptera
- Family: Lestoideidae
- Subfamily: Lestoideinae; Munz, 1919
- Genus: Lestoidea; Tillyard, 1913

Genus of damselflies

Lestoidea is a genus of damselflies in the family Lestoideidae. It is the only genus in the subfamily Lestoideinae. Its species are commonly known as bluestreaks.

The genus is endemic to north-east Queensland, Australia, where its species inhabit rainforest streams.

Species of Lestoidea are medium-sized to large damselflies, dark brown to black in colour, with dull orange, greenish or bluish markings. Most species have a pale spot at the base of each antenna, although this is absent in Lestoidea lewisiana.

== Taxonomic history ==
In 1913, Tillyard described the genus Lestoidea based on Lestoidea conjuncta, regarding it as intermediate between the damselfly groups then recognised as Lestes and Protoneura.

In 1919, Munz established the subfamily under the name Lestoidinae. The spelling Lestoideinae was subsequently adopted, including by van Tol in 1995. The subfamily includes only the genus Lestoidea.

For many years Lestoidea was considered to contain only a single species. In 1967, Watson described a second species, Lestoidea barbarae, from north-east Queensland.

In 1996, Günther Theischinger revised the genus and recognised four distinct species, describing Lestoidea brevicauda and Lestoidea lewisiana.

== Description ==
Species of Lestoidea inhabit rainforest streams in north-east Queensland, with some species restricted to particular mountain ranges or upland regions.

The genus is distinguished by the elongated pterostigma and by reduced wing venation near the base of the wing. Larvae are relatively flat-bodied and possess sac-like caudal gills.

== Species ==
The genus Lestoidea has four species:

- Lestoidea barbarae Watson, 1967 – large bluestreak
- Lestoidea brevicauda Theischinger, 1996 – short-tipped bluestreak
- Lestoidea conjuncta Tillyard, 1913 – common bluestreak
- Lestoidea lewisiana Theischinger, 1996 – Mount Lewis bluestreak

== Etymology ==
The genus name Lestoidea is derived from Lestes and the Greek suffix -οειδής (oeidēs, "resembling" or "having the form of"), indicating resemblance to that genus.

== See also ==
- List of Odonata species of Australia
