= Discovery Bay Marine National Park =

Protected area in Victoria, Australia

- IUCN category II (national park)
- Location within Victoria
- Location: Victoria
- Nearest city: Portland
- Coordinates: 38°21′S 141°22′E
- Area: 27.7 km^{2} (10.7 sq mi)
- Established: 16 November 2002
- Governing body: Parks Victoria
- Website: Official website

Ramsar Wetland
- Official name: Glenelg Estuary and Discovery Bay Ramsar Site
- Designated: 28 February 2018
- Reference no.: 2344

The Discovery Bay Marine National Park is a protected marine national park located in the Western District of Victoria, Australia The 2,770-hectare (6,800-acre) marine park is located near Portland, and extends along 6 kilometres (3.7 mi) of coastline on the western side of Cape Bridgewater, from Cape Duquesne to Blacks Beach, and offshore 3 nautical miles (5.6 km; 3.5 mi) to the limit of Victorian waters.

The Discovery Bay Coastal Park protects the adjacent coastline.

== See also ==
- Protected areas of Victoria
- List of national parks of Australia
