= Ancient Roman pottery =

Produced within the Roman Republic and Roman Empire

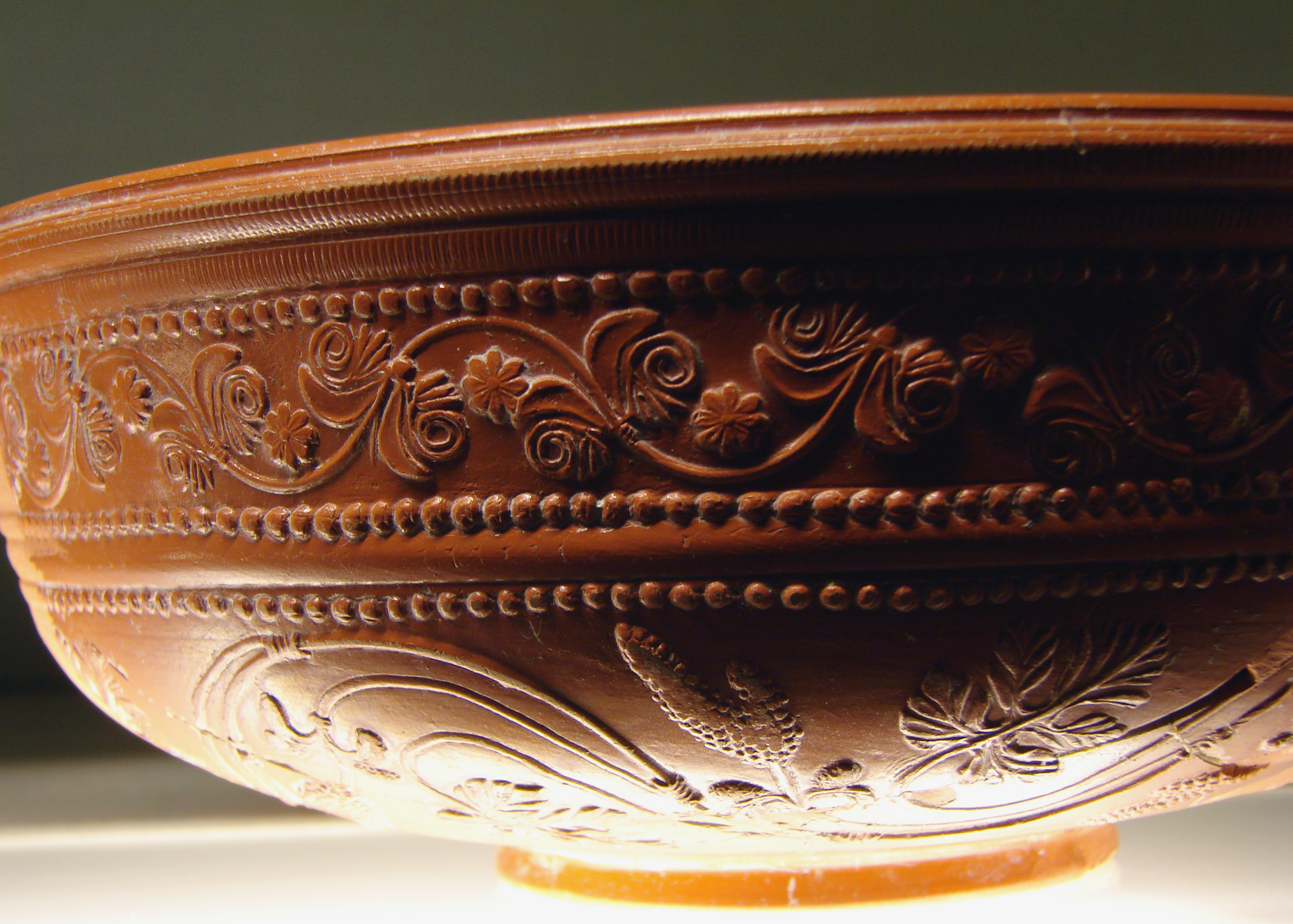
Decorated terra sigillata bowl from Gaul (Metz in France)

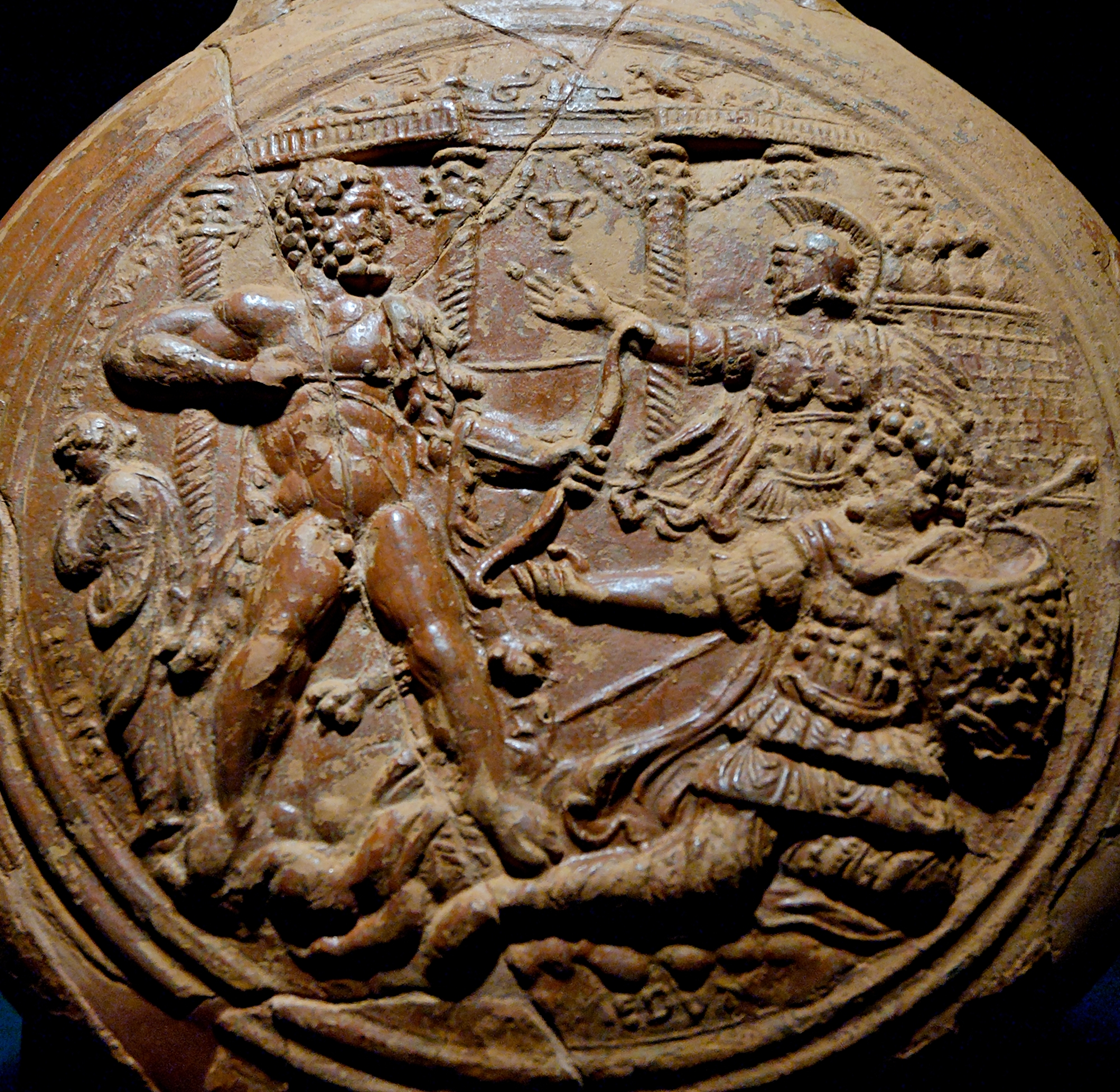
Unusually ambitious terra sigillata flask from Southern Gaul around 100 AD. Heracles is killing Laomedon.

Pottery was produced in enormous quantities in ancient Rome, mostly for utilitarian purposes. It is found all over the former Roman Empire and beyond. Monte Testaccio is a huge waste mound in Rome made almost entirely of broken amphorae used for transporting and storing liquids and other products – in this case probably mostly Spanish olive oil, which was landed nearby, and was the main fuel for lighting, as well as its use in the kitchen and washing in the baths.

It is usual to divide Roman domestic pottery broadly into coarse wares and fine wares, the former being the everyday pottery jars, dishes and bowls that were used for cooking or the storage and transport of foods and other goods, and in some cases also as tableware, and which were often made and bought locally. Fine wares were serving vessels or tableware used for more formal dining, and are usually of more decorative and elegant appearance. Some of the most important of these were made at specialised pottery workshops, and were often traded over substantial distances, not only within, but also between, different provinces of the Roman Empire. For example, dozens of different types of British coarse and fine wares were produced locally, yet many other classes of pottery were also imported from elsewhere in the Empire. The manufacture of fine wares such as terra sigillata took place in large workshop complexes that were organised along industrial lines and produced highly standardised products that lend themselves well to precise and systematic classification.

There is no direct Roman equivalent to the artistically central vase-painting of ancient Greece, and few objects of outstanding artistic interest have survived, but there is a great deal of fine tableware, and very many small figures, often incorporated into oil lamps or similar objects, and often with religious or erotic themes. Roman burial customs varied over time and space, so vessels deposited as grave goods, the usual source of complete ancient pottery vessels, are not always abundant, though all Roman sites produce plenty of broken potsherds. "Fine" rather than luxury pottery is the main strength of Roman pottery, unlike Roman glass, which the elite often used alongside gold or silver tableware, and which could be extremely extravagant and expensive. It is clear from the quantities found that fine pottery was used very widely in both social and geographic terms. The more expensive pottery tended to use relief decoration, usually moulded, rather than colour, and often copied shapes and decoration from the more prestigious metalwork. Especially in the Eastern Empire, local traditions continued, hybridizing with Roman styles to varying extents. From the 3rd century the quality of fine pottery steadily declined, partly because of economic and political disturbances, and because glassware was replacing pottery for drinking cups (the rich had always preferred silver in any case).

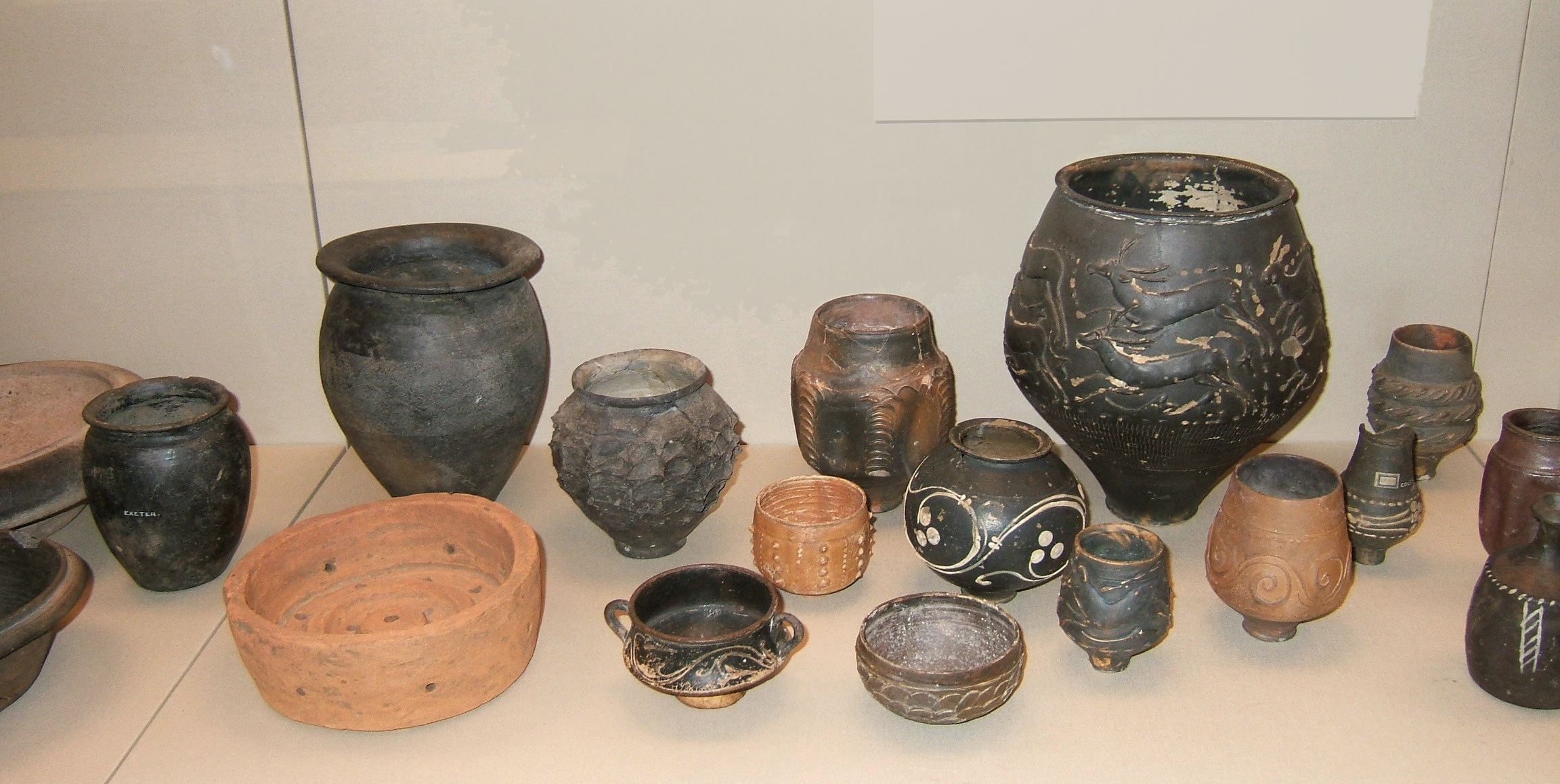
A selection of pottery found in Roman Britain. The assemblage includes Black-burnished ware jars, a Rusticated Ware jar, a Central Gaulish Colour-Coated Ware beaker, Trier Black-slipped Ware with white trailed decoration, Nene Valley Colour Coated Ware, a coarse ware cheese press and other fine wares.

Fired clay or terracotta was also widely employed in the Roman period for architectural purposes, as structural bricks and tiles, and occasionally as architectural decoration, and for the manufacture of small statuettes and lamps. These are not normally classified under the heading 'pottery' by archaeologists, but the terracottas and lamps will be included in this article. Pottery is a key material in the dating and interpretation of archaeological sites from the Neolithic period onwards, and has been minutely studied by archaeologists for generations.

Over the centuries the different manufacturing techniques have changed, from initial pottery modelled by hand, to the introduction of the tome and later the use of molds. The decorations as well as the backing techniques have been also changed over the centuries, making possible to use the pottery to date the age of an archeological area. In the Roman period, ceramics were produced and used in enormous quantities, and the literature on the subject, in numerous languages, is very extensive.

== Fine wares ==
=== Terra sigillata or red-gloss wares ===
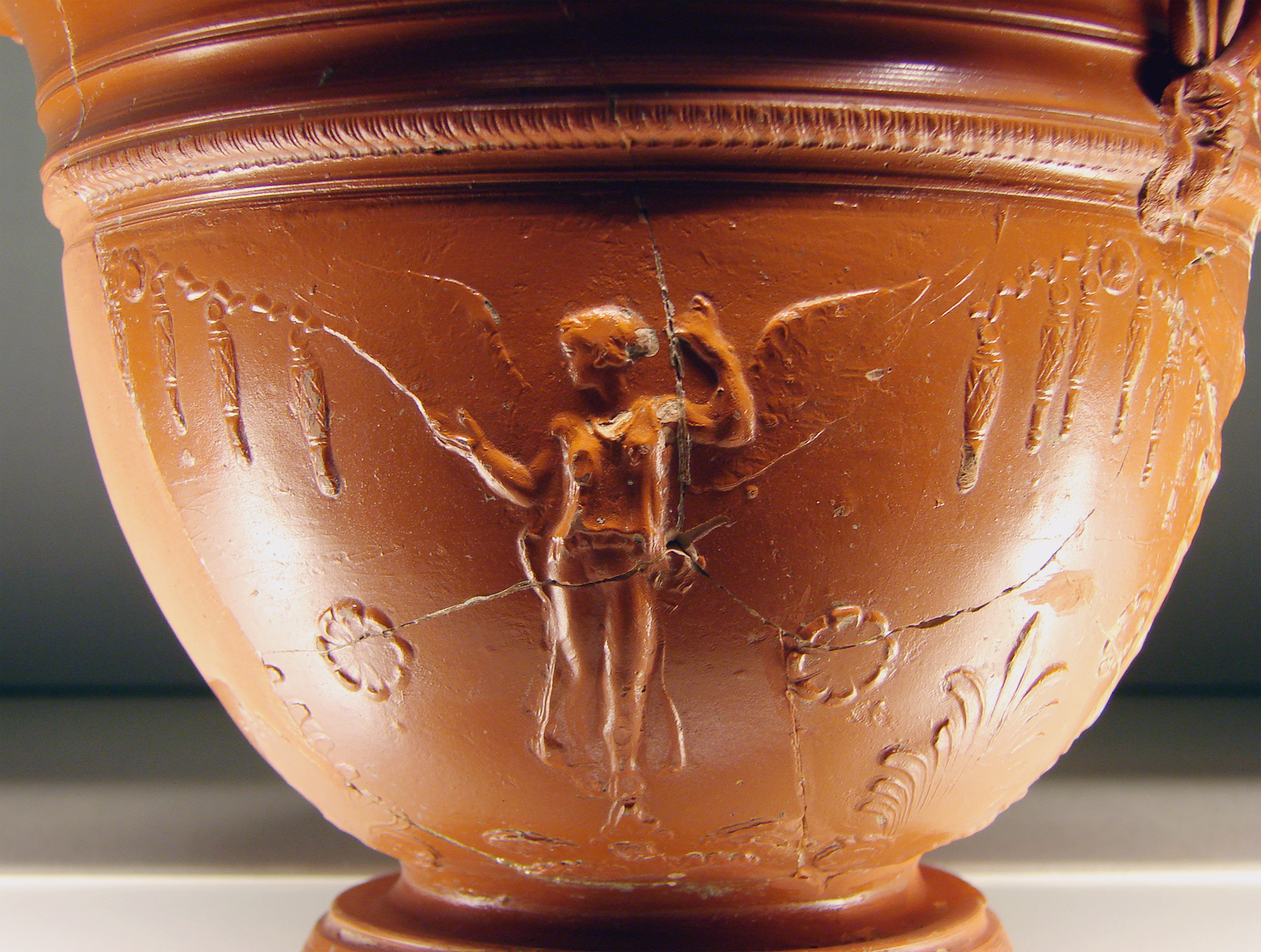
Red gloss terra sigillata ware with relief decoration. Compare the plain unglossed restored section to the left.

The designation 'fine wares' is used by archaeologists for Roman pottery intended for serving food and drink at table, as opposed to those designed for cooking and food preparation, storage, transport and other purposes. Although there were many types of fine pottery, for example drinking vessels in very delicate and thin-walled wares, and pottery finished with vitreous lead glazes, the major class is the Roman red-gloss ware of Italy and Gaul make, and widely traded, from the 1st century BC to the late 2nd century AD, and traditionally known as terra sigillata or samian ware. These vessels have fine, fairly hard and well-fired buff to pink fabrics, with a naturally glossy surface slip ranging in colour from light orange to quite a bright red. The variations in the colour and texture of both body fabric and slip, as well as the vessel-shapes and the designs on the decorated forms can enable a trained student to identify source, date and often individual workshop quite accurately. Arretine ware, made at Arezzo in Tuscany, was the pre-eminent type of fine pottery in the 1st century BC and early 1st century AD, and was succeeded by samian ware, manufactured in a number of centres in Gaul, modern France and Germany. However the definition of all these terms has varied and evolved over the many generations during which the material has been studied. Technically, red-gloss wares have much in common with earlier Greek painted pottery, but the decorated forms employ raised, relief decoration rather than painting.

African Red Slip (ARS) ware belonged to the same tradition, and continued to be made much later than Italian and Gaulish sigillata, right through to the Islamic conquest. ARS in turn influenced the production of Phocaean red slip, which is common in the Eastern Mediterranean and also appeared occasionally as far west as Southern France and Britain.

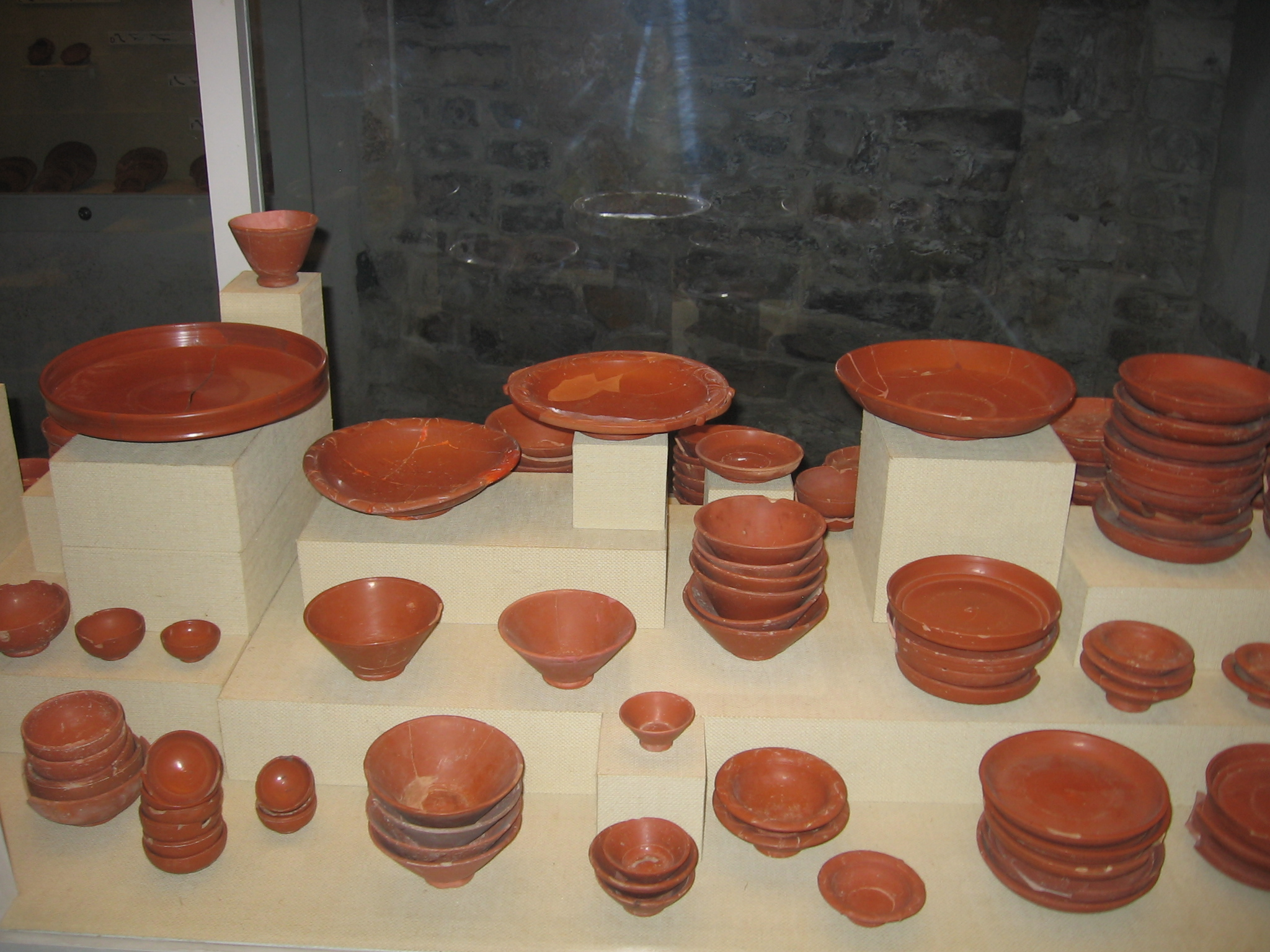
Selection of undecorated terra sigillata from La Graufesenque

The production of related types of wares existed in Asia Minor and in other eastern regions of the Empire (Eastern Sigillata wares), while the Iberian provinces also had local industries producing terra sigillata hispanica, which had some similarities with the Gaulish products.

Most of these wares were widely distributed and produced on an industrial scale (the largest kilns could fire up to 40,000 pieces at a time ), and undoubtedly using a high degree of specialisation within the workshops. The names of many potters and factory-owners are known from the potters' marks frequently applied to fine wares, and can be highly informative. Cnaius Ateius was an especially prominent producer at Arezzo, but wares with his stamps can be shown by modern analysis of their clay to have been produced in Pisa in Tuscany, and at branch factories at both Lyon and La Graufesenque in modern France. However, the interpretation of name-stamps can be more complex than it appears at first sight. Bold name-stamps visible in decorated areas advertise the name of the factory, but the names of individual artisans working within the pottery, the bowl-makers, appear on plain vessels, while the moulds for decorated bowls were also sometimes signed freehand by the mould-makers, and their signatures also sometimes appear on finished vessels. Theoretically, a decorated vessel might bear the mould-maker's name, that of the bowl-maker or finisher (for example, on the rim), and the 'brand-name' of the factory in the decoration. The use of slave labour in the Italian workshops is unproven, though some names are certainly of liberti (freedmen, that is, freed former slaves). The site of La Graufesenque in South Gaul, near Millau, has been extensively studied and excavated. Its products had an immensely wide distribution in the later 1st century AD, and sherds have been found from India to the Sudan and Scotland.

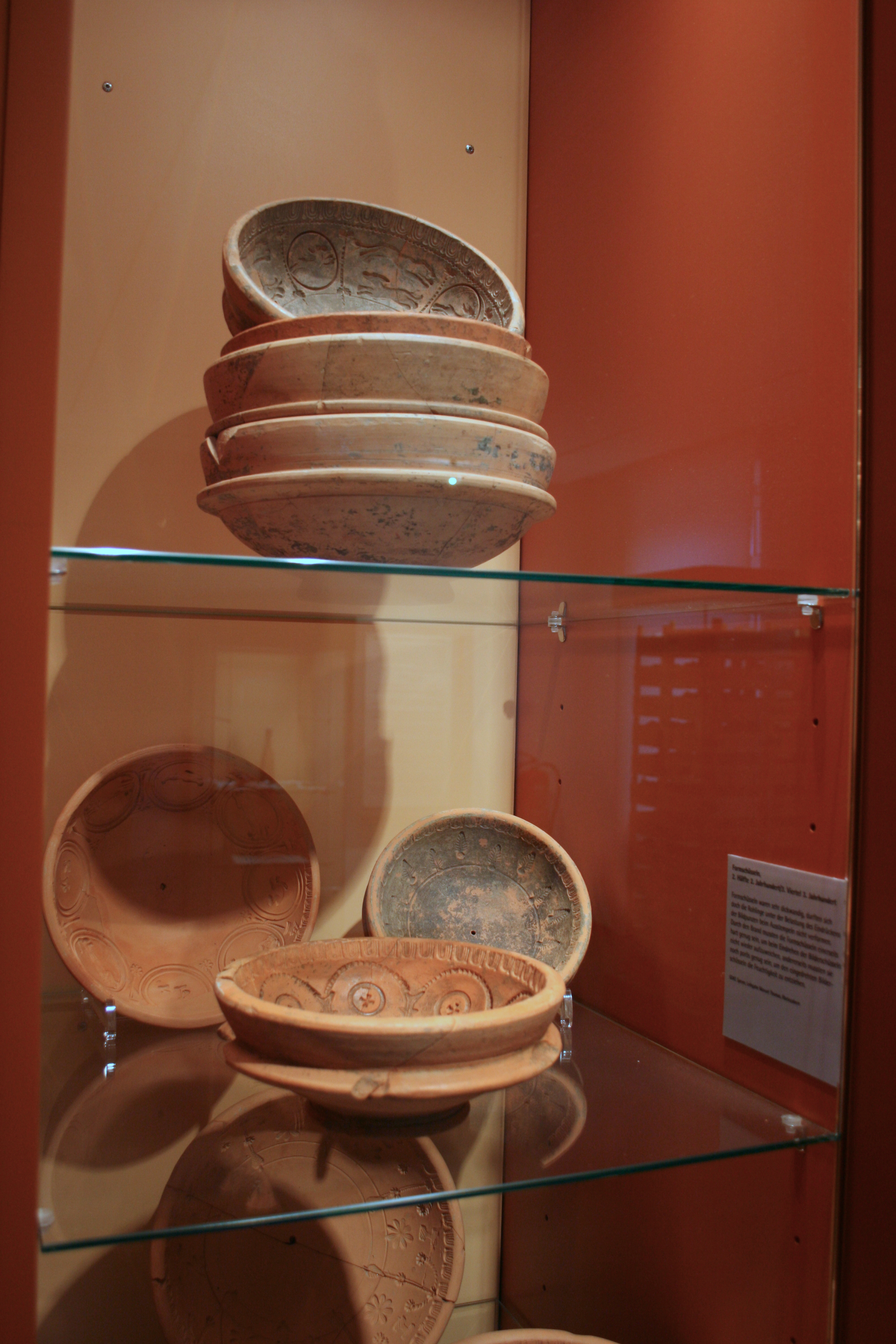
Moulds for terra sigillata bowls of form Dragendorff 37, made at the East Gaulish factory of Rheinzabern

In 1895, the German scholar Hans Dragendorff produced a classification of vessel shapes in Roman red gloss pottery that is still used (as e.g. "Drag. 27" or "Dr.27" to refer to the small biconvex-profiled cup). Other scholars added to his numbered forms, and some archaeologists working on the products of specific manufacturing sites, or the finds from important excavations, initiated their own typologies, so that there are now many other classification systems for Arretine and samian, as there are, indeed, for other classes of Roman pottery, such as the Hayes numbers for African Red Slip forms. Other numbering systems used with Italian and Gaulish sigillata include those of Déchelette, Knorr, Curle, Walters, Loeschcke, Ritterling and Ludowici, to name but a few.

The most common method of making relief decoration on the surface of an open terra sigillata vessel was to throw a pottery bowl whose interior profile corresponded with the desired form of the final vessel's exterior. The internal surface was then decorated using individual positive stamps (poinçons), usually themselves made of fired clay, or small wheels bearing repeated motifs, such as the ovolo (egg-and-tongue) design that often formed the upper border of the decoration. Details could also be added by hand with a stylus. When the decoration was complete in intaglio on the interior, the mould was dried and fired in the usual way, and was subsequently used for shaping bowls. As the bowl dried, it shrank sufficiently to remove it from the mould, after which the finishing processes were carried out, such as the shaping or addition of a foot-ring and the finishing of the rim. The details varied according to the form. The completed bowl could then be slipped, dried again, and fired. Closed forms, such as jugs and jars, were seldom decorated in relief using moulds, though some vessels of this type were made at La Graufesenque by making the upper and lower parts of the vessel separately in moulds and joining them at the point of widest diameter. Relief-decoration of tall vases or jars was usually achieved by using moulded appliqué motifs (sprigs) and/or barbotine decoration (slip-trailing). The latter technique was particularly popular at the East Gaulish workshops of Rheinzabern, and was also widely used on other pottery types.

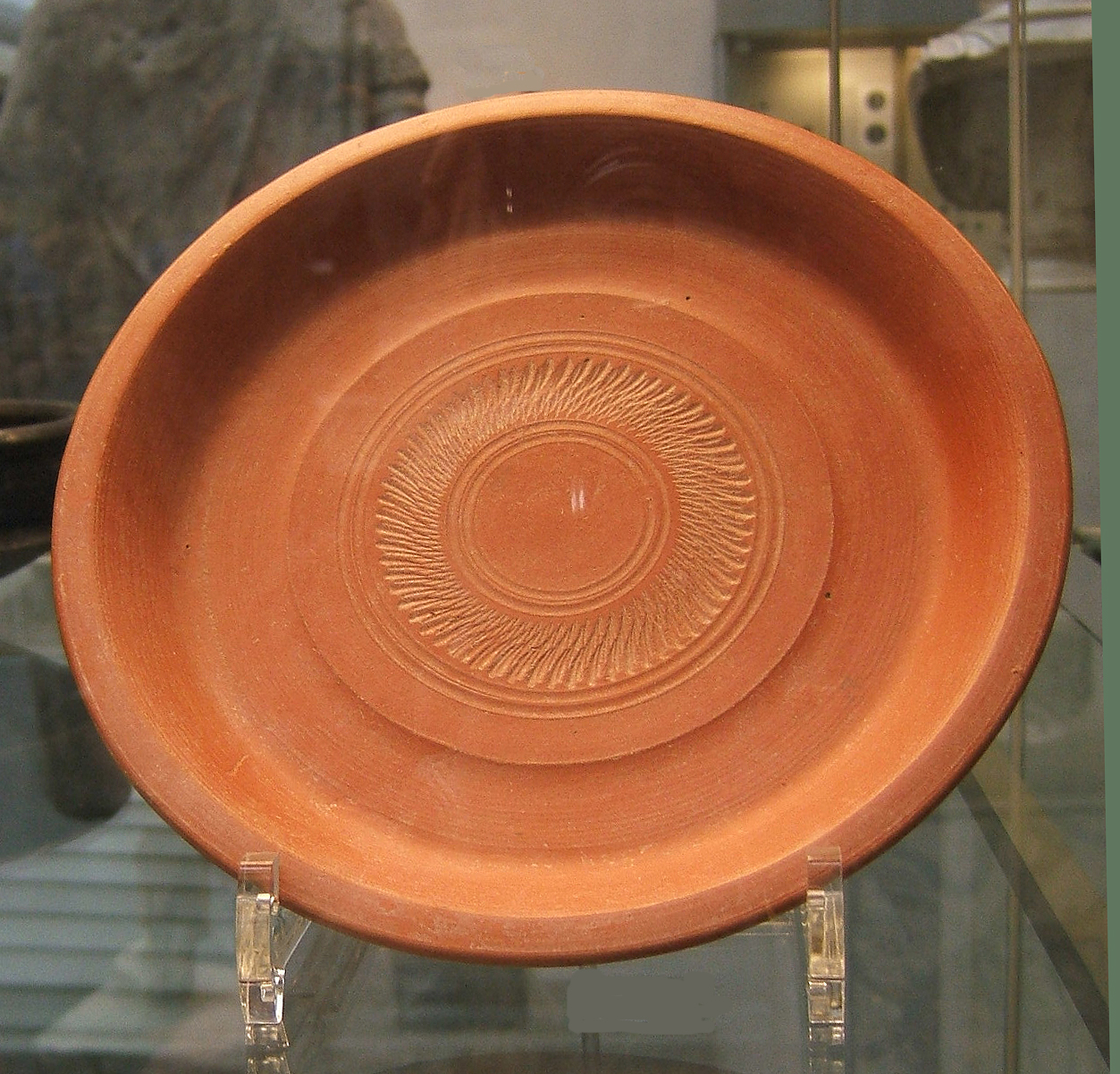
A typical plain African Red Slip dish with simple rouletted decoration. 4th century AD.

Plain sigillata table vessels, which included large platters, shallow dishes in several sizes, slightly deeper bowls, and small cups, were made on the wheel using a range of templates to create very precise profiles. The sizes were also standardised, which would have facilitated the firing, storage and transport of the huge numbers that were made. The evolution in forms matches in many respects that seen in silver and glass table vessels of the same periods, and the precise forms can sometimes be closely dated. The forms archaeologically classified as 'plain' do sometimes bear decoration of a simple kind, often in the form of a ring of rouletting within the flat interior base of a dish. Plain wares also often bear name-stamps.

ARS (African Red Slip) ware was the most widely distributed representative of the sigillata tradition in the late-Roman period. (Occasional imports of ARS have been found as far afield as Britain in the 5th–6th centuries. It was manufactured in the province of Africa Proconsularis (approximately modern Tunisia), and similar forms and fabrics were made for more local distribution in Egypt, which had its own very active and diverse ceramic traditions in the Roman period. A wide range of bowls, dishes and flagons were made in ARS, but the technique of making entire relief-decorated vessels in moulds was discontinued. Instead, appliqué motifs were frequently used where decoration in relief was required, separately made and applied to the vessel before drying and firing. Stamped motifs were also a favoured form of decoration, and in the later centuries, Christian subjects and symbols often appear.

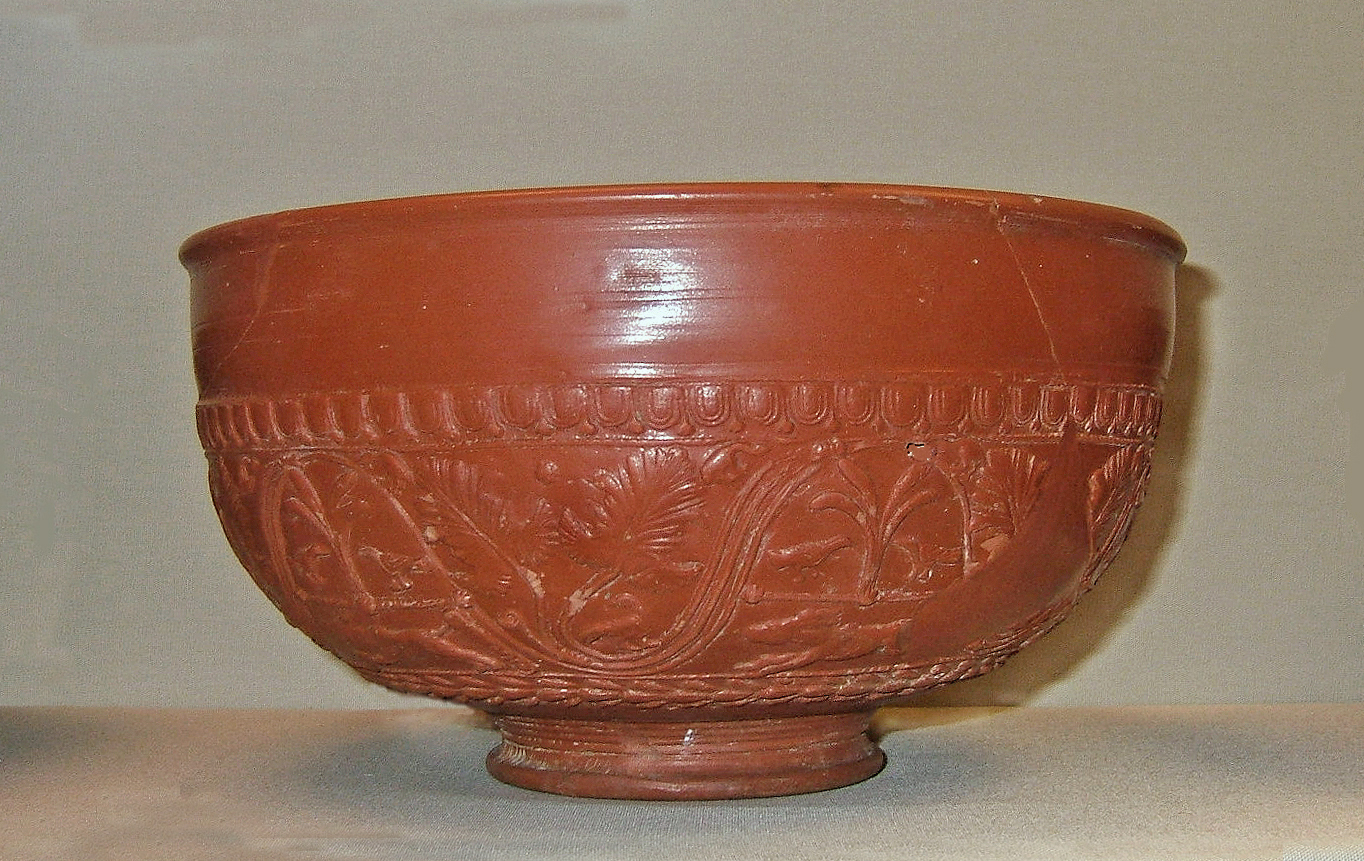
A South Gaulish samian bowl of form Dr.37. Late 1st century AD.

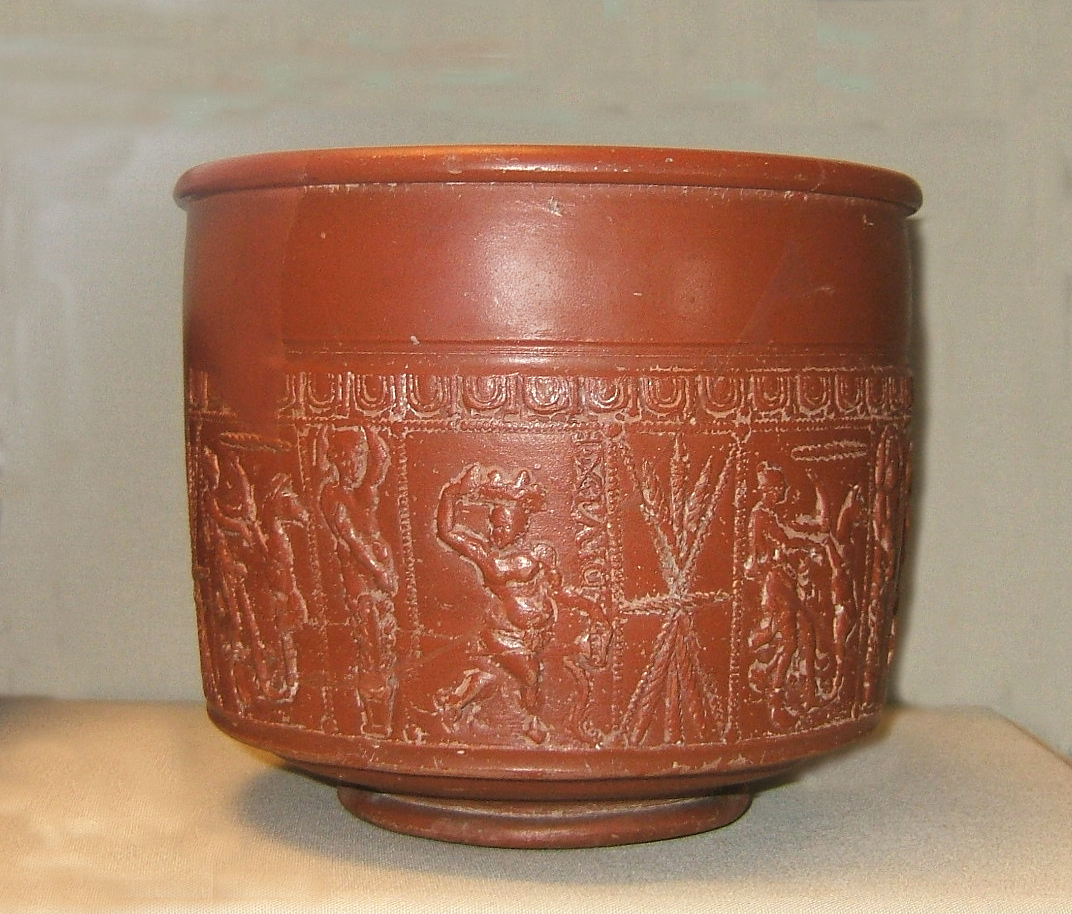
Central Gaulish samian vessel, Dr.30, with the name-stamp of Divixtus. Late 2nd century AD.

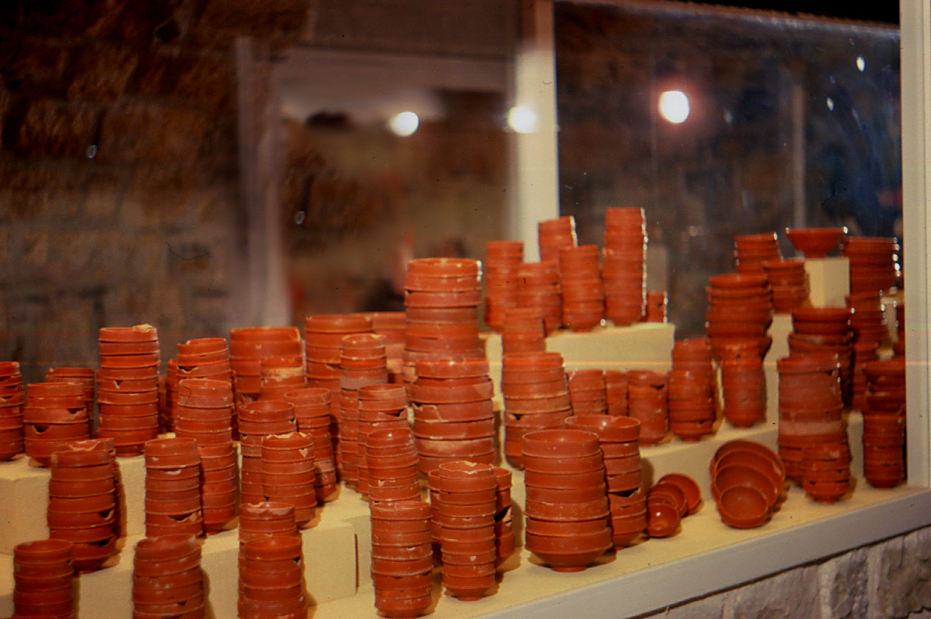
Display of South Gaulish samian plain vessels, illustrating standardisation of size

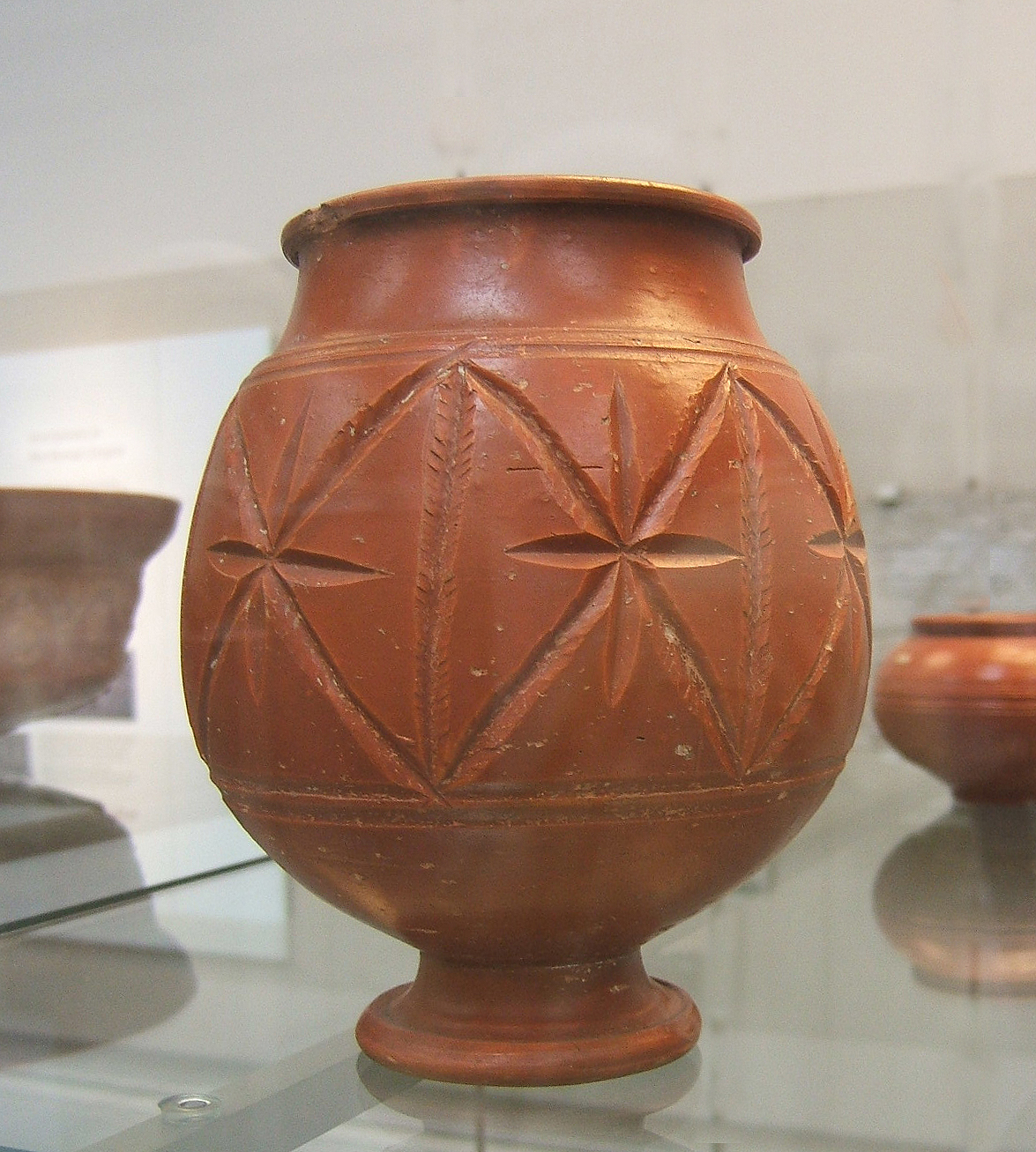
Central Gaulish samian vessel with 'cut-glass' decoration

=== Other fine wares ===
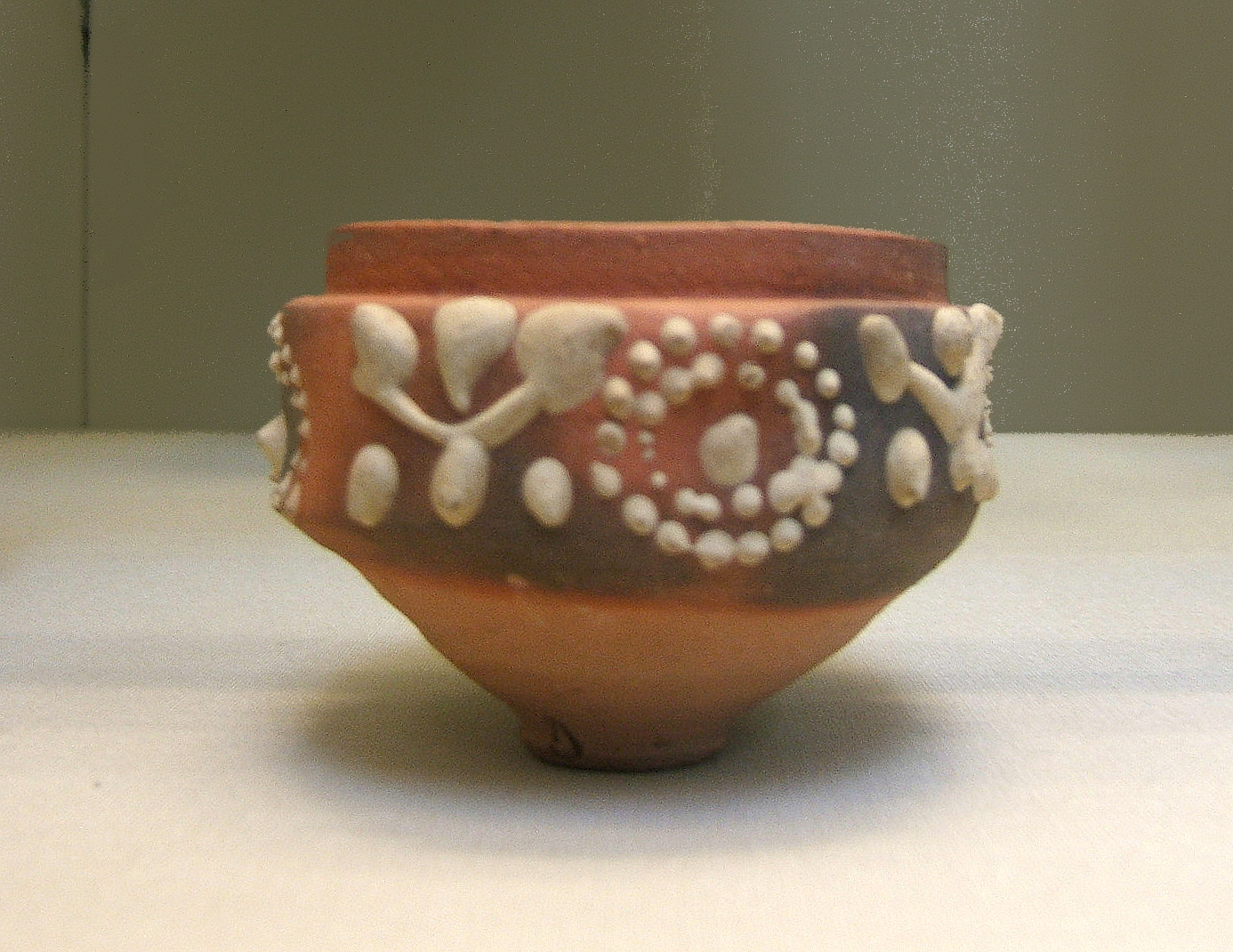
A cup, 65 mm high, made at Aswan, Egypt, in the 1st–2nd century AD, and decorated with barbotine patterns

Some of the shapes of Arretine plain wares were quite closely copied in the later 1st century BC and early 1st century AD in a class of pottery made in north-east Gaul and known as Gallo-Belgic ware. Many of these plates and dishes in red-slipped (terra rubra) and black-slipped (terra nigra) fabrics bear potters' stamps. Other fine, thin-walled flagons, drinking beakers, bowls and dishes were made locally in most regions of the Roman Empire, including frontier provinces such as Britain: for example, Romano-British 'colour-coated' (slipped) wares made at Colchester and in the Nene Valley belong to that classification. Several of the pots to the right of the group photograph in the lead section of this article are Nene Valley wares, including the large black beaker decorated with a lively hunting scene of hounds and hares in the barbotine technique. Many decorative techniques were used to beautify pottery tableware, including the use of coloured slips, painting, and various textured surfaces. Painted decoration did not, however, continue the Greek and Etruscan traditions as a specialised technique used for elaborate luxury tablewares, though simpler painted designs do appear on many pottery types, both coarse and fine, throughout the Empire. The dividing lines between 'fine' and 'coarse' wares, or tablewares and cooking wares, become a little blurred in the case of some of the local, provincial products, because pottery is often multi-purpose.

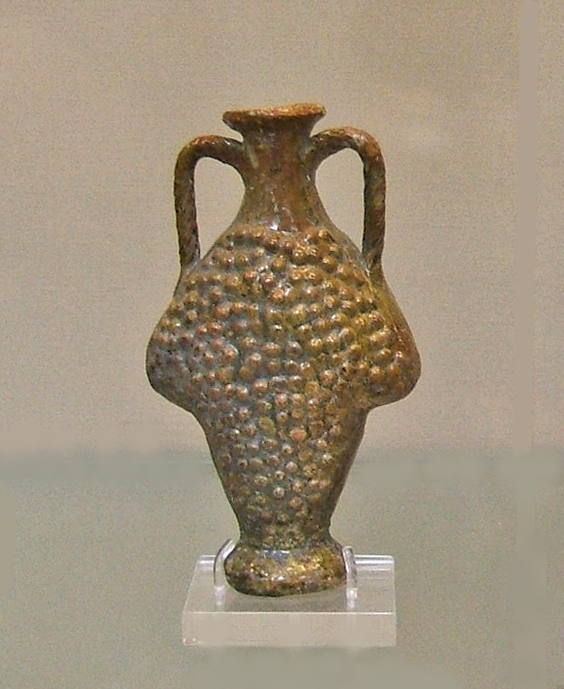
A lead-glazed flask, mould-made in the form of a bunch of grapes. From Syria. 1st century AD.

Lead-glazed pottery was made in many regions of the Roman Empire, including Gaul, Italy and the eastern provinces. This type of vitreous glaze was most often used for small, decorative items of tableware, including mould-made cups with relief decoration, lamps and zoomorphic containers. The glazes vary in colour from amber to brown and many shades of green.

Tableware made of Egyptian faience, glazed in vivid blue, turquoise or green, continued to be manufactured in Egypt throughout the Roman period, and the shapes of some of these faience vessels in the 1st century BC and 1st century AD were directly influenced by Arretine ware. Very elaborate, decorated polychrome faience vessels were also produced. Egyptian faience, frit or 'glazed composition', as it is often termed by Egyptologists, has rather more in common technically with glass manufacture than with earthenware, since it is a non-clay ceramic material.

The dividing line between pottery vessels and terracotta figurines is another that is not always sharp, since certain types of small container, such as oil-pourers, were sometimes moulded in representational forms.

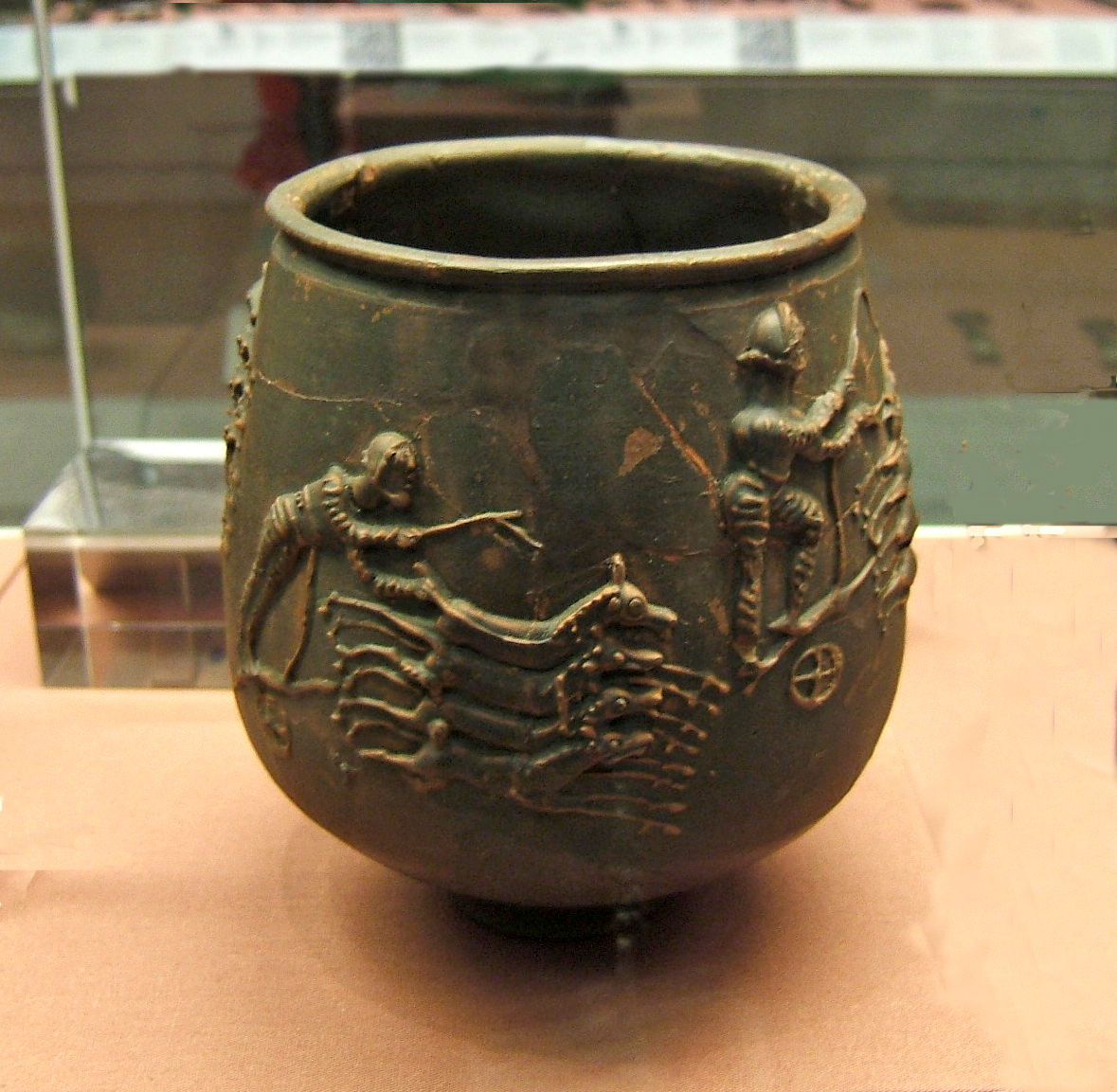
Romano-British beaker with barbotine decoration depicting chariot-racing

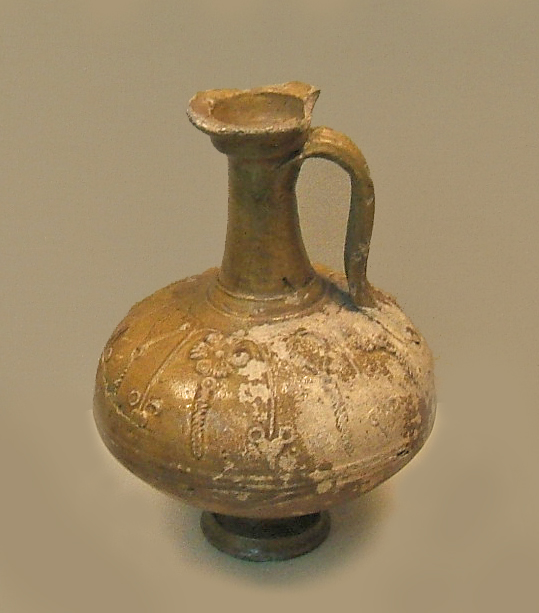
Central Gaulish relief-decorated lead-glazed flagon. 1st century AD.

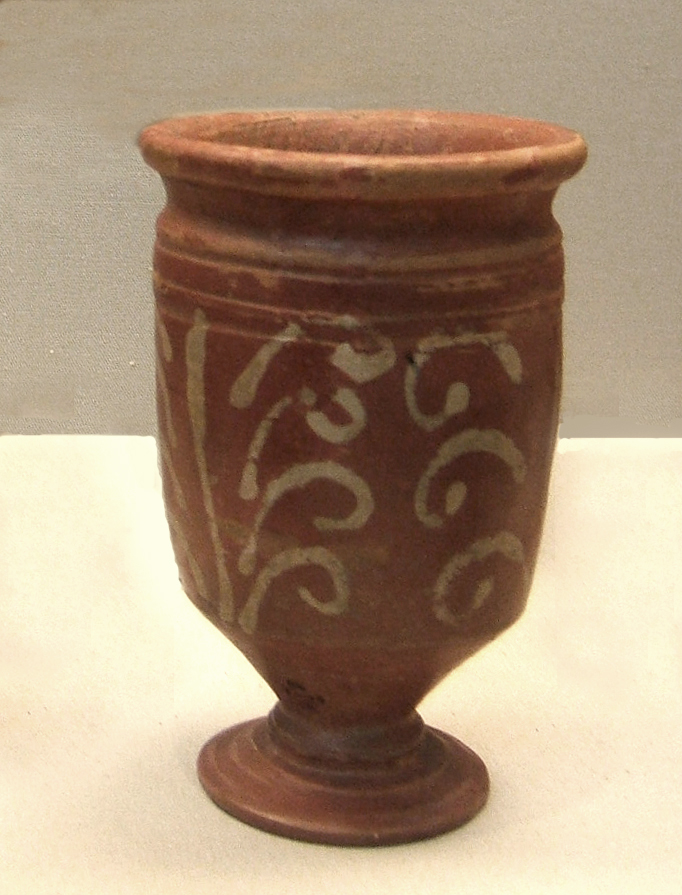
A late-Roman painted beaker made in Britain

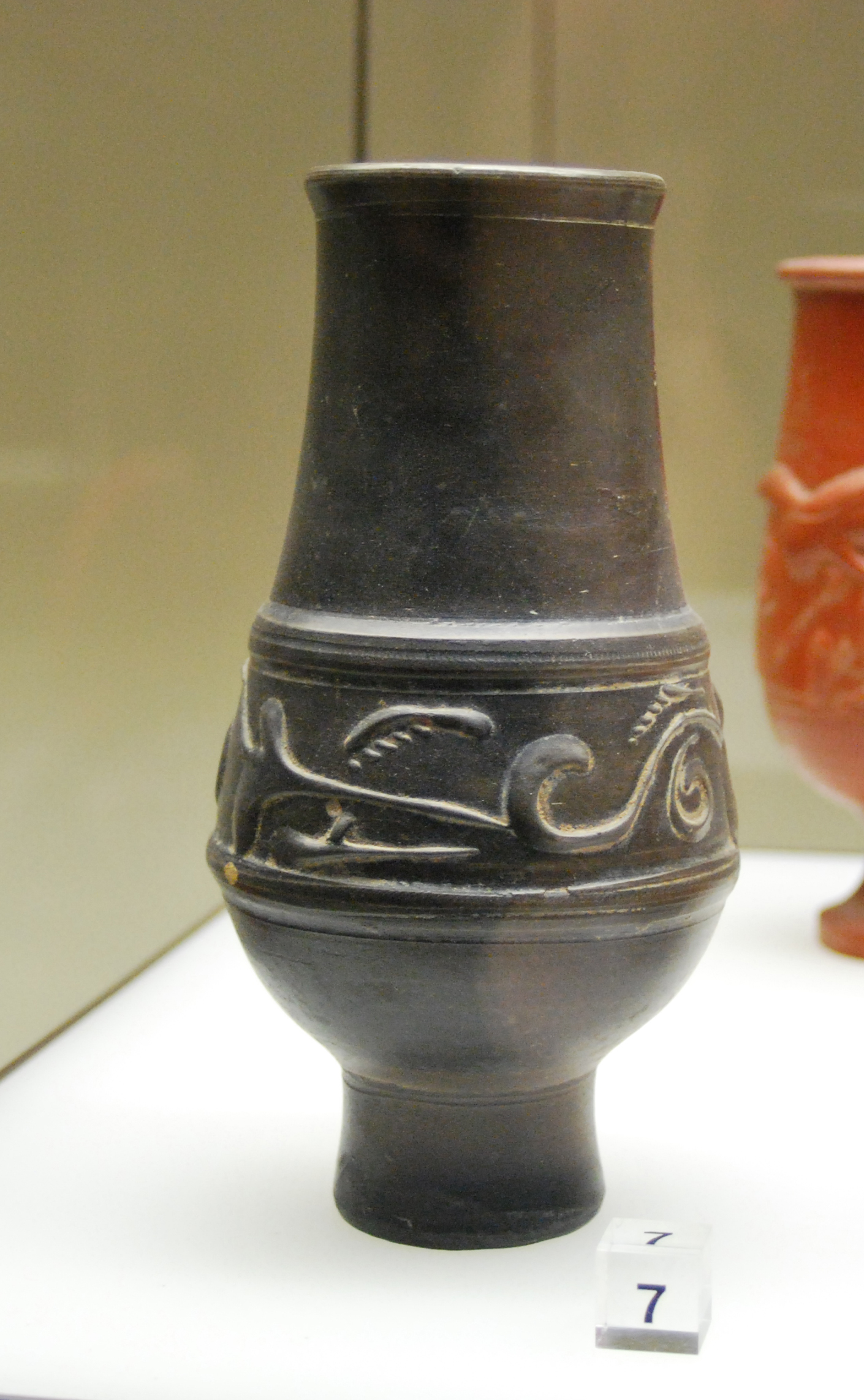
Terra nigra relief-decorated vase from Cologne

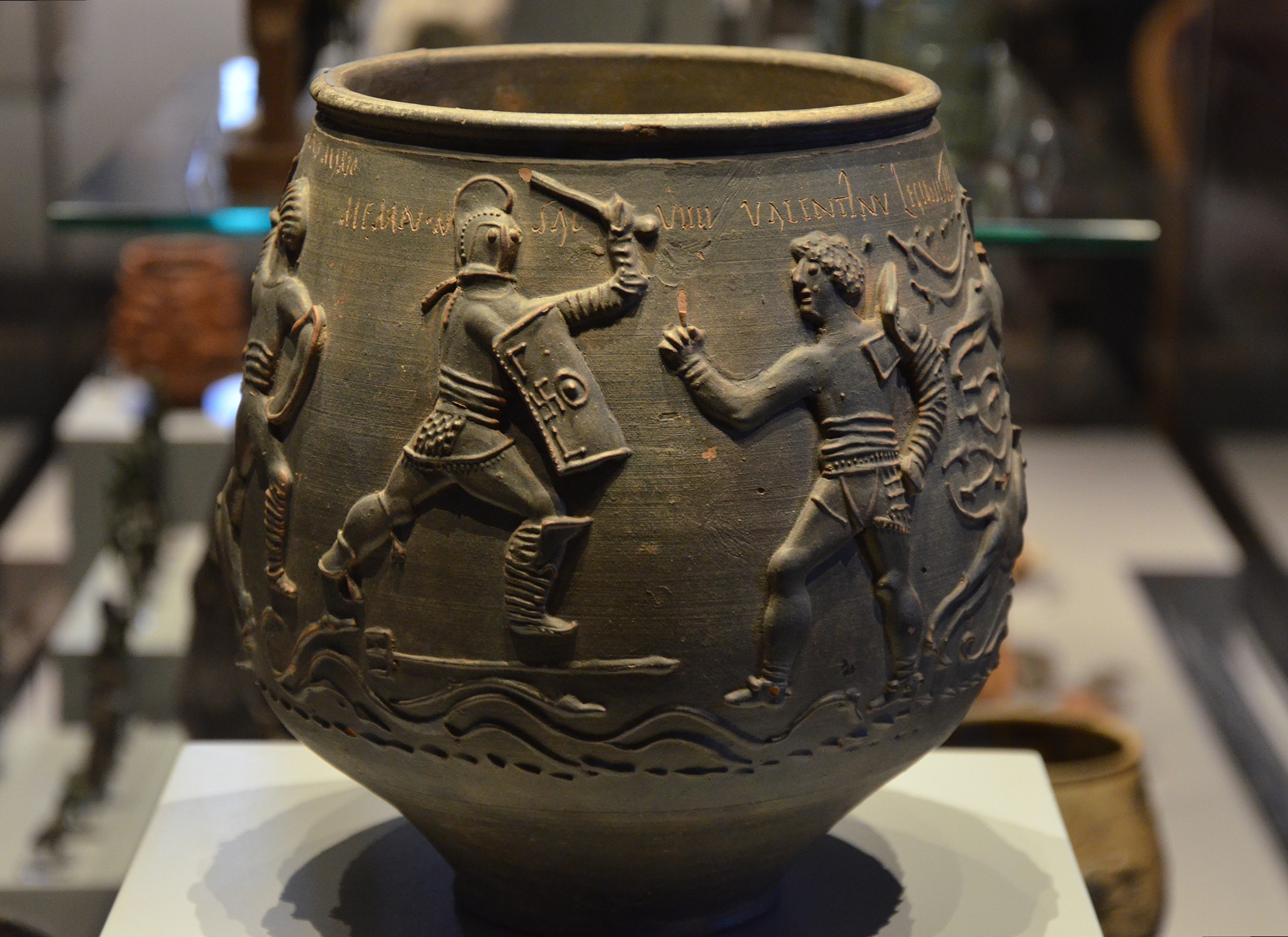
Colchester Vase (c. 175)

== Coarse wares ==
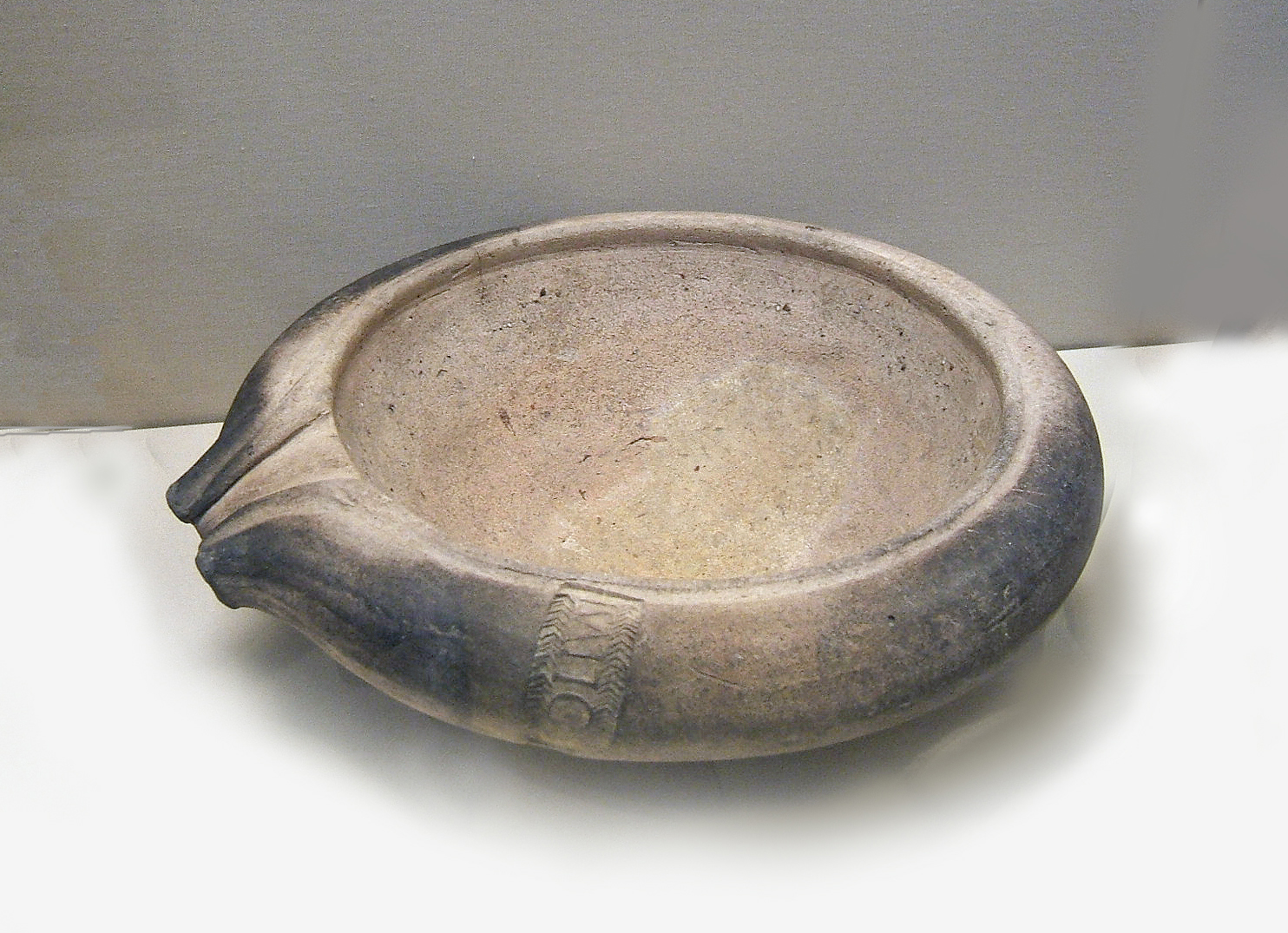
Romano-British mortarium, with the name of the manufacturer, Sollus, stamped on the rim. The gritted interior of the bowl has been worn almost smooth with use.

=== Cooking pots ===
Pottery was essential for cooking food in antiquity. Although metal utensils made of bronze or iron were widely available in the Roman period, simple, functional earthenware bowls, pans, casseroles and jars were an inexpensive and standard part of the equipment of every kitchen. From Britain to Egypt, from Spain to Syria, over the length and breadth of a vast Empire, local pre-Roman pottery traditions in simple cooking wares often continued without major changes for centuries. Roman cooking pots therefore have to be studied on a regional basis. As well as the ordinary bowls and pans used for cooking, ceramic utensils were made for many specialised uses, such as the small cheese-press illustrated to the left of the group photograph of Roman pottery from Britain above. The two black jars to the left behind the cheese-press in the same photograph are examples of Romano-British black-burnished ware, first made in south-west England in the late Iron Age, before the Roman conquest: this ware continued to be popular throughout the Roman period, and was made in greater quantities, and marketed more widely, under Roman influence. Other wares made in Roman Britain were Crambeck Ware, Huntcliff ware, and Nene Valley Colour Coated Ware, which was often decorated.

=== Mortaria ===
However, one vessel type used in food preparation was closely linked with the spread of Roman culture and Roman cuisine: the mortarium. This was a robust shallow bowl with a thick, out-curved rim that made it easy to handle, often a pouring lip, and an internal surface deliberately roughened with a coating of grit or coarse sand during manufacture. It was used with a pestle to purée or pulverise ingredients in order to prepare elaborate and carefully seasoned Roman dishes; the Roman culinary tradition made extensive use of herbs and spices. The mortarium was the Roman equivalent of the food-processor, and is a real indicator of 'romanisation'; In Britain, the first mortaria were being imported from Gaulish sources more than a generation before Britain became a Roman province in AD 43, indicating the growing influence of Roman culture in late Iron Age southern Britain, and perhaps the actual presence of immigrants from Gaul. Later, locally made mortaria produced at specialised potteries in different areas of the province were available throughout Britain, in addition to imported products: Paul Tyers discusses mortaria from no fewer than 16 different manufacturing sources, Romano-British and Continental, that have been found in Britain. Like so many other specialised Roman ceramic products, many mortaria also bore workshop or makers' stamps on their rims, and noting their chronology and distribution can help archaeologists understand trading patterns and the Roman economy.

=== Amphorae ===
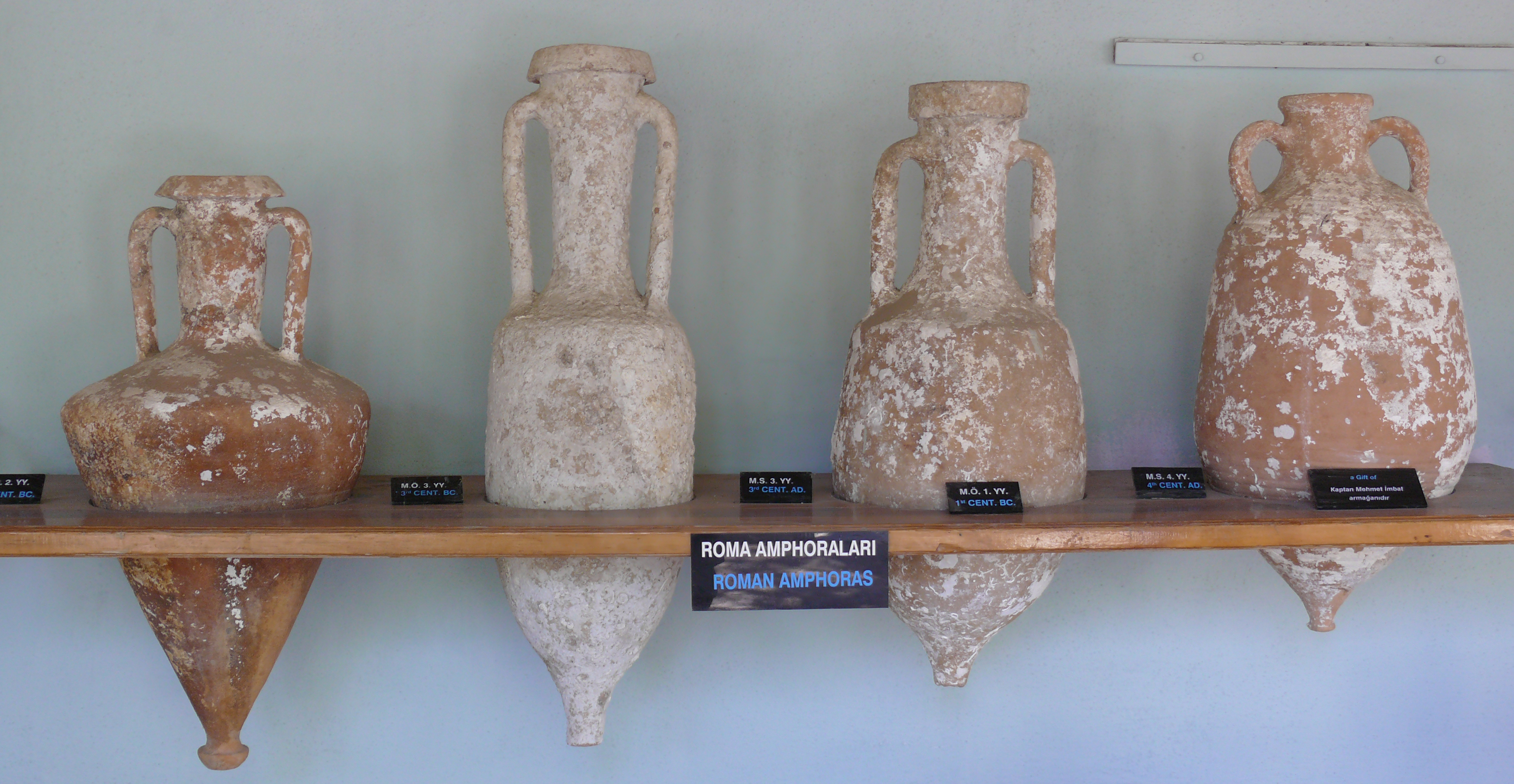
Types of Roman amphorae, which were kept in racks

==== Description and function ====
Amphorae, or amphoras, were used during Roman times to transport food on long and short distances. The content was generally liquid, olive oil or wine in most cases, but also garum, the popular fish sauce, and fruit sauce. As a container, an amphora was supposed to be strong, not too heavy, shaped in a way suitable for easy storage in the ship, and, at the same time, convenient for handling once arrived to its final destination. Usually, amphorae are two-handled terracotta containers with a globular/cylindrical body, a rim of various shapes, and a spiked or, less commonly, flat base. The spike was suited for a stable storage arrangement in the ship and it worked as a third handle in the process of emptying the container.

==== Studies on amphorae ====
The first systematic classification of amphorae types was undertaken by the German scholar Heinrich Dressel. Following the exceptional amphorae deposit uncovered in Rome in Castro Pretorio at the end of the 1800s, he collected almost 200 inscriptions from amphorae and included them in the Corpus Inscriptionum Latinarum. In his studies of the amphorae deposit he was the first one to elaborate a classification of types, the so-called Dressel table, which is still used today for many types. Subsequent studies on Roman amphorae have produced more detailed classifications which are usually named after the scholar who studied them. For the neo-Phoenician types see the work by Maña published in 1951, and the revised classification by van der Werff in 1977–1978. The Gallic amphorae have been studied by Laubenheimer in a study published in 1989, whereas the Cretan amphorae have been analyzed by Marangou-Lerat. Beltràn studied the Spanish types in 1970. Adriatic types have been studied by Lamboglia in 1955. For a general analysis of the Western Mediterranean types see Panella, and Peacock and Williams.

==== Production ====
Dressel type 1B, an early Roman amphora Key : 1 : rim - 2 : neck - 3 : handle - 4 : shoulder - 5 : belly or body - 6 : foot

Amphorae were wheel-thrown terracotta containers. During the production process the body was made first and then left to partially dry. Then, coils of clay would be added to form the neck, the rim, and the handles. Once the amphora was completed, the interior was treated with resin in order to ensure a better performance in liquid storage. The reconstruction of these stages of production is based primarily on ethnographic data coming from the study of modern amphorae production in some areas of the eastern Mediterranean. Amphorae are often marked with a variety of stamps and graffiti. The function of these stamps are related to the entire life of the vessel. Stamps, graffiti and inscriptions provided information from the production cycle to the content and the commercialisation. A stamp was usually applied to the amphora at a partially dry stage and it often indicated the name of the figlina (workshop) and/or the name of the owner of the workshop. Painted stamps, tituli picti, were executed when the amphora was completed and provided indications regarding the weight of the container and the content.

==== History ====
The first type of Roman amphora, Dressel 1, appears in central Italy in the late 2nd century BC. This type had thick walls and a characteristic red fabric. It was very heavy, though also strong. Around the middle of the 1st century BC the so-called Dressel 2–4 starts to become widely used. This type of amphora presented some advantages in being lighter and with thinner walls. It has been calculated that while a ship could accommodate approximately 4,500 Dressel 1, it was possible to fit 6,000 Dressel 2–4 in the same space. Dressel 2–4 were often produced in the same workshops used for the production of Dressel 1 which almost suddenly ceased to be used. At the same time in Cuma (southern Italy) the production of the cadii cumani type starts (Dressel 21–22). These containers were mainly used for the transportation of fruit and were used until the middle imperial times. At the same time, in central Italy, the so-called Spello amphorae, small containers, were produced for the transportation of wine. On the Adriatic coast the older types were replaced by the Lamboglia 2 type, a wine amphora commonly produced between the end of the 2nd and the 1st century BC. This type develops later into the Dressel 6A which becomes dominant during Augustan times.

In the Gallic provinces the first examples of Roman amphorae were local imitations of pre-existent types such as Dressel 1, Dressel 2–4, Pascual 1, and Haltern 70. The more typical Gallic production begins within the ceramic ateliers in Marseille during the late Augustan times. The type Oberaden 74 was produced to such an extent that it influenced the production of some Italic types. Spanish amphorae became particularly popular thanks to a flourishing production phase in the late Republican times. The Hispania Baetica and Hispania Tarraconensis regions (south-western and eastern Spain) were the main production areas between the 2nd and the 1st century BC thanks to the land distribution to the veterans and the founding of new colonies. The Spanish amphorae were widely spread in the Mediterranean during the early imperial times. The most common types were all produced in the Baetica and among these there was the Dressel 20, typical olive oil container, the Dressel 7–13, for garum, and the Haltern 70, for the defrutum, fruit sauce. In the Tarraconensis region the Pascual 1 was the most common type, a wine amphora shaped onto the Dressel 1, and imitations of Dressel 2–4.

North-African production was based on ancient tradition which could be traced back to the Phoenician colony of Carthage. Phoenician amphorae had characteristic small handles attached directly onto the upper body. This feature becomes the distinctive mark of late-Republican/early imperial productions which are then called neo-Phoenician. The types produced in Tripolitania and Northern Tunisia are the Maña C1 and C2, later renamed van Der Werff 1, 2, and 3. In the Aegean area the types from the island of Rhodes were quite popular starting from the 3rd century BC thanks to the local wine production which flourished for long time. This types developed into the Camulodunum 184, an amphora used for the transportation of the Rhodian wine all over the empire. Imitations of the Dressel 2–4 were produced in the island of Cos for the transportation of wine from the 4th BC until the middle imperial times. Cretan containers were also popular for the transportation of wine and can be found in the Mediterranean from the Augustan times until the 3rd century AD. During the late empire north-African types dominated the amphorae production. The so-called African I and II were widely used from the 2nd until the late 4th century AD. Other types from the eastern Mediterranean (Gaza), such as the so-called Late Roman 4, became very popular between the 4th and the 7th century AD, while Italic productions ceased to exist.

== Other ceramics ==
=== Lamps ===
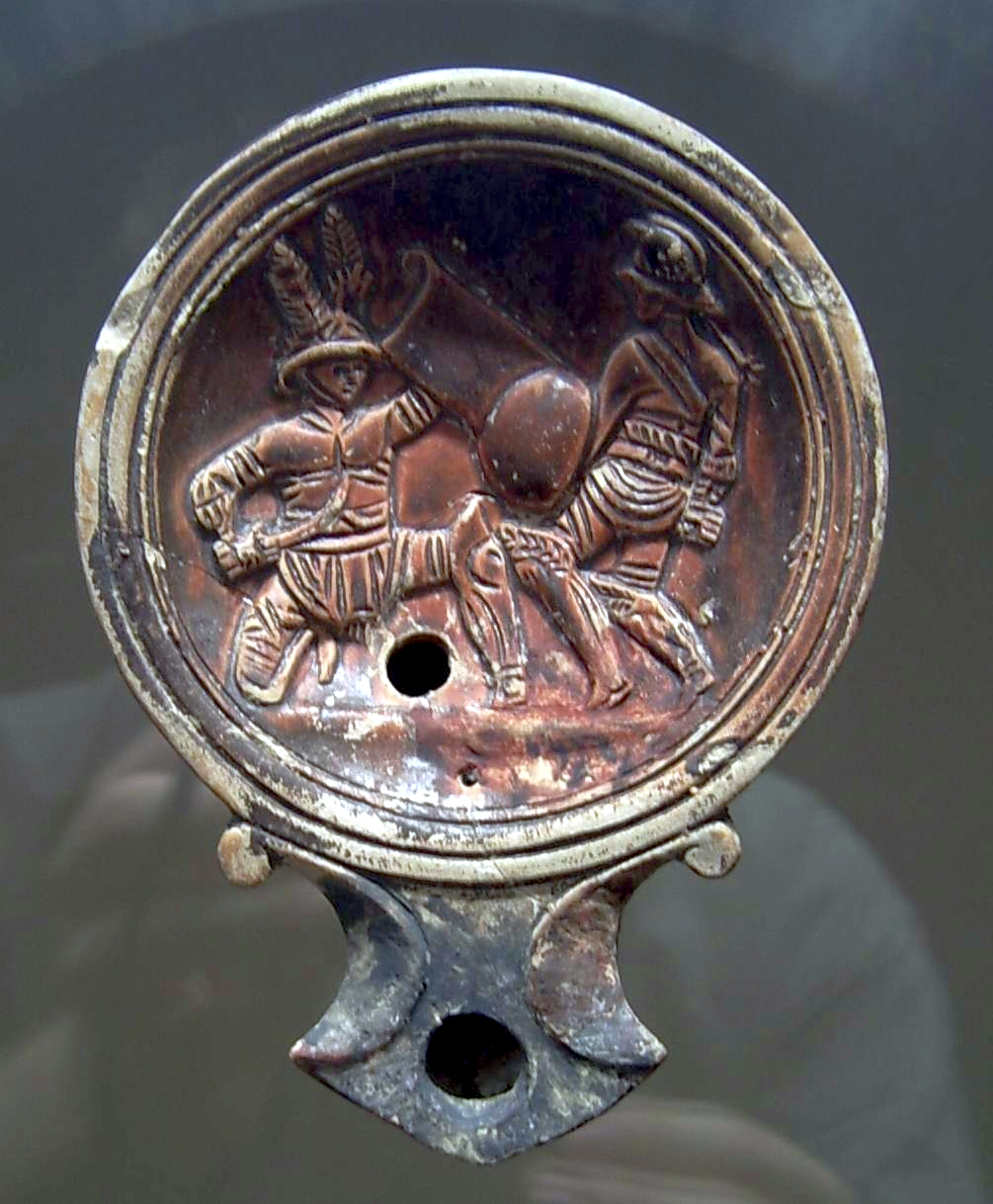
Gladiators on an oil lamp

Artificial lighting was commonplace in the Roman world. Candles made from beeswax or tallow were used, but seldom survive archaeologically. Lamps fueled with olive oil and other vegetable oils survive in great numbers, however, and have been studied in minute detail. Some Roman lamps were made of metal, and could be of highly elaborate forms incorporating statuettes and multiple nozzles, but fired clay was the most usual material, and the majority of small, probably inexpensive, clay lamps had a single nozzle for one wick, and therefore one flame.

Most of these clay lamps were shaped using moulds in workshops that turned out large numbers of standardised products. Some of the most popular forms incorporated a central discus, a circular area usually around 4–6 cm. in diameter, that incorporated the filling-hole and could be ornamented with pictorial motifs in low relief. The range of decoration included pagan deities, myths and legends, genre scenes from everyday life, animals, hunting, public entertainments such as gladiatorial combat and chariot-racing, erotic encounters, and in late-Roman times, some Christian symbolism: in short, the full range of subjects that occur in the Roman decorative arts (Jewish lamps with symbols such as the menorah are also found).

Types and decoration initiated at the centre of Empire, in Italy, were often imitated in products made in workshops located in other provinces. Lamps could be directly copied by the process known as surmoulage, using an existing lamp as the archetype for producing the mould, rather than creating a hand-modelled clay archetype.

The highly organised manufacturing methods, usually using plaster (gypsum) moulds, the volume of production, and the trading and wide distribution all echo in some respects the production of red-gloss wares such as Arretine and samian, as does the existence of name-stamps on some of the lamps. Makers' or workshop names were normally placed on the underside of the lamp, and are common on the usually undecorated lamps known as Firmalampen ('factory lamps'), a type which was popular in the military zones of the north-west Roman provinces during the 2nd century AD. One well-known name is that of Fortis, and his products were evidently copied outside his own workshop in Italy – or perhaps Fortis had his own branch factories in the provinces. The Gaulish Firmalampe in the adjacent picture, found in London, is stamped on the base with the name of the maker Atimetus.

In addition to the many basic lamp-shapes, which consisted of a rounded or ovoid body, with one or more projecting nozzles, and sometimes a handle, terracotta lamps were also made in a variety of much more fanciful forms, moulded to represent animals, grotesque heads, feet and many other shapes. These are known traditionally as plastic lamps ('plastic' meaning 'modelled or moulded').

The close dating and distribution information that can be obtained from the detailed study of forms, makers' marks and decoration makes Roman lamps important and useful finds on archaeological sites. They are not found in quite as great profusion on Roman sites in Britain as on sites elsewhere in the Empire, including Gaul, quite possibly because imported olive oil would probably have been more expensive in Britannia.

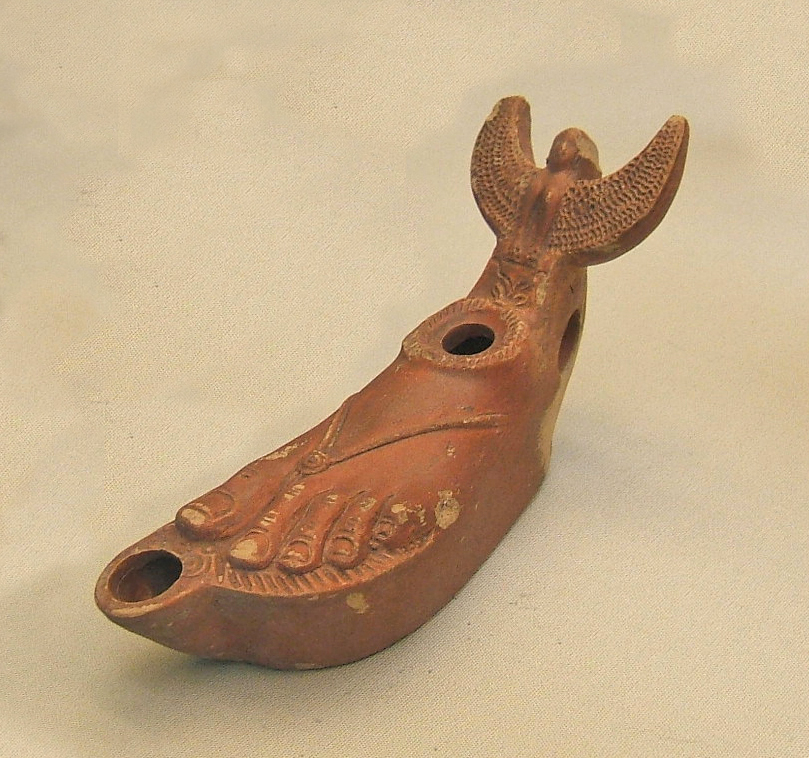
Italian lamp in the shape of a foot, with a siren or sphinx handle

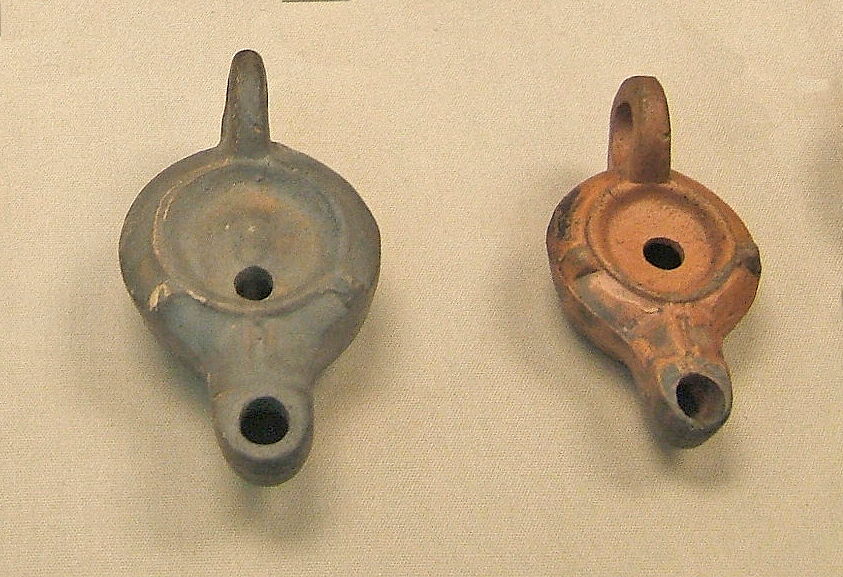
Two Roman Firmalampen. The one on the left was made in Colchester, and that on the right in Gaul. Both were found in Britain.

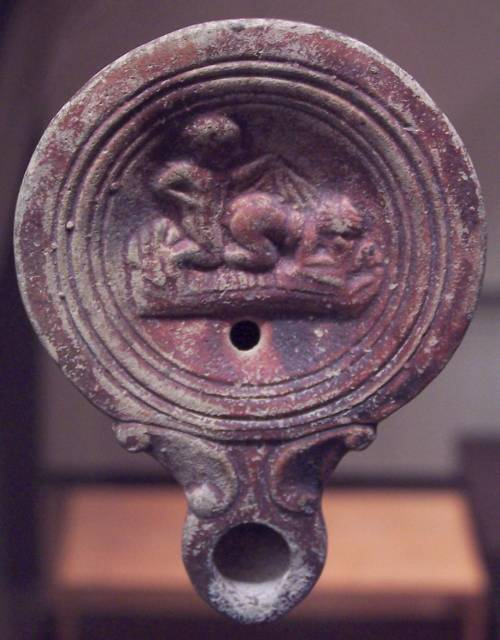
Erotic oil lamp

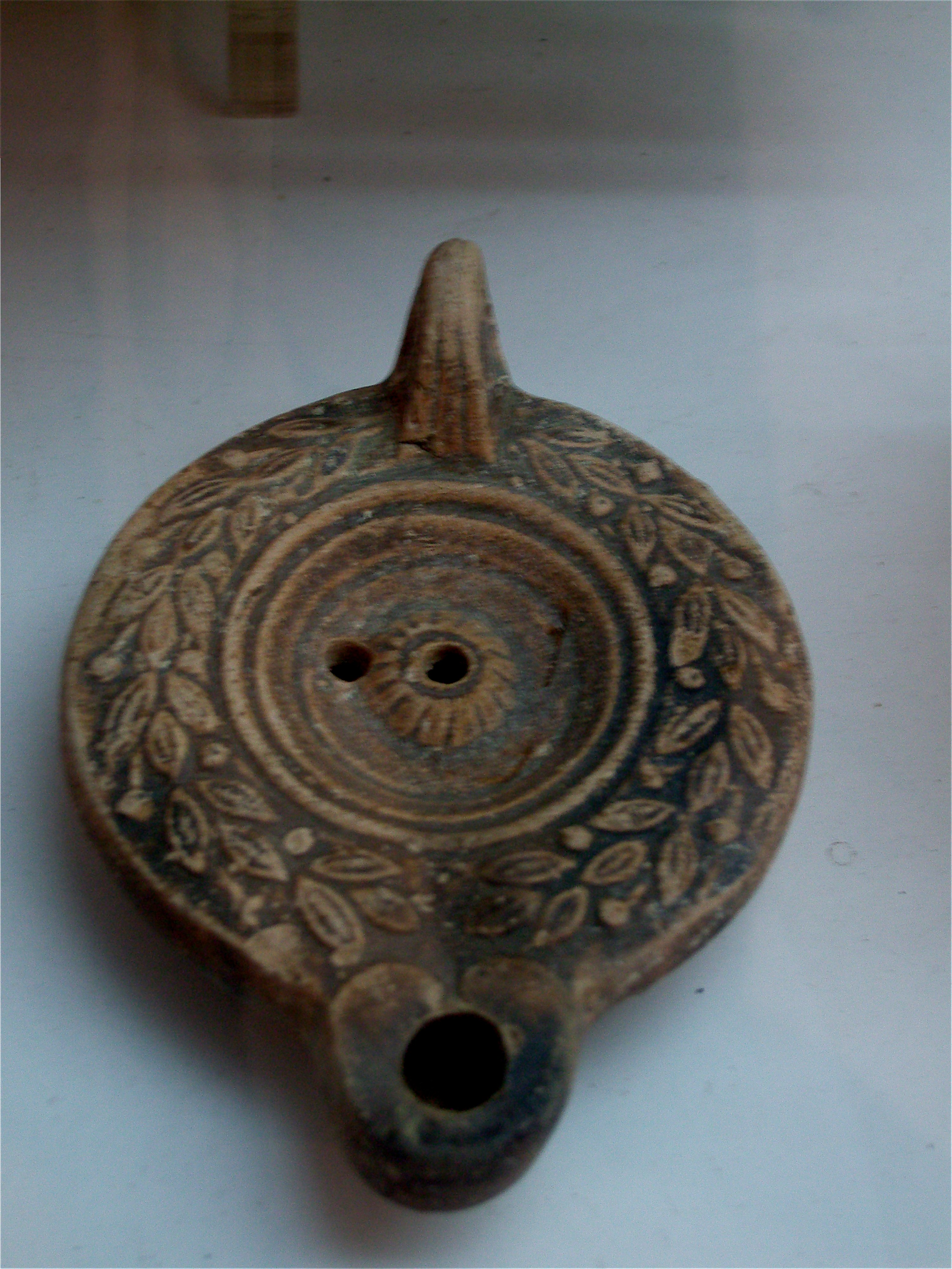
Lamp from Tunisia with foliage decoration

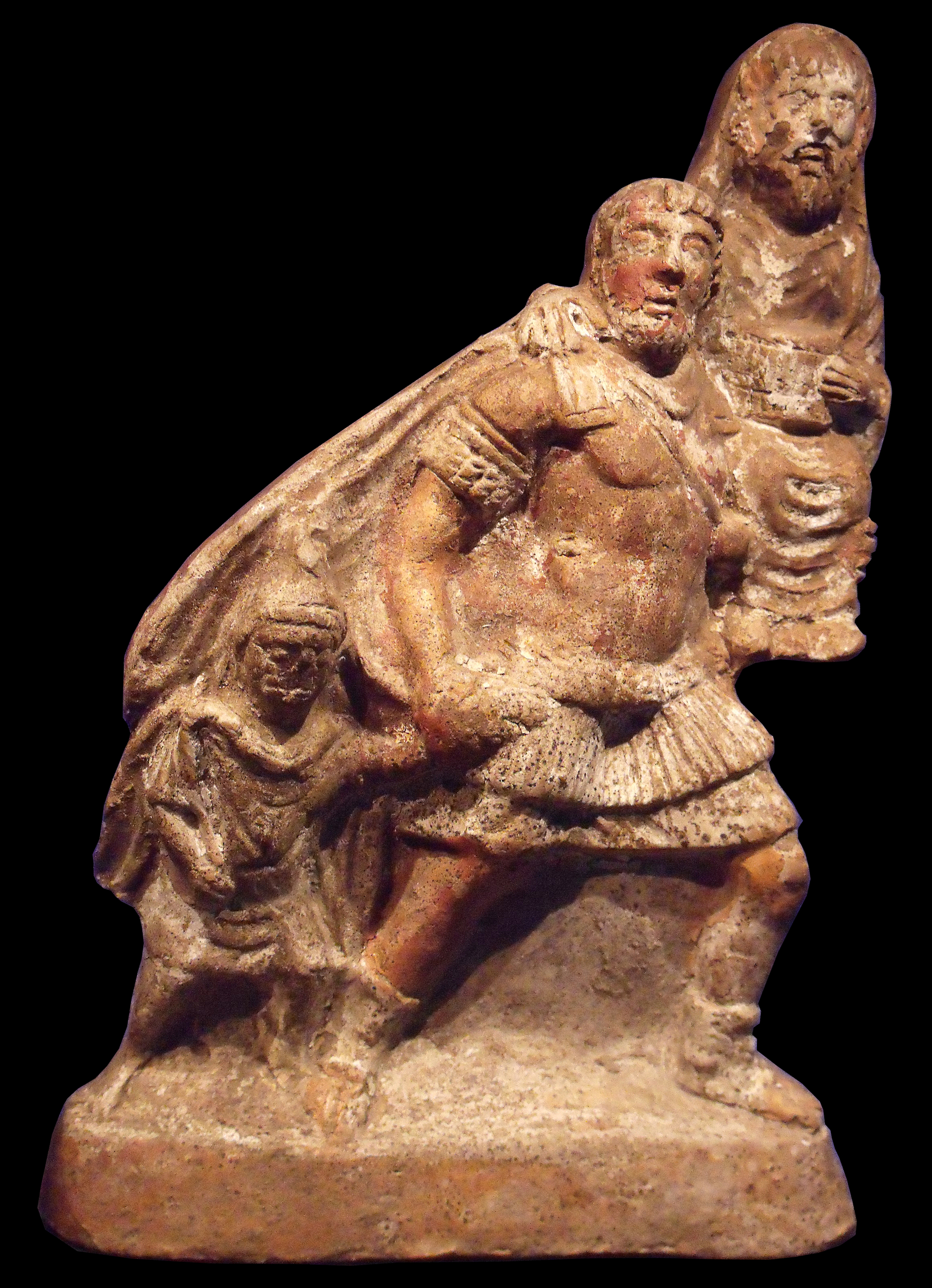
1st century AD figure, from Pompeii, of Aeneas escaping from Troy carrying his father Anchises, with traces of the original colour

=== Terracotta figurines ===
Italian styles exerted much less influence across the Empire in terracotta figurines or statuettes than in pottery vessels; here the longstanding traditions of Greek terracotta figurines, and those of Egypt and other Eastern provinces of the Empire, were the dominant influences. In some northern provinces, such as Gaul and Germany, there was no native Iron Age tradition of making terracotta figurines, but new industries developed under Roman influence manufacturing mould-made figures in fine white pipeclay. Like bronze statuettes, which would have been more expensive items, small terracotta figures were generally made for ritual or religious purposes, such as dedication at temples, display in household shrines, or as grave-goods to be deposited with the dead. However, some terracottas were also used as toys by children, even if they were not manufactured for that specific purpose. Most of the small terracotta figurines were mould-made objects manufactured in quite large numbers, and most would have been painted in bright colours when new. These pigments, applied after firing, rarely survive burial except in small and faded patches.

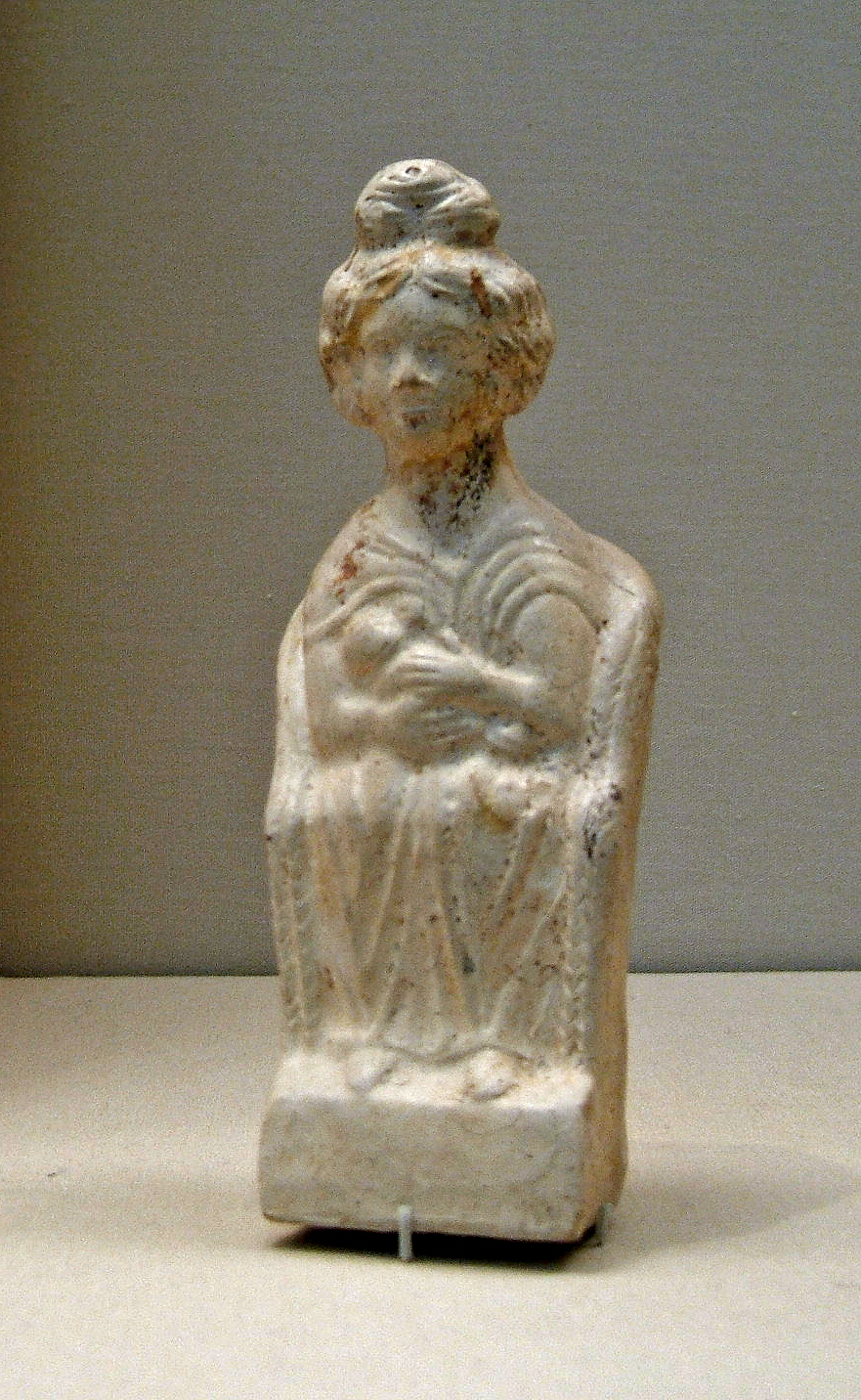
Gaulish pipeclay figurine of a mother-goddess, England, 2nd century AD

Each region of the Empire produced terracottas in distinctive local styles, but all had rather similar ranges of subjects, above all the standard religious themes of gods, goddesses and their attributes; representations of birds and animals may often be linked with specific deities, though some animal figures may well have been made without any religious or ritual purpose. The religious subjects often include local traditions and cults: for example, the Romano-Egyptian repertoire of terracottas includes Egyptian deities, such as Harpocrates, the Graeco-Roman form of Horus, while Celtic gods appear amongst those made in the Central Gaulish industries, centred in the Allier Valley and the Rhineland industry at Cologne.

A Celtic mother-goddess nursing one, or sometimes two, infants, is one of the most popular Central Gaulish types, though Venus was also very frequently represented in Gaul. The mother-goddess figurines are shown seated in high-backed basketwork chairs that seem to have been typical of Gaul and Britain. Figurines from the Allier Valley and Cologne sources sometimes bear the signatures of modellers and/or mouldmakers. As in the case of the Gaulish samian industries, the makers' names and the styles and themes all illustrate the fusion of local and Mediterranean traditions.

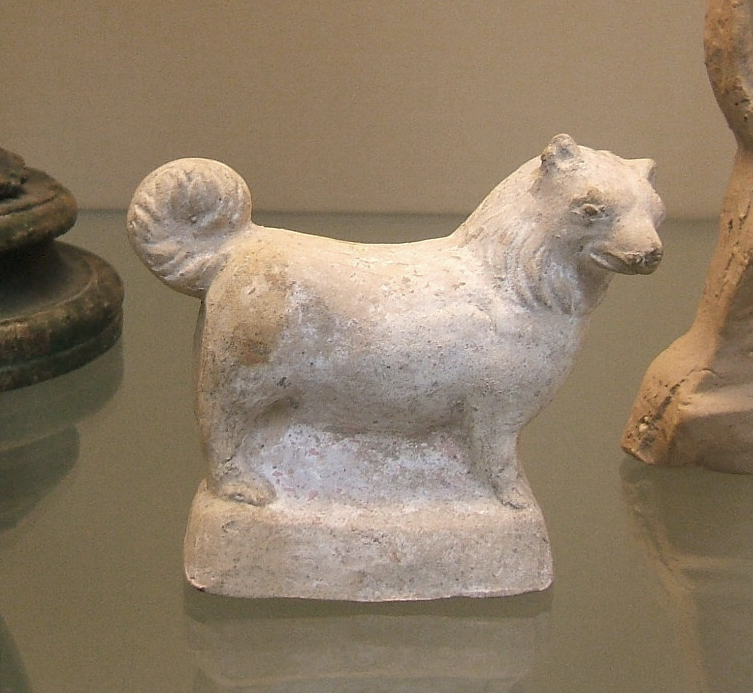
A terracotta figure of a small, fluffy dog, made in Italy in the 1st century BC – 1st AD

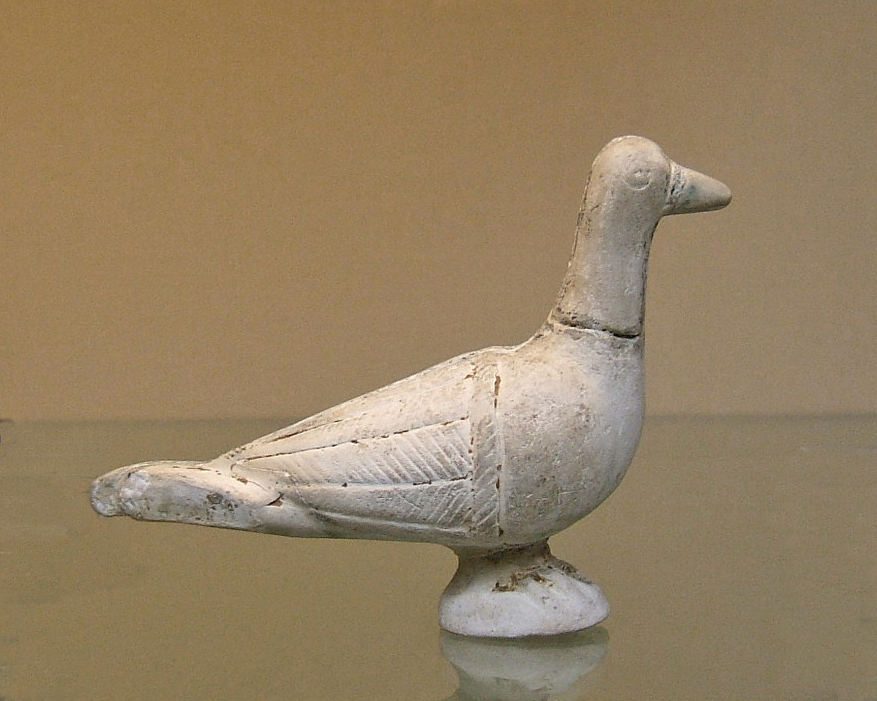
Moulded pipeclay peacock made in Central Gaul, 2nd century AD

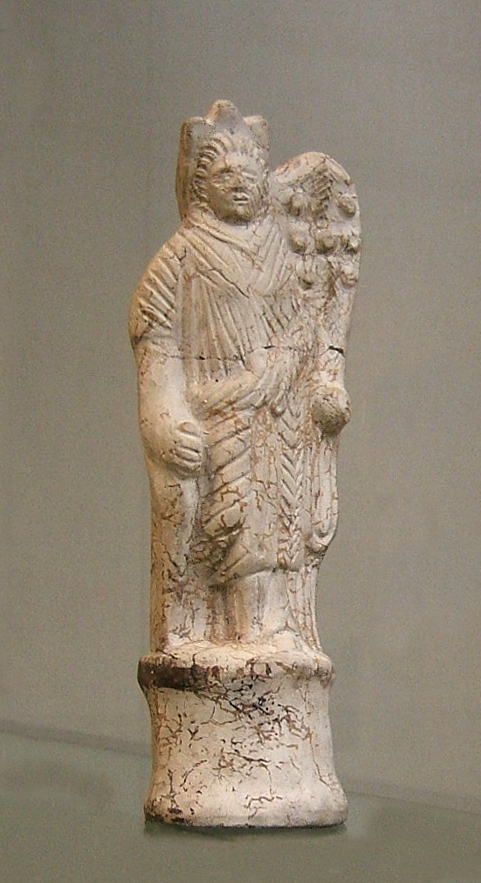
East Gaulish pipeclay figurine of the goddess Fortuna, made at Cologne. 2nd century AD.

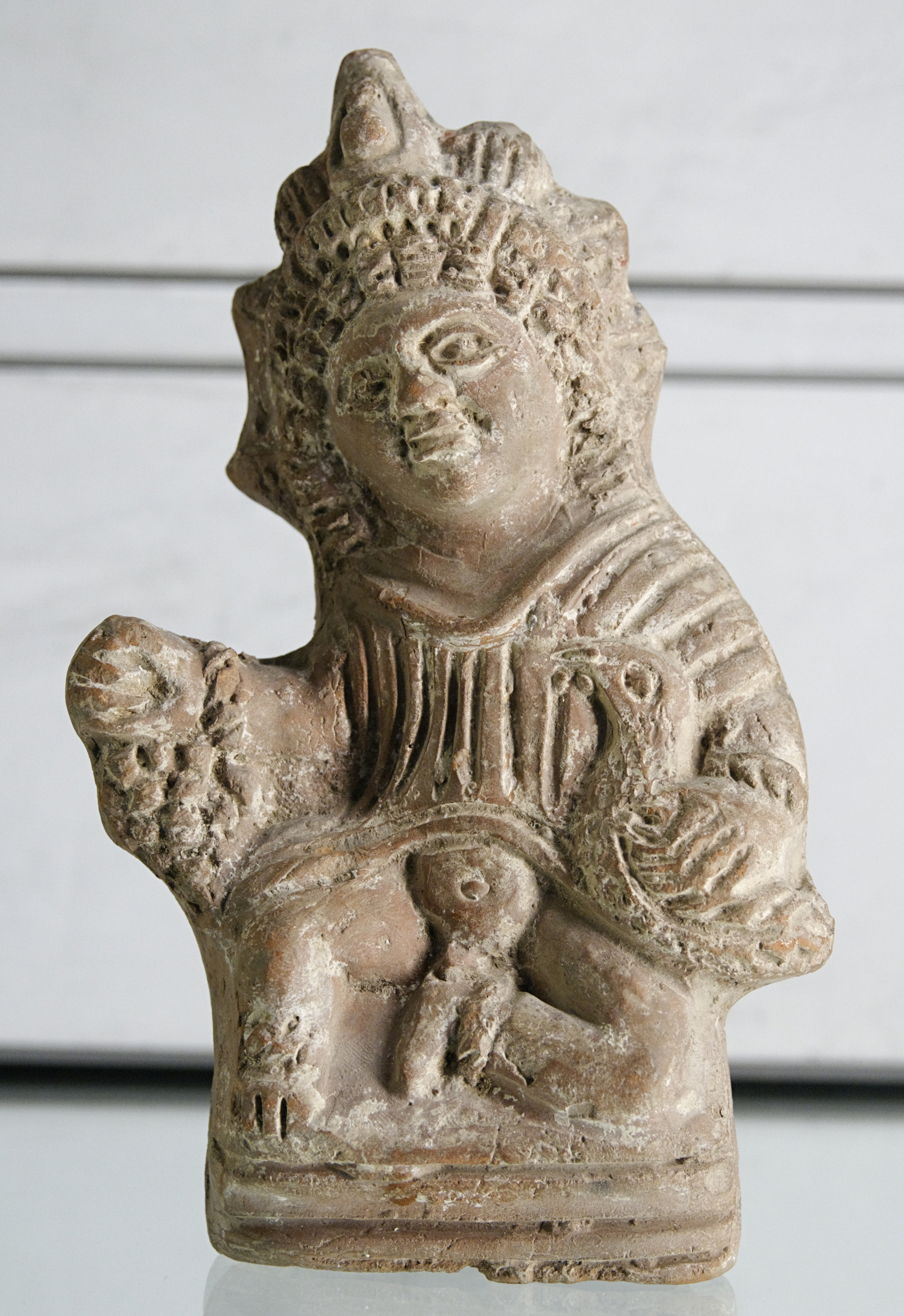
Harpocrates with a cockerel and bunch of grapes

=== Brick, tile and other architectural ceramics ===
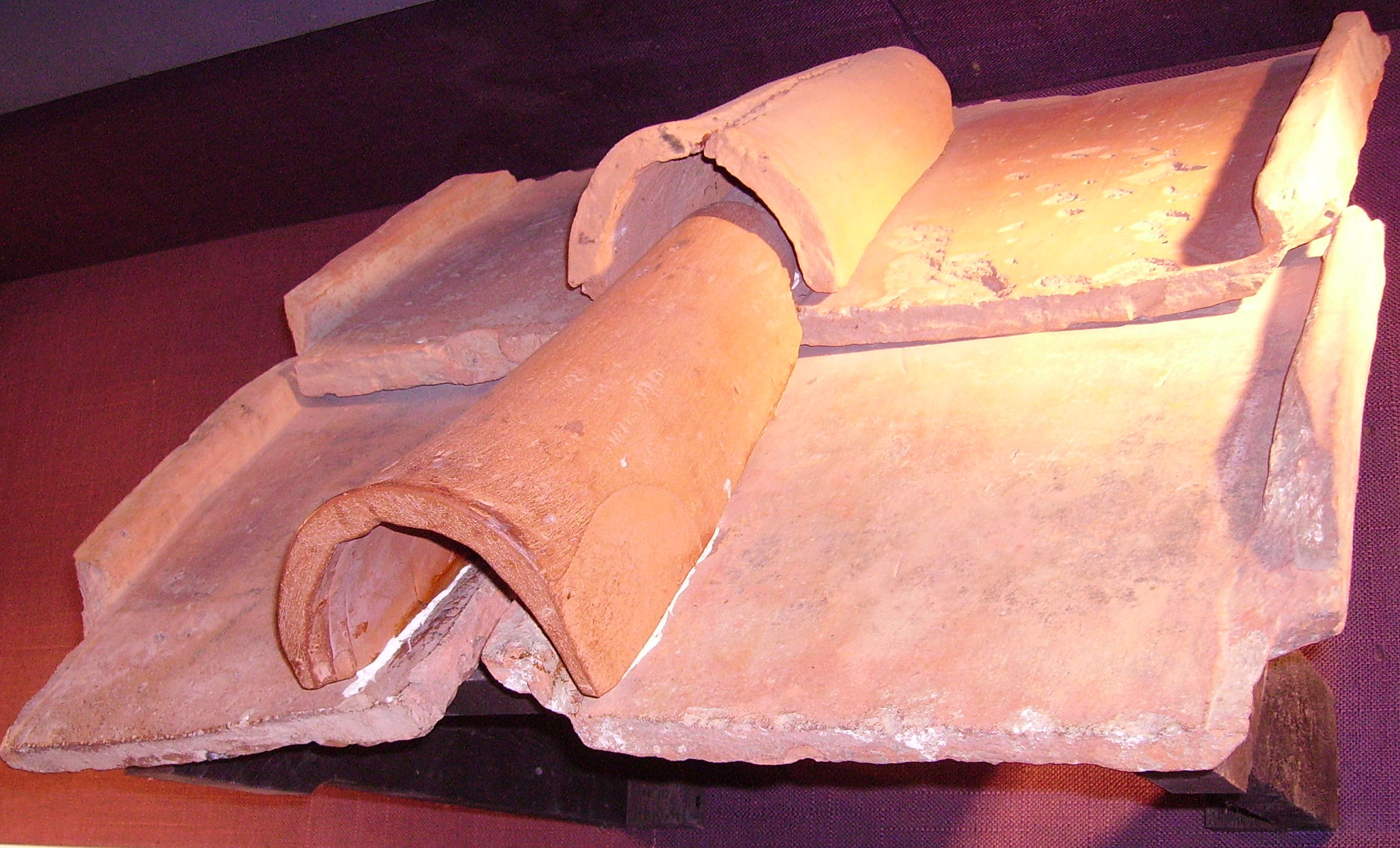
Tegula and imbrex roofing tiles from Fishbourne Roman Palace

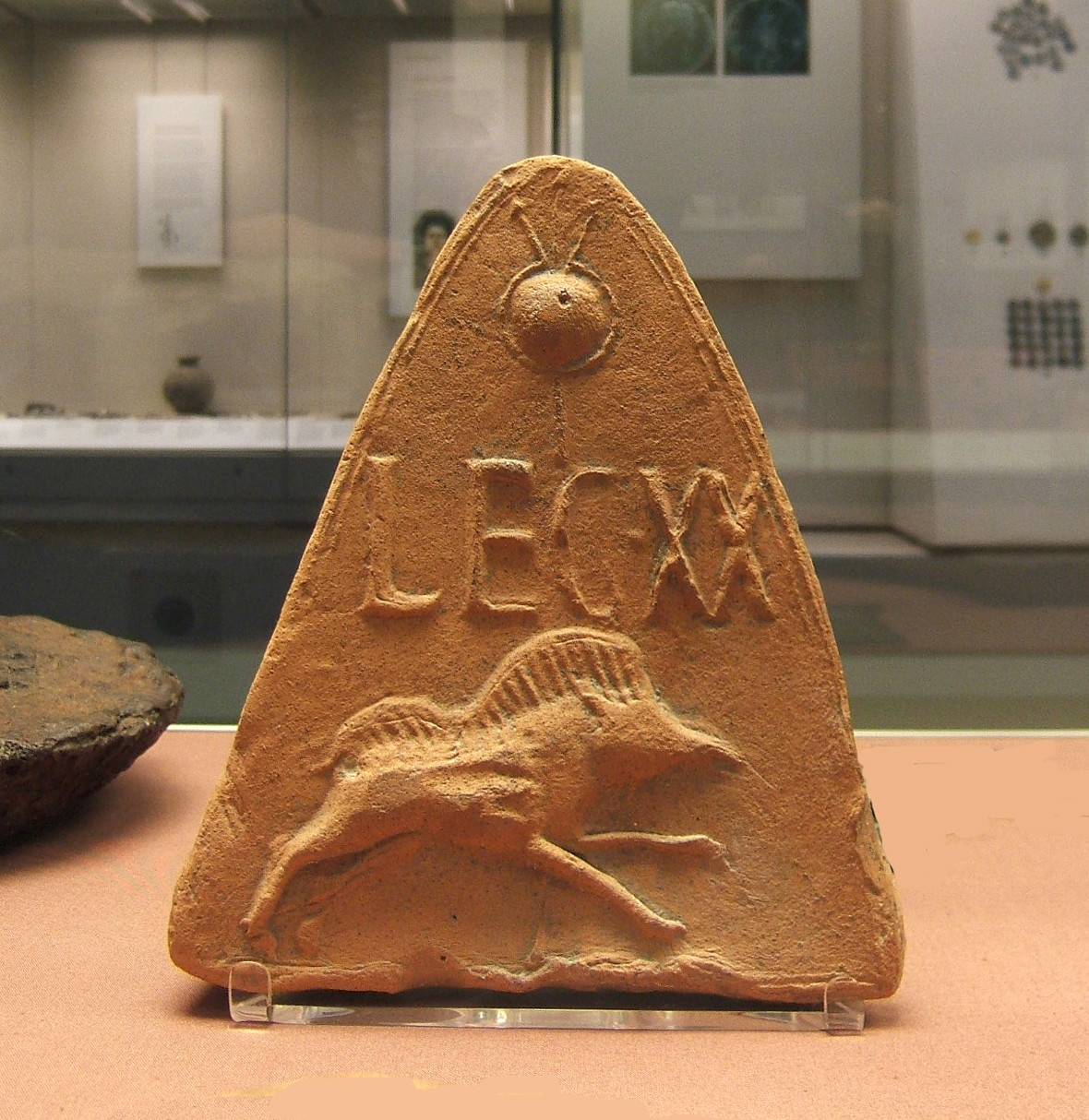
A tile antefix of the Twentieth Legion, bearing the legion's symbol, a wild boar

Two manufactured materials were of great importance in Roman architecture: concrete and fired clay in the form of structural bricks and tiles, and to a lesser extent, in architectural decoration. These materials were used in buildings all over the Roman Empire, and in many areas, they fell out of use again after the Roman period, only to be rediscovered centuries later. Like other mass-produced Roman ceramic objects, bricks and tiles were often marked with inscriptions that indicate their manufacturer, or the organisation or authority, military or civilian, for which they had been made.

The Roman bricks used for building walls are often referred to as 'tiles', because they are rather thin, flat squares, made in standard sizes, often related to the Roman foot (c. 11 inches or 280 millimetres), from around 20 cm to about 58 cm square, and about 5–7 cm thick. Even stone-built walls frequently incorporated horizontal tile-courses. Brick-built walls were finished with various types of facing, rendering or plastering on both exterior and interior surfaces, so that the bricks themselves were not visible.

Tiles used for roofing were intended to be seen, however. Roof-tiles were of distinctive shapes, the tegula (pl. tegulae), which was a large, thin tile, almost square, with upturned flanges on its longer sides, and the imbrex (pl. imbrices), of slightly tapered half-cylindrical form. The imbrices, interlocking because of their tapered form, were laid over the raised flanges of the tegulae, and together formed the characteristic ridged tiled roof still to be seen in Italy and southern France today. The pitch of such a roof has to be fairly low, not more than about 30 degrees. The roof was finished with a series of plain ridge-tiles, and often with decorative finials, which could also be of terracotta, at the gable.

Some buildings also featured antefixes, vertical ornaments of triangular or rounded shape that were placed along the edge of the roof. They, too, were often made of terracotta, and could be decorated with pictorial motifs intended to avert ill-luck, or with inscriptions: those made in military tileries attached to legionary forts bore the number and symbol of the relevant legion.

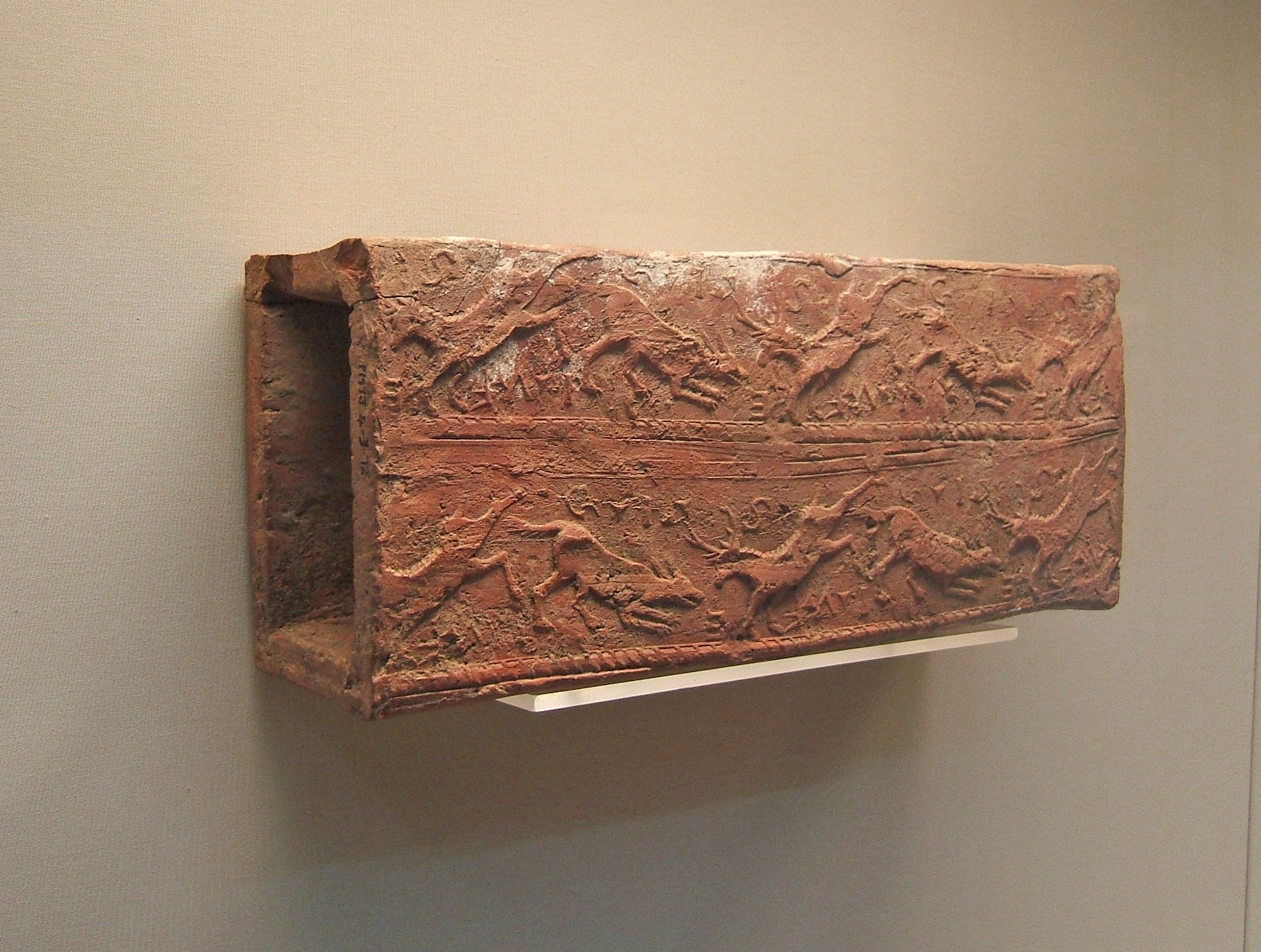
A flue-tile with surface decoration that would have been hidden in use

Roman hypocaust heating systems made extensive use of fired clay elements: The space beneath the floor of a room to be heated was supported on robust pillars (pilae), usually made of small, square bricks mortared together, so that the heat from the adjacent furnace could circulate freely. In public and private bath-houses (essential to the Roman way of life), heat was also carried up through the walls in flues made of interlocking box-tiles. Though these were covered up by wall facings both inside and out, they were sometimes manufactured with quite elaborate geometric and even figural decoration. Pipes for water and drainage were also often made of fired clay.

Ceramic tiles were not normally used for flooring in Roman buildings, though opus signinum, a favoured flooring material, was composed of concrete and crushed tile, and carefully cut small squares from tiles were often used in mosaic floors, tesserae about 2–3 cm. square being used for plain borders, and smaller squares, about 1 cm., where a red colour was required in a pictorial mosaic with multi-coloured geometric or figural designs.

The edge of a roof might be embellished with plaques called antefixes, as mentioned above, and some pottery relief "revetment" panels with figurative scenes for setting into walls emulate the marble friezes of grand temples. These are still often called "Campana reliefs", after Giampietro Campana, the 19th-century Italian scholar and collector who first studied them. They were developed from about 50 BC and were used almost entirely in Italy between Tuscany and Campania – areas once in the ambit of the Etruscan culture of which they seem a continuation. Initially used on small temples, they are later found on a wide range of public and private buildings. Usually between 22 and 50 cm high and 27 to 48 cm wide, plaques were perhaps typically arranged in bands or friezes. Subjects are usually drawn from mythology. They cease to be found after the middle of the 2nd century; they had to compete with moulded stucco as well as wall-paintings.

In archaeology, bricks and tiles, especially when encountered only in fragmentary form, are often classified under the generic term ceramic building material or CBM.

== Gallery ==
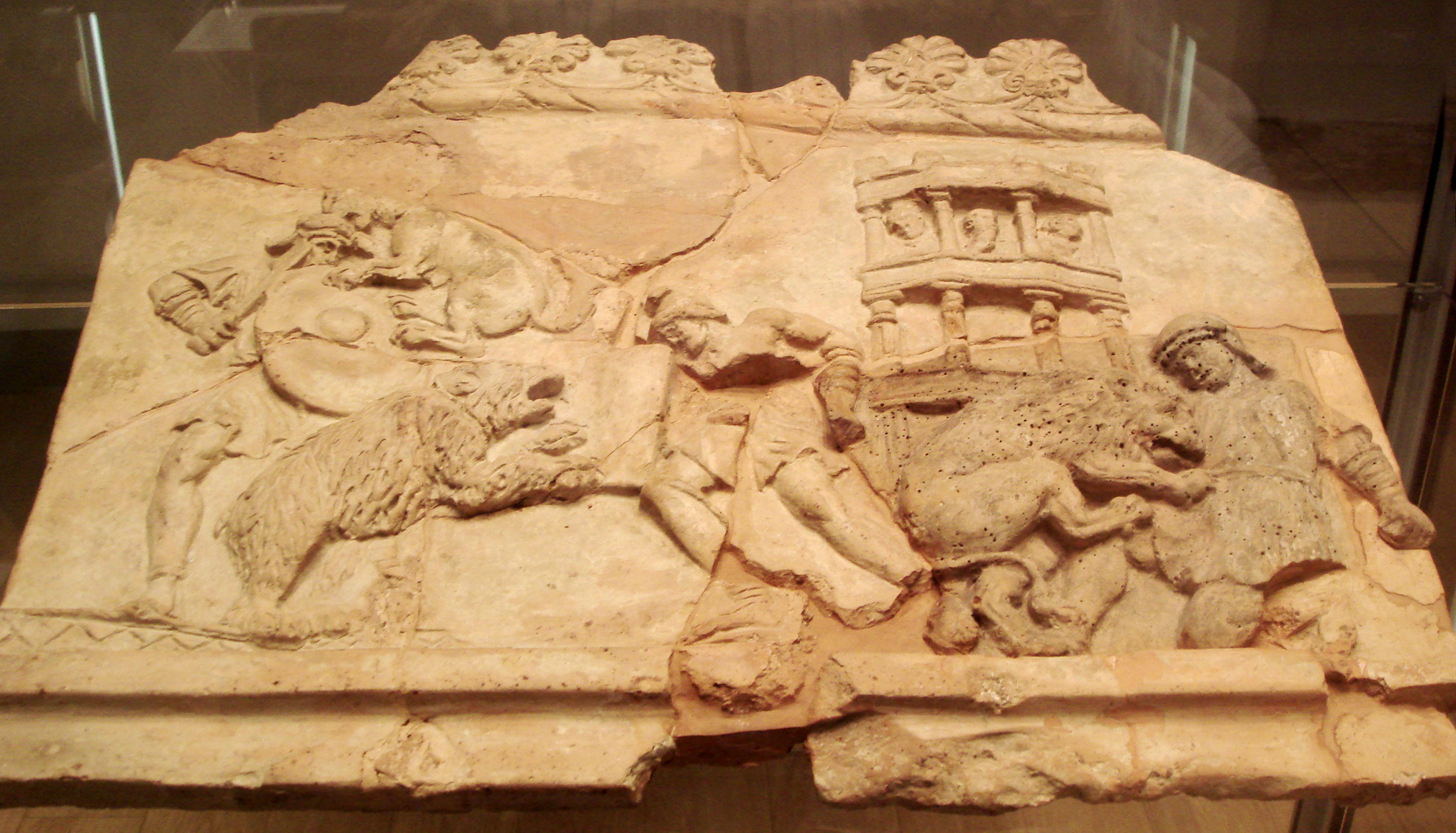
1st-century AD revetment plaque, probably from a frieze, with a venatio in an arena

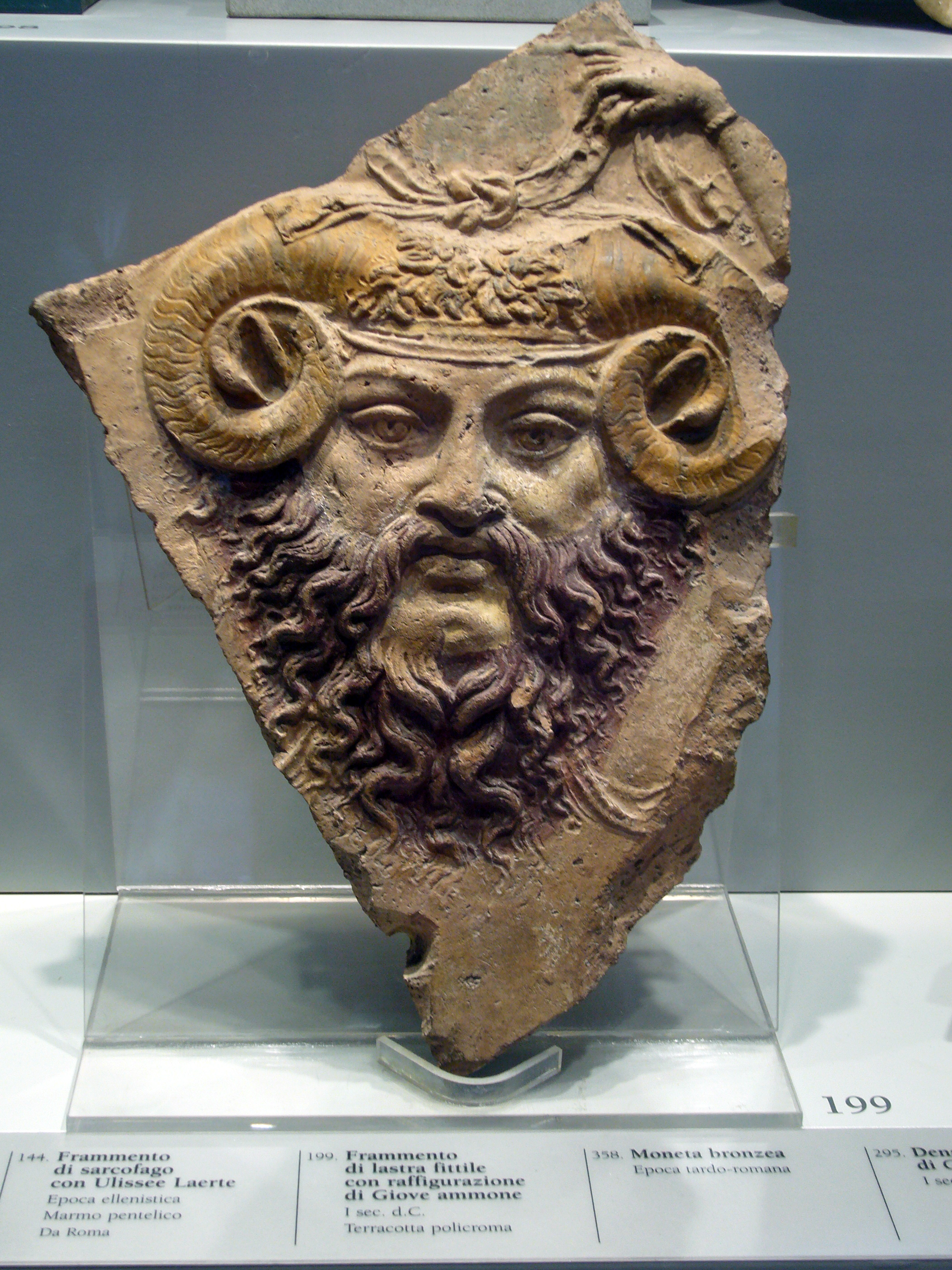
1st-century AD fragment with head of Jupiter Ammon, of unusually fine quality, reflecting Hellenistic style

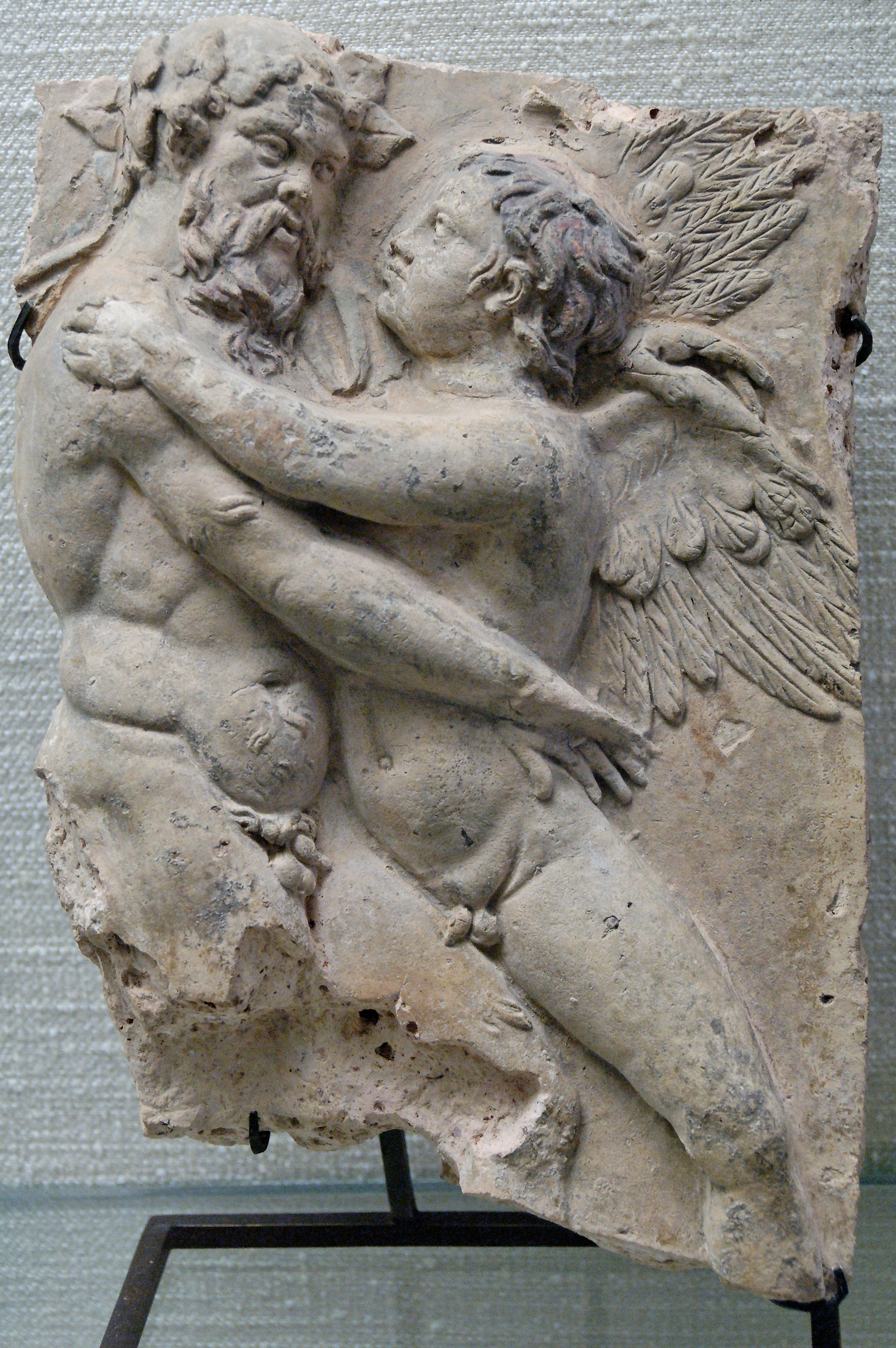
Silenus and Eros, fragment from a terracotta relief found in Italy, early 1st century AD

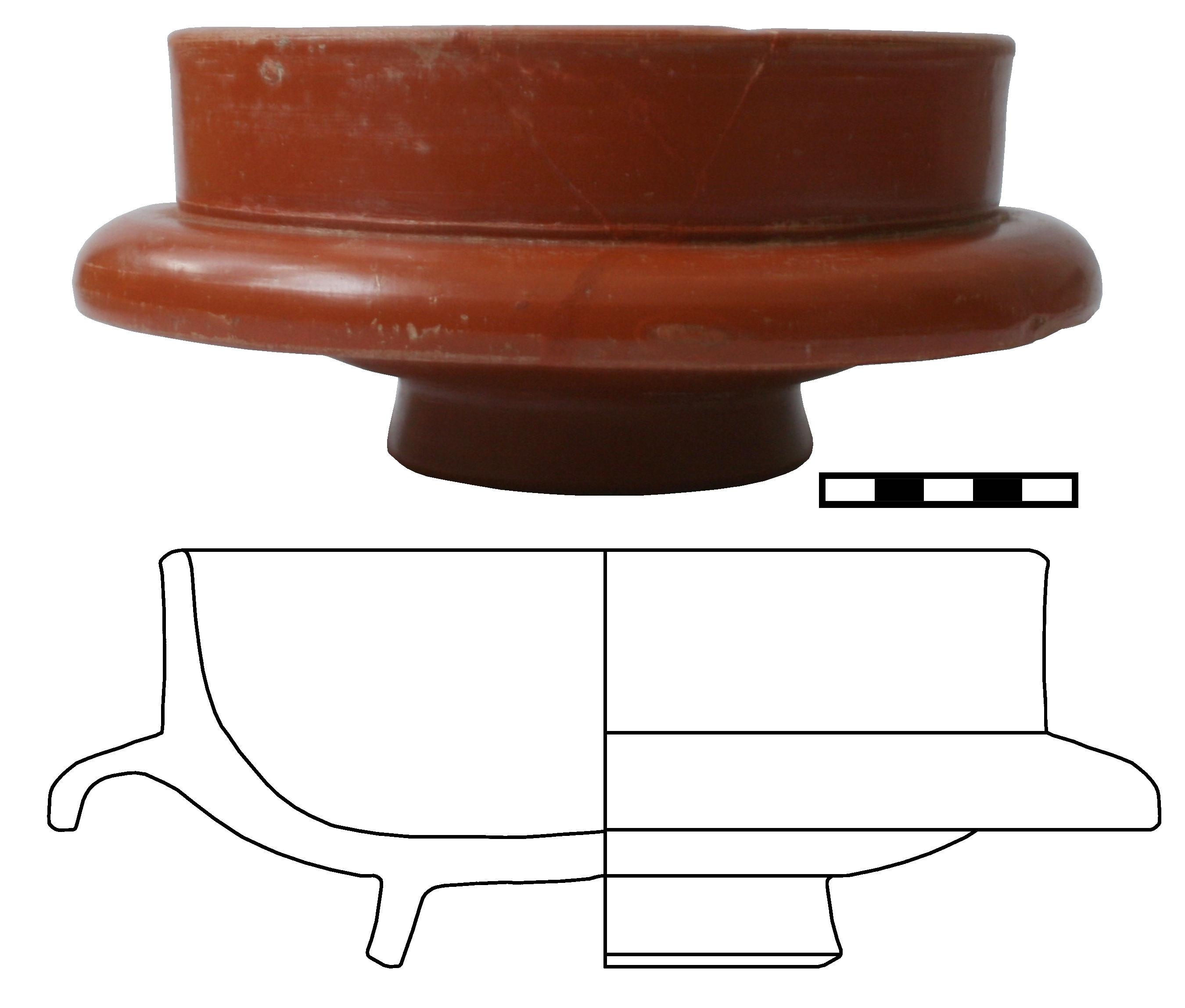
Example and diagram of the terra sigillata shape "Dragendorff 38"
