= Phocaean red slip =

Type of Ancient Roman pottery

Phocaean red slip (PRS) is a category of terra sigillata, or "fine" Ancient Roman pottery produced in or near the ancient city of Phokaia in Asia Minor. It is recognizable by its thin reddish slip over a fine fabric, often with occasional white (lime) inclusions. The main period of production is the late 4th century AD into the 7th century, contemporary to the later production of African red slip. All forms are open bowls or dishes. Later forms have stamped decoration.

The most widely used typology was defined by John Hayes in his book Late Roman Pottery, where the ware is called "Late Roman C" according to the name given by Frederick Waagé in his publication of the Antioch excavations. The supplement to that volume established the name "Phocaean Red Slip". Hayes form 3 and Hayes form 10 are the most widely exported forms, appearing in the western Mediterranean and also in the British Isles.

== Table of Common Forms ==
Form	Start date	End date
Hayes form 1	375	475
Hayes form 1a	375	425
Hayes form 1b	425	475
Hayes form 1c	400	450
Hayes form 1d	425	475
Hayes form 2	370	450
Hayes form 2a	370	450
Hayes form 2b	425	450
Hayes form 2c	370	400
Hayes form 3	425	600
Hayes form 3a	425	450
Hayes form 3b	440	500
Hayes form 3b/c	440	500
Hayes form 3b/d	440	500
Hayes form 3c	440	500
Hayes form 3d	450	500
Hayes form 3e	475	525
Hayes form 3e/f	475	600
Hayes form 3f	500	600
Hayes form 3g	500	600
Hayes form 3h	500	600
Hayes form 4	425	450
Hayes form 5	460	550
Hayes form 5a	460	500
Hayes form 5b	500	550
Hayes form 6	500	525
Hayes form 7	480	525
Hayes form 8	450	510
Hayes form 9	520	600
Hayes form 10	570	650
Hayes form 10a	570	620
Hayes form 10b	570	650
Hayes form 10c	570	650
