= Aretine =

Aretine may refer to:

- A person from Arezzo in Tuscany, Italy
- Arretine ware, pottery produced near Tuscany, Italy, since the first century B.C.
