= Brenda Dickinson =

British archaeologist and pottery specialist

Brenda Dickinson FSA

Academic work
- Discipline: Roman archaeology
- Sub-discipline: Pottery studies
- Institutions: University of Leeds

Brenda Dickinson FSA is a British archaeologist. She is a leading scholar in the study of Roman pottery, and a specialist in Roman potter's stamps.

== Career ==
Dickinson collaborated with Brian Hartley at the University of Leeds. Together they catalogued samian stamps over a 40-year period from central and western Europe. The catalogue was published in a nine-part volume in 2008 entitled 'Names on Terra Sigillata. An Index of Makers' Stamps & Signatures on Gallo-Roman Terra Sigillata (Samian Ware)', containing around 300,000 stamps from 5,000 potters. Dickinson is credited with turning "Brian Hartley's vision of an index of dies linked to historical data into a reality in book form." The volumes are accompanied by a database hosted by the RGZM. Throughout her career Dickinson authored numerous site reports on samian stamps.

Dickinson was an Honorary Visiting Fellow in Classics 2006–12 at the University of Leeds.

== Awards and honours ==
She was elected as a Fellow of the Society of Antiquaries in 1994. A Festschrift was published in honour of Dickinson in 2012.

Dickinson and colleagues received the 2013 John Gillam Prize from the Study Group for Roman Pottery.

== Selected publications ==
- Hartley, Brian R.; Dickinson, Brenda M. (2008–2012). Names on Terra Sigillata: an index of makers' stamps & signatures on Gallo-Roman terra sigillata (Samian ware). London: Institute of Classical Studies, University of London. (9 vols)
