= La Graufesenque =

Archaeological site in France

Coordinates: 44.0972°N 3.0921°E

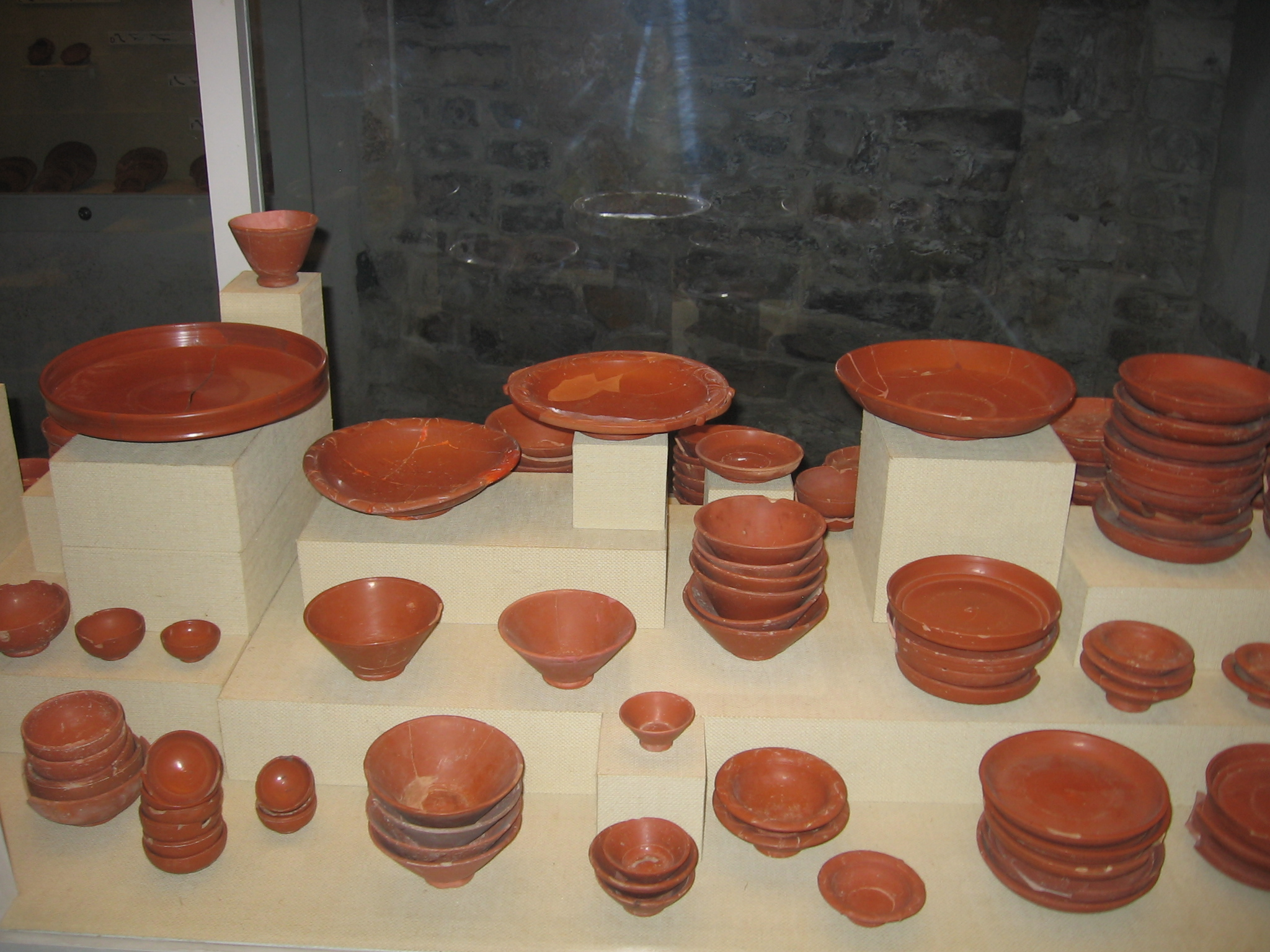
Selection of undecorated terra sigillata from La Graufesenque.

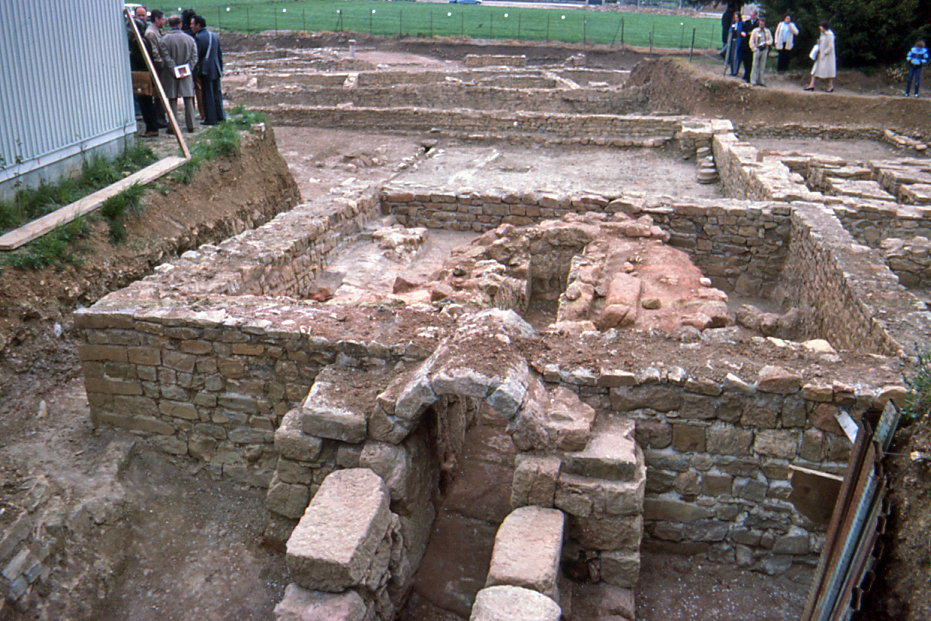
The remains of the grand four ("big kiln") at La Graufesenque.

La Graufesenque is an archaeological site 2 km from Millau, Aveyron, France, at the confluence of the rivers Tarn and Dourbie. As Condatomagus (market of the confluent), it was famous in the Gallo-Roman period for the production of high quality dark red terra sigillata Roman pottery, which was made in vast quantities and exported over much of the western part of the Roman Empire.

The site, partly owned by the commune and partly private, has been listed by the French Ministry of Culture since 1926. It was classified as a monument historique in 1995.

== History ==
Production of pottery at La Graufesenque started under the reign of Augustus. Production reached a peak in the third quarter of the first century, and declined as a major exporter thereafter. Reduced activity servicing local needs continued until the third century.

The pottery was made from local clay with a red slip and fired in wood burning kilns which could hold up to 40 thousand items. More than six hundred pottery workshops are known to have been in operation, although a few dozen were prominent.

== Bibliography ==
- Bémont, C. and Jacob, J.-P. (1986) "La Terre sigillée gallo-romaine. Lieux de production du Haut Empire: implantations, produits, relations". Documents d'archéologie française, 6, Maison des Sciences de l'Homme, Paris.
- Bémont, C., Vernhet, A. and Beck, F., (1987) La Graufesenque. Village de potiers gallo-romains. Ministère de la Culture et de la Communication.
- Hermet, F. (1934) La Graufesenque (Condatomago). Librairie Ernest Leroux, Paris.
- Marichal, R., (1988) "Les graffites de la Graufesenque". Supplément à Gallia, 47, Éditions du CNRS, Paris.
