= Eastern sigillata A =

Type of ancient Greek and Roman pottery

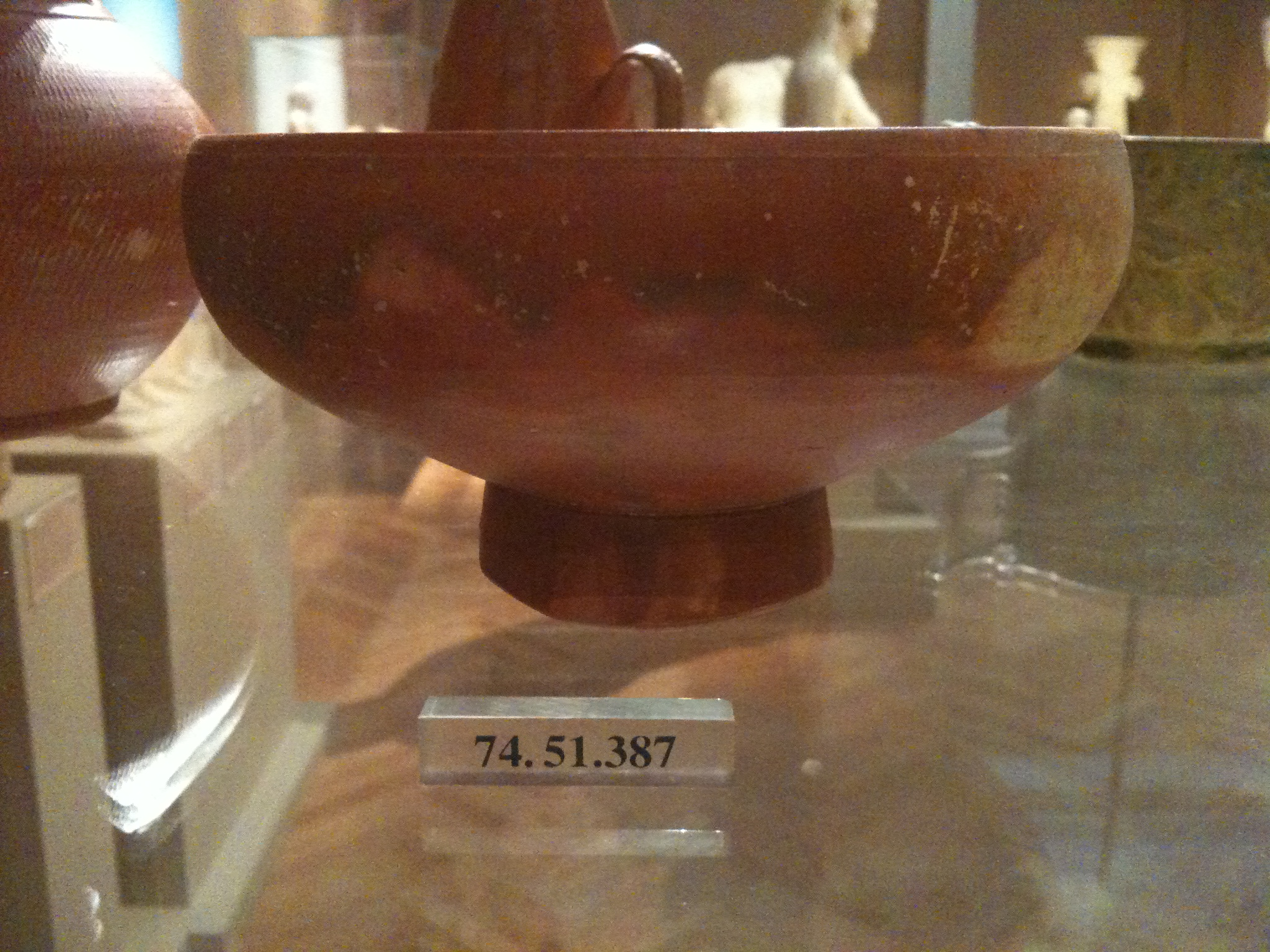
Eastern sigillata A bowl

ESA Hayes form 2 Profile

In archeology, eastern sigillata A (ESA) is a category of late Hellenistic and early Roman terra sigillata pottery. In 1957, Kathleen Kenyon introduced categories A, B, C, to classify eastern sigillata without determining the exact place of manufacture. For ESA, still no production centers have been identified but distribution patterns suggest an origin in northern Syria. ESA is distinguished by the fineness of its fabric, which stands out as very pale in comparison to the deep red-slip that usually covers all surfaces. When fully applied, the slip is of a consistent color and thickness across the vessel. There are many examples on which the thickness of the slip varies considerably or on which firing is inconsistent and very dark in patches.

A full range of plates, bowls, cups and jugs was produced. Early forms develop in the context of an eastern Mediterranean Hellenistic Koine Greek, while later products are influenced by trends originating in Italian workshops. Many ESA forms are mold-made and exhibit distinct delineation between walls and floors as well as elegantly curved exterior and base profiles. A further technical feature is the frequent occurrence of a "double-dipping streak" that is the result of, first, one half of a vessel being dipped in dilute slip and then the other half being similarly treated. The consequent overlap produced a line of thicker slip that became visibly darker during firing.

== See also ==
- Eastern sigillata B (ESB)
- Eastern sigillata C (ESC)
- Eastern sigillata D (ESD)
