= Hans Dragendorff =

Baltic German archeologist

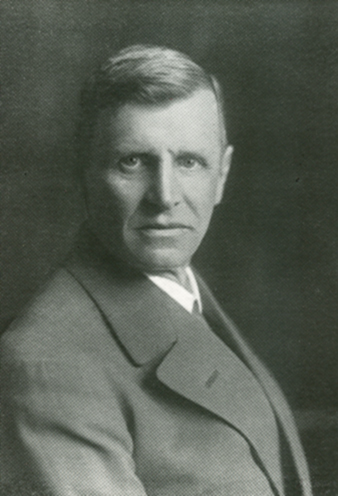
Hans Dragendorff

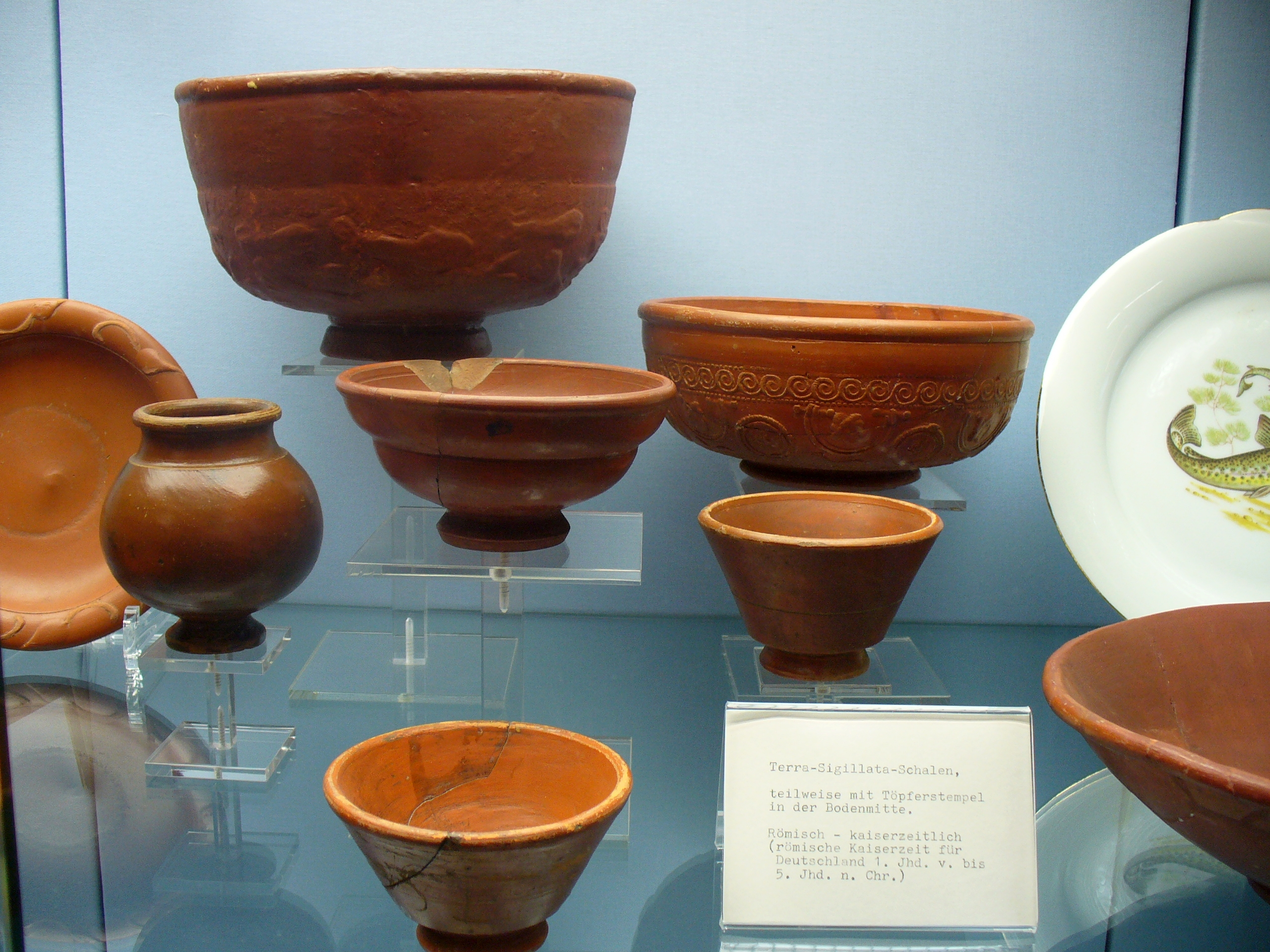
Terra sigillata bowls (the red gloss ones). See image file for their "Dragendorff numbers"

Hans Dragendorff (15 October 1870 in Dorpat (Tartu), Estonia – 29 January 1941 in Freiburg, Germany) was a Baltic German scholar who introduced the first classification system for the type of Ancient Roman pottery known as Samian ware or Terra sigillata, in 1896, using type numbers. His scheme was based on the varying forms the vessels took and although it has since been augmented and refined by others, it is still common to refer to 'Dragendorff type 37' bowls, for example.

== Biography ==
Dragendorff studied in Dorpat, Berlin and Bonn with Georg Loeschcke and received his doctorate in 1894 for his work on Terra sigillata. He held an extraordinary chair in Basel till 1902, when he became director of the newly founded "Römisch-Germanische Kommission" (RGK) of the 'Deutsches Archäologisches Institut' (DAI), a post which he held until 1911. From 1911 to 1922, he was secretary general of the DAI. In 1922, he took a chair in Freiburg, a post he held until 1933.

Dragendorff was a member of the DAI (1901, corresponding member since 1898), member of the directorial board of the DAI from 1931 to 1941, member of the RGK (1902–1941), member of the Prussian Academy of Sciences (1916), and Honorary Fellow of the Society of Antiquaries of London (1933).

== Sources ==
- for an obituary, see 'Nachrichtenblatt für Deutsche Vorzeit' 17, 1941, 57–62.
- (in German) Hans Dragendorff, biography, on deutsche-biographie.de
- Potsherd Searchable database by Dragendorff and other classification systems
