= Hundred of Roby =

- Cadastral division
- Coordinates: 35.421°S 139.757°E
- Country: Australia
- State: South Australia
- LGA(s): Coorong District Council
- Established: March 30, 1899

Area
  - Total: 370 km^{2} (143 sq mi)
- County: County of Buccleuch
Lands administrative divisions around Hundred of Roby
Seymour	Sherlock	Peake
Seymour; Coolinong	Roby	Riddoch
Coolinong	Kirkpatrick; Livingston	Livingston

The Hundred of Roby is a hundred within the County of Buccleuch in the Mallee region of South Australia.

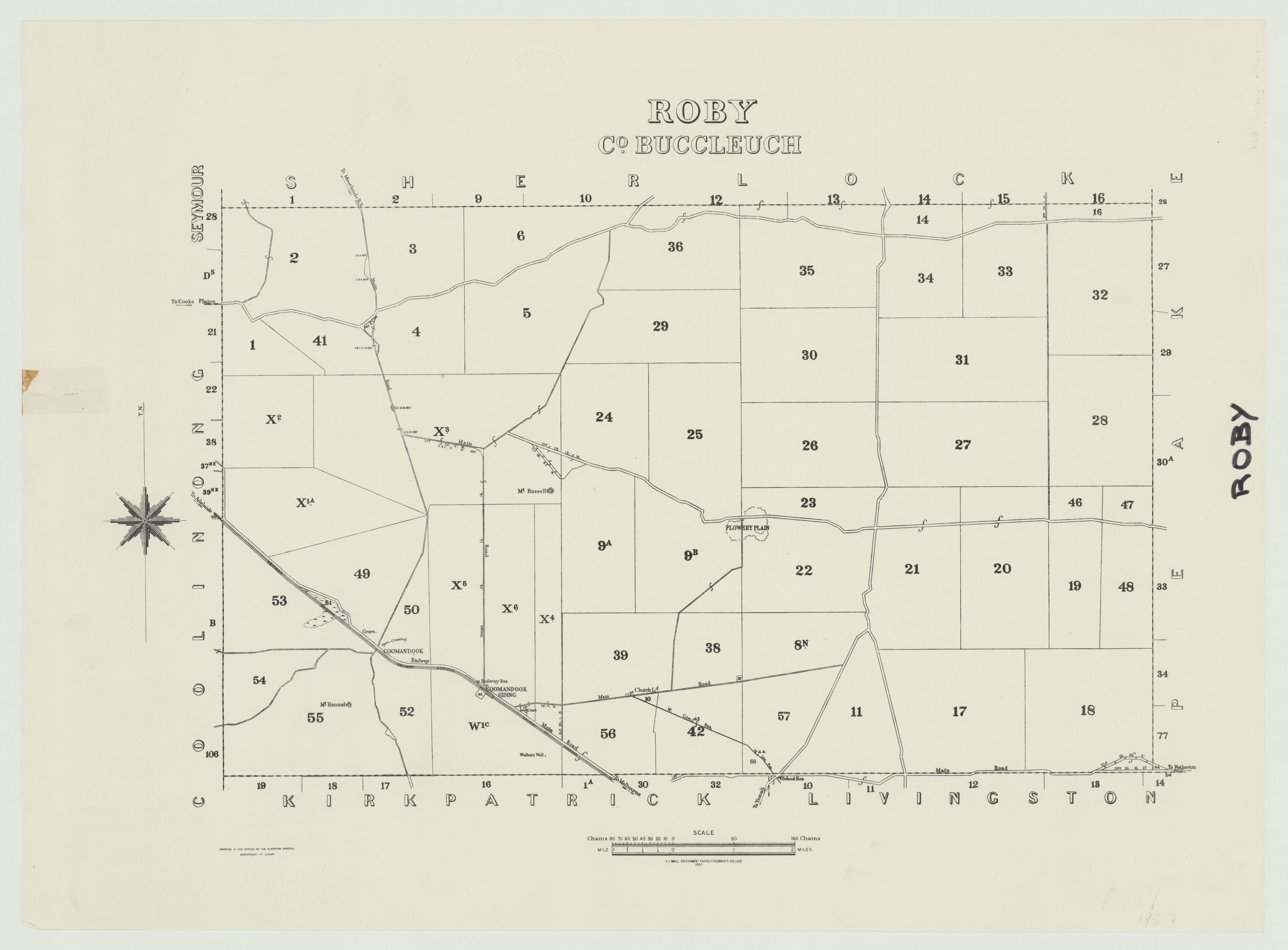
1957 plan of the Hundred of Roby

The only township within the hundred is Coomandook, a settlement about 120 kilometres (75 mi) east-south-east of Adelaide on Dukes Highway. Parts of the localities of Cooke Plains, Sherlock, Peake, and Yumali also lie within the hundred.

== Local government ==
In 1911 the District Council of Peake was proclaimed and the Hundred of Roby became one of four wards within the new council area. When Peake was amalgamated with the district councils of Coonalpyn Downs and Meningie in 1997 the hundred became part of the much larger Coorong District Council.
