= Electoral district of Albert (South Australia) =

Former South Australian state electoral district

Coordinates: 35°S 140°E

Albert South Australia—House of Assembly
- State: South Australia
- Dates current: 1875–1902, 1915–1970
- Namesake: Albert, Prince Consort
- Demographic: Rural

Albert was an electoral district of the House of Assembly in South Australia, spanning its time as both a colony and a state. It was created in 1875, taking much territory from adjacent Victoria, merged with Victoria in 1902 as Victoria and Albert, separated again in 1915, and abolished in 1970.

In 1875, Albert had booths at Bordertown, Kingston, Meningie, Naracoorte, Robe and Wellington East. It added booths at Lucindale (1878), Mannum East (1884), Wolseley (1885) and Mundulla (1887). It lost the Mannum East booth in 1890, but added further booths at Frances, Glenroy and Keith in 1893, at which time the Naracoorte booth was also renamed Kincraig. In 1896, Albert also added booths at Conmurra, Holder, Kingston on Murray, Lyrup, Murtho, Point McLeay, Pyap and Waikerie, but lost Glenroy. It regained a Glenroy booth and added Cookes Plains in 1899. It was then merged with Victoria as Victoria and Albert from the 1902 state election.

The recreated Albert seat in 1915 had booths at Alawoona, Berri, Bogg Flat, Borrika, Chapman Bore, Cookes Plains, Coomandook, Clarfield, Coonalpyn, East Wellington, Geranium, Glenope, Hooper, Karoonda, Lameroo, Loxton, Lyrup, Marmon Jabuk, Meningie, Moorlands, Netherton, Notts Well, Paisley, Pangira, Parilla, Parrakie, Paruna, Peake, Point McLeay, Poyntz Bore, Pinnaroo, Pyap West, Sandalwood, Sherlock, Swan Reach, Tailem Bend, Taplan, Tintinara, Waikerie, Wanbi, West Wellington and Wilkawatt.

In 1938, the House of Assembly changed from multi-member to single-member districts, and Albert was redistributed as a smaller district along significantly district boundaries, losing territory along the Murray River to the new seats of Chaffey and Ridley and the redistributed Murray. The new Albert had booths at Ashville, Bordertown, Buccleuch, Cannawigara, Clanfield, Cookes Plains, Coomandook, Coonalpyn, Cotton, Custon, Geranium, Gurrai, Jabuk, Karte, Ki Ki, Kulkami, Keith, Kongal, Lameroo, Meningie, Moorlands, Mulpata North, Mundalla, Narrung, Netherton, Padthaway, Parilla, Parrakie, Peake, Peebinga, Pinnaroo, Point McLeay, Sherlock, Tintinara, Wilkawatt, Wirrega and Wolseley.

== Members ==
First incarnation (1875–1902)
Member	Party	Term	Member	Party	Term
Arthur Hardy		1875–1887	Mountifort Conner		1875–1875
Arthur Hardy		1875–1887	William Wigley		1875–1878
Arthur Hardy		1875–1887	Rudolph Henning		1878–1885
Arthur Hardy		1875–1887	Andrew Handyside		1885–1891
Beaumont Moulden		1887–1890	Andrew Handyside		1885–1891
George Ash		1890–1891	Andrew Handyside		1885–1891
George Ash	Defence League	1891–1896	Andrew Handyside	Defence League	1891–1896
Archibald Peake		1897–1902	Andrew Handyside		1897–1902
Second incarnation (1915–1938)
Member	Party	Term	Member	Party	Term
William Angus	Liberal Union	1915–1921	Richard O'Connor	Liberal Union	1915–1921
Malcolm McIntosh	Country	1921–1928	Frederick McMillan	Country	1921–1928
Malcolm McIntosh	Liberal Federation	1928–1932	Frederick McMillan	Liberal Federation	1928–1932
Malcolm McIntosh	Liberal and Country	1932–1938	Frederick McMillan	Liberal and Country	1932–1933
Malcolm McIntosh	Liberal and Country	1932–1938	Tom Stott	Independent	1933–1938

Single-member (1938–1970)
Member	Party	Term
Malcolm McIntosh	Liberal and Country	1938–1959
Bill Nankivell	Liberal and Country	1959–1970
