= Culburra, South Australia =

Culburra South Australia
- Coordinates: 35°48′53″S 139°57′49″E
- Population: 81 (SAL 2021)
- Established: 1914 (sub-division); 24 August 2000 (locality)
- Postcode(s): 5261
- Time zone: ACST (UTC+9:30)
  - Summer (DST): ACST (UTC+10:30)
- Location: 158 km (98 mi) SE of Adelaide; 77 km (48 mi) SE of Tailem Bend
- LGA(s): The Coorong District Council
- Region: Murray and Mallee
- County: Buccleuch; Cardwell
- State electorate(s): Mackillop
- Federal division(s): Barker
Mean max temp	Mean min temp	Annual rainfall
22.9 °C; 73 °F	8.0 °C; 46 °F	407.9 mm 16.1 in
Localities around Culburra:
Coonalpyn	Coonalpyn	Tintinara
Field	Culburra	Tintinara
Field	Tintinara	Tintinara
- Footnotes: Locations; Adjoining localities

Culburra is a town and locality in the Australian state of South Australia. It is located on the Dukes Highway and Melbourne–Adelaide railway. , about 158 kilometres (98 mi) south-east of the state capital of Adelaide and about 77 kilometres (48 mi) south-east of the municipal seat of Tailem Bend.

"Culburra" is an indigenous name meaning "plenty of sand", and the settlement was previously called Dewson before the name was changed in the early 20th century.

The boundaries and the name for the locality were gazetted on 24 August 2000. The locality consists of land adjoining the southern boundary of the cadastral unit of the Hundred of Coneybeer and land from the following hundreds – the north-east corner of Colebatch, the south-west corner of Lewis and a portion on its northern boundary of Richards.

Culburra is located within the federal division of Barker, the state electoral district of Mackillop and the local government area of the Coorong District Council.
