= District Council of Karoonda =

District Council of Karoonda South Australia
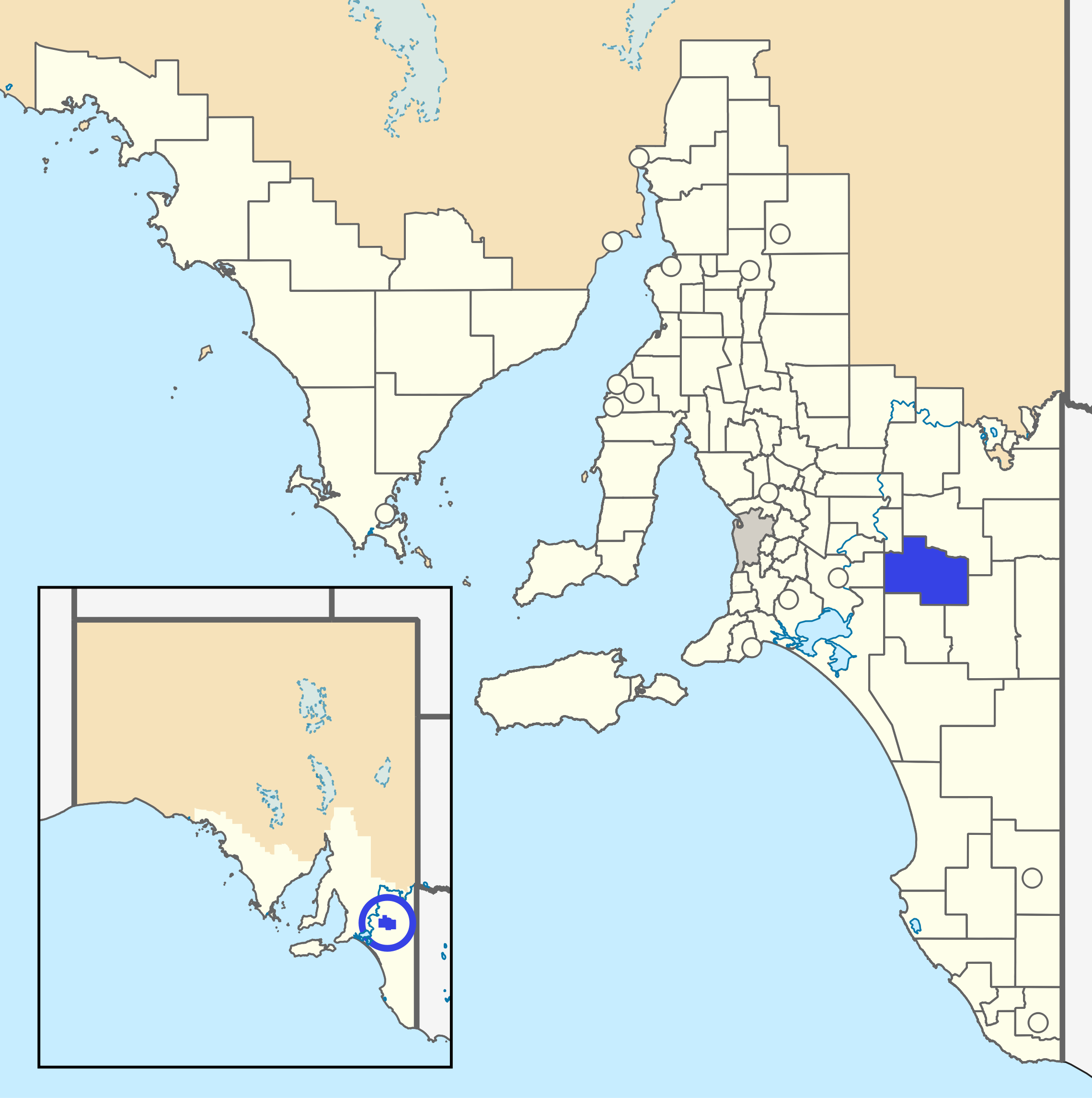
- The District Council of Karoonda as it was prior to disestablishment (blue)
- Coordinates: 35°05′40″S 139°53′45″E
- Established: 26 January 1922
- Abolished: 1979
- Council seat: Karoonda
LGAs around District Council of Karoonda:
Marne	Waikerie	Brown's Well
East Murray	Karoonda	Lameroo
Meningie	Peake	Lameroo

The District Council of Karoonda was a local government area in South Australia seated at Karoonda from 1922 until 1979.

The council was established about a decade after the township of Karoonda itself was founded on 26 January 1922. At the time of establishment the council district included the whole the hundreds of Hooper, Marmon Jabuk, Molineux and Vincent as well as southern portions of the hundreds of Wilson and McPherson, all being in the northern half of the County of Buccleuch.

Karoonda amalgamated with the District Council of East Murray in 1979 to form the new District Council of Karoonda East Murray.
