= Carcuma =

Carcuma may refer to:

- Carcuma, South Australia, a locality
- Carcuma Conservation Park, a protected area in South Australia
- Hundred of Carcuma, a cadastral unit in South Australia
