= Coonalpyn =

Coonalpyn may refer to:

- Coonalpyn, South Australia, a town and locality
- Coonalpyn Downs, the official name for the Ninety Mile Desert
- Coonalpyn Lutheran Church, a church in South Australia
- Coonalpyn Primary School - refer List of schools in South Australia

== See also ==
- District Council of Coonalpyn Downs
