= Meningie =

Meningie may refer to the following.

- Meningie, South Australia, a town and locality
- District Council of Meningie, a former local government area in South Australia

== See also ==
- Meningie East, South Australia
- Meningie West, South Australia
