= Buccleuch, South Australia =

Buccleuch Peake, South Australia
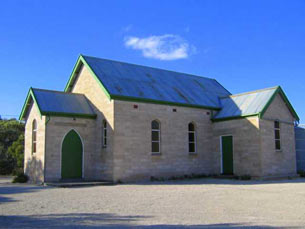
- Buccleuch Lutheran Church

- Coordinates: 35°20′06″S 139°52′39″E
- Elevation: 17 m (56 ft)(railway station)
- Time zone: ACST (UTC+9:30)
  - Summer (DST): ACDT (UTC+10:30)
- Location: 140 km (87 mi) E of Adelaide
- LGA(s): Coorong District Council
- State electorate(s): Hammond
- Federal division(s): Barker
Localities around Buccleuch:
	Wynarka
Sherlock	Buccleuch	Peake
	Yumali

Buccleuch is a place in South Australia situated along the Pinnaroo railway line and Mallee Highway (B12), approximately 140 km east of Adelaide. It is part of the Coorong District Council. There is an active Lutheran Church in Buccleuch.

== History ==
The town was named after the County of Buccleuch which in turn was named for the sixth Duke of Buccleuch, William Scott, of Scotland. A school was opened in 1921 and closed in 1942. There was a railway siding at Buccleuch, however it is no longer used. Buccleuch Post Office has been closed since 30 April 1986. Buccleuch is not to be used as an address location as it is incorporated into the bounded locality of Peake.
