= Tailem Bend–Keith pipeline =

- Pipeline follows the Dukes Highway around the Coomandook Saltland

Location
- Country: Australia
- State: South Australia
- Coordinates: 35.270°S 139.458°E
- Direction: southeast
- Start: Tailem Bend
- Passes through: Coomandook; Coonalpyn; Tintinara
- To: Keith
- Runs alongside: Dukes Highway, Adelaide–Wolseley railway line

General information
- Type: water
- Owner: SA Water
- Commissioned: 1969

Technical information
- Length: 132 km (82 mi)

The Tailem Bend–Keith pipeline provides treated water drawn from the Murray River to communities in the Upper South East region of South Australia. It extends 132 kilometres (82 mi) from Tailem Bend southeast to Keith. It runs roughly parallel to both the Dukes Highway and the Adelaide–Wolseley railway line. It services 800 kilometres (500 mi) of branch mains and a total area of 6,470 square kilometres (2,500 sq mi).

The pipeline was constructed by the South Australian government with financial assistance from the Australian government provided under the South Australia Grant (Tailem Bend to Keith Pipeline) Act 1969.

The storage facility at Coomandook was expanded in 2019 with the addition of a new 9 megalitres (2,000,000 imperial gallons) tank.
