= District Council of Peake =

District Council of Peake South Australia
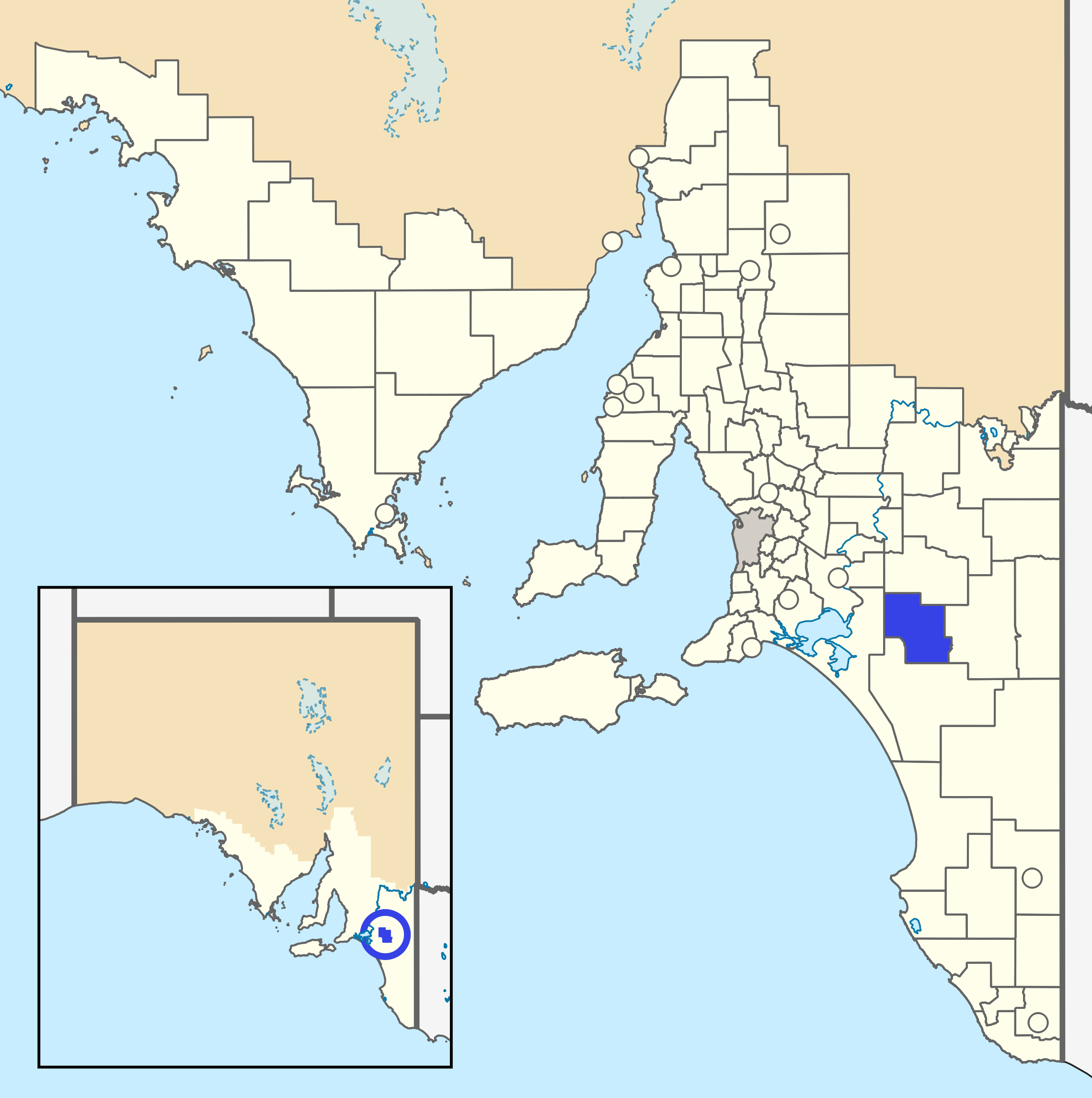
- The District Council of Peake as it was prior to disestablishment (blue)
- Coordinates: 35°21′51″S 139°57′13″E
- Population: 1,070 (1985)
  - Density: 0.5611/km^{2} (1.453/sq mi)
- Established: 1911
- Abolished: 1997
- Area: 1,906.8 km^{2} (736.2 sq mi)(1985)
- Council seat: Peake

The District Council of Peake was a local government area in the Australian state of South Australia that existed from 1911 to 1997 on land in the state’s south-east.

It was proclaimed on 16 November 1911 with its seat being located in the town of Peake.

At establishment, it consisted of the whole of the hundreds of Peake, Sherlock, Roby and Livingston.

At establishment, the district consisted of four wards whose names and boundaries were identical to the consistent hundreds and which were represented by two councillors each with the exception of Livingston Ward which were represented by one councillor.

On 13 February 1997, it was amalgamated with the district councils of Coonalpyn Downs and Meningie to create the Coorong District Council.

== Chairmen ==
The following persons were elected to serve as chairman of the council for the following terms:

1. W.G. Wilson, (1912 -?)
2. George Daniel Goodall (1927 - 1941)
3. Leslie Alick Williams (1941–46)
4. Albert William George Bald (1946–49)
5. David Lewellyn Bedggood Thompson (1949–69)
6. Leslie John Tynan (1969–71)
7. James Robert Cattle (1971–79)
8. Leslie John Tynan (1979–83)
9. Bernard James Cross (1983 - ?)

== See also ==
- Tauragat Well
