= Martin Mattner =

Australian rules footballer (born 1982)

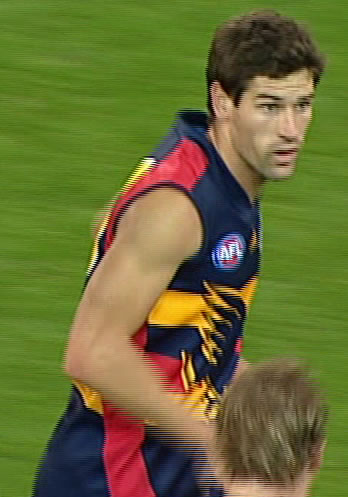

Personal information
- Full name: Martin Mattner
- Born: 6 August 1982 (age 44); Ki Ki, South Australia
- Original team: Sturt (SANFL)
- Height: 189 cm (6 ft 2 in)
- Weight: 86 kg (190 lb)
- Position: Defender

Playing career^{1}
Years	Club	Games (Goals)
2002–2007	Adelaide	98 (14)
2008–2013	Sydney	124 (26)
Total		222 (40)

Coaching career
Years	Club	Games (W–L–D)
2016–2018; 2021–	Sturt (SANFL)	64 (43-19-2)
- ^{1} Playing statistics correct to the end of 2013.

Career highlights
- AFL premiership player: 2012; SANFL premiership player: 2002; SANFL premiership coach: 2016, 2017, 2025

Martin Mattner (born 6 August 1982) is a former Australian rules footballer who played for the Adelaide Football Club and Sydney Swans in the Australian Football League (AFL). He was traded to Sydney from Adelaide in October 2007 in exchange for draft pick 28.

Mattner grew up in the small town of Ki Ki, 150 kilometres south-east of Adelaide. In the year he was elevated off Adelaide's rookie list (2002), he was having to travel up to Adelaide twice a week to train and play football for Sturt.

Mattner was Adelaide's leading tackler in the 2005 and 2006 seasons. In the 2006 season, he missed out on two games due to a calf injury.

Mattner retired midway through the 2013 AFL season, succumbing to an ongoing hip injury. He took up a coaching role with the Sydney Swans as a development coach until the end of the 2015 season. In October 2015, Mattner was announced as the head coach of Sturt. He is one of only a few to win a SANFL Premiership as a player, a SANFL Premiership as a coach and an AFL Premiership as a player.

== AFL career ==
Mattner grew up in the tiny southeast South Australian town of Ki Ki. He attended Coomandook Area School and played some junior football with the Peake and Districts Football Club. He then sought to further develop his game and progressed to play with the Imperial Football Club in 1997, and later Sturt, until he was recruited to the Adelaide Football Club for the 2002 season, off of the rookie list.

=== 2002–2003 ===
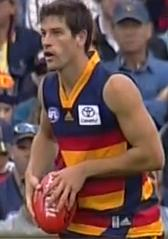
Mattner with the football

Debuting with Adelaide as a 19-year-old, Mattner began his career slowly. After being elevated from Adelaide's rookie list at the start of the 2002 season, he played just seven games for the year. One of his best performances was a game against Geelong where he laid 13 tackles, a feature of his game that he had become noted for. He picked up 11 disposals in his first game, and then 13 disposals in a win over St Kilda. He averaged eight disposals a match over his seven games, and had an impressive average of just over three tackles a game.

Much was the same the next year, with coach Gary Ayres displaying a tendency to not play his younger players unless a senior player was injured. He was able to play ten games in the 2003 season, averaging nine disposals a match, including 21 in a game against the Kangaroos, in the same game as he kicked his first goal.

Mattner during these two years was still young, and was playing well for his local SANFL club Sturt, regularly gathering 20 or more disposals a match as well as laying many bone-crunching tackles. In the 2002 SANFL season, the Double Blues won the premiership over Central District and Mattner was listed among the best players in the Grand Final. Sturt's end of season trip was to Bali. Team members were caught up in the 2002 Bali bombings and fellow player Josh Deegan and club official Bob Marshall were killed.

=== 2004–2005 ===
During the 2004 season, Mattner was seen to improve in a number of areas – averaging eleven disposals and playing 16 matches for the year. Midway through a disappointing season for the team (where the Crows missed the finals), new coach Neil Craig gave Mattner more opportunity than previous coach Ayres, which helped Mattner grow as a player, another feature becoming noticeable was his run through the midfield. His new coach also played him more through the wing than Gary Ayres did, giving him more opportunity as a player. At that time, he had a career equaling 21 disposals in a game against Melbourne, and failed to miss a match after his inclusion in round 7 which shows how well he was performing.

In 2005, Mattner came of age and so did a younger Crows outfit. He played all but one match for the season and failed only once to gather more than ten disposals in a disappointing effort against Melbourne. His average of 16 disposals per game seeing him as an important cog in Adelaide's midfield. He also had 98 tackles, which was the highest of any Crows player in the season. His long left-foot kicking, often described as "raking" and "accurate" by television commentators, was vital in setting up many of Adelaide's forward thrusts. He missed just one game in the season, which was in round 22, but failed to have a 15 disposal plus game in any of the Crows' three finals. Adelaide was knocked out of the finals race by West Coast in the preliminary final.

=== 2006 ===
In 2006, Mattner started to play on a half-back flank, keeping a smaller player relatively quiet and gaining many possessions of his own. This was suggested by former Crows coach Malcolm Blight, as he did with Andrew McLeod and Simon Goodwin in 1997 and 1998. At the end of the season, he had only missed out on two games due to a calf injury. He had a career high 27 disposals against St Kilda, and followed that performance with 25 disposals against Geelong playing on the likes of Gary Ablett and Jimmy Bartel. Also in the game against St Kilda, Mattner had a career high number of kicks and marks playing further in the midfield. He continued to play well during the season, picking up 21 disposals against Fremantle in round 19 and again against Melbourne three weeks later in round 22. He picked up 12 Brownlow Medal votes, beating the likes of veterans Simon Goodwin, Andrew McLeod and Mark Ricciuto. In the season, he only failed to pick up 10 disposals or more in a game three times (twice against eventual premiers West Coast), and failed to lay a tackle twice. He kicked five goals for the season, including a career high two goals in a game against the Bulldogs in round 5.

He has been praised by coach Neil Craig after he wanted him to take some parts of his game to a higher level. He is now considered an "automatic selection" player – that is, he will always get into the starting squad unless he is injured.

=== 2007 ===
Mattner managed 19 of 23 games for Adelaide in 2007, though his statistics were well down on previous years. Despite being a naturally attacking player, Mattner was consistently played in defence, rather than on a wing which would be his preferred position. This is often offered as an explanation to his drop in form, and subsequent trading away from the Crows.

=== 2008–2012 ===
Mattner was traded to the Sydney Swans at the end of the 2007 season and quickly found his feet in the Swans' backline. He had a terrific first year at his new club and consequently placed 3rd in the Bob Skilton Medal (Sydney's Best and Fairest Award) behind Jarrad McVeigh and Brett Kirk. His second game for the Swans was his 100th AFL game overall, played against Port Adelaide.

Mattner only missed one game in his time at the Sydney Swans, that being round 15, 2010 against North Melbourne.

Mattner played his 200th AFL game in round 9, 2012, against St Kilda. The milestone was overshadowed by Lenny Hayes playing his 250th AFL game for the Saints in the same match, as the Swans lost by 28 points. He went on to play in the Swans' side that won the club's fifth premiership with a victory over Hawthorn. He played an important role in the team, including a ferocious run down tackle on Hawthorn's Grant Birchall in the dying minutes.

=== 2013 ===
Mattner played the first seven rounds of the season in reasonable form however was sidelined for 3 rounds midway through the season. Just prior to round 11, Mattner announced his retirement effective immediately, due to a degenerative hip condition that had caused him constant pain for several years. Mattner stated that to continue playing football would aggravate the injury and could lead to a life of crippling pain.

== Coaching career ==
Mattner became the senior coach of Sturt in the South Australian National Football League (SANFL) in 2016. After finishing eighth out of ten in 2015, Sturt won the premiership in his first season as coach, and won its second consecutive premiership in 2017. Mattner joined the Adelaide Football Club post 2018 SANFL season with Sturt and took up an assistant role, Mattner will be in charge of the defenders with Adelaide. After departing Adelaide in 2020 due to reduction in coaching panel sizes, Mattner successfully returned as the coach of the Sturt Football Club in 2021.

== Statistics ==
Legend
G	Goals	K	Kicks	D	Disposals	T	Tackles
B	Behinds	H	Handballs	M	Marks

Season	Team	No.	Games	Totals							Averages (per game)						
Season	Team	No.	Games	G	B	K	H	D	M	T	G	B	K	H	D	M	T
2002	Adelaide	39	7	0	1	32	22	54	10	22	0.0	0.1	4.6	3.1	7.7	1.4	3.1
2003	Adelaide	39	10	1	2	51	38	89	17	26	0.1	0.2	5.1	3.8	8.9	1.7	2.6
2004	Adelaide	39	16	3	4	93	86	179	44	49	0.2	0.3	5.8	5.4	11.2	2.8	3.1
2005	Adelaide	39	24	4	9	194	188	382	80	98	0.2	0.4	8.1	7.8	15.9	3.3	4.1
2006	Adelaide	39	22	5	5	180	164	344	96	66	0.2	0.2	8.2	7.5	15.6	4.4	3.0
2007	Adelaide	39	19	1	2	143	148	291	83	44	0.1	0.1	7.5	7.8	15.3	4.4	2.3
2008	Sydney	29	24	4	6	257	190	447	108	116	0.2	0.3	10.7	7.9	18.6	4.5	4.8
2009	Sydney	29	22	12	3	209	154	363	90	95	0.5	0.1	9.5	7.0	16.5	4.1	4.3
2010	Sydney	29	23	6	2	232	153	385	93	64	0.3	0.1	10.1	6.7	16.7	4.0	2.8
2011	Sydney	29	24	3	1	206	120	326	77	106	0.1	0.0	8.6	5.0	13.6	3.2	4.4
2012	Sydney	29	24	1	3	205	122	327	81	74	0.0	0.1	8.5	5.1	13.6	3.4	3.1
2013	Sydney	29	7	0	0	49	27	76	23	19	0.0	0.0	7.0	3.9	10.9	3.3	2.7
Career			222	40	38	1851	1412	3263	802	779	0.2	0.2	8.3	6.4	14.7	3.6	3.5
