= District Council of Coonalpyn Downs =

- Local government area
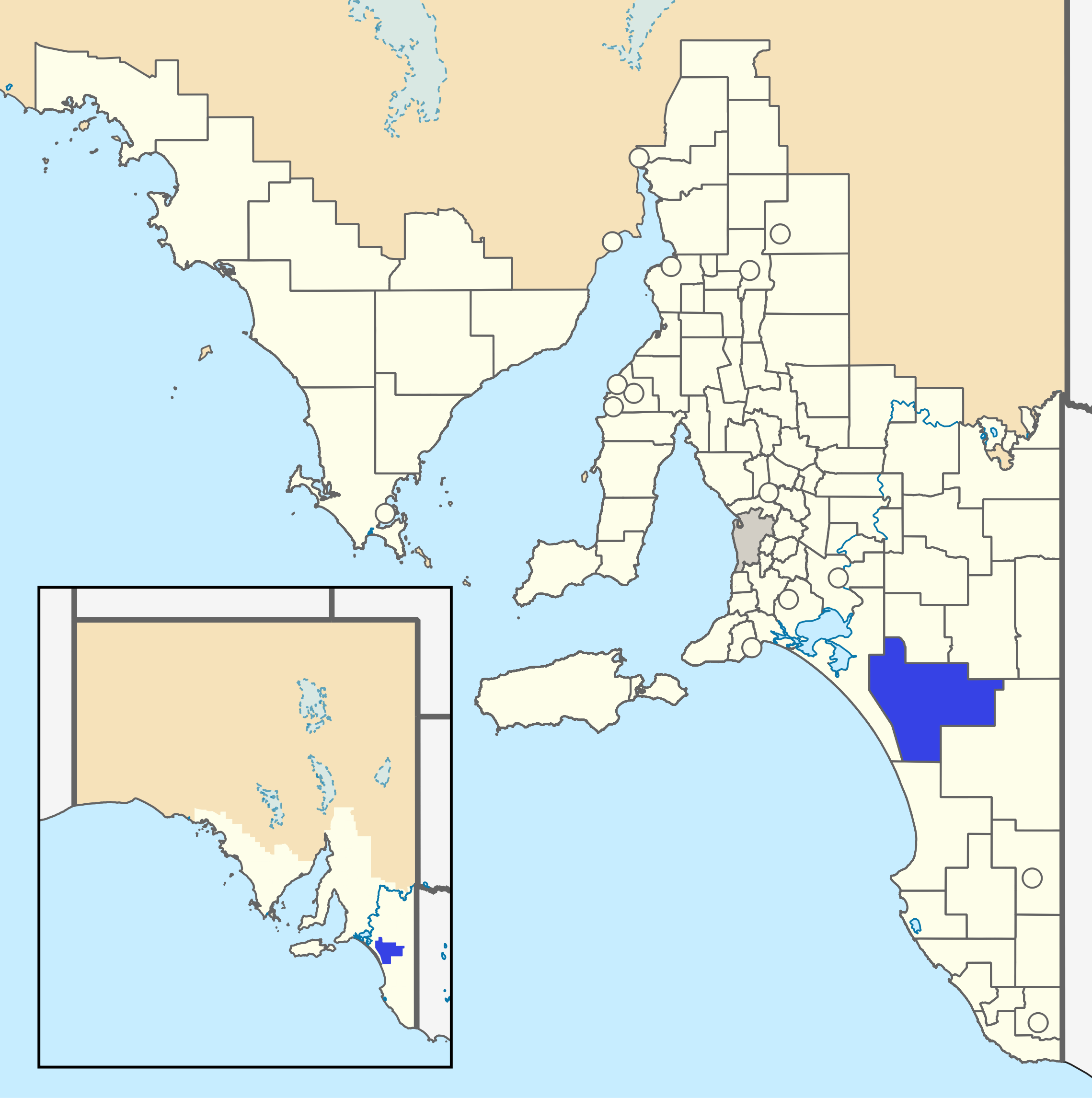
- The District Council of Coonalpyn Downs as it was prior to disestablishment (blue)
- Coordinates: 35°41′54″S 139°51′19″E
- Country: Australia
- State: South Australia
- Established: 1957
- Abolished: 1997
- Council seat: Coonalpyn

Area (1986)
  - Total: 4,061 km^{2} (1,568 sq mi)

Population
  - Total: 1,950 (1986)
  - Density: 0.4802/km^{2} (1.244/sq mi)

The District Council of Coonalpyn Downs was a local government area in the Australian state of South Australia that existed from 1957 to 1997 on land in the state’s south-east.

It was established on 30 May 1957 with its seat being located in the town of Coonalpyn.

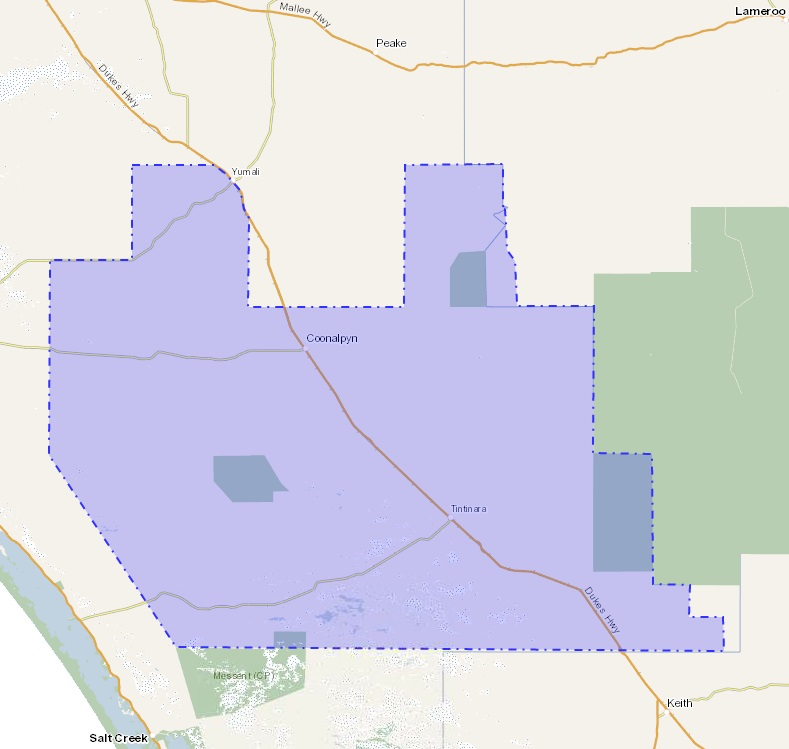
The District Council of Coonalpyn Downs as it was at establishment in 1957

At establishment, the district consisted of land in the hundreds of Jeffries, Strawbridge, Coneybeer, Lewis, Field, Colebatch, Richards and Coombe and parts of the hundreds of Archibald, Carcuma and Kirkpatrick. The district therefore included parts of the cadastral counties of Buccleuch, Russell, Cardwell and Buckingham.

At establishment, councillors were elected from the following five wards with all returning two councillors each with the exception of Yumali which returned one councillor – Coonalpyn, Mclntosh, Richards, Tintinara and Yumali.

On 13 February 1997, it was amalgamated with the district councils of Meningie and Peake to create the Coorong District Council.

== Chairmen ==
The following persons were elected to serve as chairman of the council for the following terms:

1. Hedley Ivan George Prosser (1957–59)
2. Malcolm Chisholm McIntosh (1959–61)
3. Hedley Ivan George Prosser (1961–65)
4. John Edgar Calvert (1965–68)
5. Eric Thomas Filmer (1968–70)
6. Glen Thomas Goodall (1970–72)
7. William Brownlow Ashby (1972–74)
8. Donald James Edmonds-Wilson (1974–76)
9. William Brownlow Ashby (1976–78)
10. Donald James Edmonds-Wilson (1978–80)
11. Albert George Webb (1980–82)
12. Glen Thomas Goodall (1982–85)
13. Pitre Julian Desmazures (1985–?)
