= Buccleuch =

Buccleuch may refer to:

== Places ==
=== Australia ===
- Buccleuch County, an administrative division in New South Wales, Australia
- Buccleuch, South Australia, a small locality and railway station
- County of Buccleuch, an administrative division in South Australia

=== Other countries ===
- Buccleuch (parish), a district of South Edinburgh, Scotland
- Buccleuch, Gauteng, a suburb of Sandton, South Africa
- Buccleuch, Scottish Borders, a village in Scotland

== Other uses ==
- Duke of Buccleuch, a title in the Peerage of Scotland

== See also ==
- Buccleuch Mansion, a historic house museum within Buccleuch Park in New Brunswick, New Jersey
