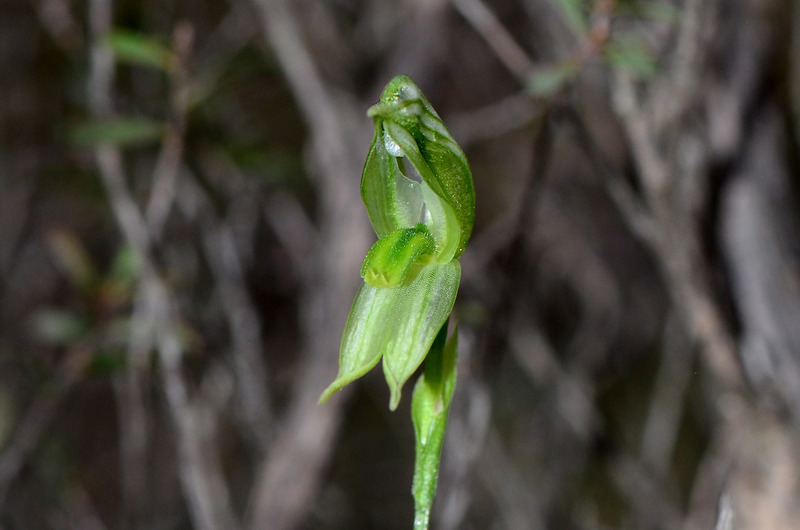
- In Little Desert National Park

Scientific classification
- Kingdom: Plantae
- Clade: Tracheophytes
- Clade: Angiosperms
- Clade: Monocots
- Order: Asparagales
- Family: Orchidaceae
- Subfamily: Orchidoideae
- Tribe: Cranichideae
- Genus: Pterostylis
- Species: P. prasina

Binomial name
- Pterostylis prasina (D.L.Jones) G.N.Backh.

Synonyms
- Bunochilus prasinus D.L.Jones

= Pterostylis prasina =

Mallee leafy greenhood

Species of orchid

Pterostylis prasina, commonly known as mallee leafy greenhood, is a plant in the orchid family Orchidaceae and is endemic to southern continental Australia. Plants that are not in flower have a rosette of leaves on a short stalk, but flowering plants lack the rosette and have up to eight pale green and translucent green flowers with darker green lines. The flowers have a pale green labellum with a darker central line. It is a common and widespread greenhood in parts of Victoria and South Australia.

== Description ==
Pterostylis prasina, is a terrestrial, perennial, deciduous, herb with an underground tuber. Non-flowering plants have a rosette of between three and five dark green, egg-shaped to lance-shaped leaves which are 7–50 mm (0.3–2 in) long and 4–15 mm (0.2–0.6 in) wide on a thin stalk 20–50 mm (0.8–2 in) long. Flowering plants lack a rosette and have up to eight or more pale green and translucent green flowers with darker green lines on a flowering stem 70–500 mm (3–20 in) high. The flowers are 9–12 mm (0.4–0.5 in) long and 4–6 mm (0.16–0.24 in) wide. The flowering stem has four to seven dark green, egg-shaped to lance-shaped leaves which are 10–60 mm (0.4–2 in) long and 3–9 mm (0.1–0.4 in) wide. The dorsal sepal and petals are fused, forming a hood or "galea" over the column with the dorsal sepal having a short brownish tip on its end. The lateral sepals turn downwards and are 9–15 mm (0.4–0.6 in) long, 4–6 mm (0.2–0.2 in) wide, joined for part of their length and have brownish tips. The labellum is 5–7 mm (0.20–0.28 in) long, about 2 mm (0.08 in) wide and light green with a darker green mid-line and a mound near its base. Flowering occurs from July to September.

== Taxonomy and naming ==
Mallee leafy greenhood was first formally described in 2006 by David Jones who gave it the name Bunochilus prasinus and published the description in Australian Orchid Research from a specimen collected near Sherlock. In 2007 Gary Backhouse changed the name to Pterostylis prasina. The specific epithet (prasina) is a Latin word meaning "green" or "leek-green", referring to the colour of the flowers.

== Distribution and habitat ==
Pterostylis prasina is common and widespread in the Little Desert and Big Desert areas of Victoria and the Murray, Yorke Peninsula, South Eastern and possibly Eyre Peninsula botanical regions of South Australia. It grows in plant litter under shrubs and small trees in sandy soil.
