= Carcuma Conservation Park =

Protected area in South Australia

- IUCN category Ia (strict nature reserve)
- Location within South Australia
- Location: South Australia, Carcuma
- Nearest city: Coonalpyn
- Coordinates: 35°37′11″S 140°04′54″E
- Area: 29.27 km^{2} (11.30 sq mi)
- Established: 28 August 1969
- Governing body: Department for Environment and Water

Carcuma Conservation Park (formerly Carcuma National Park) is a protected area located in the Australian state of South Australia in the locality of Carcuma about 155 kilometres (96 mi) south-east of the state capital of Adelaide and about 22 kilometres (14 mi) north-east of the town of Coonalpyn.

The conservation park consists of crown land in section 23 of the cadastral unit of the Hundred of Carcuma. It acquired protected area status as the Carcuma National Park on 28 August 1969 by proclamation under the National Parks Act 1966. On 27 April 1972, it was reconstituted as the Carcuma Conservation Park upon the proclamation of the National Parks and Wildlife Act 1972. As of 2016, it covered an area of 35.90 square kilometres (13.86 sq mi).

In 1980, it was described as follows:

Carcuma is a moderately large park featuring mallee heath vegetation representative of the original vegetation which once covered much of the region. The park displays a wide diversity of flora and fauna. Carcuma Conservation Park is situated on an undulating plain featuring large stabilized sand ridges and numerous small depressions. The dominant vegetation associations are Banksia ornata / Casuarina sp / Xanthorrhoea australis open heath with Eucalyptus incrassata mallee scrub. Discrete areas of E. leucoxylon and E. baxteri open forest are found in depressions and on the lee side of dunes respectively. This park is in a relatively undisturbed condition with cultural and disturbed natural surrounds. Access is limited to 4-wheel drive vehicles. This and its size affords added protection from disturbance.

The conservation park is classified as an IUCN Category Ia protected area. In 1980, it was listed on the now-defunct Register of the National Estate.

== See also ==
- Protected areas of South Australia
