= Tauragat Well =

- Plaque commemorating the Centenary of the well & trough
- Interactive map of the Tauragat Well area

General information
- Type: water well
- Location: Coonalpyn, South Australia, Coonalpyn-Lameroo Road, Coonalpyn
- Coordinates: 35°36′56″S 139°58′06″E
- Construction started: 1876

Tauragat Well is a disused well in the Australian state of South Australia located in the locality of Coonalpyn along the Coonalpyn-Lameroo Road approximately 12 kilometres (7.5 mi) north east of the locality's town centre.

The well was built in 1876 on land in what is now section 48 of the cadastral unit of the Hundred of Livingston to water stock on route either to the greater South East or up north east to the Mallee.

The land of an area of 10 acres (4.0 ha) around the well was surveyed in July 1909 and was later dedicated as a water conservation reserve in 1911.

In 1931, the reserve was transferred to the control of the District Council of Peake.

A plaque was unveiled in 1976, on its centenary by J.R.Cattle, the chairman of the District Council of Peake.

In 1986, the well was described as one of the two "most significant tourist attractions' located within the District Council of Peake.

Prior to 1998, the land is reported as being transferred to the National Trust of South Australia.

In the years 1997 and 1998, it was one of the subjects of a survey of European heritage located in the Murray Mallee carried out on behalf of the Government of South Australia where it was described as "an important reminder of the dependence upon ground water in opening up the district for farming."

The well shares its name with Tauragat Hill, a hill of 65 metres (213 ft) height which adjoins the alignment of the Coonalpyn-Lameroo Road to the well's immediate north and which has a trig point at its summit.

== Photo gallery ==
Tauragat Well sign

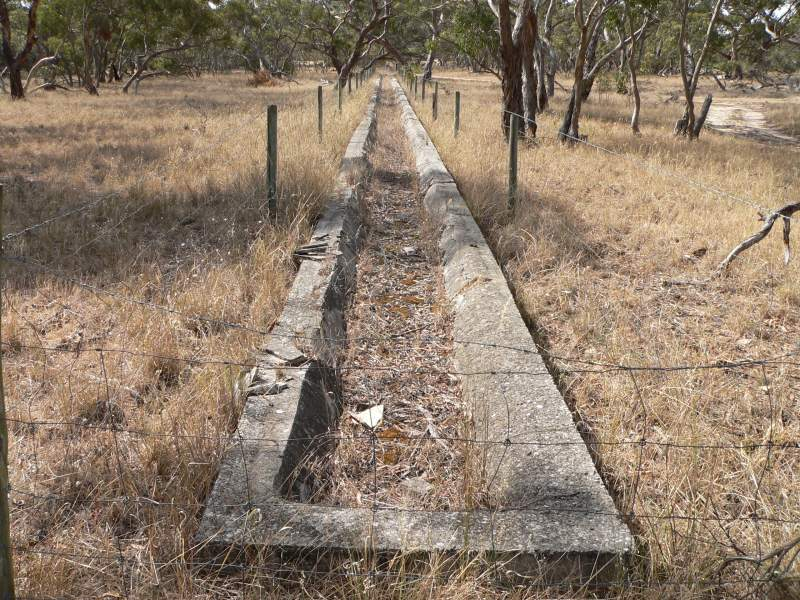
Trough at Tauragat Well

Tauragat Well windmill

Trig point on Tauragat Hill
