= Jabuk, South Australia =

Jabuk
- Town
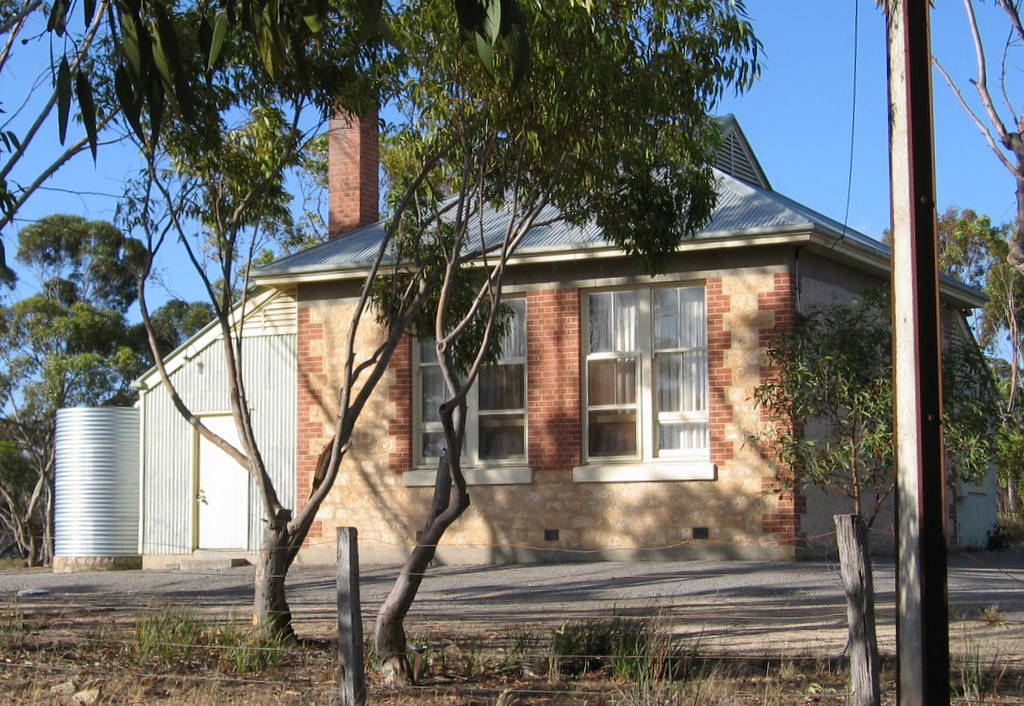
- Former Jabuk school building

- Coordinates: 35°23′11″S 140°04′07″E
- Country: Australia
- State: South Australia
- Region: Murray and Mallee
- LGAs: Coorong District Council; Southern Mallee District Council
- Location: 142 km (88 mi) SE of Adelaide; 58 km (36 mi) E of Tailem Bend; 78 km (48 mi) W of Pinnaroo
- Established: by 1908 (private town); 2 August 1999 (locality)

Government
  - State electorate: Hammond
  - Federal division: Barker
- Elevation (railway station): 84 m (276 ft)

Population
  - Total: 56 (SAL 2021)
- Time zone: UTC+9:30 (ACST)
  - Summer (DST): UTC+10:30 (ACDT)
- Postcode: 5301
- County: Buccleuch
- Mean max temp: 23.6 °C (74.5 °F)
- Mean min temp: 9.3 °C (48.7 °F)
- Annual rainfall: 343.0 mm (13.50 in)
Localities around Jabuk
| Karoonda | Karoonda; Marama | Marama |
| Peake; Netherton | Jabuk | Geranium |
| Netherton | Carcuma | Geranium |
- Locations; Adjoining localities

Jabuk (formerly Marmon Jabuk) is a locality in the Australian state of South Australia located about 142 kilometres (88 mi) south-east of the state capital of Adelaide and respectively about 78 kilometres (48 mi) west and 58 kilometres (36 mi) east of the municipal seats of Pinnaroo and Tailem Bend.

It began originally by 1908 as a private subdivision of section 5 in the cadastral unit of the Hundred of Peake by a local landowner known as "Mr.Cross of Wellington". In several sources, it has been described as a private town. The name was officially altered from Marmon Jabuk to Jabuk on 20 February 1941. Boundaries for the locality were created on 12 August 1999 for the portion within the Southern Mallee District Council and on 24 August 2000 for the portion within the Coorong District Council.

The name appears to be derived from the nearby Marmon Jabuk Range, but the origin of that name is unclear. It could be named from an Afghan word by a cameleer, or from a local Aboriginal word.

The 'private town' is located in the approximate centre of the locality with the Mallee Highway to its north and the Pinnaroo railway line to its south.

There is also a war memorial, institute, football oval, tennis courts with lights and a play ground. Jabuk has a tennis club with a senior section. The football oval is no longer in use, and now farmed, and its clubrooms are used by the Jabuk tennis team. The Epiphany Lutheran Church, the foundation stone being laid on 7 February 1960, has long been closed. There is also a Baptist church which is no longer in use.

Jabuk is located within the federal division of Barker, the state electoral district of Hammond and the local government areas of the Coorong District Council and the Southern Mallee District Council.
