= Netherton, South Australia =

Netherton South Australia
- Coordinates: 35°28′36″S 139°56′46″E
- Established: 24 August 2000
- Postcode(s): 5301
- Time zone: ACST (UTC+9:30)
  - Summer (DST): ACST (UTC+10:30)
- Location: 137 km (85 mi) SE of Adelaide; 50 km (31 mi) SE of Tailem Bend
- LGA(s): Coorong District Council
- Region: Murray and Mallee
- County: Buccleuch
- State electorate(s): Hammond
- Federal division(s): Barker
Mean max temp	Mean min temp	Annual rainfall
23.6 °C; 74 °F	9.2 °C; 49 °F	341.5 mm 13.4 in
Suburbs around Netherton:
Peake	Peake	Jabuk
Yumali; Ki Ki	Netherton	Jabuk; Carcuma
Ki Ki	Ki Ki; Coonalpyn; Carcuma	Carcuma
- Footnotes: Locations; Adjoining localities

Netherton is a locality in the Australian state of South Australia, located about 137 kilometres (85 mi) south-east of the state capital of Adelaide and about 50 kilometres (31 mi) south-east of the municipal seat in Tailem Bend.

Netherton’s boundaries were created on 24 August 2000 and given the “local established name” which is derived from the maiden name of the wife of Mr. J. Cattle, an early landowner in the cadastral unit of the Hundred of Peake. Netherton was first used as the name of a post office located on section 34 of the Hundred of Peake, which operated from 15 January 1915 to 31 October 1969. It is located on land at the junction of the hundred of Peake in the north, Livingston in the west and Carcuma in the east.

Land use within the locality is ’primary production’.

Netherton is located within the federal division of Barker, the state electoral district of Hammond and the local government area of the Coorong District Council.
