= Marama, South Australia =

Marama South Australia
- Coordinates: 35°10′32″S 140°10′49″E
- Population: 51 (SAL 2021)
- Established: 23 August 1917 (town); 11 November 1999 (locality)
- Postcode(s): 5307
- Time zone: ACST (UTC+9:30)
  - Summer (DST): ACDT (UTC+10:30)
- Location: 146 km (91 mi) E of Adelaide; 28 km (17 mi) E of Karoonda
- LGA(s): District Council of Karoonda East Murray
- Region: Murray and Mallee
- County: Buccleuch
- State electorate(s): Hammond
- Federal division(s): Barker
Mean max temp	Mean min temp	Annual rainfall
23.6 °C; 74 °F	9.3 °C; 49 °F	343.0 mm 13.5 in
Localities around Marama:
Borrika	Borrika; Sandalwood	Sandalwood
Karoonda	Marama	Sandalwood; Lameroo; Parrakie
Jabuk	Jabuk; Geranium; Parrakie	Parrakie
- Footnotes: Locations; Adjoining localities

Marama is a township and locality in the Australian state of South Australia located in the state's south-east about 146 kilometres (91 mi) east of the state capital of Adelaide and about 28 kilometres (17 mi) east of the municipal seat of Karoonda. It was established in December 1914 as a station on the Peebinga railway line, which was closed in 1990.

The government town of Marama was proclaimed on 23 August 1917 on land in the cadastral unit of the Hundred of Molineux located to the immediate south of the Marama railway station, which had been constructed almost 2 years beforehand. The name, the same as that of the station, derived from an Aboriginal word meaning "black duck". The locality's boundaries, which were created on 11 November 1999, include the site of the government town, located in its approximate centre.

The town is on the Karoonda to Lameroo road. Only a memorial hall, post office and automated telephone exchange remain.

Marama is located within the federal division of Barker, the state electoral district of Hammond and the local government area of the District Council of Karoonda East Murray.
