= Carcuma, South Australia =

Carcuma South Australia
- Coordinates: 35°34′23″S 140°04′23″E
- Established: 24 August 2000
- Postcode(s): 5301
- Time zone: ACST (UTC+9:30)
  - Summer (DST): ACST (UTC+10:30)
- Location: 150 km (93 mi) SE of Adelaide; 67 km (42 mi) SE of Tailem Bend
- LGA(s): Coorong District Council
- Region: Murray and Mallee
- County: Buccleuch
- State electorate(s): Hammond
- Federal division(s): Barker
Mean max temp	Mean min temp	Annual rainfall
23.4 °C; 74 °F	8.8 °C; 48 °F	313.0 mm 12.3 in
Suburbs around Carcuma:
Netherton	Jabuk	Geranium
Netherton; Coonalpyn	Carcuma	Geranium
Coonalpyn	Coonalpyn	Coonalpyn
- Footnotes: Locations; Adjoining localities

Carcuma is a locality in the Australian state of South Australia located about 150 kilometres (93 mi) south-east of the state capital of Adelaide and about 67 kilometres (42 mi) south-east of the municipal seat in Tailem Bend.

Carcuma ’s boundaries were created on 24 August 2000 and given the “local established name” which is derived from either the pastoral property known as the “Carcuma Run“ or the cadastral unit of the Hundred of Carcuma. Its boundaries do not include the place of the same name which is located to the west of the locality within the Hundred of Livingston and which is gazetted as an “unbounded locality”.

Land use within the locality is divided between ’primary production’ in its north and conservation in its south over the area proclaimed as the Carcuma Conservation Park.

Carcuma is located within the federal division of Barker, the state electoral district of Hammond and the local government area of the Coorong District Council.
