= Hundred of Lewis =

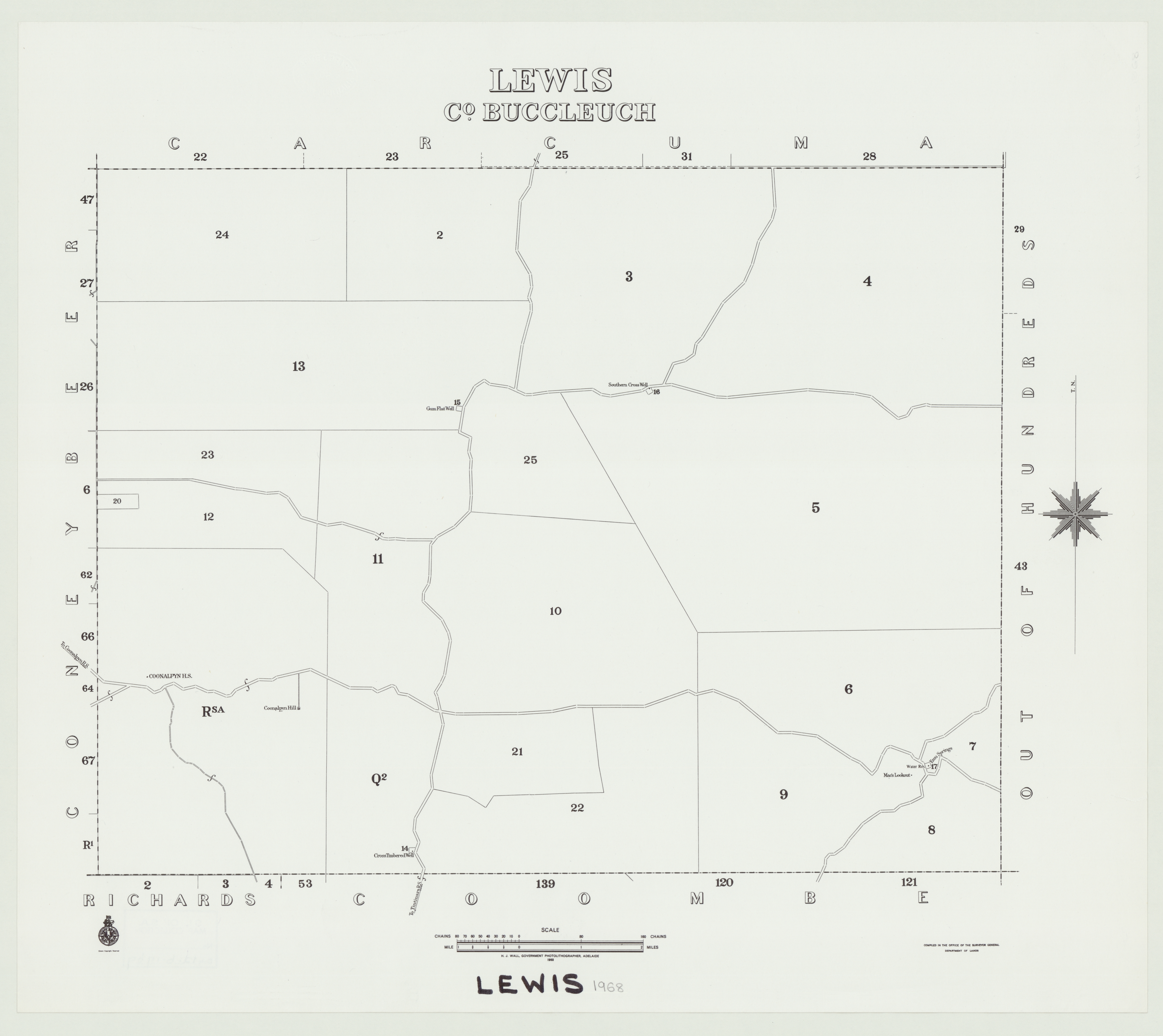
Hundred of Lewis, 1968

The Hundred of Lewis is a hundred and a locality within County of Buccleuch, South Australia.

The main town of the hundred is Coonalpyn and Tintinara, South Australia.
