= Hundred of Coneybeer =

The Hundred of Coneybeer is a hundred within County of Buccleuch, South Australia.

The main town of the hundred is Coonalpyn and the traditional owners are the Ngargad people.
