= Yumali, South Australia =

Yumali South Australia
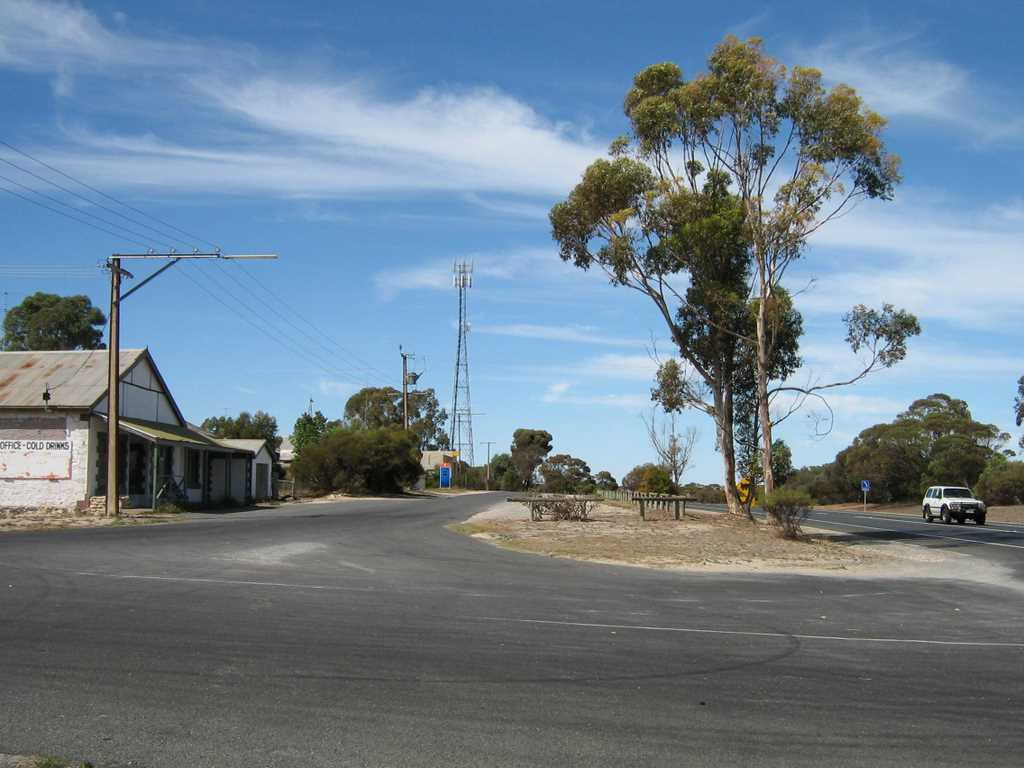
- Main Street of Yumali - old General Store, Yumali Garage, payphone & Telstra tower

- Coordinates: 35°30′36″S 139°45′23″E
- Population: 60 (SAL 2021)
- Established: 24 August 2000
- Location: 137 km (85 mi) SE of Adelaide via
- LGA(s): The Coorong District Council
- Region: Murray and Mallee
- County: Buccleuch
- State electorate(s): Hammond
- Federal division(s): Barker
| Mean max temp | Mean min temp | Annual rainfall |
| 22.5 °C; 73 °F | 9.6 °C; 49 °F | 373.6 mm 14.7 in |
Localities around Yumali:
| Coomandook | Coomandook; Sherlock | Peake |
| Malinong; Meningie East | Yumali | Netherton; Ki Ki |
| Meningie East | Ki Ki; Coonalpyn | Ki Ki |
- Footnotes: Adjoining localities

Yumali is a town in South Australia 162 km (100 miles) southeast of Adelaide on the Dukes Highway (A8). Yumali belongs to The Coorong District Council and is in the State electorate of Hammond and the Federal electorate of Barker. Yumali is in the County of Buccleuch.

Yumali is an aboriginal word meaning "the great land", before that it was known as Wahpunyah Siding. Yumali is situated 100 miles from Adelaide on the Adelaide to Melbourne Express route. Bore water was used to water the community, surrounding farms and Coomandook in 1915, but ceased when the River Murray pipeline was accessible in 1971.

There are tennis courts that still have an active tennis club belonging to the 'Border-Downs Tennis Association'. There is also an old football clubrooms from when Yumali had a team.

The town hall was opened in 1960.

The newly bitumised Tynan Road (Yumali-Sherlock) and then Kulkawarra Rd (Sherlock-Karoonda) gives a more comfortable drive for those traveling between Karoonda and the upper South East and vice versa.
