= Coonalpyn Lutheran Church =

- Coonalpyn Redeemer Lutheran Church
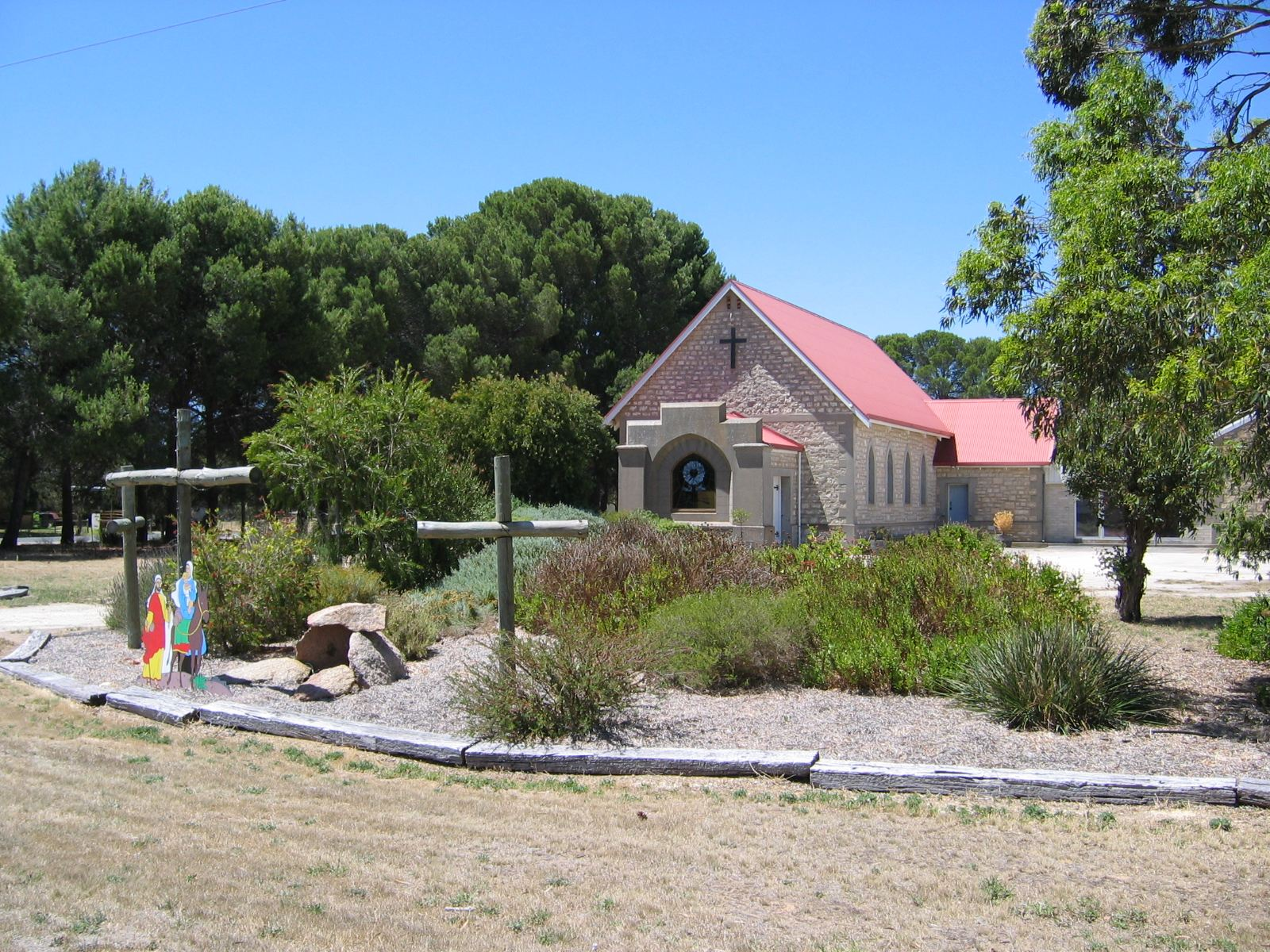
- View of the church from the Dukes Highway
- Coonalpyn Lutheran Church
- 35°41′58″S 139°51′36″E
- Location: Coonalpyn, South Australia
- Country: Australia
- Denomination: Lutheran
- Website: www.coonalpynlutheranparish.com.au

Architecture
- Years built: 1950s

Coonalpyn Lutheran Church (also called Coonalpyn Redeemer Lutheran Church) is a Lutheran church in the Australian state of South Australia located in Coonalpyn. It is reported as being the largest church in the Coonalpyn Lutheran Parish which has congregations in Tintinara and Meningie. Built in 1953, it was the first Lutheran church in Australia to have both Evangelical Lutheran Church in Australia (ELCA) and United Evangelical Lutheran Church of Australia (UELCA) congregations worship in the same building before the two Synods amalgamated in 1966.

== Stained glass window ==
The stained glass in the Narthex contains in its centre, the Luther rose. Below, sheafs of wheat and a lamb. Also, the symbols , Greek for Jesus Christ, conquers (or victorious).

Building of the Coonalpyn Lutheran Church in the 1950s

The church's altar

Church's stained glass window in the narthex

== See also ==
- Lutheran Church of Australia
