= Hundred of Vincent =

Vincent
- Cadastral division
- Coordinates: 34.97°S 139.84°E
- Country: Australia
- State: South Australia
- Established: 1898
- County: Buccleuch

The Hundred of Vincent, South Australia is a hundred of the County of Buccleuch. west of Lake Alexandrina. The Hundred was founded in 1898, and is located at -34.973079681n and 139.844161987e, and the principal town of the hundred is Perponda, South Australia.
