= Meningie East, South Australia =

Meningie East South Australia
- Coordinates: 35°38′03″S 139°33′34″E
- Established: 24 August 2000
- Postcode(s): 5264
- Time zone: ACST (UTC+9:30)
  - Summer (DST): ACST (UTC+10:30)
- Location: 120 km (75 mi) SE of Adelaide; 43 km (27 mi) SE of Tailem Bend
- LGA(s): Coorong District Council
- Region: Murray and Mallee
- County: Russell
- State electorate(s): Mackillop
- Federal division(s): Barker
Mean max temp	Mean min temp	Annual rainfall
20.9 °C; 70 °F	10.3 °C; 51 °F	469.0 mm 18.5 in
Suburbs around Meningie East:
Malinong	Malinong	Yumali
Ashville; Waltowa; Meningie	Meningie East	Yumali; Coonalpyn
Meningie	Field	Field
- Footnotes: Locations; Adjoining localities

Meningie East is a locality in the Australian state of South Australia located about 120 kilometres (75 mi) south-east of the state capital of Adelaide and about 43 kilometres (27 mi) south-east of the municipal seat in Tailem Bend.

Meningie East ’s boundaries were created on 24 August 2000 and given the “local established name”. Its southern boundary is the McIntosh Way, a sealed road connecting the towns of Meningie and Coonalpyn and which is maintained by the Government of South Australia.

Land use within the locality is ’primary production’.

Meningie East is located within the federal division of Barker, the state electoral district of Mackillop and the local government area of the Coorong District Council.
