= Geranium, South Australia =

Geranium South Australia
- Coordinates: 35°22′57″S 140°09′36″E
- Population: 83 (SAL 2021)
- Established: 24 March 1910 (town); 12 August 1999 (locality)
- Postcode(s): 5301
- Time zone: ACST (UTC+9:30)
  - Summer (DST): ACST (UTC+10:30)
- LGA(s): Southern Mallee District Council
- Region: Murray and Mallee
- County: Chandos
- State electorate(s): Chaffey
- Federal division(s): Barker
Localities around Geranium:
Marama	Marama	Marama
Jabuk; Carcuma	Geranium	Parrakie
Coonalpyn	Coonalpyn; Tintinara	Tintinara
- Footnotes: Adjoining localities

Geranium is a town and locality in the Murray Mallee region of South Australia near the Mallee Highway. At the 2006 census, Geranium had a population of 240. It was surveyed in 1910 as the town supporting a station on the Pinnaroo railway line. The name is derived from a native plant prolific in the area.
