= Peake, South Australia =

Peake South Australia
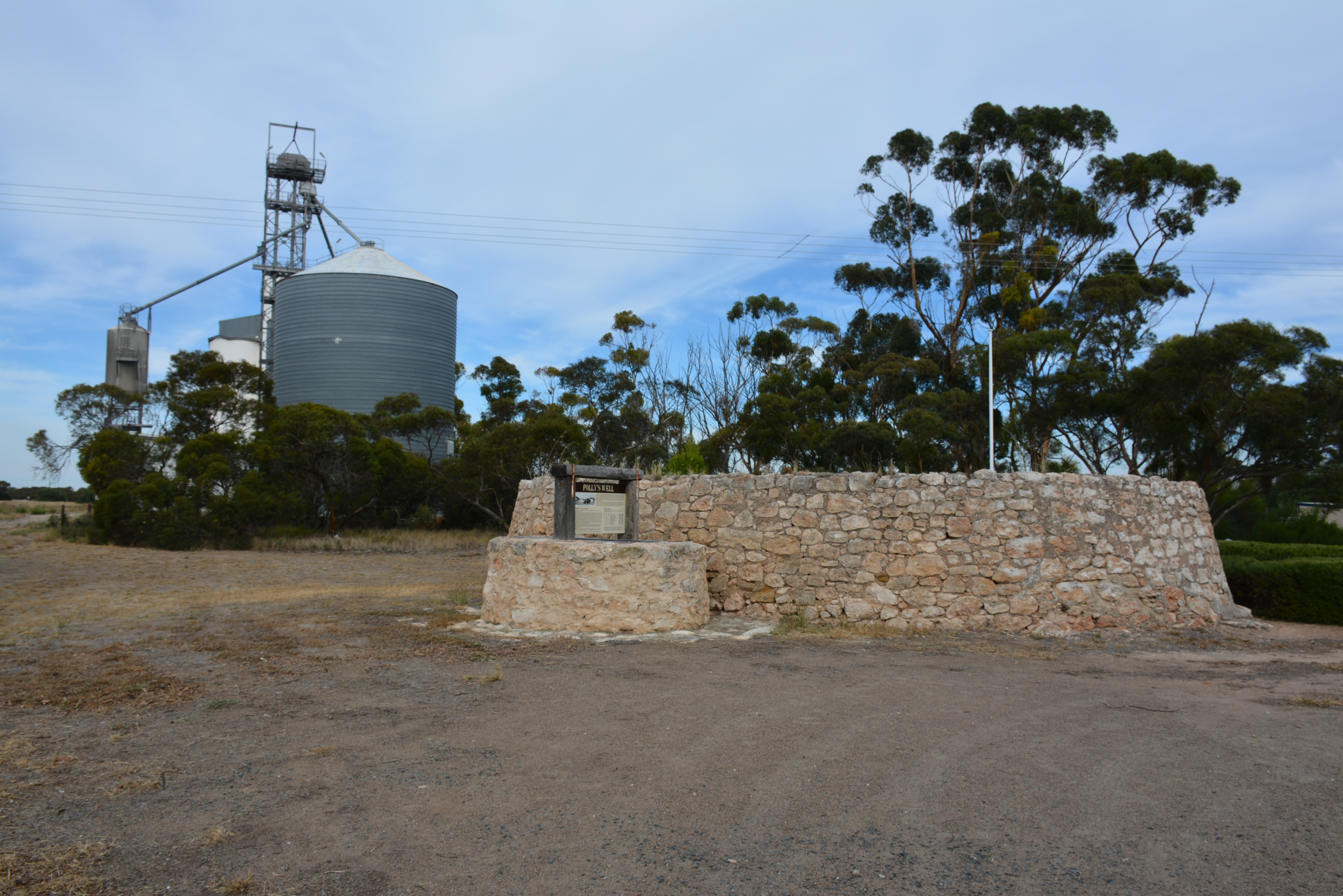
- Polly's Well, at Peake

- Coordinates: 35°21′S 139°57′E
- Population: 104 (SAL 2021)
- Established: 8 August 1907 (town); 24 August 2000 (locality)
- Postcode(s): 5301
- Elevation: 24 m (79 ft)
- Time zone: ACST (UTC+9:30)
  - Summer (DST): ACDT (UTC+10:30)
- LGA(s): Coorong District Council
- Region: Murray and Mallee
- County: Buccleuch
- State electorate(s): Hammond
- Federal division(s): Barker
Mean max temp	Mean min temp	Annual rainfall
23.6 °C; 74 °F	9.2 °C; 49 °F	341.5 mm 13.4 in
Localities around Peake:
Sherlock	Sherlock; Karoonda	Karoonda
Sherlock	Peake	Jabuk
Yumali; Yumali	Yumali; Netherton	Jabuk
- Footnotes: Adjoining localities

Peake is a town and locality in the Australian state of South Australia situated along the Mallee Highway (B12), approximately 150 kilometres (93 mi) east of the state capital of Adelaide.

== History ==
The town of Peake was proclaimed on 8 August 1907. It was surveyed during May 1907 and its name is derived from the cadastral unit of the Hundred of Peake which itself is derived from Archibald Henry Peake, a South Australian politician who served three terms as the Premier of South Australia.

Along the Pinnaroo railway line, one of the major railway lines of the time, many settlers and travelers passed along the route.

The town of Peake was the seat for the District Council of Peake which was established on 16 November 1911. In 1997, the district council was amalgamated with the District Council of Coonalpyn Downs and the District Council of Meningie to form the Coorong District Council.

Boundaries for the locality of Peake were created on 24 August 2000.

== Peake Historical Walk ==
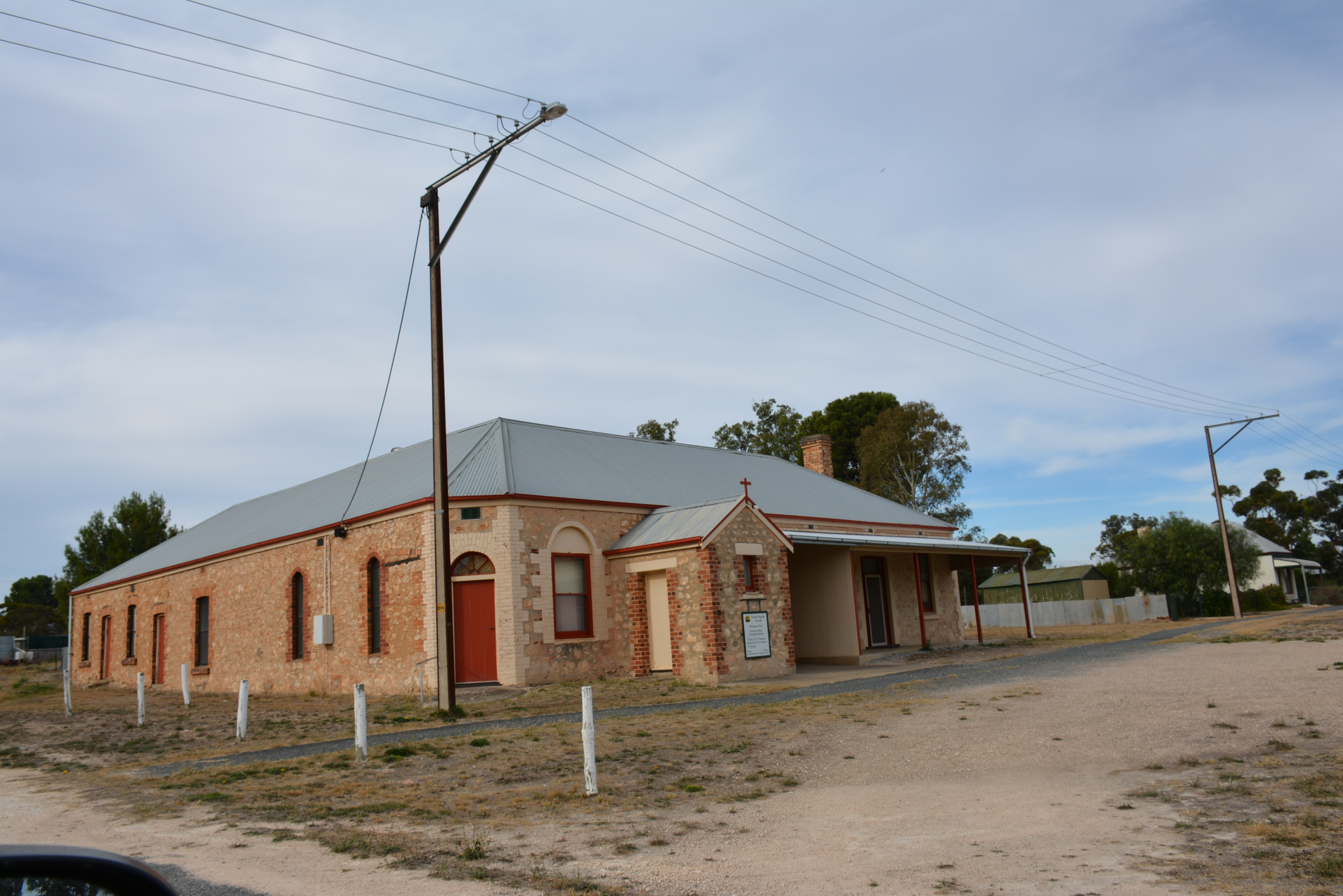
The Baptist Church, and former bakery, at Peake

A walk established for visitors to show the historic landmarks of Peake. The relatively short walk takes highlights all of the first facilities built when the town was settled in the 1900s.

The first historical landmark is Polly's Well which is located next to the rest stop. Polly's Well was sunk in 1877 and supplied the whole town with water. The next stop on the walk is the old Station Masters house which was built in 1912. The last station master died in the house and was found weeks later. Next there is the Peake store (built 1937) which is now used as the Tavern. The other historic facilities that are still being used to this day are the Post Office (1912) and the Bakehouse/Church (1908). The final landmarks include Peake School (1929), Butcher Shop (1900s), Saddlery (1912) and the town Garage which was used from 1956 to 1974.

Pamphlets are available at the rest stop opposite the town oval.

== Events ==
A Christian youth music festival, Silos 07, organised by former residents of Peake and the local Baptist church, was held in early March 2007 at the local football ground. Following the success of this event, Silos 08 was held on 11 October 2008, featuring Matt Corby and Fatis Valor as the headline artists. The town population grows by 10 fold during the festival.
