= Coorong District Council =

Coordinates: 35°41′16″S 139°20′17″E

- Local government area
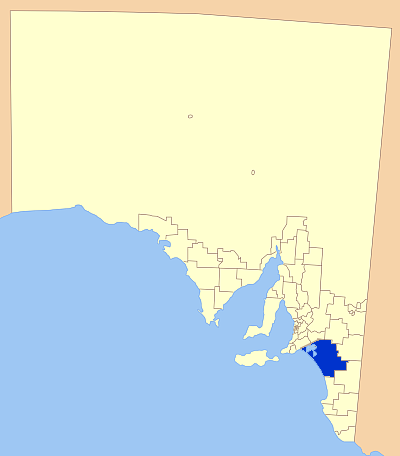
- Location of the Coorong District Council

- Interactive map of Coorong District Council
- Country: Australia
- State: South Australia
- Region: Murray and Mallee
- Established: 3 May 1997
- Council seat: Tailem Bend

Government
  - Mayor: Paul Simmons
  - State electorate: Hammond, MacKillop
  - Federal division: Barker

Area
  - Total: 8,830.6 km^{2} (3,409.5 sq mi)

Population
  - Total: 5,463 (LGA 2021)
  - Density: 0.62/km^{2} (1.6/sq mi)
- Website: Coorong District Council
LGAs around Coorong District Council
Alexandrina; Murray Bridge	Karoonda East Murray	Southern Mallee
Great Australian Bight	Coorong District Council	Southern Mallee
Great Australian Bight	Kingston	Tatiara

Former District Council of Coonalpyn Downs' logo

Coorong District Council is a local government area in South Australia located between the River Murray and the Limestone Coast region. The district covers mostly rural areas with small townships, as well as part of the Coorong National Park.

The council was formed in May 1997 with the amalgamation of the District Council of Coonalpyn Downs, the District Council of Meningie and the District Council of Peake. It is geographically the largest council area in South Australia. The economy of the district is based mostly around agriculture.

The council seat is at Tailem Bend; the council also operates service centres in Meningie and Tintinara. The council opened a new civic centre at Tailem Bend on 27 October 2014. This centre is located on Railway Tce and is joined to the Tailem Bend Town Hall.

== Economy ==
Agriculture is prominent in the district, with grain crops the predominant land use. Due to improvement of grain crops in the area, district grain storage near Tailem Bend now holds up to 236 000 tonnes, after a large expansion in 1999.

The region has a well established dairy industry, as well as various other livestock. Olives have been found to suit the climate and soil of the area and may be a potential industry in the future.

The council purchased the old Mitsubishi Car Test Track property at the junction of the Dukes and Mallee Highways, and has leased the park out to enable South Australia's newest motorsport venue with Tailem Bend Motorsport Park Pty Ltd announcing that it is now holding activities and events and accepting bookings. The Tailem Bend Motorsport Park is a new multi sport motorsport park. Motorcycling SA and the Sporting Car Club of South Australia have joined forces to establish the park under the auspices of the Confederation of Australian Motor Sport and Motorcycling Australia.

== Localities ==
The district council includes the towns and localities of Ashville, Bunbury, Carcuma, Colebatch, Coomandook, Cooke Plains, Coombe, Coonalpyn, Coorong, Culburra, Deepwater, Elwomple, Field, Ki Ki, Malinong, Moorlands, Meningie, Meningie East, Meningie West, Netherton, Peake, Poltalloch, Salt Creek, Sherlock, Tintinara, Tailem Bend, Wellington East, Narrung, Waltowa and Yumali, and parts of Jabuk, Lake Alexandrina, Naturi and Ngarkat.

== Councillors ==
The following Councillors were elected on 10 November 2018.

Ward	Councillor	Notes
Parks	Jeff Arthur	Deputy Mayor
Parks	Lisa Rowntree	
Lakes	Sharon Bland	
Lakes	Vern Leng	
Lakes	Tracy Hill	
Mallee	Paul Simmons	Mayor
Mallee	Glynis Taylor	
Mallee	Brenton Qualmann	
Mallee	Neville Jaensch	

== See also ==
- List of parks and gardens in rural South Australia
