= Dukes Highway =

Highway in South Australia

Dukes Highway South Australia
- Coordinates: 35.272343°S 139.459762°E (Northwest end); 36.344113°S 140.967105°E (Southeast end)

General information
- Type: Highway
- Length: 190 km (118 mi)
- Route number(s): A8 (2017–present) Entire route; Concurrencies: B57 (1998–present) (Cannawigara–Bordertown)
- Former route number: National Highway A8 (1998–2017); National Highway 8 (1974–1998); National Route 8 (1955–1974)

Major junctions
- Northwest end: Princes Highway; Tailem Bend, South Australia
- Mallee Highway; Riddoch Highway; Ngarkat Highway
- Southeast end: Western Highway; SA/VIC border

Location(s)
- Region: Murray and Mallee, Limestone Coast
- Major settlements: Coonalpyn, Tintinara, Keith, Bordertown

Highway system
- Highways in Australia; National Highway • Freeways in Australia; Highways in South Australia

Dukes Highway is a 190 kilometre highway corridor in South Australia, which is part of the link between the Australian cities of Adelaide and Melbourne. It is part of the National Highway system spanning Australia, and is signed as route A8.

== Route ==
Dukes Highway begins at the intersection with Princes Highway in Tailem Bend. It heads in a southeast direction to the state border with Victoria just east of Bordertown, continuing into Victoria as Western Highway, with the same route signage (route A8). It is mostly a single carriageway of one lane each way, with 36 overtaking lanes. Approximately 90 kilometres (56 mi) has 'wide centre lines', providing a 1.2 metres (3 ft 11 in) boundary between traffic travelling in opposite directions.

Generally, the quality of Dukes Highway is of a high standard, with the entire road having wide lane widths and sealed shoulders with at least five (and usually six) metres clear beyond the edge line. There are 16 rest areas or parking bays along the Dukes Highway, at approximately 15 km intervals. Each one provides sealed parking space for at least four B-double trucks, with bins, tables, shelter and lighting.

== History ==
Dukes Highway runs through the northern part of the Limestone Coast region of South Australia. The route and many of the settlements, including Bordertown, were established in the 1850s to supply water to horses for the gold escorts from the Victorian goldfields to Adelaide.

Gold was taken to Adelaide rather than the closer Melbourne because a higher price was offered there. The higher price was offered to stop the South Australian economy from collapsing, as all the labourers were heading to the Victorian Goldfields. The Bullion Act was passed and an Assay office was established in Adelaide for the assaying and stamping of gold in 1852. It is claimed that this saved South Australia from bankruptcy.

By the 1930s, the series of separate tracks had started to coalesce into the route it follows today, and was already being referred to as "the Duke's Highway" – after the Duke of York, later King George VI – but at the time the name had never been officially recognised. There was a push to name the road Tolmer Highway, after former police commissioner Alexander Tolmer of gold escort fame, but this never eventuated.

In the latter half of the 20th century, the western end of Dukes Highway was realigned to meet the Mallee Highway closer to Tailem Bend. It previously ran north from Coomandook on the alignment that is now known as the Old Dukes Highway to Moorlands.

The final 17 km of the highway after Bordertown, was originally built on unstable ground, and was re-constructed in 2005.

== Safety ==
Dukes Highway is South Australia's deadliest major road, with 28 deaths in the 5 years to 2009. This has led to calls for road improvements to separate traffic in each direction with a dual carriageway. Point-to-point speed cameras have been installed on one section of the highway to identify drivers who flout the speed limit.

Parts of the highway have wider centre lines installed, with audio tactile treatment to help drivers to realise and recover from drifting across the centre line before they encounter an oncoming vehicle. This is intended to reduce fatigue and inattention-related crashes.

== Major intersections ==
State	LGA	Location	km	mi	Destinations	Notes
South Australia	Coorong	Tailem Bend	0.0	0.0	Princes Highway (A1 north, B1 south) – Adelaide, Murray Bridge, Meningie	Northwestern terminus of highway and route A8
South Australia	Coorong	Tailem Bend	1.9	1.2	Adelaide–Wolseley railway line	
South Australia	Coorong	Tailem Bend	3.0	1.9	Mallee Highway (B12) – Lameroo, Pinnaroo	
South Australia	Coorong	Coomandook	31.7	19.7	Old Dukes Highway – Moorlands	
South Australia	Coorong	Coonalpyn	61.3	38.1	McIntosh Way – Meningie	
South Australia	Coorong	Tintinara	94.9	59.0	Adelaide–Wolseley railway line	
South Australia	Tatiara	Keith	125	78	Riddoch Highway (A66) – Naracoorte, Penola, Mount Gambier	
South Australia	Tatiara	Cannawigara	161	100	Ngarkat Highway (B57 north) – Pinnaroo, Loxton	Concurrency with route B57
South Australia	Tatiara	Bordertown	171	106	Naracoorte Road (B57 south) – Naracoorte, Penola, Mount Gambier	Concurrency with route B57
South Australia	Tatiara	Bordertown	172	107	Adelaide–Wolseley railway line	
South Australia	Tatiara	Wolseley	190	120	Dukes Highway (A8)	Southeastern terminus of Dukes Highway
State border			190	120	South Australia – Victoria state border	
Victoria	West Wimmera	Serviceton	190	120	Western Highway (A8) – Horsham, Ballarat, Melbourne	Western terminus of Western Highway, route A8 continues east
Concurrency terminus; Route transition

== See also ==
- Highways in Australia
- Highways in Victoria
- List of highways in South Australia
