= District Council of Meningie =

District Council of Meningie South Australia
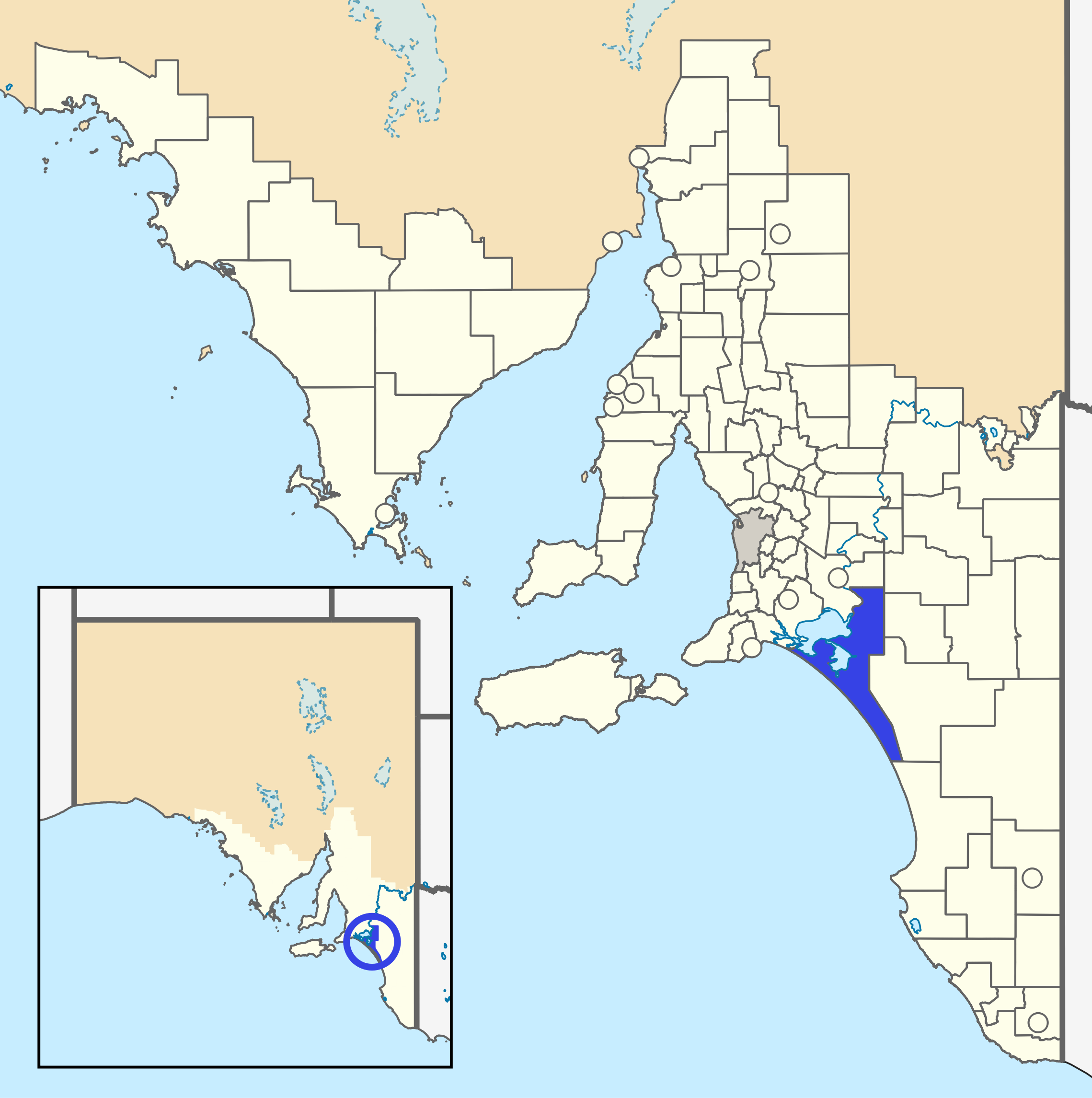
- The District Council of Meningie as it was prior to disestablishment (blue)
- Coordinates: 35°41′27″S 139°20′15″E
- Population: 2,100 (1936)
  - Density: 0.767/km^{2} (1.99/sq mi)
- Established: 1888
- Abolished: 1997
- Area: 2,737.0 km^{2} (1,056.8 sq mi)1936
- Council seat: Meningie (1936)

The District Council of Meningie was a local government area in the colony and then the Australian state of South Australia that existed from 1888 to 1997 on land in the state’s south-east.

It was proclaimed on 5 January 1888 under the District Councils Act 1887 with its seat being located in the town of Meningie.

At establishment, it consisted of land in the hundreds of Baker, Bonney, Burdett, Coolinong, Glyde, Malcolm and Neville, Santo and Seymour and the part of the County of Cardwell located to the west of the hundreds of Glyde, Neville, and Santo.

In 1936, it covered an area of 676,320 acres (2,737.0 km^{2}; 1,056.75 sq mi) and had an estimated population of 2,100 people of which 575 were ratepayers.

On 13 February 1997, it and the district councils of Coonalpyn Downs and Peake were amalgamated to create the Coorong District Council.
