= Ki Ki, South Australia =

Ki Ki
- Town
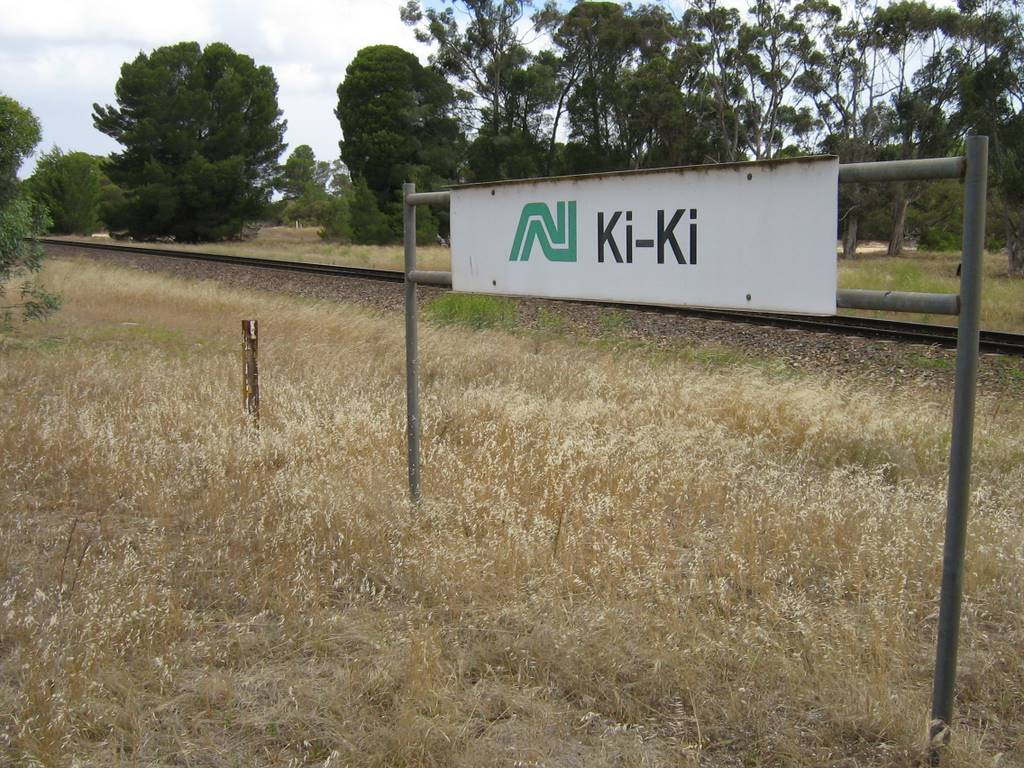
- Sign at the former railway station

- Coordinates: 35°34′05″S 139°47′34″E
- Country: Australia
- State: South Australia
- Region: Murray and Mallee
- LGA: Coorong District Council
- Location: 130 km (81 mi) SE of Adelaide; 49 km (30 mi) SE of Tailem Bend
- Established: 12 June 1913 (town); 24 August 2000 (locality)

Government
  - State electorate: MacKillop
  - Federal division: Barker
- Elevation: 28 m (92 ft)

Population
  - Total: 47 (SAL 2021)
- Postcode: 5261
- County: Buccleuch
Localities around Ki Ki
Yumali	Yumali; Netherton	Netherton
Yumali	Ki Ki	Netherton; Coonalpyn
Coonalpyn	Coonalpyn	Coonalpyn
- Locations; Adjoining localities

Ki Ki is a small town in South Australia. It is on the Dukes Highway (A8) adjacent to the Adelaide-Melbourne railway, the main links between Adelaide and Melbourne. The town is the primary settlement for the Hundred of Livingston.

The town was proclaimed on 12 June 1913. It got its name from the Kik Ki Well, which in turn was derived from the Aboriginal name for the worms dug out of the nearby soakage. It has a small post office, parking bay, town hall, engineering business "Ki Ki Engineering", and is surrounded by large pastoral properties. At the 2006 census, Ki Ki had a population of 193. Its postcode is 5261.

Ki Ki had a Congregational Church, which was built in 1910 and closed in 1969.

Ki Ki has an active tennis club, which belongs to the Border-Downs Tennis Association.

Australian rules footballer Martin Mattner grew up in the town.

== Photo gallery ==
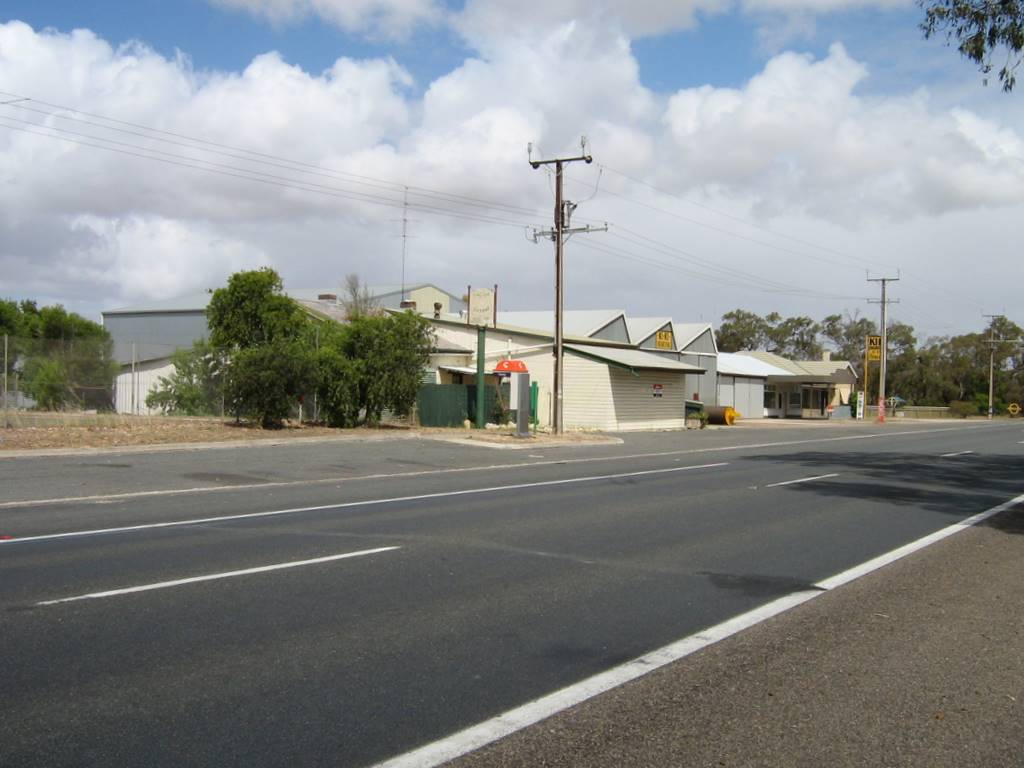
Main Street

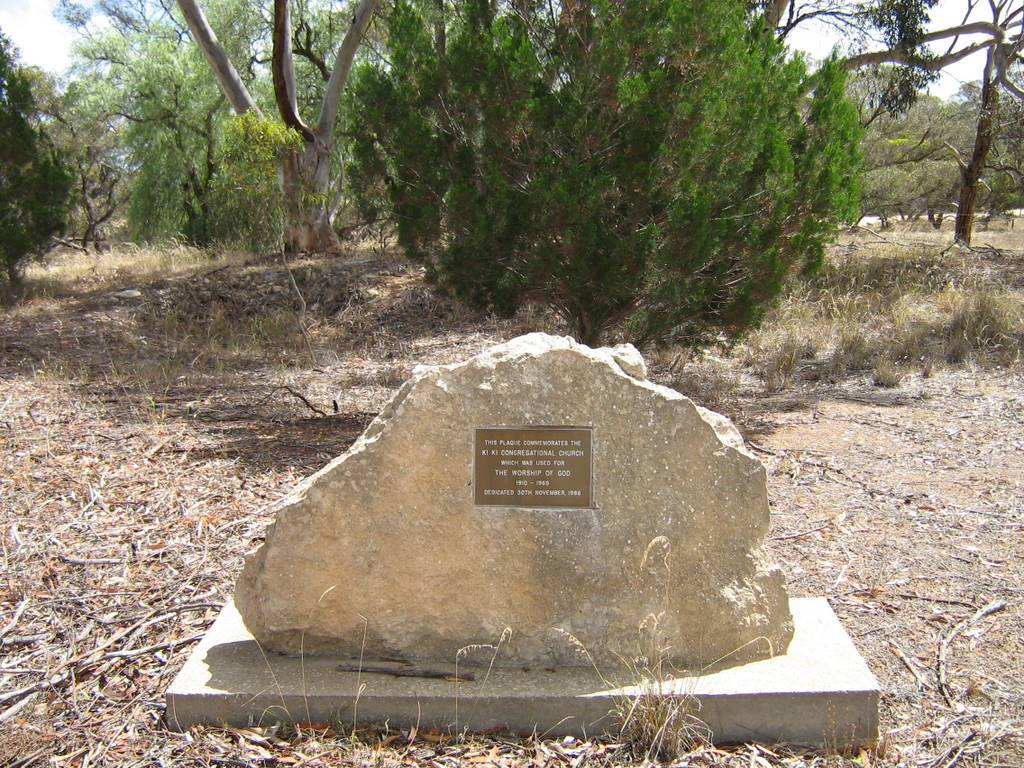
Site of the Congregational Church

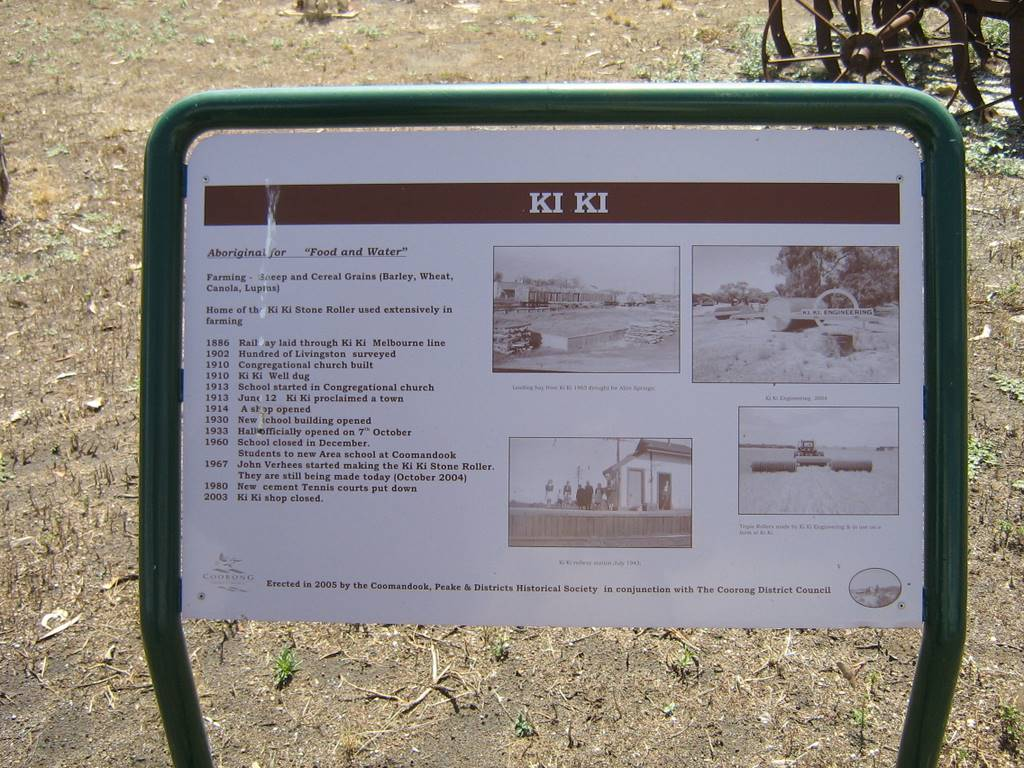
Information board in the parking bay.

== See also ==
- List of reduplicated Australian place names
