= Sherlock, South Australia =

Sherlock South Australia
- Coordinates: 35.3202°S 139.8037°E
- Population: 70 (SAL 2021)
- Established: 8 August 1907 (town); 24 August 2000 (locality)
- Postcode(s): 5301
- Elevation: 17 m (56 ft)
- LGA(s): The Coorong District Council
- State electorate(s): Electoral district of Hammond
- Federal division(s): Division of Barker
Localities around Sherlock:
Wynarka	Karoonda
Moorlands	Sherlock	Peake
Coomandook	Yumali

Sherlock is a town and locality in the Australian state of South Australia. It is on the Pinnaroo railway line and Mallee Highway.

== History ==
The town was surveyed in May 1907. The railway station opened in January 1913, with the stationmaster also responsible for the Moorlands station 9 miles (14 km) west. The Sherlock Baptist Church opened in 1911, and was the first stone building erected along the Pinnaroo railway line.
