= County of Buccleuch =

Buccleuch South Australia
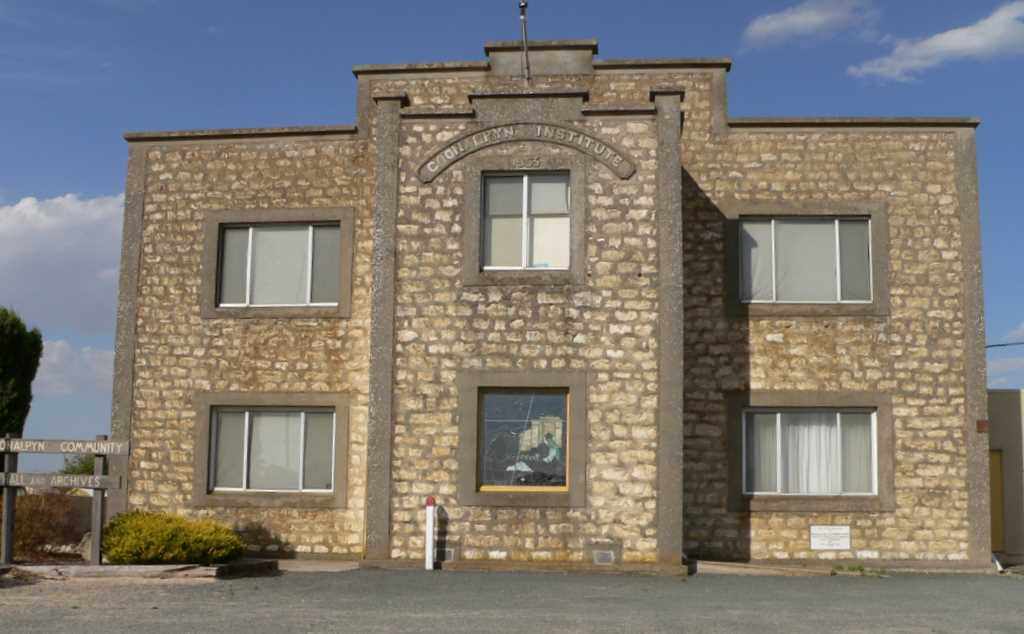
- Coonalpyn town hall in the Hundred of Coneybeer

- Coordinates: 35.32°S 139.94°E
- Established: 4 May 1893
- Area: 6,035 km^{2} (2,330.1 sq mi)
Lands administrative divisions around Buccleuch:
Sturt	Albert	Alfred
Russell	Buccleuch	Chandos
Cardwell	Cardwell	Buckingham

The County of Buccleuch is one of the 49 cadastral counties of South Australia. It was proclaimed in 1893 and named for the sixth Duke of Buccleuch, William Scott, of Scotland. It is located east of the Murray River at the south western edge of the Mallee region.

The small locality of Buccleuch and its railway station are located at the centre of the county.

== Hundreds ==
The County of Buccleuch is divided into the following 17 hundreds:

- Hundred of Bowhill (Bowhill)
- Hundred of Vincent (Perponda)
- Hundred of Wilson (Borrika)
- Hundred of McPherson (Halidon, Sandalwood)
- Hundred of Hooper (Wynarka)
- Hundred of Marmon Jabuk (Karoonda)
- Hundred of Molineux (Marama)
- Hundred of Sherlock (Sherlock)
- Hundred of Roby (Coomandook)
- Hundred of Peake (Peake)
- Hundred of Price (Geranium)
- Hundred of Kirkpatrick (Yumali)
- Hundred of Livingston (Ki Ki)
- Hundred of Carcuma (Carcuma)
- Hundred of Strawbridge (Coonalpyn, Field)
- Hundred of Coneybeer (Coonalpyn)
- Hundred of Lewis (Coonalpyn, Tintinara)
