= Coomandook =

Coomandook South Australia
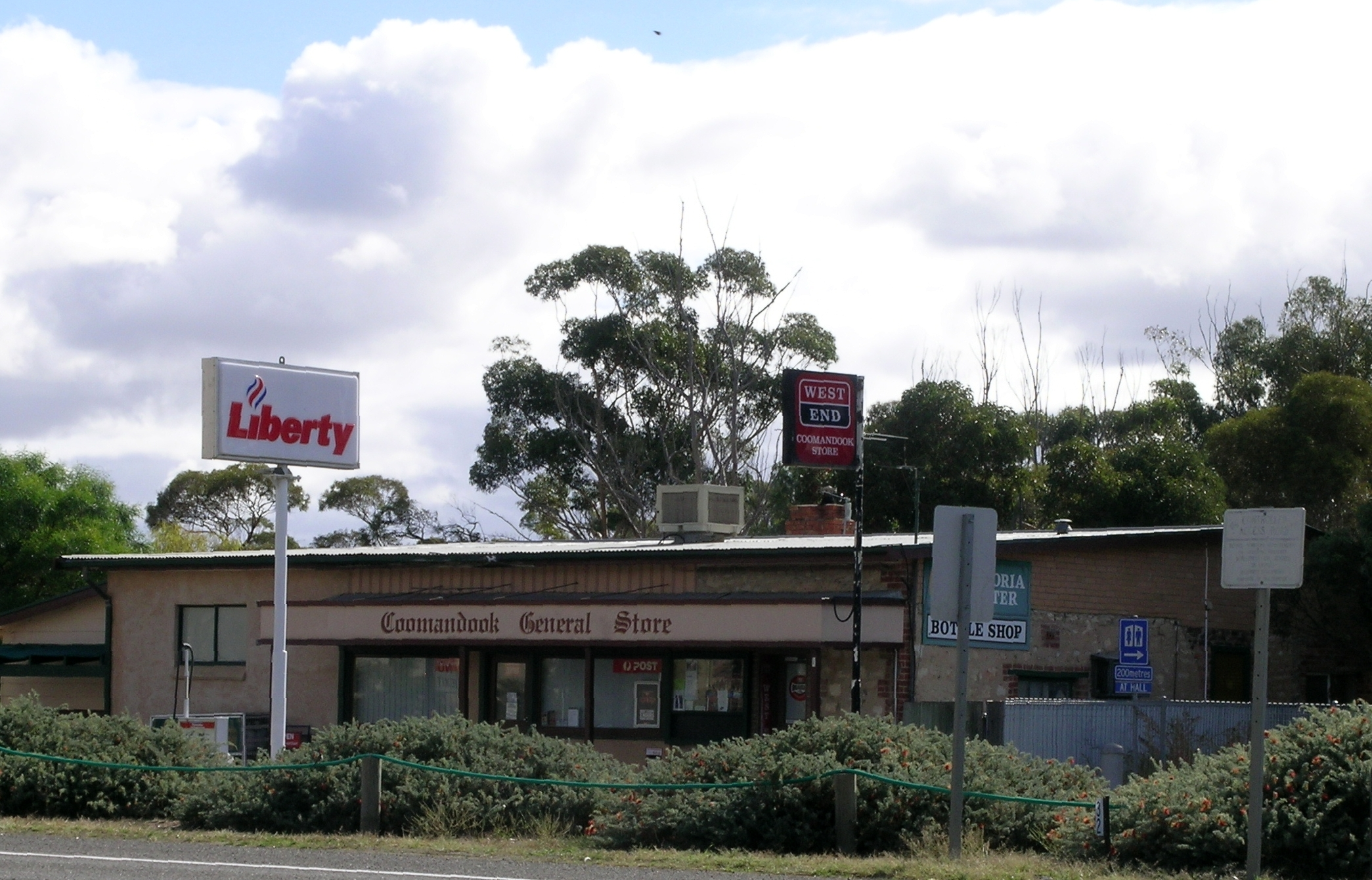
- The general store and bottle shop at Coomandook.

- Coordinates: 35.4693°S 139.6990°E
- Population: 83 (SAL 2021)
- Postcode(s): 5261
- Elevation: 16 m (52 ft)
- Location: 120 km (75 mi) SE of Adelaide
- LGA(s): Coorong District Council
- State electorate(s): MacKillop
- Federal division(s): Barker

Coomandook is a settlement about 120 kilometres (75 mi) east-south-east of Adelaide on Dukes Highway in South Australia. The nearest place with a larger population is Coonalpyn, which is 29 kilometres (18 mi) away, with a population of around 230.

Coomandook is near the edge of the vast mallee scrub area which stretches from western Victoria across into the south east of South Australia. The most common agricultural industries are sheep, beef cattle rearing and grain growing.

The population of Coomandook was not recorded under that name in the 2006 census, but 134 voters cast their votes in Coomandook during the 2010 election.
