= Coonalpyn, South Australia =

Coonalpyn
- Town
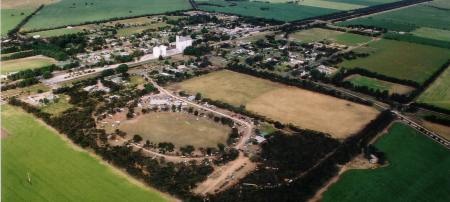
- Aerial view of Coonalpyn

- Coordinates: 35°41′54″S 139°51′19″E
- Country: Australia
- State: South Australia
- Region: Murray and Mallee
- LGA: The Coorong District Council
- Location: 143 km (89 mi) SE of Adelaide; 61 km (38 mi) SE of Tailem Bend
- Established: 25 November 1909 (town); 24 August 2000 (locality)

Government
  - State electorate: MacKillop
  - Federal division: Barker
- Elevation (railway station): 22 m (72 ft)

Population
  - Total: 193 (UCL 2021)
- Time zone: UTC+9:30 (ACST)
  - Summer (DST): UTC+10:30 (ACST)
- Postcode: 5265
- County: Buccleuch
- Mean max temp: 20.8 °C (69.4 °F)
- Mean min temp: 10.3 °C (50.5 °F)
- Annual rainfall: 469.2 mm (18.47 in)
Localities around Coonalpyn
Meningie East	Yumali; Ki Ki; Netherton; Carcuma; Geranium	Geranium
Meningie East	Coonalpyn	Tintinara
Field	Field; Culburra	Tintinara; Culburra
- Locations; Adjoining localities

Coonalpyn (/ˈkʊnælpɪn/; koo-NAL-pin) is a town and a locality in the Australian state of South Australia located about 143 kilometres (89 mi) south-east of the state capital of Adelaide and about 61 kilometres (38 mi) south-east of the municipal seat in Tailem Bend. It is within the local government area of the Coorong District Council, the State electoratal district of MacKillop and the Federal division of Barker.

== Origin of the name ==
Logo of the former District Council of Coonalpyn Downs

The town's name is derived from the Aboriginal word Coonalpyn, meaning "barren woman". Coonalpyn Downs was chosen by John Barton Hack to name the property, and the railway station within its boundaries took the same name.

== History ==
The town of Coonalpyn was proclaimed on 25 November 1909.

Coonalpyn was considered as part of the Ninety Mile Desert until about 1949, when the land was developed by the AMP Society.

The town became the seat for the District Council of Coonalpyn Downs, established on 30 May 1957.

In 1997, the District Council of Coonalpyn Downs amalgamated with the Peake District Council and Meningie District Council to form The Coorong District Council.

Electricity came to Coonalpyn through the ETSA in 1962, and the Tailem Bend–Keith pipeline was constructed in 1968.

Boundaries for the locality of Coonalpyn were set on 24 August 2000.

=== Lutheran churches ===
A group of Lutheran settlers moved to the Coonalpyn district in the early 1920s, the first congregation, Bethlehem Lutheran Congregation, being formed in 1930. A second congregation, Immanuel Lutheran Congregation, was formed in 1940. In 1952, the two congregations decided to move out of the old town institute into a new Coonalpyn Lutheran Church. The church was finished and dedicated in 1953. When Lutheran Amalgamation occurred in 1966, the United Evangelical Lutheran Church in Australia (UELCA) and Evangelical Lutheran Church of Australia (ELCA) congregations merged to form the Redeemer Lutheran congregation, and a new parish was formed that included congregations at Tintinara and Meningie.

== Sporting teams ==
In 1992, the Australian Rules Border-Downs Magpies and Tintinara Blues amalgamated to form the Border-Downs Tintinara Crows Football Club. The club was then a member of the River Murray Football League, and in 2001 joined the Mallee Football League. This also includes the Crows Netball Club.

Coonalpyn has a tennis club that belongs to the Border-Downs Tennis Association, which includes Malinong, Culburra, Yumali, Coomandook, Tintinara and Ki Ki.

An active lawn bowls club which has a series of "community bowls" nights during the summer months to encourage the community to enjoy lawn bowls.

== Photo gallery ==
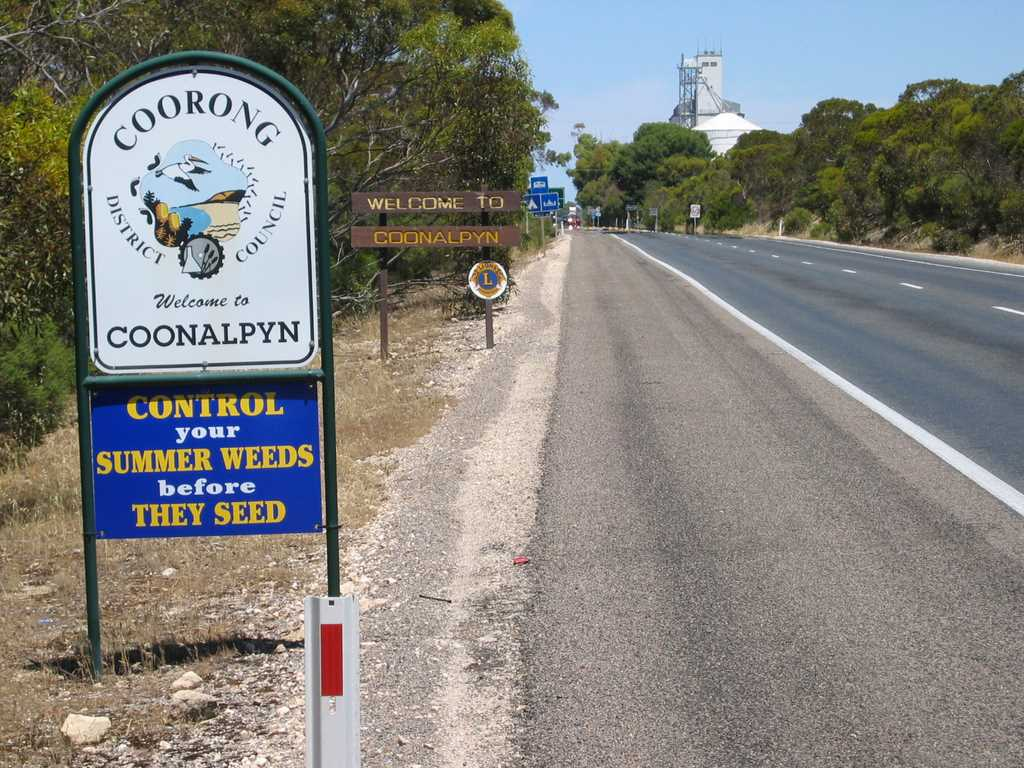
Entrance to Coonalpyn

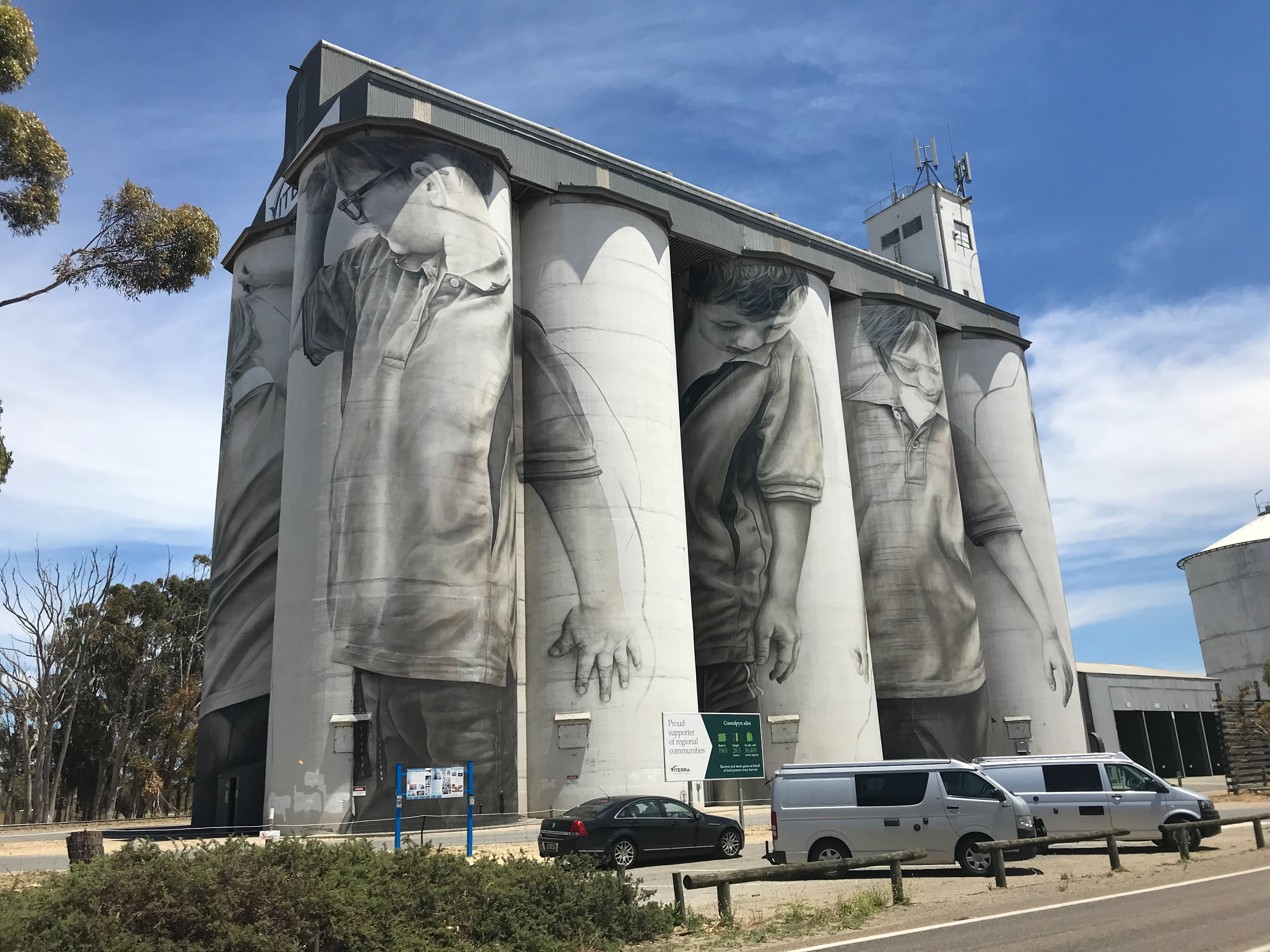
Art on the grain silos at Coonalpyn

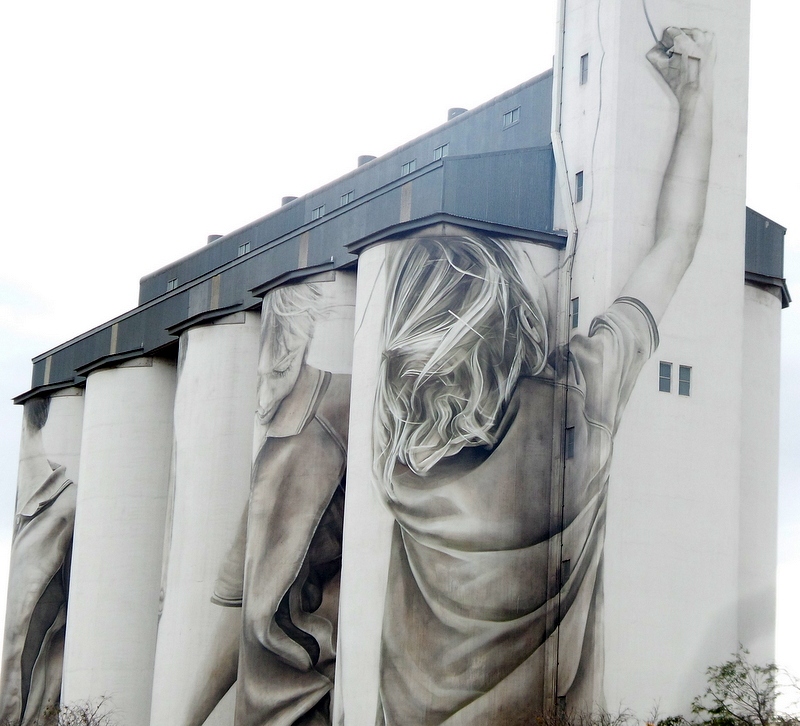
End view of silos

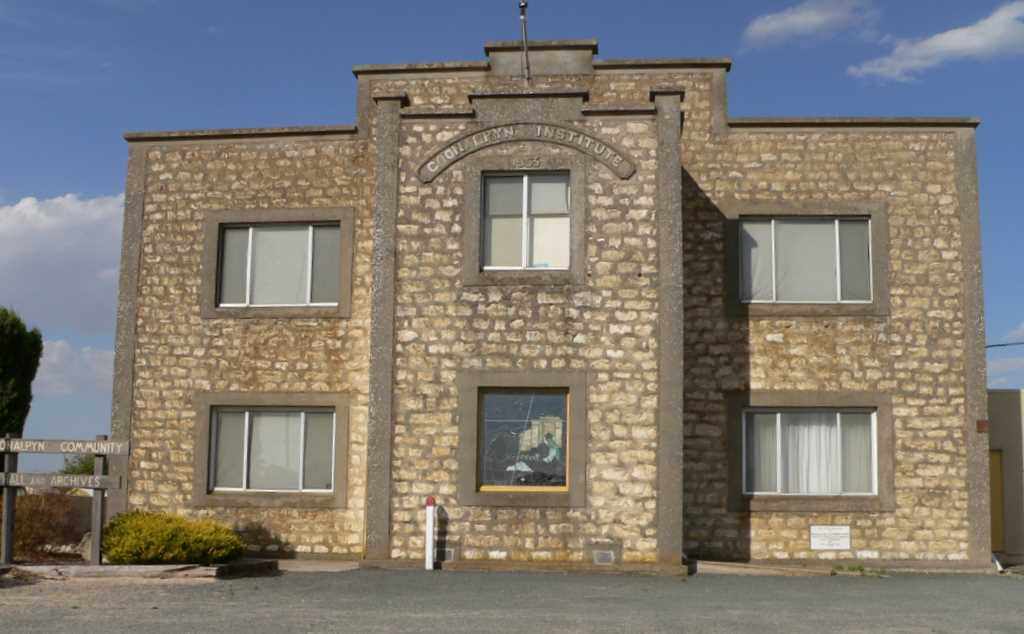
Town hall / Institute building

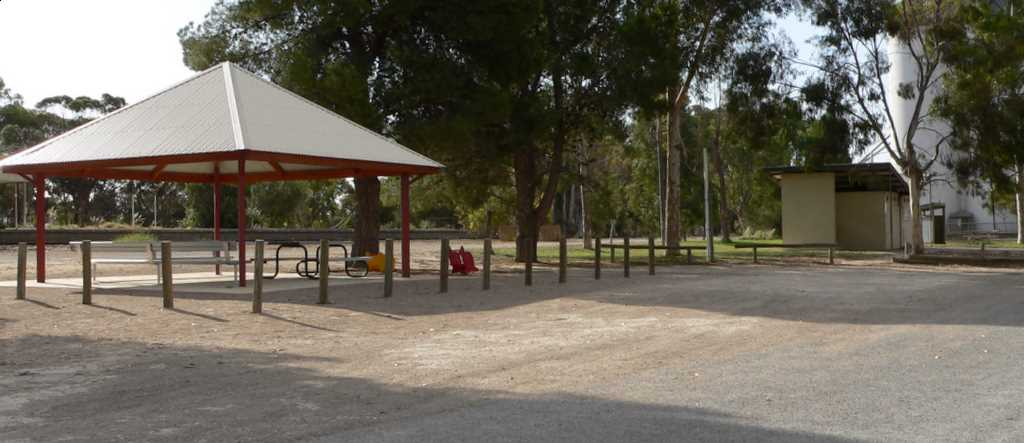
Parking bay at highway rest area

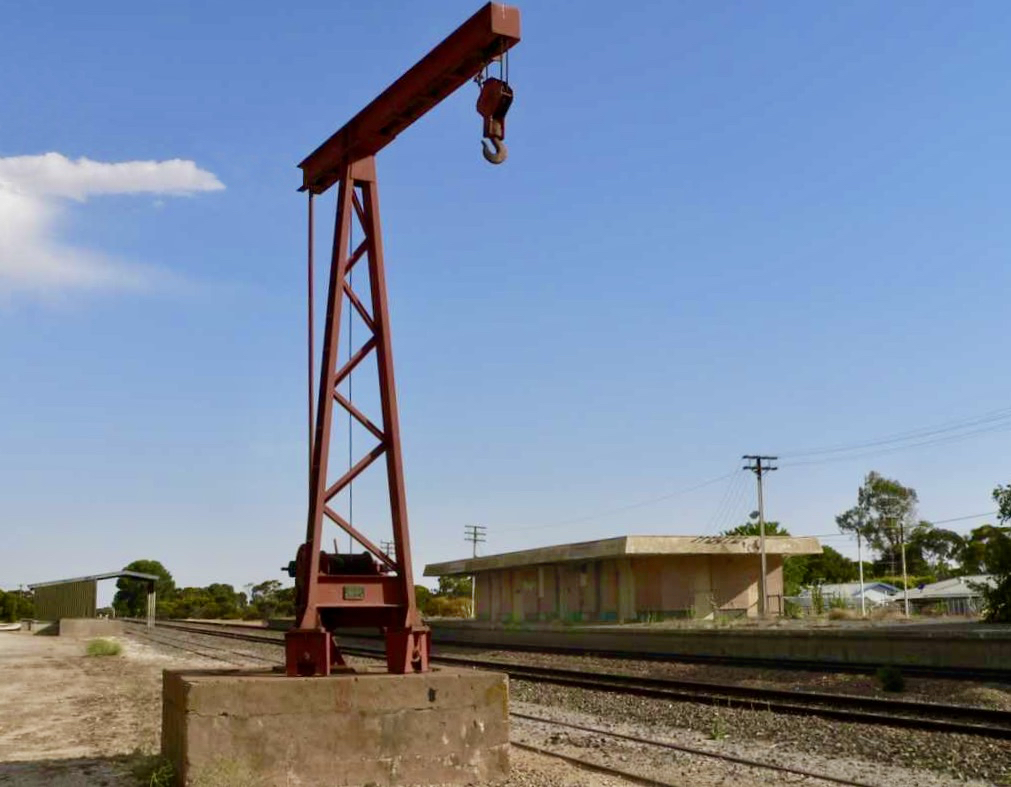
Old Coonalpyn railway station

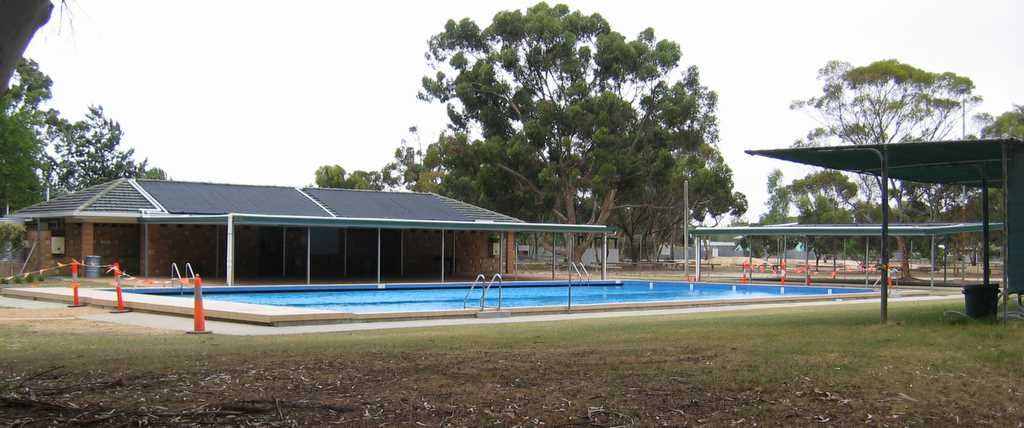
Community swimming pool

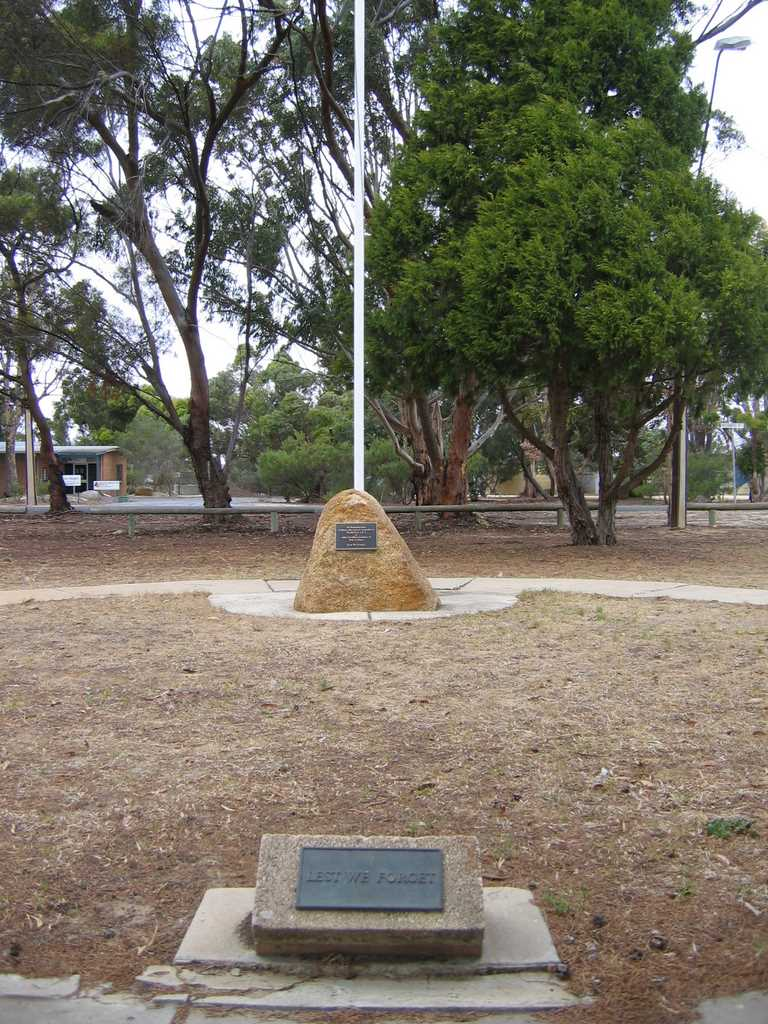
War memorial

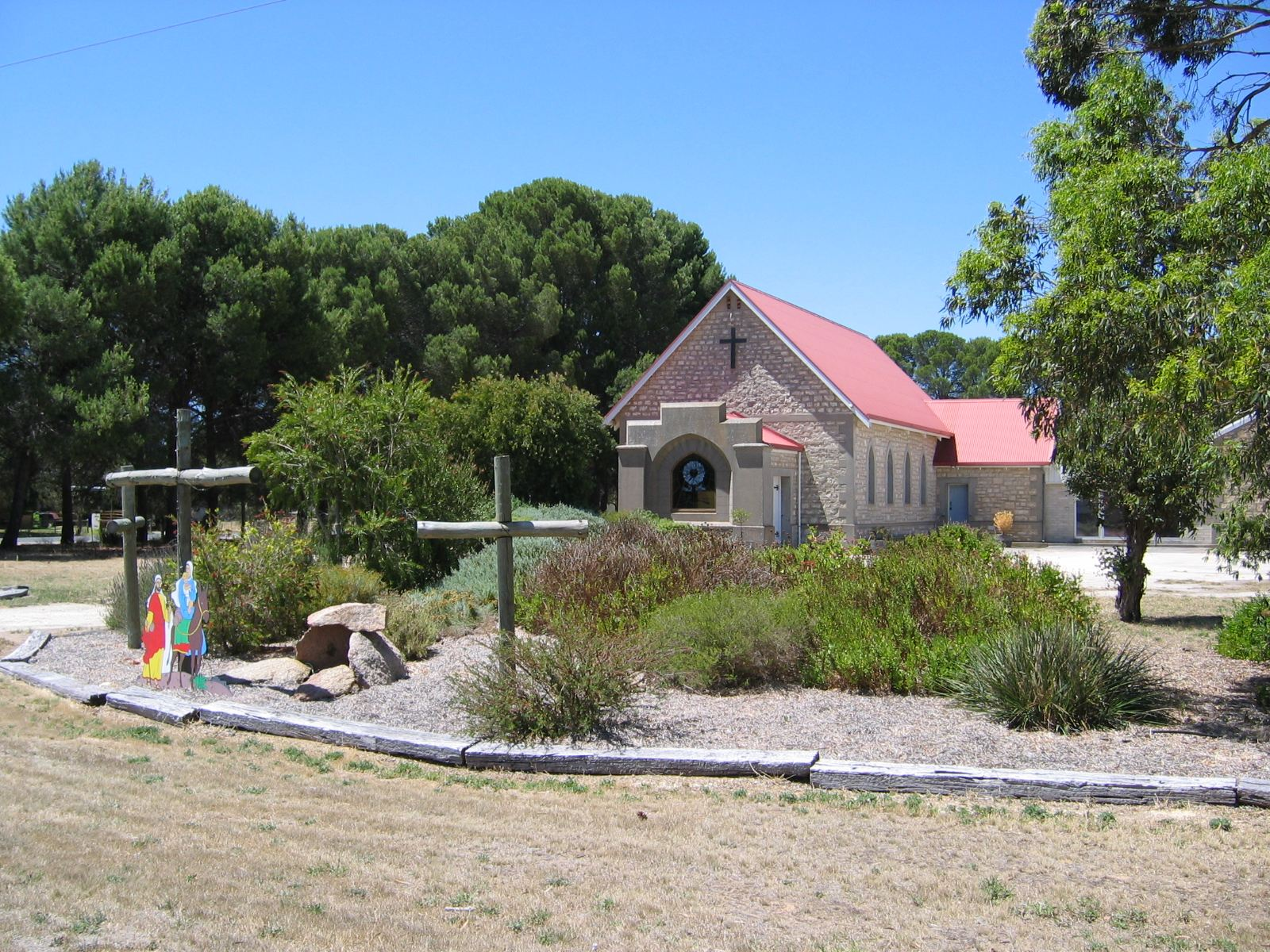
Redeemer Lutheran Church

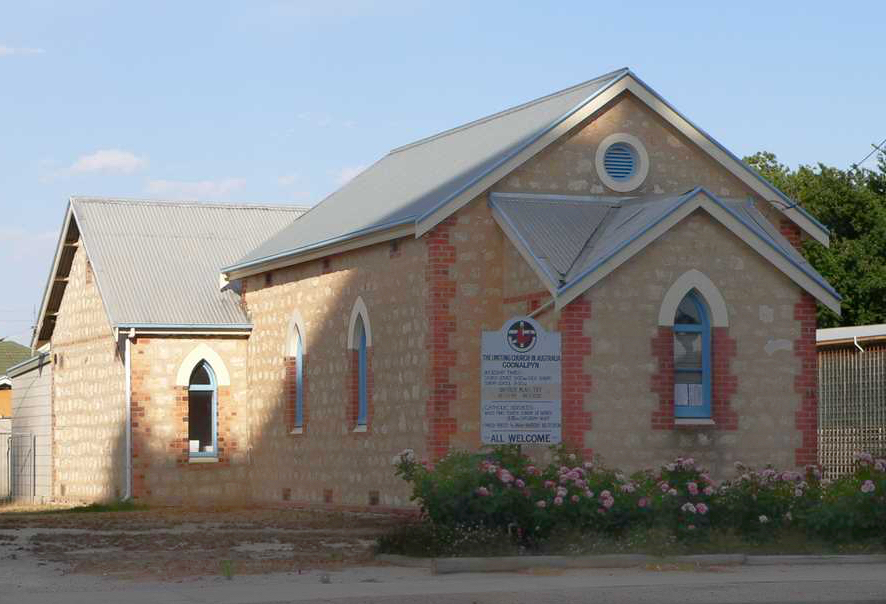
Uniting Church

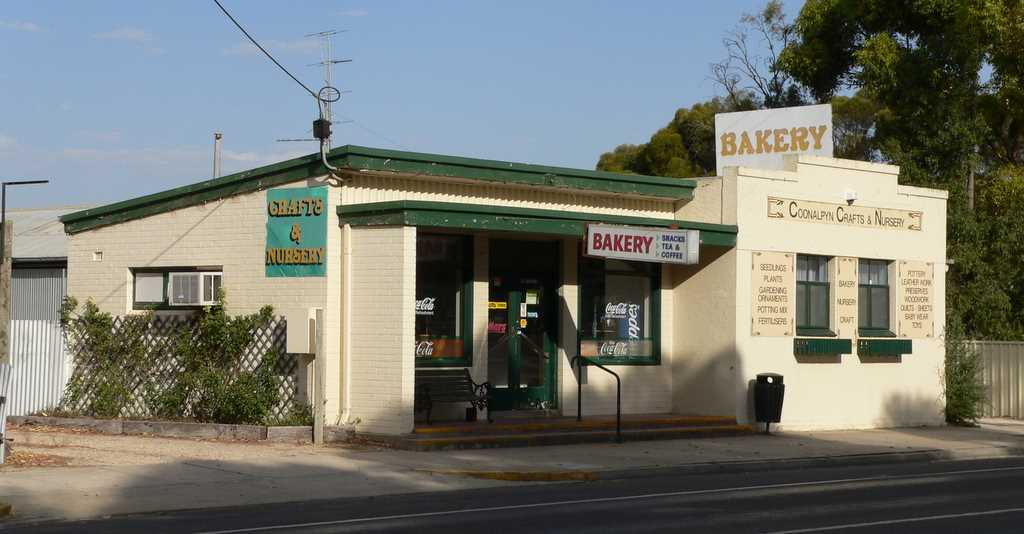
Coonalpyn Bakery

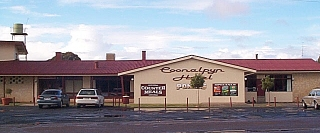
Coonalpyn Hotel

== See also ==
- Tauragat Well
