= Coorong (disambiguation) =

Coorong may refer to:

== Places in Australia ==
=== South Australia ===
- (The) Coorong, a coastal lagoon; also, the long beach along the coast
  - Camp Coorong, a cultural and weaving centre
  - Coorong Game Reserve, a former protected area
  - Coorong National Park, a protected area
  - Coorong Important Bird Area, an important bird area
  - Coorong, South Australia, a locality
- Coorong District Council, a local government area

=== Victoria ===
- Lake Coorong, a lake

== Other uses ==
- Coorong mullet, a local common name used in South Australia for the yellow-eyed mullet

== See also ==
- Coorong and Lakes Alexandrina and Albert Wetland, a wetland system
- Coorong, Lower Lakes and Murray Mouth (CLLMM) Research Centre, a research centre located in Goolwa
- Coorong rufous bristlebird, a bird species found in Australia
- Cooronga, a genus of fruit fly
- Coorongite, a hydrocarbon material similar to Elaterite
