= Hundred of Field =

Field
- Cadastral division
- Coordinates: 35.893°S 139.657°E
- Country: Australia
- State: South Australia
- Established: 10 February 1938

Area
  - Total: 250 km^{2} (95 sq mi)
- County: Cardwell
Lands administrative divisions around Field
Bonney	Jeffries	Strawbridge
Glyde	Field	Colebatch
Santo	Messent	Messent

The Hundred of Field is a cadastral hundred of the County of Cardwell (South Australia), centred on the rural localities of Field and Colebatch, South Australia. It was proclaimed by Governor Winston Dugan in 1938 and named for Edgar John Field, a local government administrator of the day.
