= Messent Conservation Park =

Protected area in South Australia

- IUCN category III (natural monument or feature)
- Location within South Australia
- Location: South Australia
- Nearest city: Salt Creek
- Coordinates: 36°03′32″S 139°46′22″E
- Area: 115.83 km^{2} (44.72 sq mi)
- Established: 9 January 1964
- Governing body: Department for Environment and Water

Messent Conservation Park, formerly the Messent National Park and the Messent Wildlife Reserve, is a protected area in the Australian state of South Australia located in the state’s south-east in the gazetted localities of Colebatch and Deepwater about 164 kilometres (102 mi) south-east of the state capital of Adelaide and about 6 kilometres (3.7 mi) north-east of the town centre in Salt Creek.

The conservation park consists of land in sections 1 and 65 of the cadastral unit of the Hundred of Colebatch and sections 1 and 10 in the cadastral unit of the Hundred of Messent. Section 1 in the Hundred of Messent first acquired protected area status as a wild-life reserve proclaimed under the Crown Lands Act 1929. On 9 November 1967, this land was proclaimed as the Messent National Park under the National Parks Act 1966. On 18 June 1970, section 1 in the Hundred of Colebatch was added to the national park. On 27 April 1972, the national park was reconstituted as the Messent Conservation Park under the National Parks and Wildlife Act 1972. On 6 December 1979, section 65 in Hundred of Colebatch and section 19 in Hundred of Messent were added to the conservation park. As of 2018, it covered an area of 115.83 square kilometres (44.72 sq mi).

In 1980, the conservation park was described as follows:

Messent Conservation Park conserves a large area of open scrub, open heath and tussock sedgeland, which include seven rare plant species. These associations, in turn, provide valuable habitat for western grey kangaroos, wombats, echidnas, ash-grey mice, emus, mallee fowl and a variety of waterbirds… This park is an extensive area of sand plain overlain by stabilized sand dunes. Sedge flats, swamps and a lake occur in the interdunal depressions. The vegetation is primarily Eucalyptus diversifolia open scrub with relatively large areas of open heath and tussock sedgeland…

Messent is currently recovering (regenerating) from a recent bushfire (1977). The swamps and lake do not fill to the same level as they used to in the past and this may be attributed (at least in part) to the drainage of swampy land further to the south…

The conservation park is categorised as an IUCN Category III protected area In 1980, it was listed on the now-defunct Register of the National Estate.

== See also ==
- Protected areas of South Australia
