= Colebatch =

Colebatch may refer to:

- Colebatch, Shropshire, a village in England
- Colebatch, South Australia, a locality
- Hal Colebatch, former Premier of Western Australia
- his son Hal Gibson Pateshall Colebatch, Australian author and journalist
- Hundred of Colebatch, a cadastral unit in South Australia
- John Colebatch
