= Prasophyllum asinantum =

Scientific classification
- Kingdom: Plantae
- Clade: Tracheophytes
- Clade: Angiosperms
- Clade: Monocots
- Order: Asparagales
- Family: Orchidaceae
- Subfamily: Orchidoideae
- Tribe: Diurideae
- Genus: Prasophyllum
- Species: P. asinantum

Binomial name
- Prasophyllum asinantum R.J.Bates

Species of orchid

Prasophyllum asinantum is a species of orchid that is endemic to the south-east of South Australia. It has a single dark green leaf and up to five sweetly-scented, greenish-brown flowers with a cream-coloured and green labellum. It only flowers after summer bushfires.

== Description ==
Prasophyllum asinantum is a slender, terrestrial herb with an underground tuber and a single dark green leaf up to 180 mm (7.1 in) long, 0.8–1 mm (0.031–0.039 in) wide and sheathing the flowering stem for half its length. Up to five sweetly-scented, greenish-brown flowers are arranged on the flowering spike. As with others in the genus, the flowers are inverted so that the labellum is above the column rather than below it. The dorsal sepal is egg-shaped, up to 3 mm (0.12 in) wide and dished. The lateral sepals are lance-shaped, spread apart from each other and about 1 mm (0.039 in) wide. The petals are oblong, about 3 mm (0.12 in) long, 1 mm (0.039 in) wide and have pale edges. The labellum is egg-shaped to wedge-shaped, up to 8 mm (0.31 in) long, 2 mm (0.079 in) wide, cream-coloured and green, with a channelled, yellowish-green callus up to 3 mm (0.12 in) long. Flowering only occurs after summer bushfires.

== Taxonomy and naming ==
Prasophyllum asinantum was first formally described in 2015 by Robert John Bates in Australian Orchid Review from a specimen he collected in 2013. The specific epithet (asinantum) means "insignificant", referring to the "unspectacular and short-lived nature of the plants".

== Distribution and habitat ==
This orchid is only known from the mid to upper southeast of South Australia, where it grows on and near low limestone rises on plains in the Big Heath, Gum Lagoon and Mount Boothby Conservation Parks.
