= Hundred of Coombe =

The Hundred of Coombe is a Hundred of the County of Cardwell (South Australia) centred on the bounded rural locality of Colebatch, South Australia near the town of Tintinara, South Australia in the Murray Mallee region of South Australia.
