= Didicoolum =

Homestead in Petherick, South Australia

Coordinates: 36°25′18″S 140°13′54″E

Didicoolum is a homestead located in the gazetted locality of Petherick in the Australian state of South Australia.

== Location ==
Didicoolum is located within the state government region of the Limestone Coast at 36º 25' 24.06"S 140º 13' 55.51"E.

It is at an altitude of 32.59 metres above sea level, and is in the Hundred of Petherick.

== Name ==
The name Didicoolum is considered to be derived from the Aboriginal word didikalam, referring to waterholes. However Professor Norman Tindale believed it is related it to tartankaram, referring to a smoke fire of the ancestral being, Karam.

== Mining Activities ==
Gold drew the attention of gold prospectors as early as 1886, and in 1899 a vein of goldbearing quartz was discovered which raised hopes for the further expansion of gold mining activities in the South-East of Australia. However, the search quickly turned to the discovery of petroleum between Lake Albert station and Didicoolum station.
