= John Francis Peggotty =

Irish bushranger in Australia

John Francis Peggotty (1864–1899), also known as the Birdman of the Coorong, was an Irish bushranger in the colony of South Australia. He reputedly rode an ostrich and wore large amounts of gold jewellery while committing his crimes, although elements of his story are said to be fabricated.

== Early life ==
John Francis Peggotty, sometimes known as Liam Peggotty, was born in County Limerick 1864. It is reported that he was born three months prematurely, and never grew larger than the size of a seven-year-old child. His small stature was ideal for his first job as a chimney sweep.

As a young man, Peggotty travelled to South Africa, where he learnt how to ride ostriches. He then travelled to England where he reputedly began breaking into houses by climbing down the chimney. It was also in England that he began wearing a large amount of gold jewellery. He served a five-year prison sentence in England, after which he emigrated to Australia.

Another version of the story is that his family did not approve of ostrich racing because it involved gambling, and had him shipped to Australia from South Africa.

== Life in Australia ==
Arriving in Australia, Peggotty was supposed to work on his uncle's farm in Orange, New South Wales, but after being found in possession of his aunt's jewellery, was asked to leave. He may have resumed his criminal activity in Adelaide, of burglary through chimneys. He is also alleged to have recruited a gang of young boys to work with him.

He moved to the Coorong region in 1898, and found a wild ostrich on the road. Ostriches had been imported from South Africa during the late 19th century to be farmed for their feathers. Peggotty became a bushranger. Riding on his ostrich, Peggotty would surprise his victims with his appearance, holding them up with a pair of small pistols. He is described as riding his ostrich bare-chested and wearing a large amount of gold jewellery. His victims included travellers on Cobb & Co. coaches.

Police dismissed reports of Peggotty until the body of a man was found with large bird prints in the dirt surrounding him. He was confronted by a group of horse mounted police in 1899 while riding his ostrich, and despite the police opening fire and giving chase, Peggotty escaped. Peggotty is believed to have committed at least 12 hold-ups and one more murder.

== Death and legacy ==
On 17 September 1899, during the commission of a hold-up near the town of Meningie, Peggotty was shot and critically wounded by his victim, Henry Carmichael. The ostrich on which Peggotty was riding was also shot, and fled with Peggotty still mounted on it. The body of the ostrich was recovered and a trail of blood was seen travelling away from the bird, but the body of Peggotty was never found. His amassed fortune, reputedly more than a million dollars' worth, which he wore on his body, was never recovered.

Some doubt the veracity of the story of Peggotty, claiming that the story has been perpetuated to boost local tourism. Meningie erected a statue of an ostrich wearing a riding saddle in commemoration of Peggotty in May 2013. The statue is of an emu painted to look like an ostrich.
