= Ellen Trevorrow =

Australian Ngarrindjeri weaver

Ellen Trevorrow, also known as "Aunty Ellen", is an internationally-known Australian Ngarrindjeri weaver, educator, and authority on Ngarrindjeri culture. She is the head of the Camp Coorong Centre for Cultural Education and Race Relations and also serves on the board of the Ngarrindjeri Regional Authority.

== Early life and education ==
Born in 1955 in Point McLeay, now Raukkan, South Australia, Ellen Trevorrow was raised outside Tailem Bend by her grandmother, Ellen Brown, and attended primary school there. When she was 11 she moved to Bonney Reserve near Meningie and completed high school there. At the age of 14 she met her future husband, Tom Trevorrow.

In 1982 she attended a workshop on Ngarrindjeri weaving led by Aunty Dorrie Kartinyeri, an elder from Point McLeay (now Raukkan). There was a long tradition of Ngarrindjeri weaving by women, originally for their own use, later for sale, but the practice had almost been lost. Trevorrow and another workshop attendee, Yvonne Koolmatrie, have devoted their lives to reviving the tradition to preserve Ngarrindjeri culture.

== Work ==
Trevorrow is especially known for her "Sister" baskets, a type of basket that she revived after viewing an example in the Camp Coorong museum made by her husband's great-grandmother. She has frequently collaborated with Jelina Haines.

In recent years she has undertaken a number of large weaving projects for museums, such as Pondi, the giant cod that created the Murray River in Ngarrindjeri legend, done for the South Australian Maritime Museum in 2022.

== Other activities ==
Apart from her work as an artist, Trevorrow is an author and educator, focused on "building bridges between Indigenous and non-Indigenous communities". She shares her cultural knowledge and likes to teach people about Aboriginal culture.

Trevorrow was a contributor to Indigenous Traditions and Ecology: The Interbeing of Cosmology and Community (ed. John Allen Grim, 2001).

== Collections and displays ==
Trevorrow's works are held by many museums, including the National Gallery of Australia and the Art Gallery of South Australia.

A woven fish, a Murray cod ("Pondi"), created by Trevorrow and Jelina Haines, is hung from the ceiling on level 8 of the Department for Infrastructure and Transport in Adelaide, where the theme is Lakes/Rivers – "Pangka Pari Winaityinaityi" in Kaurna.

== Recognition and impact ==
Trevorrow was profiled in an episode of the 2016 television series about Ngarrindjeri culture, Everything is Connected, and appeared in the 2013 documentary Ringbalin: Breaking the Drought, about a pilgrimage by Aboriginal elders to summon rain.

In June 2025 Trevorrow was a finalist for the Female Elder of the Year award in the NAIDOC Awards.

She is honoured by being the subject of the 2025 Icon exhibition at JamFactory in Adelaide, titled Weaving through Time. The Icon series is a solo exhibition that celebrates the achievements of an influential South Australian crafts-based media artist each year.

Trevorrow has taught and passed on her skills in traditional weaving to others, including Ngarrindjeri, Narungga, and Kaurna artist and curator Carly Tarkari Dodd.

Kaurna / Ngarrindjeri poet Dominic Guerrera, winner of the 2021 Oodgeroo Noonuccal Indigenous Poetry Prize, wrote in his poem "Blak Excellence":

she has built a legacy

a line of strong women

following one stitch at a time

yes she is the greatest living artist in south australia

== Personal life ==
She married Tom Trevorrow in 1976, and they had seven children. Tom became the chairman of the Ngarrindjeri Regional Authority in 2011, and died in 2013. He co-managed Camp Coorong with his wife.

Trevorrow is also known as "Aunty Ellen". The Murray cod (Pondi) is her totem.
