= Field, South Australia =

Suburb of Coorong District Council, South Australia

Field
- Suburb
- Coordinates: 35°49′26″S 139°39′50″E
- Country: Australia
- State: South Australia
- Region: Murray and Mallee
- LGA: Coorong District Council
- Location: 139 km (86 mi) SE of Adelaide; 61 km (38 mi) SE of Tailem Bend.
- Established: 24 August 2000

Government
  - State electorate: MacKillop
  - Federal division: Barker

Population
  - Total: 83 (SAL 2021)
- Time zone: UTC+9:30 (ACST)
  - Summer (DST): UTC+10:30 (ACST)
- Postcode: 5265
- County: Buccleuch; Cardwell; Russell
- Mean max temp: 20.8 °C (69.4 °F)
- Mean min temp: 10.3 °C (50.5 °F)
- Annual rainfall: 469.2 mm (18.47 in)
Suburbs around Field
Meningie	Meningie East; Coonalpyn	Coonalpyn
Meningie; Coroong	Field	Coonalpyn; Tintinara
Coroong	Colebatch	Tintinara

Field is a locality in the Australian state of South Australia located in the state's south-east about 139 kilometres (86 mi) south-east of the state capital of Adelaide and about 61 kilometres (38 mi) south-east of the municipal seat in Tailem Bend.

Its boundaries were created on 24 August 2000. Its name is derived from the cadastral unit of the Hundred of Field.

The majority land use within Field is ’primary production’ and is concerned with “agricultural production.” Some land in its south-east corner which is occupied by the Mount Boothby Conservation Park is zoned for ‘conservation’.

Field is located within the federal division of Barker, the state electoral district of MacKillop and the local government area of the Coorong District Council.
