= Hundred of Santo =

Santo
- Cadastral division
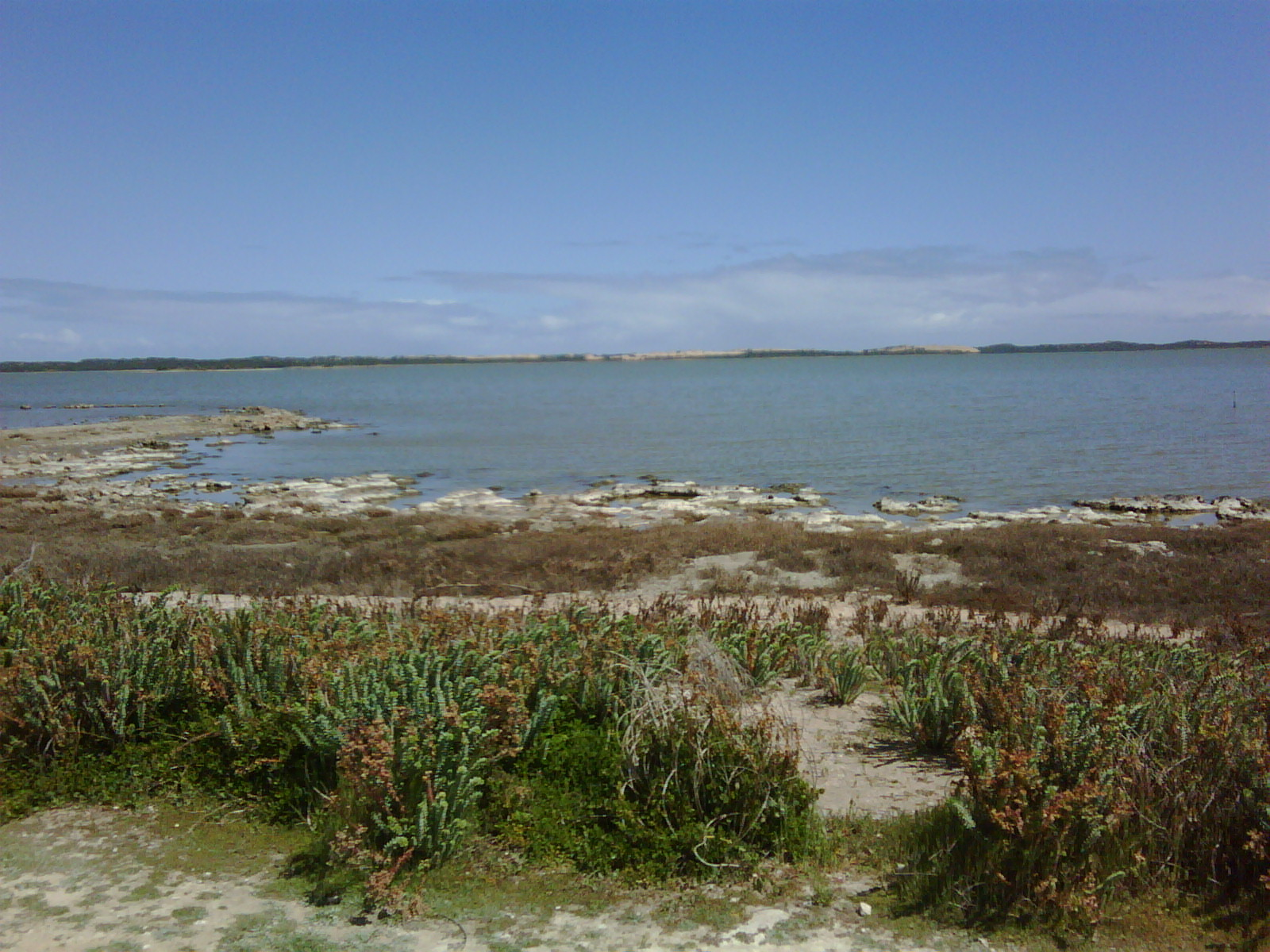
- The Coorong, Hundred of Santo

- Coordinates: 36.135°S 139.665°E
- Country: Australia
- State: South Australia
- Established: 3 November 1864

Area
  - Total: 273 km^{2} (105.5 sq mi)
- County: Cardwell
Lands administrative divisions around Santo
Glyde	Glyde	Field
	Santo	Messent
	Neville	Neville

The Hundred of Santo is a cadastral hundred of the County of Cardwell (South Australia), centred on the rural locality of Salt Creek, South Australia. It was proclaimed by Governor Dominick Daly in 1864 and named for Philip Santo, a member of the South Australian parliament in the 1860s and 1870s.

The Hundred is located in the Limestone Coast south east of Adelaide, South Australia.
