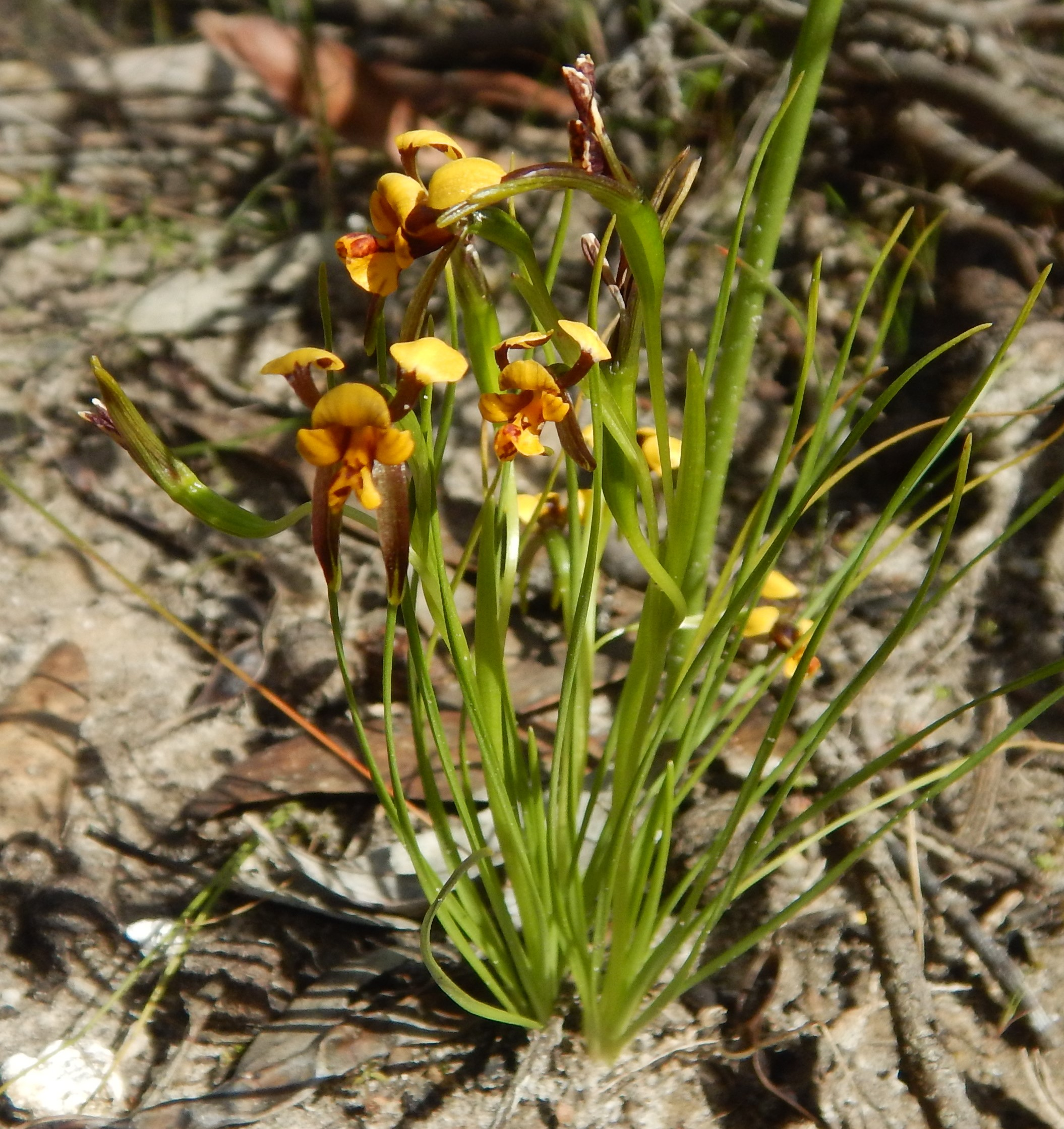
- Near Tintinara

Scientific classification
- Kingdom: Plantae
- Clade: Tracheophytes
- Clade: Angiosperms
- Clade: Monocots
- Order: Asparagales
- Family: Orchidaceae
- Subfamily: Orchidoideae
- Tribe: Diurideae
- Genus: Diuris
- Species: D. palustris

Binomial name
- Diuris palustris Lindl.

= Diuris palustris =

Swamp doubletail

Species of orchid

Diuris palustris, commonly known as the swamp doubletail or swamp diuris is a species of orchid which is endemic to south-eastern Australia. It has a tuft of between eight and ten twisted leaves and up to four yellow flowers with brown spots and blotches marks and blotches.

== Description ==
Diuris palustris is a tuberous, perennial herb with a tuft of between eight and ten twisted, linear leaves 100–300 mm (4–10 in) long, 4–6 mm (0.16–0.24 in) wide and folded lengthwise. Up to four flowers 15–20 mm (0.6–0.8 in) wide are borne on a flowering stem 50–150 mm (2–6 in) tall. The flowers are yellow with dark brown spots and blotches. The dorsal sepal is erect, curved backwards near the tip, egg-shaped, 7–10 mm (0.3–0.4 in) long and 5–6 mm (0.20–0.24 in) wide. The lateral sepals are green, 12–15 mm (0.5–0.6 in) long, about 2 mm (0.08 in) wide, turned downwards and parallel to each other. The petals are erect to curved backwards, with an egg-shaped blade 4–6 mm (0.16–0.24 in) long and 3–4 mm (0.1–0.2 in) wide on a dark reddish brown stalk 3–4 mm (0.1–0.2 in) long. The labellum is 7–10 mm (0.3–0.4 in) long and has three lobes. The centre lobe is spatula-shaped, 3–4 mm (0.1–0.2 in) wide and the side lobes are erect, oval, 4–6 mm (0.16–0.24 in) long and 2–3 mm (0.08–0.1 in) wide with rounded teeth near the tip. There are two ridged calli 4–5 mm (0.16–0.20 in) long in the mid-line of the labellum. Flowering occurs from August to October.

== Taxonomy and naming ==
Diuris palustris was first formally described in 1840 by John Lindley and the description was published in his book, The Genera and Species of Orchidaceous Plants. The specific epithet (palustris) is a Latin word meaning "marshy" or "boggy".

== Distribution and habitat ==
The swamp doubletail is found in New South Wales, Victoria, Tasmania and South Australia where it is most common. It grows in moist or wet soil in forest, Callitris woodland and grassland.

== Conservation ==
Diuris palustris is classed as "vulnerable" under the Victorian Flora and Fauna Guarantee Act 1988 and as "endangered" under the Tasmanian Threatened Species Protection Act 1995.
