= Coorong, South Australia =

Coorong
- Suburb
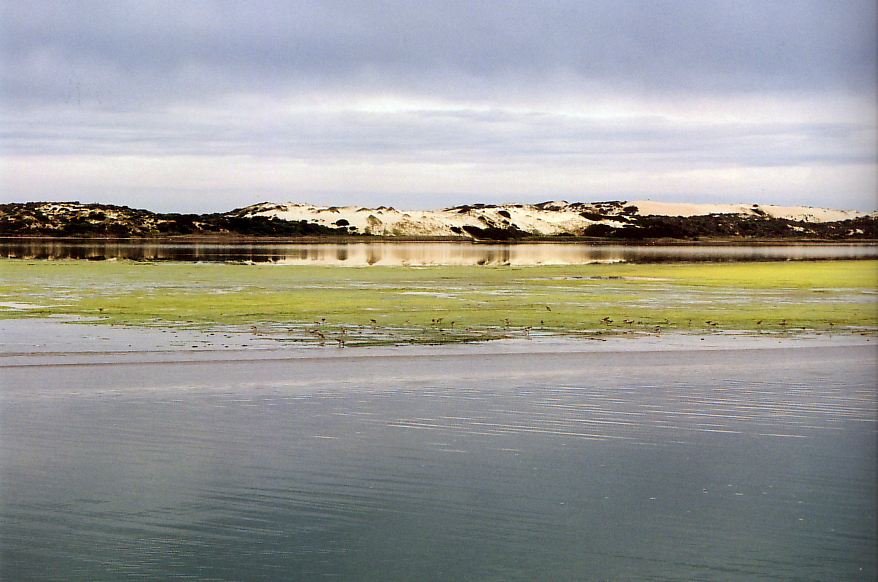
- View across the Coorong lagoon towards sandhills on Younghusband Peninsula

- Coordinates: 36°07′S 139°36′E
- Country: Australia
- State: South Australia
- Region: Murray and Mallee; Limestone Coast (north to south)
- LGA: Coorong Kingston (north to south)
- Location: 80 km (50 mi) SE of Adelaide
- Established: 1998

Government
  - State electorate: MacKillop
  - Federal division: Barker

Population
  - Total: 53 (SAL 2021)
- Time zone: UTC+9:30 (ACST)
  - Summer (DST): UTC+10:30 (ACST)
- Postcode: 5264
- County: Russell; Cardwell; MacDonnell (north to south)
- Mean max temp: 20.8 °C (69.4 °F)
- Mean min temp: 10.3 °C (50.5 °F)
- Annual rainfall: 468.3 mm (18.44 in)
Suburbs around Coorong
See Surrounding localities

Coorong is a locality in the Australian state of South Australia which is associated with the lagoon known as the Coorong in the south-east of the state and which overlooks the continental coastline from the mouth of the Murray River about 80 kilometres (50 miles) south-east of the state capital of Adelaide to the immediate north of the town of Kingston SE extending for a distance of at least 140 kilometres (87 mi).

It extends from the Murray Mouth in the north to the northern end of the Paranki Lagoon in the south including:

- the following bodies of water with the Murray River system - Port Pullen, Coorong Channel, the Tauwitchere Channel and the full extent of the Coorong lagoon system,
- the following major islands - Bird, Ewe, Long, Mud and Tauwitchere
- the full extent of the Younghusband Peninsula
- a parcel of land of an area of 267 square kilometres (103 sq mi) located between the localities of Meningie and Salt Creek and
- land between the Coorong Lagoon and the Paranki Lagoon.

The boundaries of the locality were created firstly for the part within the Kingston District Council in 1998 and secondly for the part within the Coorong District Council in 2000 including the Villa De Yumpa Shack Site. The name is reported as being derived from the lagoon of the same name. The boundary with the locality of Hindmarsh Island was altered in 2014 to move Bird Island, an island located north-east of the Murray Mouth, into the locality of Coorong.

The principal land use in Coorong is conservation with the majority of the land being occupied by the Coorong National Park and the Mud Islands Game Reserve.

The locality includes the following state heritage places: Magrath Flat Homestead, Teeluc Cottage and White Hut Cottage

Coorong is located within the federal Division of Barker, the state electoral district of MacKillop and the local government areas of the Kingston District Council and the Coorong District Council. It is also located in the cadastral counties of Russell, Cardwell and MacDonnell (from north to south) and the South Australian Government regions of Murray and Mallee and Limestone Coast (from north to south).

== Surrounding localities ==
Coorong is bounded in the sector from the west to the south by the body of water known in Australia as the Southern Ocean and by international authorities as the Great Australian Bight and bounded from the north-west to the south-east by the following localities gazetted under the South Australian Geographical Names Act 1991:

- Northwest: Hindmarsh Island, Goolwa South
- North: Mundoo Island
- Northeast: Lake Alexandrina
- East: Narrung, Meningie West, Meningie, Field, Colebatch, Deepwater, Salt Creek, Tilley Swamp, Taratap, West Range
- Southeast: West Range
- South: ocean
- Southwest: ocean
- West: ocean
