= Gum Lagoon Conservation Park =

Protected area in South Australia

- IUCN category VI (protected area with sustainable use of natural resources)
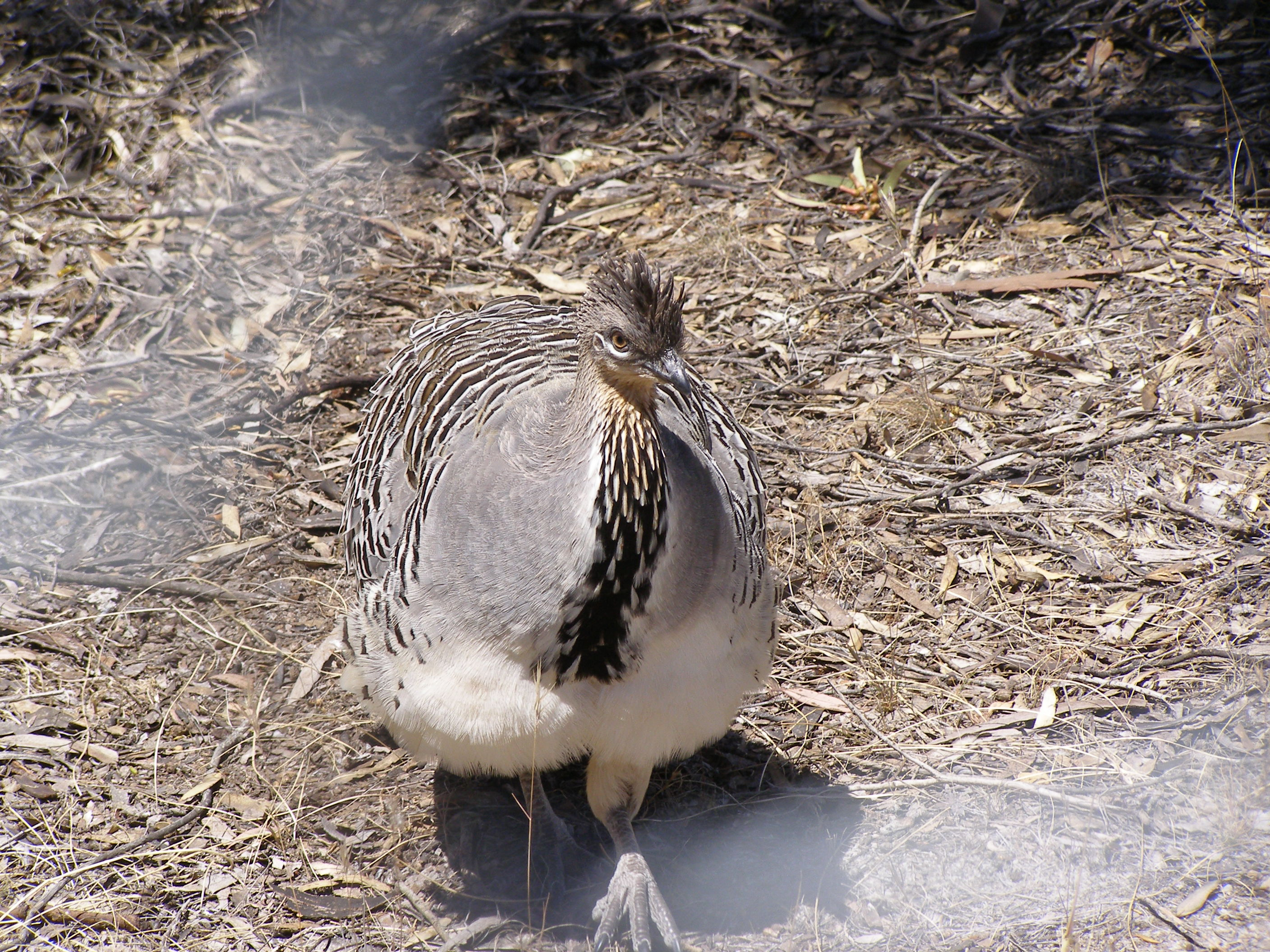
- The conservation park has a "significant Malleefowl population".

- Location within South Australia
- Location: South Australia
- Nearest city: Keith
- Coordinates: 36°16′04″S 140°04′24″E
- Area: 89.06 km^{2} (34.39 sq mi)
- Established: 20 August 1970
- Governing body: Department for Environment and Water

Gum Lagoon Conservation Park (formerly the Gum Lagoon National Park) is an 8765 ha protected area about 40 km south-west of Keith in the Limestone Coast region of South Australia. It lies about 20 km inland from the southern end of the Coorong. It contains an isolated block of mallee woodland important for malleefowl conservation.

== History ==
Some 2700 ha formed the core of the reserve when it was originally proclaimed as Gum Lagoon National Park in August 1970. It became the Gum Lagoon Conservation Park in 1972 upon the proclamation of the National Parks and Wildlife Act 1972. It gradually expanded in area through subsequent ad hoc and opportunistic land acquisitions.

== Description ==
The conservation park is located on land in the gazetted localities of Laffer, Petherick and Tilley Swamp.

It contains ranges of calcarenite dunes and interdunal flats, with slow-moving surface water drainage systems and blocks of remnant vegetation. The vegetation includes tea-tree scrub, wet heathland and mallee woodland. The main feature of the conservation park is the Duck Island Watercourse which runs along a wide interdunal flat studded with ephemeral swamps and isolated sandhills. The average annual rainfall is 500 mm.

The conservation park is classified as an IUCN Category VI protected area. In 1980, it was listed on the now-defunct Register of the National Estate.

== Flora and fauna ==
The conservation park's vegetation includes Banksia ornata shrubland, Melaleuca brevifolia low shrubland, Eucalyptus arenacea open woodland and Eucalyptus diversifolia open mallee, while the wetter areas are characterised by red gum woodland and aquatic herblands.

Eleven floristic communities have been identified, containing 375 indigenous plants, including four which are nationally threatened or rare. Native animal species include 12 mammals, 19 reptiles, five amphibians and 141 birds. Also recorded are 62 exotic plants, eight feral mammals and five introduced birds.

=== Birds ===
The conservation park has been identified by BirdLife International as an Important Bird Area, principally because it supports an apparently sustainable population of the vulnerable malleefowl, with an estimated population of 13–14 nesting mounds. The biome-restricted purple-gaped honeyeater has also been recorded.
