= County of Cardwell (South Australia) =

Cardwell South Australia
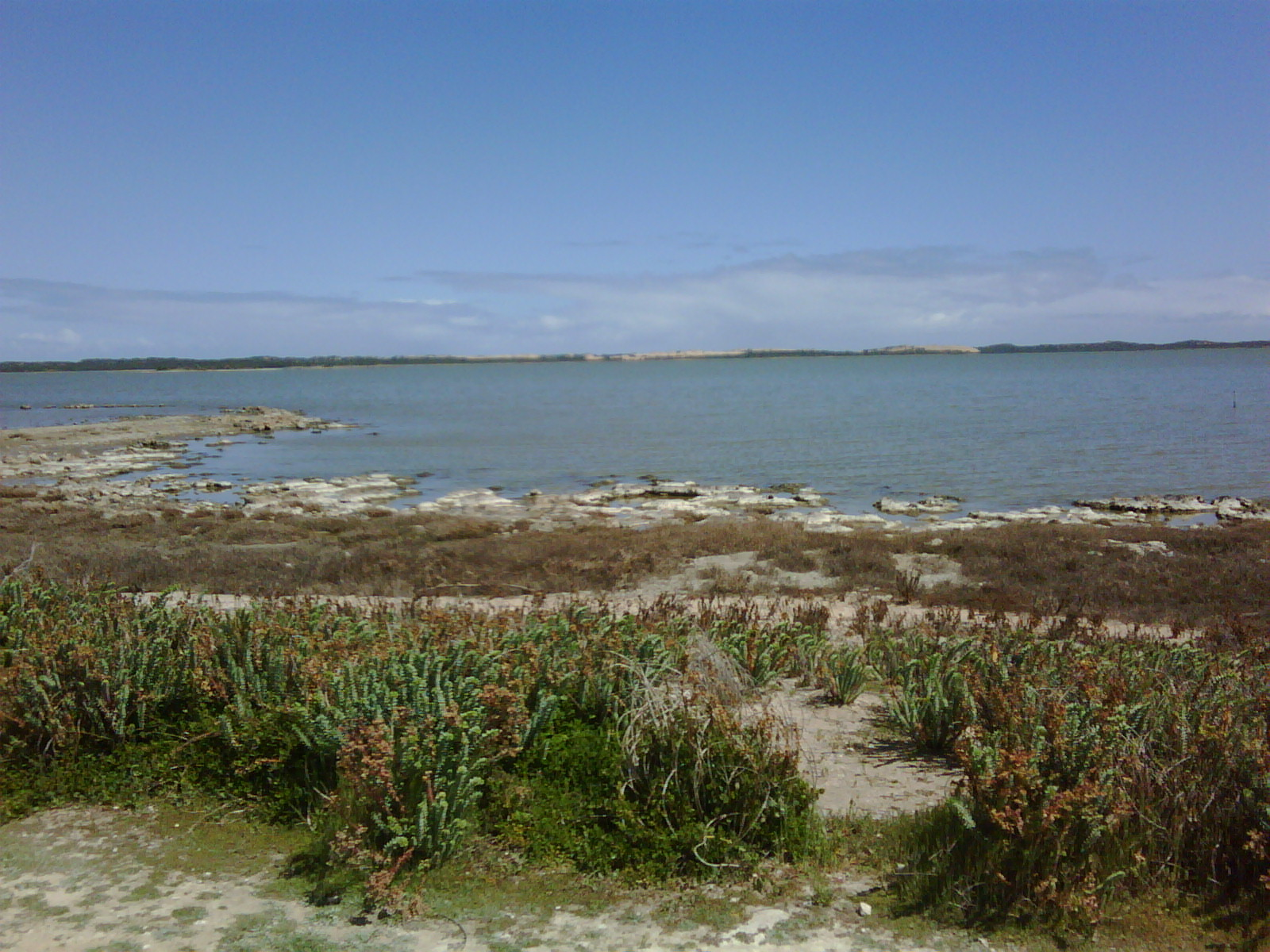
- The Coorong, a coastal lagoon, near Salt Creek in the Hundred of Santo

- Coordinates: 36°08′11″S 139°55′49″E
- Established: 1864
- LGA(s): Coorong District Council; Tatiara District Council; Kingston District Council
- Region: Murray and Mallee; Limestone Coast
Lands administrative divisions around Cardwell:
Russell	Buccleuch	Chandos
Ocean	Cardwell	Buckingham
Ocean	MacDonnell	MacDonnell

The County of Cardwell is one of the 49 cadastral counties of South Australia. It was proclaimed by Governor Dominick Daly in 1864 and named for Edward Cardwell, 1st Viscount Cardwell, who was appointed Secretary of State for the Colonies in the same year. It is located south east of Lake Albert abutting the coastline along the southern portion of the Coorong coastal lagoon. This includes the southern half of the contemporary local government area of the Coorong District Council and smaller parts of the Tatiara District and Kingston District council areas.

== Hundreds ==
The County of Cardwell is divided into the following 12 hundreds:

- Hundred of Glyde (Coorong)
- Hundred of Field (Field, Colebatch)
- Hundred of Colebatch (Colebatch)
- Hundred of Richards (Tintinara)
- Hundred of Coombe (Tintinara, Coombe)
- Hundred of Santo (Salt Creek)
- Hundred of Messent (Deepwater)
- Hundred of McNamara (Bunbury)
- Hundred of Laffer (Mount Charles, Laffer)
- Hundred of Neville (Tilley Swamp)
- Hundred of Wells (Tilley Swamp)
- Hundred of Petherick (Petherick)
