= Laffer, South Australia =

Laffer
- Suburb
- Coordinates: 36°10′31″S 140°08′44″E
- Country: Australia
- State: South Australia
- Region: Limestone Coast
- LGA: Tatiara District Council
- Location: 199 km (124 mi) SE of Adelaide; 57 km (35 mi) SE of Bordertown.
- Established: 24 August 2000

Government
  - State electorate: MacKillop
  - Federal division: Barker

Population
  - Total: 48 (2016 census)
- Time zone: UTC+9:30 (ACST)
  - Summer (DST): UTC+10:30 (ACST)
- Postcode: 5267
- County: Cardwell
- Mean max temp: 22.9 °C (73.2 °F)
- Mean min temp: 8.0 °C (46.4 °F)
- Annual rainfall: 408.1 mm (16.07 in)
Suburbs around Laffer
Bunbury	Mount Charles	Keith
Bunbury	Laffer	Keith
Tilley Swamp	Petherick	Willalooka
- Locations; Adjoining localities

Laffer is a locality in the Australian state of South Australia located in the state's south-east about 199 kilometres (124 mi) south-east of the state capital of Adelaide and about 57 kilometres (35 mi) west of the municipal seat in Bordertown.

Its boundaries were created on 24 August 2000. Its name is derived from the cadastral unit of the Hundred of Laffer which it occupies along with the locality of Mount Charles.

Land use within Laffer is ’primary production’. This includes land at the locality's southern boundary which is occupied by the protected area known as the Gum Lagoon Conservation Park.

The 2016 Australian census which was conducted in August 2016 reports that Laffer had a population of 48 people.

Laffer is located within the federal division of Barker, the state electoral district of MacKillop and the local government area of the Tatiara District Council.
