= Mount Boothby Conservation Park =

Park in South Australia

- IUCN category Ia (strict nature reserve)
- Location within South Australia
- Location: South Australia, Field
- Nearest city: Culburra
- Coordinates: 35°50′26″S 139°46′37″E
- Area: 40.93 km^{2} (15.80 sq mi)
- Established: 30 November 1967
- Visitors: “few visitors” (in 1999)
- Governing body: Department for Environment and Water

Mount Boothby Conservation Park, formerly the Mount Boothby National Park, is a protected area in the Australian state of South Australia located in the locality of Field about 147 kilometres (91 mi) south-east of the state capital of Adelaide and about 14 kilometres (8.7 mi) west of the Culburra town centre on the Dukes Highway.

The conservation park consists of land in section 3 of the cadastral unit of the Hundred of Colebatch.

The land first received protected area status as a national park proclaimed under the National Parks Act 1966 on 30 November 1967. On 27 April 1972, the national park was reconstituted as the Mount Boothby Conservation Park under the National Parks and Wildlife Act 1972. The conservation park was named after its predecessor and ultimately after Mount Boothby, a hill located within its boundaries and with a height of 129 metres (423 ft). As of 2019, it covered an area of 40.93 square kilometres (15.80 sq mi).

In 1980, the conservation park was described as follows:

Mount Boothby Conservation Park covers a rolling calcarenite range with an undulating sand flat in the northeast and several small granite outcrops. The dominant plant association on the range is Eucalyptus diversifolia / E. incrassata / E. foecunda open scrub with a sparse to mid-dense heath understorey. Open heath occupies the sand flat and small trees of E leucoxylon surround the granite outcrops. A low woodland of E fasciculosa above a heath understorey occupies a small area in the southeast. Emus and western grey kangaroos are conspicuous…

The park is relatively unmodified, though minor clearing of the vegetation has been undertaken by apiarists…

Melaleuca wilsonii and Hakea muellerana which are rare plants in South Australia… are fairly common in the park. Leipoa ocellata (mallee fowl) which is a threatened bird in SA… and the attractive Pseudomys apodemoides (ash-grey mouse) are seldom seen residents. Another feature of the park is the great variety of orchids which are best observed in September and early October…

The flora of the conservation park includes Caladenia tensa (rigid spider orchid), a species listed nationally as "endangered".

The conservation park is classified as an IUCN Category Ia protected area. In 1980, it was listed on the now-defunct Register of the National Estate.

== See also ==
- Protected areas of South Australia
