= Tilley Swamp, South Australia =

Tilley Swamp
- Suburb
- Coordinates: 36°20′37″S 139°49′22″E
- Country: Australia
- State: South Australia
- Region: Limestone Coast
- LGA: Kingston District Council
- Location: 199 km (124 mi) south-east of Adelaide; 55 km (34 mi) north of Kingston SE
- Established: 3 December 1998

Government
  - State electorate: MacKillop
  - Federal division: Barker

Population
  - Total: 27 (2016 census)
- Time zone: UTC+9:30 (ACST)
  - Summer (DST): UTC+10:30 (ACST)
- Postcode: 5267
- County: Cardwell
- Mean max temp: 22.3 °C (72.1 °F)
- Mean min temp: 8.0 °C (46.4 °F)
- Annual rainfall: 408.1 mm (16.07 in)
Suburbs around Tilley Swamp
Coorong	Salt Creek; Deepwater; Bunbury	Laffer
Coorong	Tilley Swamp	Petherick
Coorong	Taratap; Keilira	Keilira
- Locations; Adjoining localities

Tilley Swamp is a locality in the Australian state of South Australia located in the state's south-east about 199 kilometres (124 mi) south-east of the state capital of Adelaide and about 55 kilometres (34 mi) north of the municipal seat of Kingston SE. The 2016 Australian census, which was conducted in August 2016, reports that the area had a population of 27 people.

Tilley Swamp is located within the federal division of Barker, the state electoral district of Mackillop and the local government area of the Kingston District Council.

== History ==
Tilley Swamp's name and boundaries were assigned on 3 December 1998. Its name is derived from the swamp of the same name, which itself is derived either from “Thomas Tilley, Manager of Glencoe Run” or William Tilley, an early pastoral leaseholder.

A brief history of Tilley Swamp was compiled by the South Australian historian Geoffrey Manning:

... It lies 48 km north of Kingston, SE and the Aborigines knew the district as kopanopintar - kopan - ‘one’ and pintar - ‘stone axe’. On 1 July 1851, William Tilley took up pastoral lease no. 199 (previously an occupation licence issued to him on 22 April 1847 and known as ‘Miserable Creek’) calling it ‘Tilley’s Swamp; he sold out to James Thompson in February 1854. A sketch of pastoral lease no. 1181 showing the location of the home station, together with numerous waterholes is reproduced opposite. H.C. Talbot talks of ‘Tilley’s Accommodation House’ conducted by William Tilley and that it was ‘one of the stages on the Overland Road to the Victorian diggings…’ and is shown as such on early pastoral lease maps. Tilley Swamp School opened in 1958 and closed in 1965. Rodney Cockburn attributes its nomenclature to Thomas Tilley ‘who succeeded John McIntyre as manager for the Leake brothers at Glencoe. ‘Later he joined George Ormerod in pastoral partnership which included a lease of the Avenue Range run and other properties…

== Land use ==
The principal land use in the locality is "primary production", although some land has been granted protected area status under the National Parks and Wildlife Act 1972 as the Gum Lagoon Conservation Park in the locality's north-east corner and as the Tilley Swamp Conservation Park in the locality's south-west.
