= Tintinara Tennis Club =

Tennis facility in Tintinara, South Australia

Coordinates: 35°52′56″S 140°03′31″E

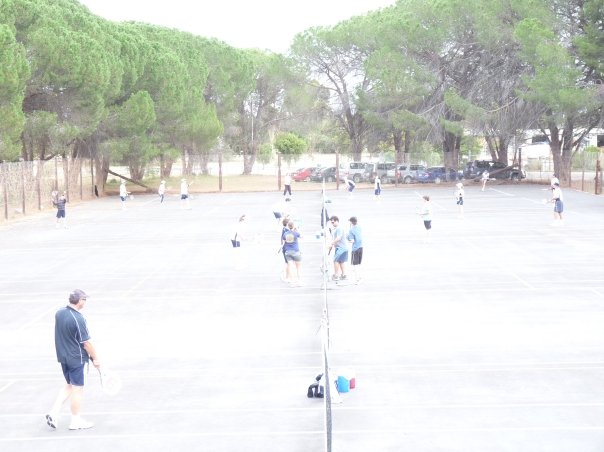
Tintinara Tennis Courts 2009 Grand Final

The Tintinara Tennis Club was established in 1919 in Tintinara, South Australia by Edward B. Northcott and Fanny and Tilly Williams. Its original membership was about 40.

The facilities once consisted of two courts that were used for many years. In the summer of 1951–52, four new courts were introduced. Since then, more courts have been added, and a new clubhouse was completed in 1966. As of May 2010, the club has 6 courts and the clubhouse.
