= Lake Indawarra =

- Location within Australia
- Location: Murray Mallee, South Australia, Australia
- Coordinates: 35°53′18.3″S 140°3′34.3″E
- Type: artificial lake

Lake Indawarra is an artificial lake, created as a rubble pit for railway construction, in the town of Tintinara in the Murray Mallee region of South Australia. The lake was created by railroad workers in 1905 as a railway reservoir and was given its name in the 1980s. It is an important part of Tintinara's identity, a popular place for picnics, camping, swimming and canoeing.

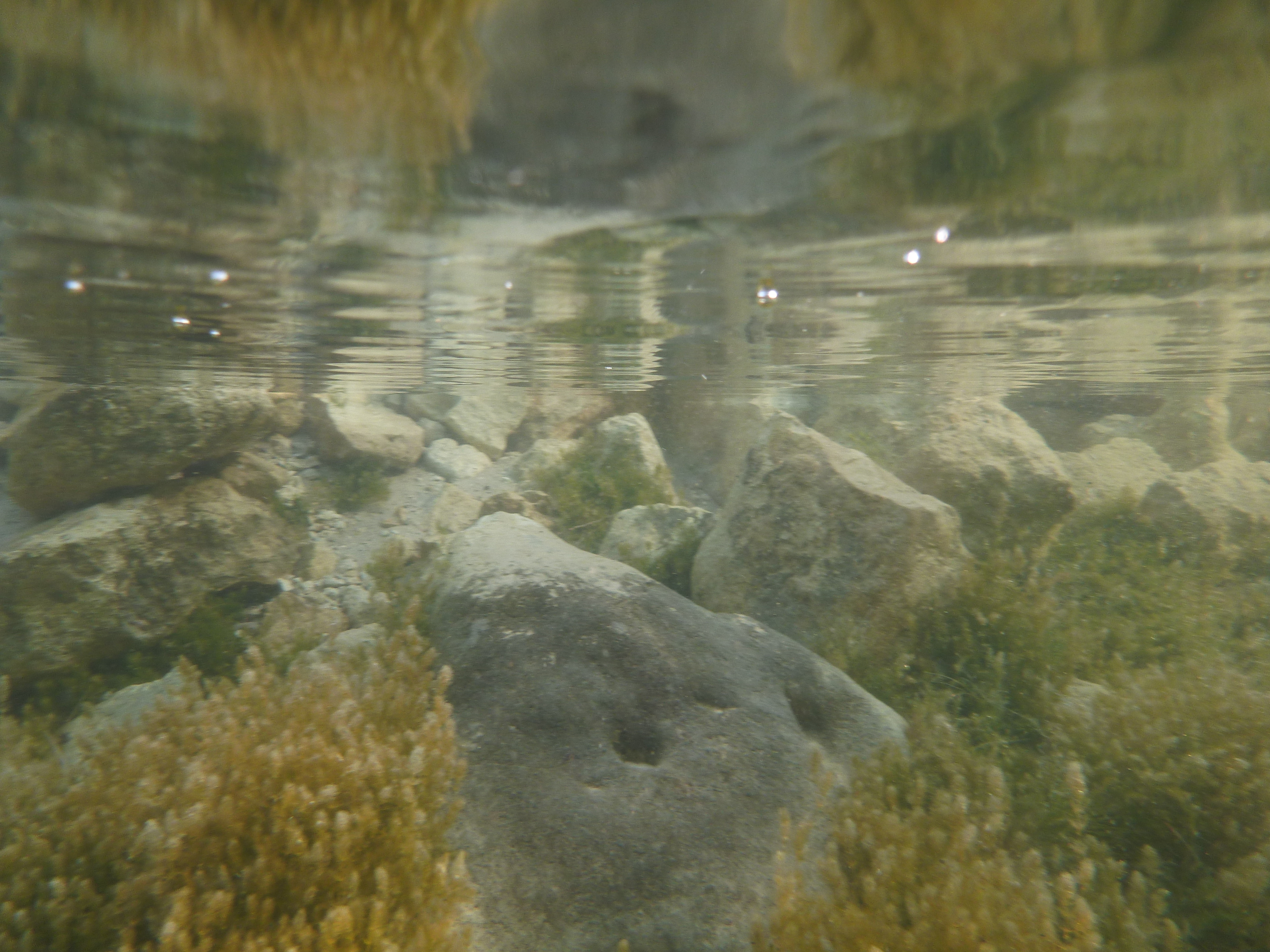
The banks of Bird Island, from underwater.

== Etymology ==
The lake was named after a small competition was held by the local council whereby the local student body of Tintinara chose the name. Unlike the town name, Indawarra is a made-up variation of local aboriginal words.

== Pollution and cleanup ==
In the early 1990s the lake filled in with sulfur rich sediment. As the lake was no longer appealing, visitors to the area started dumping their rubbish in it. The lake started drying out in summer, smelling, and habitat to mosquito larvae.

In 2007, the school and various community groups decided to clean out the lake. Local community members dug out a portion of the built up sediment. Local school students planted trees and built picnic spots on one day a week. A small island was built in the middle of the lake and named it "Bird Island".

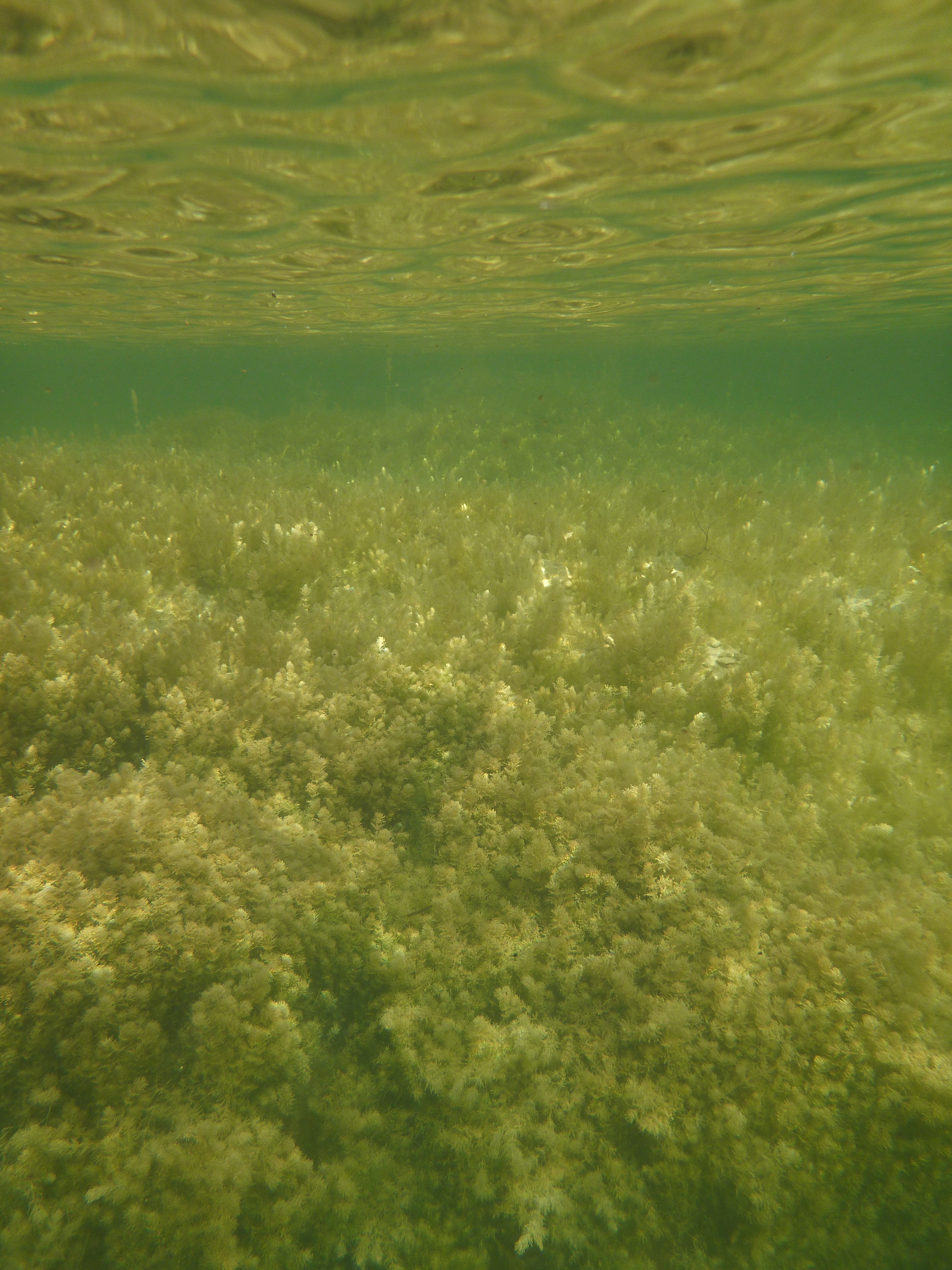
Stonewort Meadow, Lake Indawarra, South Australia

Lake Indawarra is now a suitable place for water sports again, including kayaking and snorkeling. There is a range of aquatic plants and algae establishing across the lake floor and plenty of damselfly larvae. There are also ducks breeding on Bird Island. Near the lake, there is a free campsite and there are plans for further work to clean up and reintroduce fish to the waterbody.
