= Bunbury, South Australia =

Bunbury
- Suburb
- Coordinates: 36°09′29″S 139°57′18″E
- Country: Australia
- State: South Australia
- Region: Murray and Mallee
- LGA: Coorong District Council
- Location: 190 km (120 mi) SE of Adelaide; 104 km (65 mi) SE of Tailem Bend.
- Established: 24 August 2000

Government
  - State electorate: MacKillop
  - Federal division: Barker

Population
  - Total: 3 (SAL 2021)
- Time zone: UTC+9:30 (ACST)
  - Summer (DST): UTC+10:30 (ACST)
- Postcode: 5266
- County: Cardwell
- Mean max temp: 22.9 °C (73.2 °F)
- Mean min temp: 8.0 °C (46.4 °F)
- Annual rainfall: 408.1 mm (16.07 in)
Suburbs around Bunbury
Tintinara	Tintinara	Mount Charles
Deepwater	Bunbury	Mount Charles; Laffer
Tilley Swamp	Tilley Swamp	Petherick

Bunbury is a locality in the Australian state of South Australia located in the state’s south-east about 190 kilometres (120 mi) south-east of the state capital of Adelaide and about 104 kilometres (65 mi) south-east of the municipal seat in Tailem Bend.

Its boundaries were created on 24 August 2000. Its name is derived from the Bunbury Homestead which is located within the locality’s boundaries.

The majority land use within Bunbury is ’primary production’ which is concerned with “agricultural production.” Some land extending from its centre to its western boundary which is occupied by the Bunbury Conservation Reserve is zoned for ‘conservation’.

Bunbury is located within the federal division of Barker, the state electoral district of MacKillop and the local government area of the Coorong District Council.
