= Petherick, South Australia =

Petherick South Australia
- Coordinates: 36°21′50″S 140°08′50″E
- Population: 33 (2016 census)
- Established: 24 August 2000
- Postcode(s): 5267
- Time zone: ACST (UTC+9:30)
  - Summer (DST): ACST (UTC+10:30)
- Location: 211 km (131 mi) SE of Adelaide; 55 km (34 mi) W of Bordertown.
- LGA(s): Tatiara District Council
- Region: Murray and Mallee
- County: Cardwell
- State electorate(s): MacKillop
- Federal division(s): Barker
| Mean max temp | Mean min temp | Annual rainfall |
| 22.9 °C; 73 °F | 8.0 °C; 46 °F | 408.1 mm 16.1 in |
Suburbs around Petherick:
| Bunbury | Laffer | Keith |
| Tilley Swamp | Petherick | Willalooka |
| Keilira | Keilira | Marcollat |
- Footnotes: Locations; Adjoining localities

Petherick is a locality in the Australian state of South Australia located in the state’s south-east about 211 kilometres (131 mi) south-east of the state capital of Adelaide and about 55 kilometres (34 mi) west of the municipal seat in Bordertown.

Its boundaries were created on 24 August 2000 and align with those of the cadastral unit of the Hundred of Petherick from which its name is derived. The hundred itself was named after Vernon Petherick, a former member of the South Australian Parliament.

The majority land use within Petherick is ’primary production’. Land in the locality’s north-west corner occupied by the protected area known as the Gum Lagoon Conservation Park includes zonings for both ‘conservation’ and ‘primary production’.

Didicoolum station is located in the locality of Petherick.

The 2016 Australian census which was conducted in August 2016 reports that Petherick had a population of 33 people.

Petherick is located within the federal division of Barker, the state electoral district of MacKillop and the local government area of the Tatiara District Council.
