= Hundred of Laffer =

The Hundred of Laffer is a Hundred of the County of Cardwell (South Australia) centered on Laffer, South Australia. It is in the Limestone Coast region south east of Adelaide, South Australia.
