= Murray Mouth =

Intersection of the River Murray and Southern Ocean

Coordinates: 35°35′00″S 138°53′00″E

Murray mouth
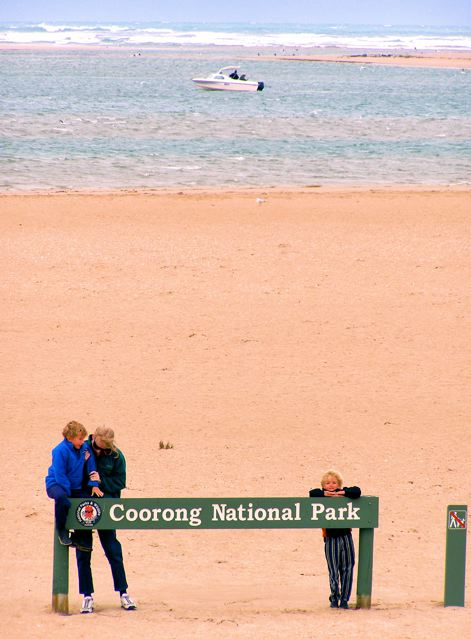
- The narrow Murray Mouth in the background as viewed from Hindmarsh Island, November 2006

- Location within South Australia
- Location: Australia
- River sources: Murray River
- Basin countries: Australia
- Average depth: 2.4 m (7.9 ft) as of 1985

Murray Mouth is the point at which the Murray River meets the Southern Ocean. The Murray Mouth's location is changeable. Historical records show that the channel out to sea moves along the sand dunes over time. At times of greater river flow and rough seas, the two bodies of water would erode the sand dunes to create a new channel leaving the old one to silt and disappear over time.

== Description ==
The mouth of the Murray River is about 10 kilometres (6.2 miles) south east of Goolwa and about 75 kilometres (47 miles) south-south-east of the Adelaide city centre in the gazetted localities of Coorong and Goolwa South. The mouth is an opening in the coastal dune system which separates the river system from the ocean and which extends from near Goolwa in a south-easterly direction along the continental coastline for about 145 kilometres (90 miles). The mouth divides the dune system into two peninsulas. The peninsula on the west side is Sir Richard Peninsula which terminates at the mouth with a point named Pullen Spit. The peninsula on the east side is Younghusband Peninsula which terminates at the mouth with a point known in some sources as Sleepy Hollow.

Water flows throughout the mouth from two directions. Firstly, the flow from the west passes along a passage known as the Goolwa Channel which is bounded by Hindmarsh Island to its north side. Secondly, the flow from the east passes along a passage known as the Coorong Channel. The Coorong Channel itself is fed by the Mundoo Channel which passes between Hindmarsh Island and Mundoo Island to the north, and by the Tauwitchere Channel to the east.

== Natural history ==
From the Pleistocene about 2.5 million years ago, the Murray River terminated in a freshwater lake called Lake Bungunnia which included the area now occupied by the South Australia/New South Wales border. The lake drained less than a million years ago, creating the current course. It was suggested that the Murray may have taken a different course to the ocean, via Burra, South Australia and emptied into the Spencer Gulf, before being 'defeated' by the rise of the Mt Lofty Ranges. This has been studied by analysing the uplift date of the Mt Lofty Ranges and other geological data and found that this was not likely to be the case.

== History ==
=== European discovery and use ===
During expeditions in 1829–30, Charles Sturt explored the Murray and its westward-flowing tributaries, finding that the mouth of the Murray was barely navigable to shipping. During the later 19th century with the discovery of gold, and the development of sheep and wheat farming along the Murray and its tributaries, the river became a major thoroughfare for the carriage of goods and produce. During the peak period of Murray River commerce (roughly 1855 to 1920) and before the development of rail and road transport, the Murray Mouth with its complex and unpredictable interaction between shallow, shifting and variable currents and the open sea, presented a major impediment to traffic between Adelaide and the Murray settlements, and many vessels foundered or were wrecked there.

== Water flow ==
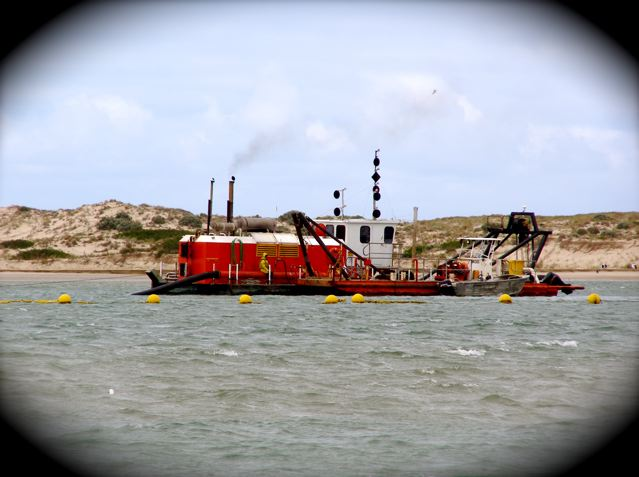
Dredging the Murray Mouth. View from Hindmarsh Island

River Murray water is used by farmers for irrigation in four of Australia's states, as well as supplying water to most towns along the river, and many further away through various pipelines. It has been widely accepted that too much water is being extracted; however business and political concerns make it difficult to remedy the problem. A visible symptom of the over-extraction of river water is the closing of the Murray Mouth.

From October 2002 until 2010 dredges operated at the Murray Mouth. Between 2002 and 2006, two dredges operated moving sand from the channel to maintain a minimal flow from the sea and into the Coorong's lagoon system. Without the 24-hour dredging, the mouth was at risk of becoming silted and closing, cutting the supply of fresh seawater into the Coorong, which would then warm up, stagnate and die.

In mid-2006 dredging was scaled back as a result of the improved conditions at the mouth. Now only one dredge operates, and permission was granted to one commercial operator to navigate the channel between Goolwa and the Coorong, passing the mouth. This operation finished in 2010.

Dredging resumed in January 2015 to late 2016, and again in November 2023.

Dredging continues at a cost between $3m to $6m annually.

== Protected area status and other arrangements ==
=== Australian government ===
The Murray Mouth is immediately adjoined on its northern and eastern sides by the boundary of the Coorong and Lakes Alexandrina and Albert Wetland Ramsar site.

=== South Australian government ===
The Murray Mouth is located within a special purpose area within the Encounter Marine Park and is immediately adjoined on its northern and eastern sides by the boundary of the Coorong National Park.

=== Non-statutory arrangements ===
The Murray Mouth is adjoined on its northern and eastern sides by the boundary of the Coorong Important Bird Area which is an area considered by Birdlife International to be a place of ‘international significance for the conservation of birds and other biodiversity.’

== See also ==
- Coorong, Lower Lakes and Murray Mouth (CLLMM) Research Centre, a water research centre in Goolwa run by the Goyder Institute for Water Research

== Citations and references ==
=== References ===
- Boating Industry Association of South Australia (BIA); South Australia. Department for Environment and Heritage (2005), South Australia's waters an atlas & guide, Boating Industry Association of South Australia, ISBN 978-1-86254-680-6
- South Australia. Department of Marine and Harbors (DMH) (1985), The Waters of South Australia a series of charts, sailing notes and coastal photographs, Dept. of Marine and Harbors, South Australia, ISBN 978-0-7243-7603-2
- "Encounter Marine Park Management plan summary" (PDF). Department of Environment, Water and Natural Resources (DEWNR). 2012.
