= Deepwater, South Australia =

Deepwater South Australia
- Coordinates: 36°08′20″S 139°49′59″E
- Population: 12 (SAL 2021)
- Established: 24 August 2000
- Postcode(s): 5266
- Time zone: ACST (UTC+9:30)
  - Summer (DST): ACST (UTC+10:30)
- Location: 190 km (118 mi) SE of Adelaide; 104 km (65 mi) SE of Tailem Bend.
- LGA(s): Coorong District Council
- Region: Murray and Mallee
- County: Cardwell
- State electorate(s): MacKillop
- Federal division(s): Barker
Mean max temp	Mean min temp	Annual rainfall
22.9 °C; 73 °F	8.0 °C; 46 °F	408.1 mm 16.1 in
Suburbs around Deepwater:
Coroong	Colebatch; Tintinara	Tintinara
Salt Creek	Deepwater	Tintinara; Bunbury
Tilley Swamp	Tilley Swamp	Tilley Swamp

Deepwater is a locality in the Australian state of South Australia located in the state’s south-east about 190 kilometres (120 mi) south-east of the state capital of Adelaide and about 104 kilometres (65 mi) south-east of the municipal seat in Tailem Bend.

Its boundaries were created on 24 August 2000. Its name is derived from the Deepwater Homestead which is located within the locality’s boundaries.

The majority land use within Deepwater is ’primary production’ which is concerned with “agricultural production.” This includes some land on the locality’s western side which is included in the protected area known as the Martin Washpool Conservation Park. Some land in the north which is occupied by the Messent Conservation Park is zoned for ‘conservation’.

Deepwater is located within the federal division of Barker, the state electoral district of MacKillop and the local government area of the Coorong District Council.
