= Younghusband Peninsula =

Younghusband Peninsula South Australia
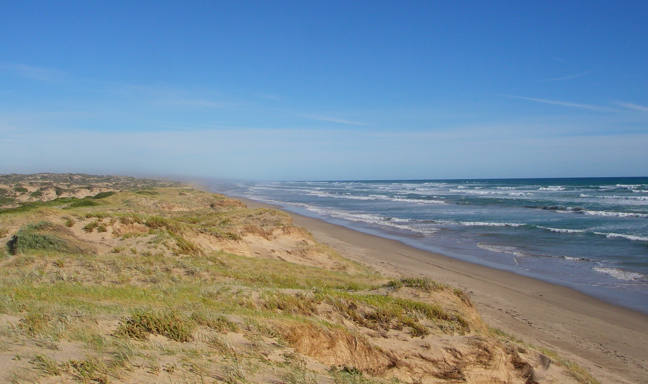
- The ocean side of the Younghusband Peninsula is a popular area for fishing

- Coordinates: 35°35′8″S 138°57′18″E

Younghusband Peninsula is a long narrow peninsula in South Australia. It separates the Coorong Channel, the Tauwitchere Channel and the Coorong which are part of the estuary of the River Murray from the Southern Ocean which including water bodies such as Encounter and Lacepede Bays. It lies entirely within the Coorong National Park. The peninsula is over 110 kilometres (68 mi) long, but less than 3 kilometres (1.9 mi) wide at its widest point. Its narrowest point is less than 350 metres (1,150 ft) wide. The Younghusband Peninsula, together with the Sir Richard Peninsula on the western side of the Murray Mouth, are the coastal dune system that forms the continental coastline from near Goolwa in the north west to about 35 kilometres (22 miles) north of Kingston SE in the south east. Younghusband Peninsula was named after William Younghusband, M.P.
