= County of Russell =

Russell
- Cadastral division
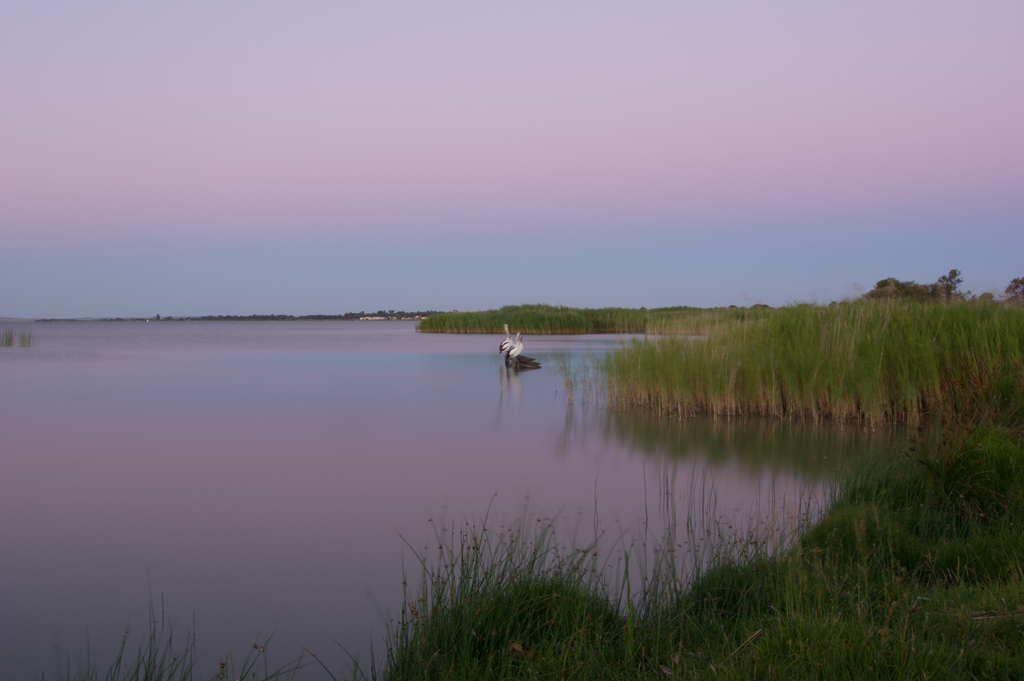
- Pelicans on Lake Albert at Meningie in the Hundred of Bonney

- Coordinates: 35.45°S 139.47°E
- Country: Australia
- State: South Australia
- LGA(s): Coorong District Council City of Murray Bridge
- Established: 2 June 1842

Area
  - Total: 3,427 km^{2} (1,323 sq mi)
Lands administrative divisions around Russell
Sturt	Sturt	Albert
Ocean	Russell	Buccleuch
Ocean	Cardwell	Cardwell

The County of Russell is one of the 49 cadastral counties in South Australia. It was proclaimed in 1842 by Governor George Grey and named for Lord John Russell, who was involved in the early development of the (British) South Australian colony (at the time of the county's proclamation) when he was Secretary of State for War and the Colonies. It covers a portion of the state bounded to the west by the eastern half of Lake Alexandrina and the section of the Murray River extending to Bowhill in the north and bounded to the south by the coastline adjoining the Coorong coastal lagoon and fully surrounds Lake Albert which is excluded from its extent. This includes the north western quarter of the contemporary local government area of Coorong District Council.

== Hundreds ==
The County of Russell is divided into the following 9 hundreds:

- Hundred of Younghusband (Younghusband)
- Hundred of Burdett (Burdett)
- Hundred of Ettrick (Ettrick)
- Hundred of Seymour (Tailem Bend)
- Hundred of Malcolm (Wellington East, Ashville)
- Hundred of Coolinong (Cooke Plains)
- Hundred of Baker (Narrung, Coorong)
- Hundred of Bonney (Meningie)
- Hundred of Jeffries (Meningie East)
