= Coorongite =

Viscous substance of plant origin found mainly in Australia

Coorongite is a brown, viscous, hydrocarbon, somewhat similar in character to elaterite, of plant origin, found in Australia. It is not a mineral, but has its origin in the desiccated remains of the freshwater chlorophyte alga called Botryococcus braunii, and is combustible. Historical names for similar substances found in other parts of the world include balkashite, n'hangellite, and marahunite.

Initially it was thought to have been a source of oil for petroleum, and excited some interest in its potential for use as fuel, but interest waned as the facts became known. In recent years there has been some interest in its potential for use in the production of biofuel.

== History ==
Coorongite was first found in 1852 (Note: Also reported as 1865.) at Alfred's Flat, inland from Salt Creek on the Coorong, a mostly freshwater lagoon in South Australia. Some observers thought that this was formed by oil seepage, owing to its viscous nature and combustibility, and it led to exploratory sampling. Early debate about its origins was published in local newspapers such as The South Australian Register, The Adelaide Observer and The South Australian Chronicle & Weekly Mail. The finding led to the first Australian oil exploration well being drilled at Alfred Flat.

Botanist and geologist Ralph Tate (1840–1901) considered it to be of plant origin. South Australian government geologist H. Y. L. Brown wrote in his 1893 Catalogue of South Australian Minerals, that coorongite had been "found on the surface of a swamp on sand, in patches resembling pieces of dried leather. Although this substance is of a very similar composition to elaterite (mineral caoutchouc) there is a doubt as to its being a mineral". It is not the same substance nor of the same origin as elaterite. Reinhardt Thiessen (1923), a palaeobotanist at the U.S. Geological Survey, reported that there had been much discussion about the substance among scientists, and suggested that its origin was a mass of plant origin. His paper also gave a detailed description of the chemistry of coorongite. He did not identify the precursor alga, but did recognise the link between coorongite and torbanite.

Its origins and possible uses were a topic of great interest to geologists and others interested in a source of oil for petroleum, both within Australia and abroad.

It has since been discovered as being derived from algae, specifically, the desiccated remains of the freshwater chlorophyte alga called Botryococcus braunii. The alga had undergone significant microbial or bacterial degradation. It has been posited that it may be a precursor of torbanite (a type of oil shale). Two separate deposits were found at the Coorong as far apart as 100 years, suggesting that it was formed by an unusual set of circumstances: "a curio, an aberration or an erratic event in the normal cycle of events".

Australian geologist and Antarctic explorer Sir Douglas Mawson did extensive field work on coorongite and other sapropelic deposits in the Coorong and at Lake Albert in January 1938, February 1940, and January 1941, although only published one study in 1938.

A 1989 study looked at coorongite collected on the shores of the Darwin River Reservoir in the Northern Territory, where Botryococcus braunii B race grows profusely. The authors concluded that torbanite cannot be derived from Coorongite, because although "torbanite and some coorongites derive from a common algal source, they clearly show distinct structures, as a result of markedly different conditions of early diagenesis of the Botryococcus biomass". Torbanite is characterised by well-separated fossil colonies, while coorongite is not.

== Occurrence ==
In South Australia, coorongite has been found around the edges of freshwater lagoons and swamps, along the shoreline of ephemeral lakes on the Coorong coastal plain, in subaqueous acid sulphate soils from locations on the shore of Lake Albert, as well as offshore from Point McLeay in Lake Alexandrina. It has also been found in the Murray Lagoon on Kangaroo Island.

In the Northern Territory of Australia, coorongite occurs in the Darwin River Reservoir.

Substances very similar to coorongite had other historical names, depending upon the location of the deposits, such as n'hangellite from Portuguese East Africa (now Mozambique), marahunite from Brazil, and balkashite in Siberia.

== Uses ==
It was reported that Aboriginal people of the Coorong sometimes used coorongite as fuel for lighting, and that balkashite was used as a source of fuel by a tribe of Turkestan.

Coorongite is now regarded as a potential intermediate in the production of biofuel.
