= Salt Creek, South Australia =

Salt Creek South Australia
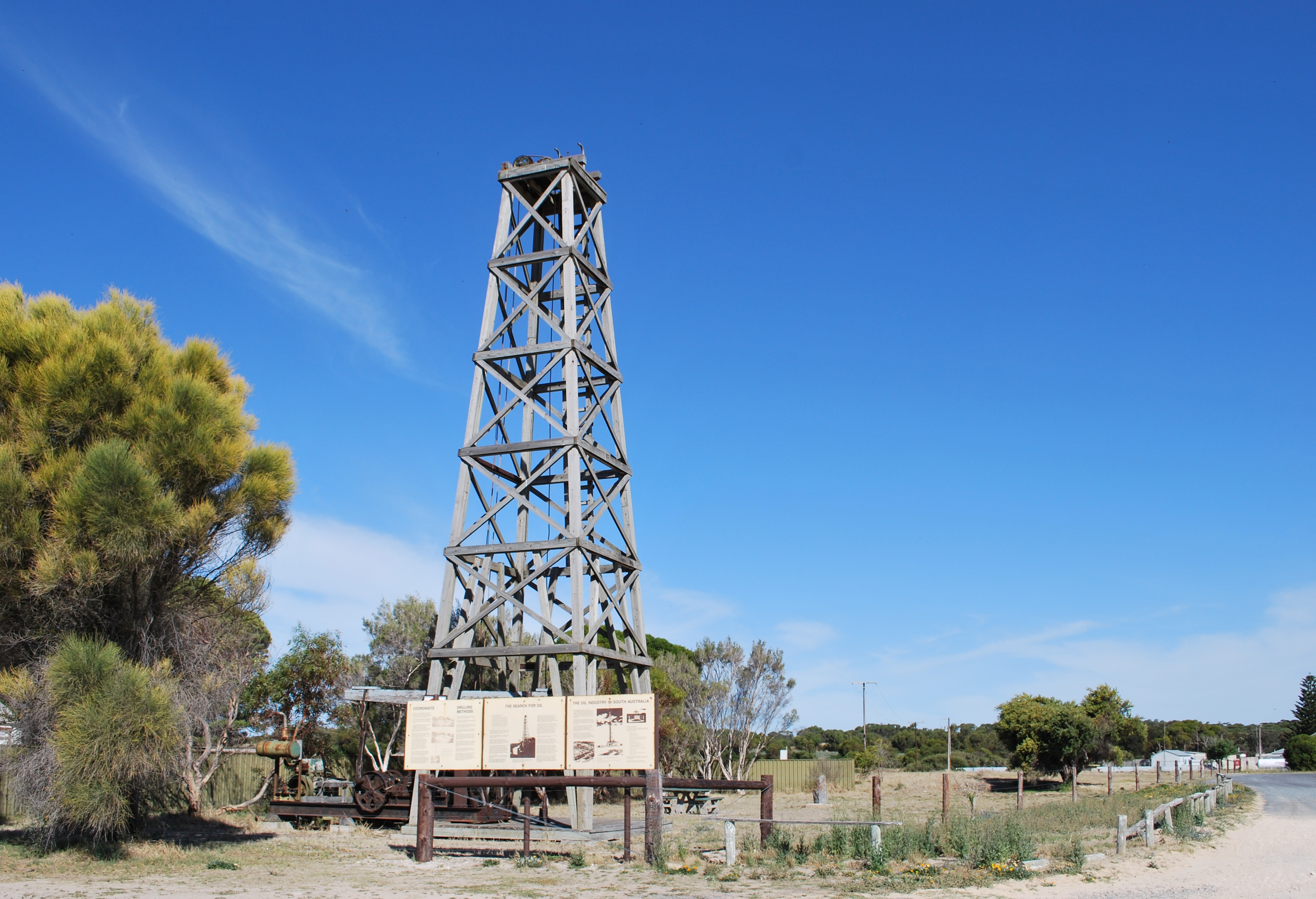
- Oil drill monument

- Coordinates: 36°07′39″S 139°38′53″E
- Population: 32 (SAL 2021)
- Established: 24 August 2000
- Postcode(s): 5264
- Time zone: ACST (UTC+9:30)
  - Summer (DST): ACST (UTC+10:30)
- Location: 164 km (102 mi) SE of Adelaide; 86 km (53 mi) north-west of Kingston SE; 58 km (36 mi) south-east of Meningie
- LGA(s): The Coorong District Council
- Region: Murray and Mallee
- County: Cardwell
- State electorate(s): MacKillop
- Federal division(s): Barker
Mean max temp	Mean min temp	Annual rainfall
20.8 °C; 69 °F	10.3 °C; 51 °F	469.2 mm 18.5 in
Localities around Salt Creek:
Coorong	Coorong	Colebatch
Coorong	Salt Creek	Deepwater
Coorong	Tilley Swamp	Tilley Swamp
- Footnotes: Adjoining localities

Salt Creek is a small settlement in South Australia, located along the Coorong, and is also the location of the Coorong National Park Information Centre.

== History ==
The following brief history of Salt Creek was compiled by the South Australian historian Geoffrey Manning:

... There is another Salt Creek, 61 km South-East of Meningie and, 'early in 1866, Mr John Hodgkiss and others formed a small company with a capital of £500 to test the value of a supposed discovery of petroleum made near the notorious Malacha Martin’s house on the Salt Creek, by Mr W.H. Hamilton': Four men were sent out with 500 feet of boring rods and the oily substance which he had described as scum upon the surface of the water was traceable in various parts of the creek. Extensive claims were taken out and a company was formed to work a substance known as mineral caoutchouc and Mr Eustace R. Mitford was dispatched there.

Boundaries for the locality were created on 24 August 2000 for the " long established name" which is ultimately derived from a stream that flows through the locality on its way to the Coorong.

== Oil rig monument ==
In 1892, a group of entrepreneurs, who believed there was oil located in the Coorong, drilled Australia's first oil well, based on the discovery of an elastic substance which was dubbed coorongite. They were unsuccessful, as it was later discovered that the "oil" was in fact a flammable, compacted vegetable substance, derived from algae. A replica of the oil rig has been built as a monument to this enterprise.

== People from Salt Creek ==
In 2017 the authorities discovered two young women who were kidnapped by a Salt Creek local by the name of Roman Heinze. Both girls were from overseas one was Brazilian and one was German. They were kept as sex slaves and they managed to escape and alert authorities.

== References in literature ==
The novel Salt Creek by Lucy Treloar is set in the Coorong at Salt Creek in the 1850s and 1860s. It includes references to the Travellers' Rest Inn, to William and Catherine Robinson, the proprietors, and to Malachi Martin, and the real life murders committed by Martin.

== Governance ==
Salt Creek is located within the federal division of Barker, the state electoral district of MacKillop and the local government area of the Coorong District Council.
