= Sir Richard Peninsula =

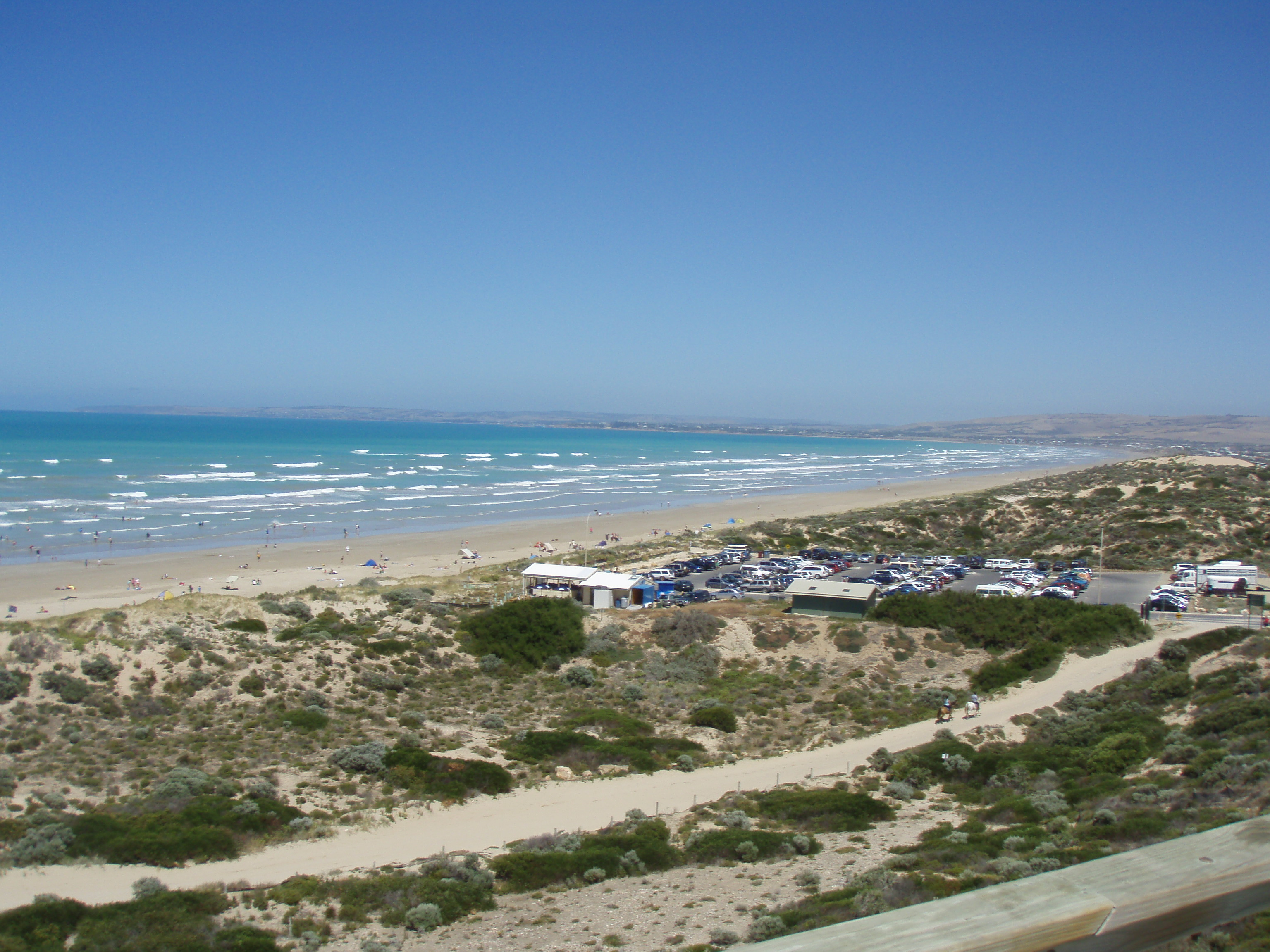
- Goolwa Beach

- Coordinates: 35°32′25″S 138°50′21″E
- Country: Australia
- State: South Australia

Sir Richard Peninsula is a narrow peninsula consisting of sand which extends from Goolwa, South Australia to the Murray Mouth. It separates the Goolwa Channel, which is part of the estuary of the River Murray, from Encounter Bay. It is approximately 10 kilometres (6.2 mi) in length and ranges from 500 metres (1,600 ft)to 1 kilometre (0.62 mi) in width. The peninsula, together with the Younghusband Peninsula on the eastern side of the Murray Mouth, is the primary sand dune line defining this stretch of the Australian coastline.

Sir Richard Peninsula was named after Richard Graves MacDonnell, the sixth governor of South Australia, and is located within the gazetted locality of Goolwa South.
