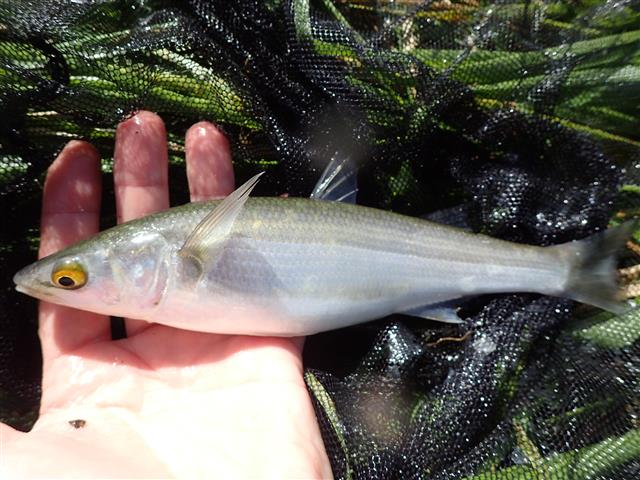

Conservation status
- Least Concern (IUCN 3.1)

Scientific classification
- Kingdom: Animalia
- Phylum: Chordata
- Class: Actinopterygii
- Order: Mugiliformes
- Family: Mugilidae
- Genus: Aldrichetta; Whitley, 1945
- Species: A. forsteri

Binomial name
- Aldrichetta forsteri (Valenciennes, 1836)

Synonyms
- Aldrichetta forsteri nonpilcharda Whitley, 1951; Mugil forsteri Valenciennes, 1836; Mugil albula Forster, 1801; Agonostoma diemensis (Richardson, 1840); Dajaus diemensis Richardson, 1840

= Yellow-eye mullet =

Species of fish

Yellow-eye mullet (Aldrichetta forsteri), are small, near-shore fish found in temperate waters of southern Australia from just north of Sydney, New South Wales to Shark Bay in Western Australia, around Tasmania, and New Zealand. Others names are Coorong mullet (after the Coorong area of South Australia), conmuri, estuary mullet, Forster's mullet, freshwater mullet, pilch, pilchard, Victor Harbor mullet, yelloweye and yellow-eyed mullet.

== Description ==
Yellow-eye mullet are small, near-shore fish that usually reach 30–40 cm (12–16 in). Yellow-eyed Mullet fish is grey-green at the top, silver at the bottom, yellow at the bottom, bright yellow eyes. Although yellow-eye fish tastes good, they are most often used as bait fish. Yellow-eye mullet is considered to be the best bait for capturing larger species. Freshly caught mullet fillets, oozing blood and juice, are irresistible to almost any fish in the sea. They also have sharp heads and mouths, and the scales on the body are particularly small and thin and are very easy to fall off. Unlike most fish, it has two dorsal fins, the first with 4 spines and the second with 1 spine and 9 rays. These fish are olive or blue-brown with silver on both sides and bright yellow or gold eyes. The fins have brown edges. They can live in water depth ranging from 0–50 m (0–160 ft), but usually, stay above 10 m (30 ft) depth. They are most comfortable in temperature ranging from 14 to 24 °C (57 to 75 °F), with the upper tolerate temperature of 28 °C (82 °F) and the lower limit unknown.

== Distribution ==
South-west Pacific; also Western Australia, South Australia, Victoria, and Tasmania; all over New Zealand and the Chatham Islands.

== Habitat ==
They usually live in shallow bays, ports and estuaries. They are often seen shoaling near the surface, but rarely enter freshwater. For example, Lake Ellesmere / Te Waihora, south of Christchurch, will be found at any time of the year, but their spawning takes place in the sea.

== Life cycle ==
The maximum age of yellow-eyed mullet is estimated to be seven years old. They lay their eggs between December and March, but some believe that spawning may also occur in winter. They usually lay their eggs in summer and autumn coastal waters or in the estuary. Each fish can release up to 680,000 eggs. They may live for seven years and mature in 2–4 years. Females grow faster and larger than males.

== Diet and foraging ==
They are omnivores that feed on sea floor debris, algae and small invertebrates, crustaceans, diatoms, molluscs, insect larvae, fish, polychaetes, coelenterates and fish eggs. They are often filtered from the sand through the mouth. Ingesting a certain percentage of sand helps to grind food in the muscles of the stomach.

== Predators ==
In the natural food chain, they are preyed by larger predators such as dolphins and orcas, and are a food source for humans.

== Uses ==
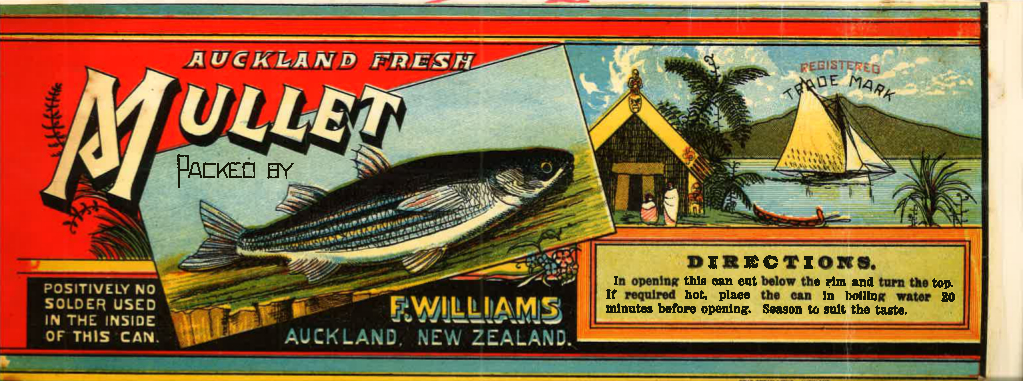
1889 canned mullet from New Zealand

They have two commercial uses. One is the marine beach fishery, where adult fish lay eggs for packaging as caviar. Demand is high in Australia and overseas. It can be sold fresh, or smoked or dried. Beach fences are used for this type of fishery. The second method of commercial fisheries in the estuary fishery, which accounts for the majority of mullet fish catches. Yellow-eye are caught throughout the year, but most of the capture occurs in late summer and autumn. Coastal collection gill nets and tunnel nets are the main gear forms used in the fishery. People usually look for shiny skin, solid meat, and a fresh marine scent when choosing fish. In the fillets, look for pink, grey, solid, shiny, moist meat without any brown markings or oozing water and a pleasant fresh marine scent.
