= Hundred of Petherick =

Coordinates: 36°21′07″S 140°08′36″E

The Hundred of Petherick is a Hundred of the County of Cardwell (South Australia) centred on Petherick, South Australia. It is in the Limestone Coast region southeast of Adelaide.
