= Meningie, South Australia =

Meningie
- Town
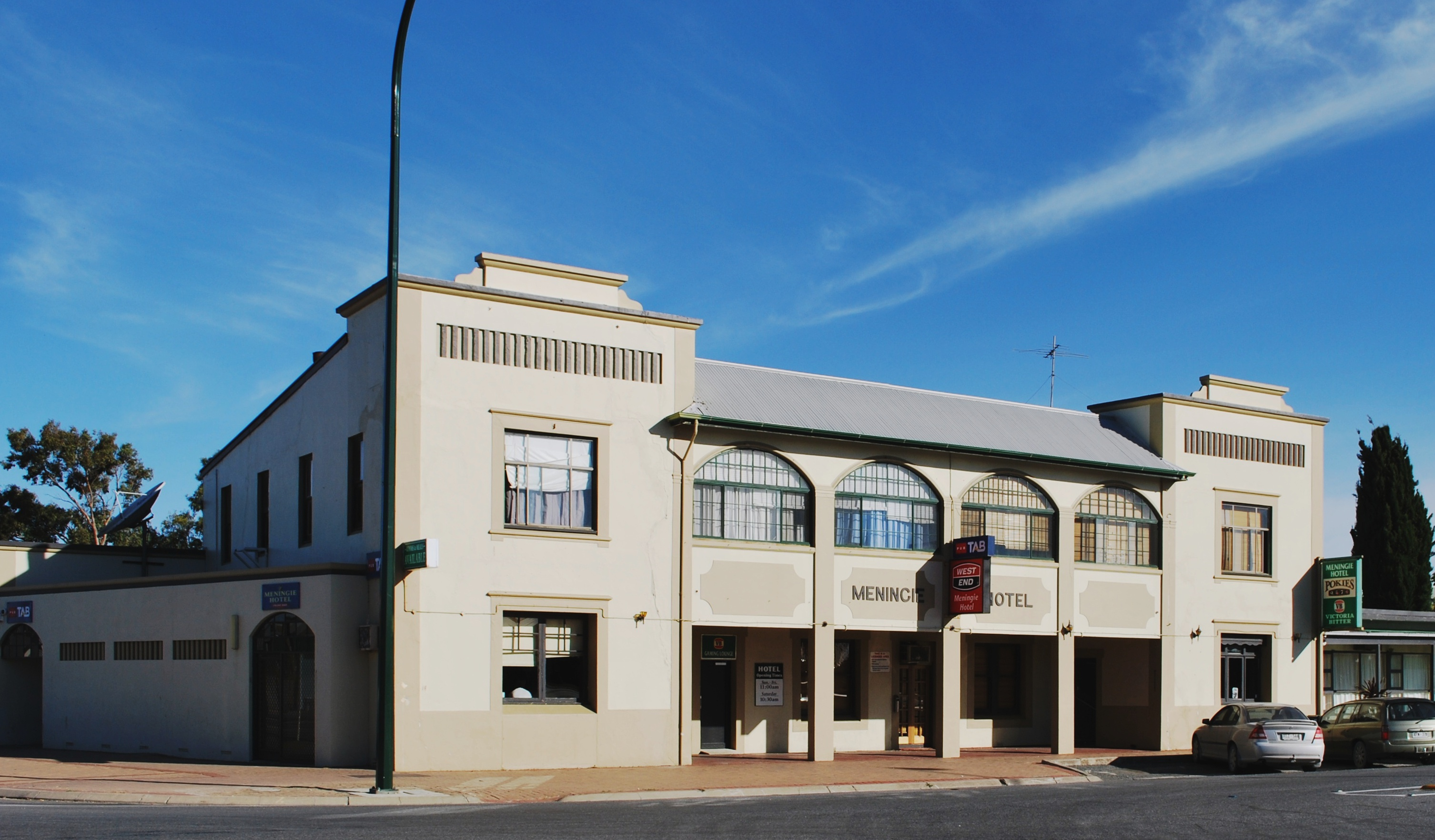
- Meningie Hotel

- Coordinates: 35°41′18″S 139°20′16″E
- Country: Australia
- State: South Australia
- Region: Murray and Mallee
- LGA: The Coorong District Council
- Location: 108 km (67 mi) SE of Adelaide; 49 km (30 mi) S of Tailem Bend
- Established: 1866 (town); 2000 (locality)

Government
  - State electorate: Mackillop
  - Federal division: Barker
- Elevation: 3 m (9.8 ft)

Population
  - Total: 860 (UCL 2021)
- Time zone: UTC+9:30 (ACST)
  - Summer (DST): UTC+10:30 (ACST)
- Postcode: 5264
- County: Russell
- Mean max temp: 20.9 °C (69.6 °F)
- Mean min temp: 10.3 °C (50.5 °F)
- Annual rainfall: 467.5 mm (18.41 in)
Localities around Meningie
Lake Albert	Waltowa	Meningie East
Lake Albert; Meningie West	Meningie	Meningie East; Field
Coorong	Coorong	Field; Coorong
- Location; Adjoining localities

Meningie (/məˈnɪŋɡi/ mə-NING-ghee) is a town on the south-east side of Lake Albert in South Australia. It is on the Princes Highway near The Coorong and was surveyed in 1866.

== History ==
The word Meningie is derived from "the Aboriginal word 'meningeng' meaning 'place of mud'".

The town was surveyed between March and June 1866 by W. Farquhar without any proclamation. Land was offered for sale on 23 August 1866. The name also was used for an "adjoining private subdivision of sections 104, 106/9 and 111" in the cadastral unit of the Hundred of Bonney.

A school was opened in 1869. A jetty was erected in 1867, with paddle steamers operating between Meningie and other ports on Lake Albert and Lake Alexandrina until 1927/1928. The town ceased to operate as a port in December 1936.

Boundaries for the locality were created for the "long established name" on 24 August 2000 and which include the Government Town of Meningie.

Meningie was the first place in Australia to have ADSL broadband installed without using a Telstra DSLAM. Agile Communications installed their own DSLAM in Meningie in October 2003, following on from having established a microwave network connecting to Adelaide in May 2001. Agile's associated internet service provider, Internode Systems offered services through this DSLAM.

== Climate ==
Meningie has a warm-summer mediterranean climate (Köppen: Csb), with warm, dry summers and mild, wetter winters. Mean maxima vary from 26.3 °C (79.3 °F) in February to 15.0 °C (59.0 °F) in July, while mean minima fluctuate between 14.2 °C (57.6 °F) in January and 6.8 °C (44.2 °F) in July. Annual precipitation is moderately low, averaging 467.5 mm (18.41 in) between 123.5 precipitation days. Despite this, the town has 61.0 clear days and 120.7 cloudy days per annum. Extreme temperatures have ranged from 46.1 °C (115.0 °F) on 24 January 2019 to −3.3 °C (26.1 °F) on 22 July 1972.

Climate data for Meningie (35º41'24"S, 139º20'24"E, 3 m AMSL) (1991–2020 normals, extremes 1966–present)
Month	Jan	Feb	Mar	Apr	May	Jun	Jul	Aug	Sep	Oct	Nov	Dec	Year
Record high °C (°F)	46.1 (115.0)	44.2 (111.6)	42.0 (107.6)	35.3 (95.5)	29.2 (84.6)	25.3 (77.5)	23.6 (74.5)	25.5 (77.9)	30.7 (87.3)	36.4 (97.5)	41.1 (106.0)	42.3 (108.1)	46.1 (115.0)
Mean daily maximum °C (°F)	26.6 (79.9)	26.4 (79.5)	24.6 (76.3)	21.9 (71.4)	18.3 (64.9)	15.8 (60.4)	15.1 (59.2)	16.2 (61.2)	18.5 (65.3)	21.1 (70.0)	23.6 (74.5)	25.0 (77.0)	21.1 (70.0)
Mean daily minimum °C (°F)	14.5 (58.1)	14.3 (57.7)	12.7 (54.9)	10.7 (51.3)	9.0 (48.2)	7.2 (45.0)	7.0 (44.6)	7.2 (45.0)	8.6 (47.5)	9.9 (49.8)	11.6 (52.9)	13.2 (55.8)	10.5 (50.9)
Record low °C (°F)	4.0 (39.2)	4.7 (40.5)	3.4 (38.1)	0.2 (32.4)	−0.4 (31.3)	−3.3 (26.1)	−2.5 (27.5)	−0.9 (30.4)	−0.1 (31.8)	−1.0 (30.2)	2.5 (36.5)	4.0 (39.2)	−3.3 (26.1)
Average precipitation mm (inches)	18.6 (0.73)	18.7 (0.74)	17.1 (0.67)	33.5 (1.32)	53.0 (2.09)	62.5 (2.46)	64.6 (2.54)	58.3 (2.30)	50.2 (1.98)	34.6 (1.36)	26.5 (1.04)	26.3 (1.04)	463.0 (18.23)
Average precipitation days (≥ 0.2 mm)	5.4	5.0	7.2	10.7	15.7	17.9	19.0	17.6	15.1	10.9	8.5	8.3	141.3
Average afternoon relative humidity (%)	52	52	55	59	66	72	71	65	63	57	54	54	60
Source: Australian Bureau of Meteorology (humidity 1991–2010)

== Tourism ==
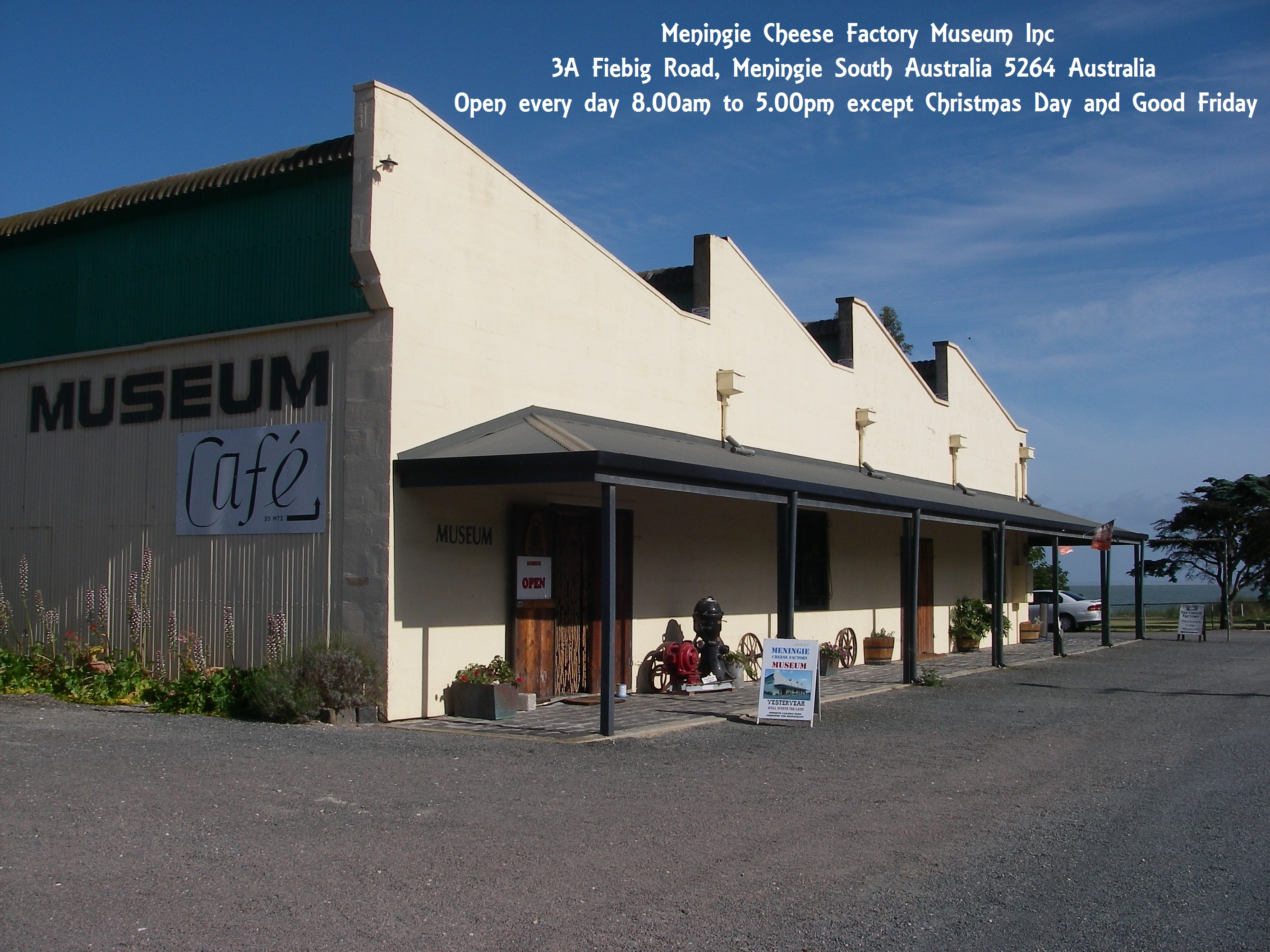
Meningie Cheese Factory Museum

Meningie has attractions and amenities for travellers and is the closest township to the Coorong National Park. The Lake provides visitors with many scenic locations and places to fish, swim, kayak, jet ski and water ski / wake-board. Bird watchers also enjoy coming to see the range of rare and vulnerable wildlife that the Lake and wetlands support. There are local 4WD tracks, bush walking trails, and indigenous cultural journeys at Camp Coorong. The Meningie Cheese Factory Museum is operated by volunteers, and serves as a local history museum and attraction. It is alongside the Cheese Factory Restaurant and the Lake Albert Caravan Park which is directly opposite.

In May 2013, a statue of an ostrich wearing a saddle was unveiled to commemorate the story of a local Irish bushranger, John Francis Peggotty, also known as "Birdman of the Coorong".

== Media ==
Meningie is home to The Lakelander, a regional community newspaper whose geographical coverage includes Tailem Bend, Salt Creek, Narrung, Coonalpyn and Tintinara. The newspaper, first issued on 25 June 1976, is published in a magazine format.

== Sports ==
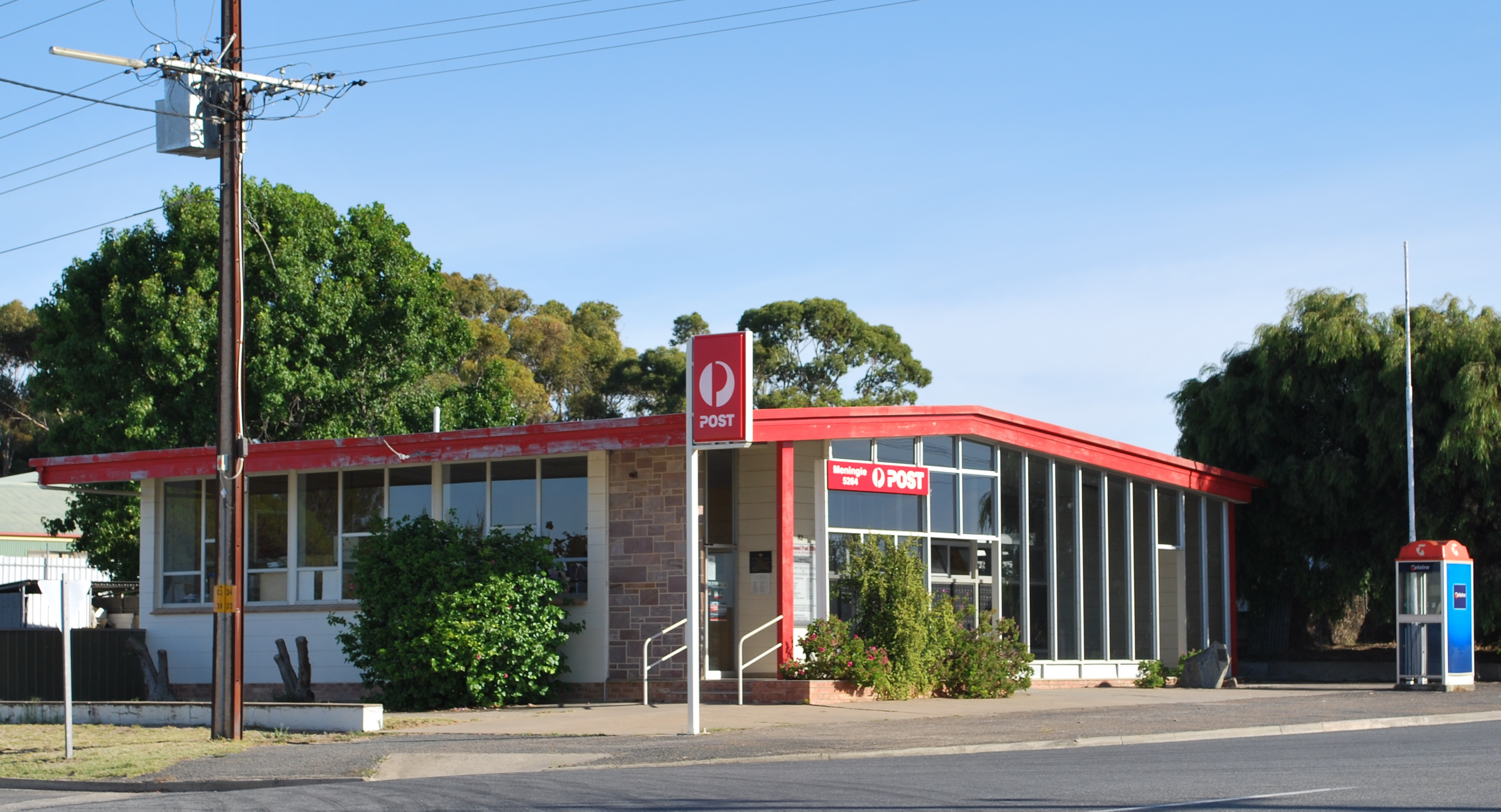
Meningie Post Office

Meningie has a strong sporting culture, and has a well maintained oval, a fully watered, par 72, 18-hole golf course, bike tracks/ motocross jumps, sailing club, and also an airstrip for gliders, light aircraft and balloons.

Meningie has a local Australian rules football club, founded around 1890, known as the Meningie Bears. On 12 December 2007, Meningie player Brodie Martin was rookie listed to Australian Football League (AFL) club Adelaide, becoming the first player from Meningie to be play for an AFL club. As of 2020 the league coach is Alex Scott.

Other sporting clubs in Meningie include the Meningie Motorcycle Club, Lake Albert Golf Club, Meningie Sailing Club, Meningie Bowling Club, Meningie Pony Club, Meningie Netball Club, Meningie Aero Club and Lake Albert Gun Club. There is also a Meningie Garden Club, Meningie & Districts Lions Club, and several church groups that meet regularly.

== Governance ==
Meningie is located within the federal division of Barker, the state electoral district of MacKillop, and the local government area of the Coorong District Council.
