= Colebatch, South Australia =

Colebatch South Australia
- Coordinates: 35°58′52″S 139°48′45″E
- Population: 56 (SAL 2021)
- Established: 24 August 2000
- Postcode(s): 5266
- Time zone: ACST (UTC+9:30)
  - Summer (DST): ACST (UTC+10:30)
- Location: 162 km (101 mi) SE of Adelaide; 81 km (50 mi) SE of Tailem Bend.
- LGA(s): Coorong District Council
- Region: Murray and Mallee
- County: Cardwell
- State electorate(s): MacKillop
- Federal division(s): Barker
| Mean max temp | Mean min temp | Annual rainfall |
| 22.9 °C; 73 °F | 8.0 °C; 46 °F | 408.1 mm 16.1 in |
Suburbs around Colebatch:
| Coroong | Field | Tintinara |
| Coroong | Colebatch | Tintinara |
| Salt Creek | Deepwater | Deepwater |
- Footnotes: adjoining localities

Colebatch is a locality in the Australian state of South Australia located in the state’s south-east about 162 kilometres (101 mi) south-east of the state capital of Adelaide and about 81 kilometres (50 mi) south-east of the municipal seat in Tailem Bend.

Its boundaries were created on 24 August 2000. Its name is derived from the cadastral unit of the Hundred of Colebatch.

The majority land use within Colebatch is ’primary production’ and is concerned with “agricultural production.” Some land in the south which is occupied by the Messent Conservation Park is zoned for ‘conservation’.

The locality includes a granite underground tank and guttering system which is listed as a state heritage place on the South Australian Heritage Register.

Colebatch is located within the federal division of Barker, the state electoral district of MacKillop and the local government area of the Coorong District Council.
