= Tintinara =

- Town
- Coordinates: 35°53′0″S 140°03′0″E
- Country: Australia
- State: South Australia
- LGA: The Coorong District Council
- Location: 190 km (120 mi) SE of Adelaide
- Established: 1850s

Government
  - State electorate: MacKillop
  - Federal division: Barker
- Elevation: 20 m (66 ft)

Population
  - Total: 277 (UCL 2021)
- Postcode: 5266
Localities around Tintinara
Field	Culburra; Coonalpyn; Geranium; Parrakie	Ngarkat
Colebatch	Tintinara	Ngarkat; Coombe
Deepwater	Bunbury	Mount Charles

Tintinara is a town in the Murray and Mallee region of the South East of South Australia.

The town is situated on the Dukes Highway and the Adelaide-Melbourne railway line. It is in The Coorong District Council local government area, the South Australian House of Assembly Electoral district of MacKillop and the Australian House of Representatives Division of Barker. At the 2016 Australian census, the town and district had a population of 527.

The origin of the name has been debated. One possibility is that a local Aboriginal man was named Tin-Tin, and the 'ara' was appended to form the place name, or that one of the Boothbys' Aboriginal employees was named Tintinara. Geoff Manning suggests that the name may have derived from an Aboriginal word, tinlinyara, the stars in Orion's belt.

== History ==
The area was first settled by Europeans in the 1840s when graziers moved their flocks of sheep into the district. Shortly afterwards the 'Tintinara' homestead was erected by the brothers T. W. Boothby and J. H. Boothby, who held a lease of 165 sq.miles here. In 1865 the new owners, William Harding and George Bunn, built a 16-stand shearing shed which is now classified by the National Trust, along with the homestead.

The Tintinara wells and Reedy Wells were regular watering points for Tolmer's gold escort team. Tintinara post office was opened in the 1860s.

Tintinara is situated in what was an unproductive region because of its poor sandy soils, and low mallee scrub and heath vegetation. After clearing of some of this vegetation, and the addition of trace elements, the district has become a productive farming area. One of the main environmental areas that Tintinara has is Lake Indawarra.

== Community organisations ==
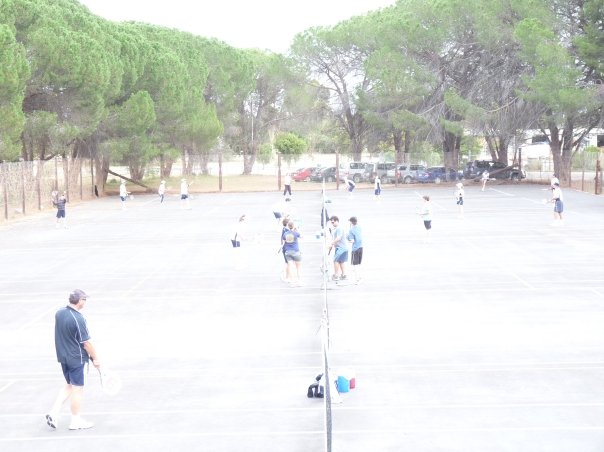
Tintinara Tennis Courts 2009 Grand Final

=== Generally ===
Tintinara has many different community organisations including the Tintinara Action Club and Tintinara Lions Club as well as many different facilities including:

- Tintinara Cricket Club
- Border Downs Tintinara Football & Netball Club
- Tintinara Bowling Club
- Tintinara Golf Club
- Tintinara Tennis Club

=== Tintinara Tennis Club ===
The Tintinara Tennis Club was established in 1919 by Edward B. Northcott and Fanny and Tilly Williams. There were approximately 40 members when the club formed. The facilities consisted of two courts that were used for many years, then in the summer of 1951–52 games started on four new courts. Since then more courts have been added and a new clubhouse was completed in 1966. Currently the club has 6 courts and a clubhouse.
