= Hundred of Colebatch =

The Hundred of Colebatch is a Hundred of the County of Cardwell (South Australia) centred on Colebatch, South Australia
