= Coorong National Park =

National park in South Australia

- IUCN category II (national park)
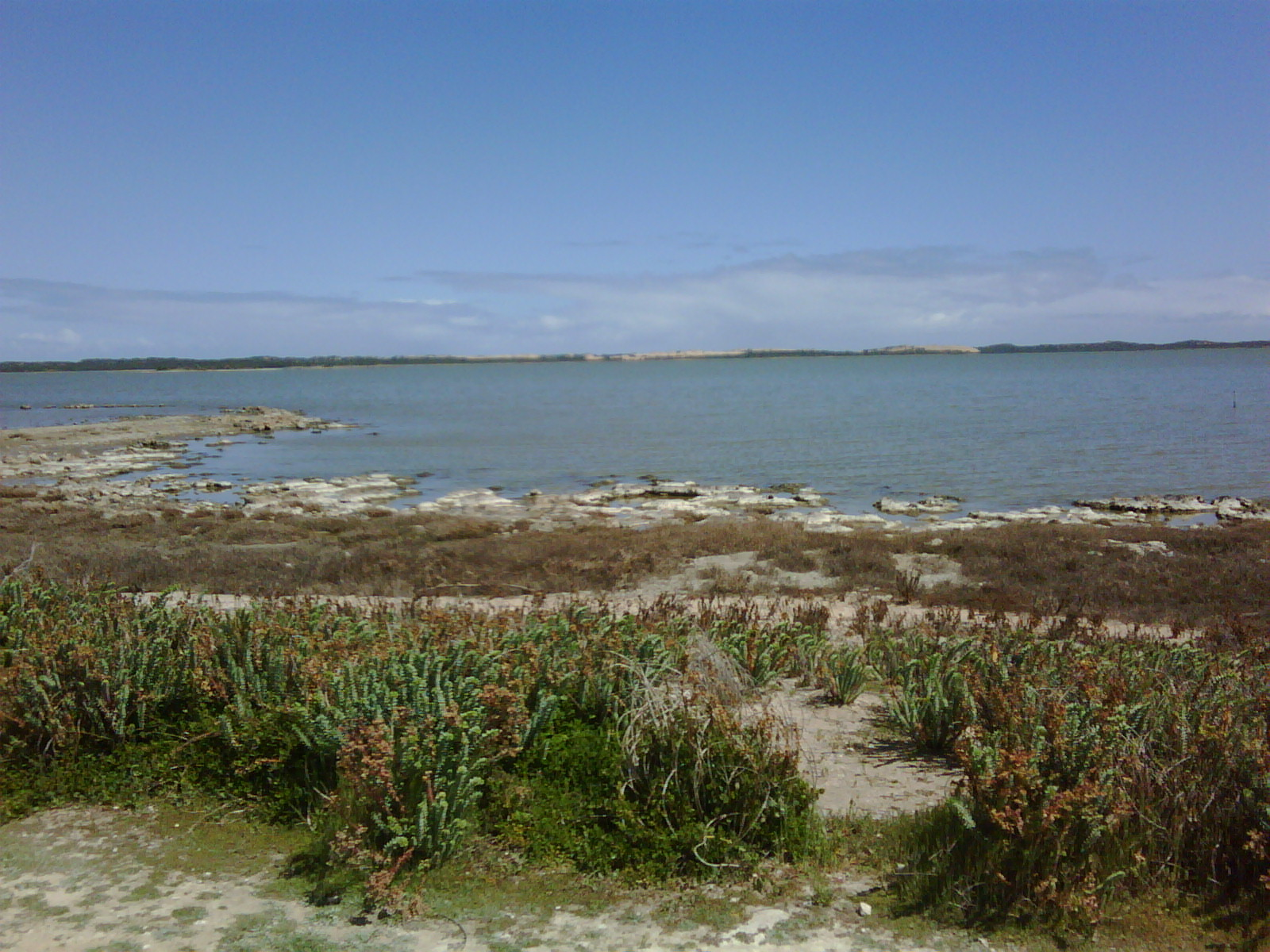
- The view across the Coorong near Salt Creek

- Location within South Australia
- Location: South Australia
- Nearest city: Goolwa
- Coordinates: 36°02′57″S 139°33′13″E
- Area: 490.15 km^{2} (189.25 sq mi)
- Established: 9 November 1967
- Governing body: Department for Environment & Water
- Website: https://www.parks.sa.gov.au/parks/coorong-national-park

Coorong National Park is a protected area located in South Australia about 156 kilometres (97 mi) south-east of Adelaide, that predominantly covers a coastal lagoon ecosystem officially known as The Coorong and the Younghusband Peninsula on the Coorong's southern side. The western end of the Coorong lagoon is at the Murray Mouth near Hindmarsh Island and the Sir Richard Peninsula, and it extends about 130 kilometres (81 mi) south-eastwards. Road access is from Meningie. The beach on the coastal side of the peninsula, the longest in Australia, is also commonly called The Coorong.

The Coorong lies within the traditional lands of the Ngarrindjeri people, an Aboriginal Australian group. Notable locations within the park include Salt Creek, Policeman's Point, Jack Point, and Woods Well.

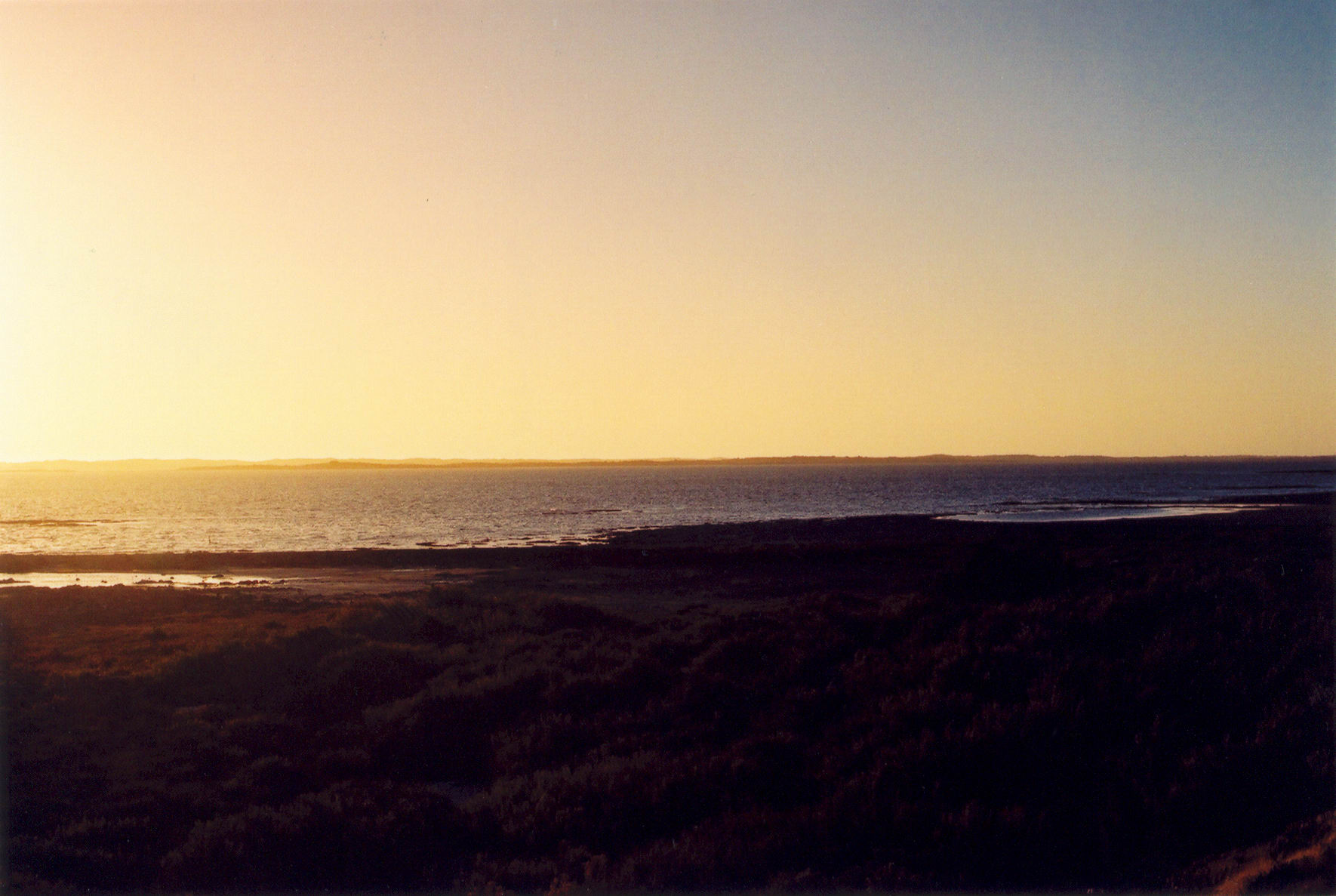
Sunset over the northern part of The Coorong, approaching the town of Meningie, South Australia.

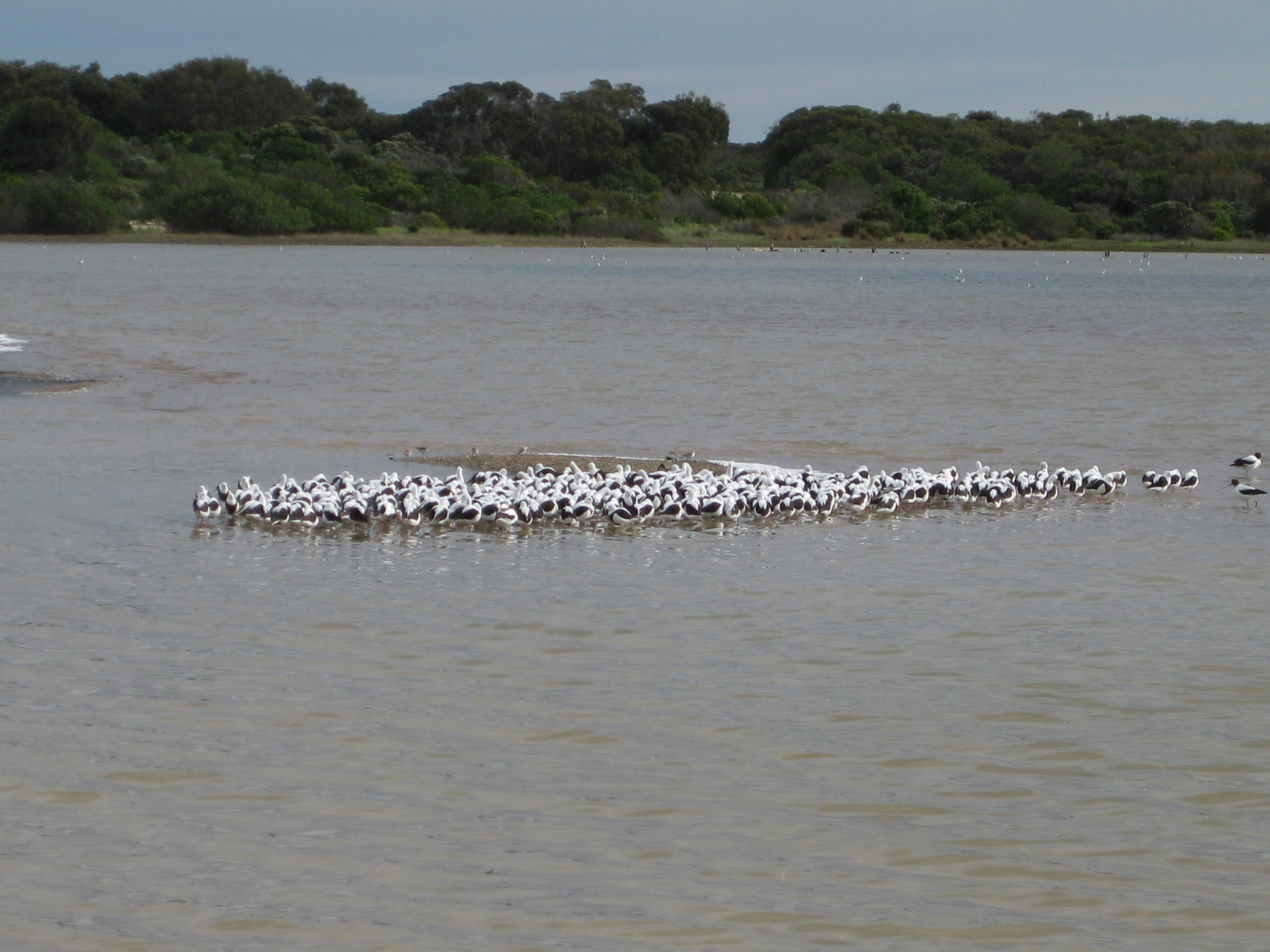
Flock of banded stilts on sand flats at the Coorong.

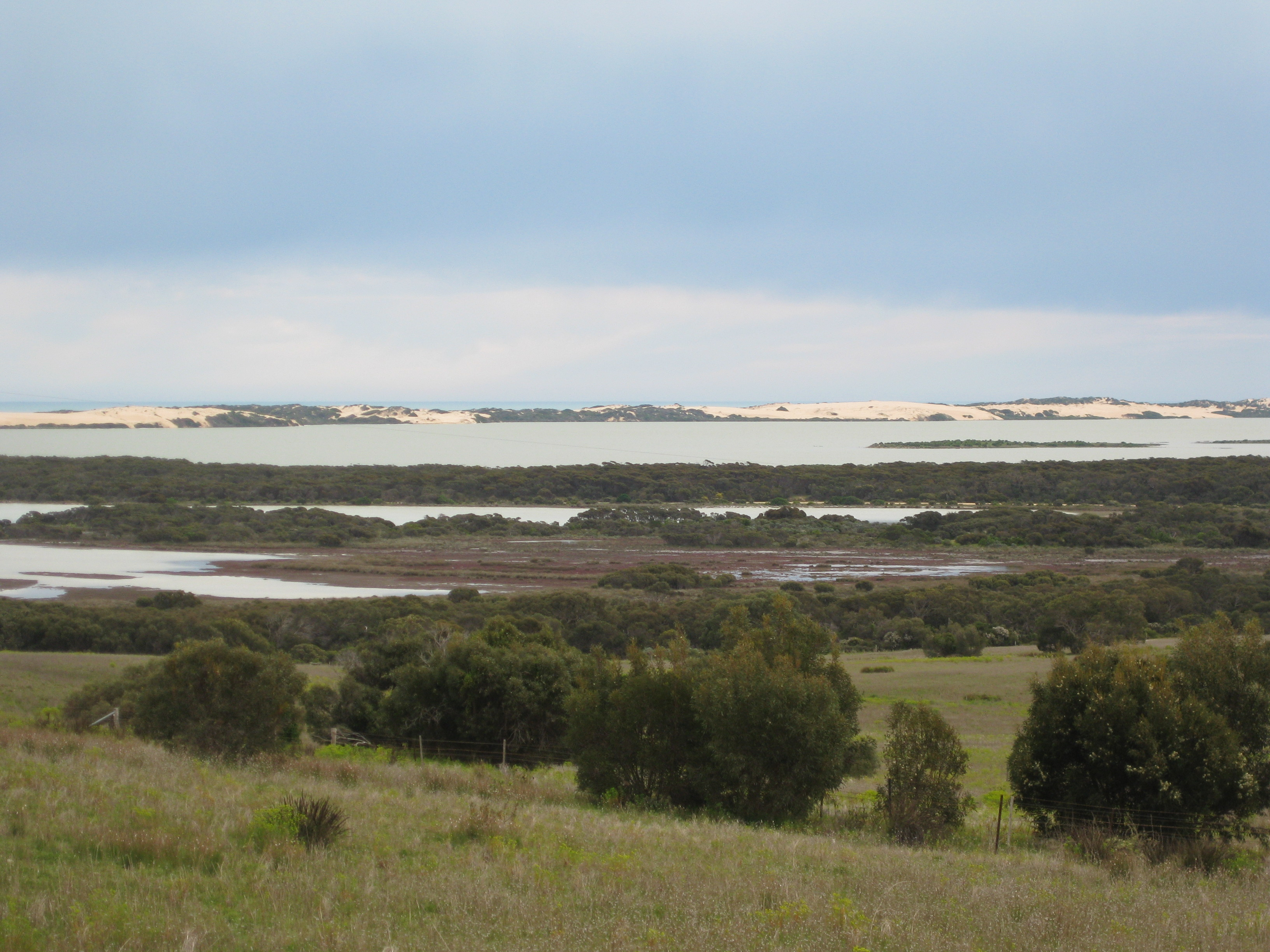
View of the Coorong and Younghusband Peninsula.

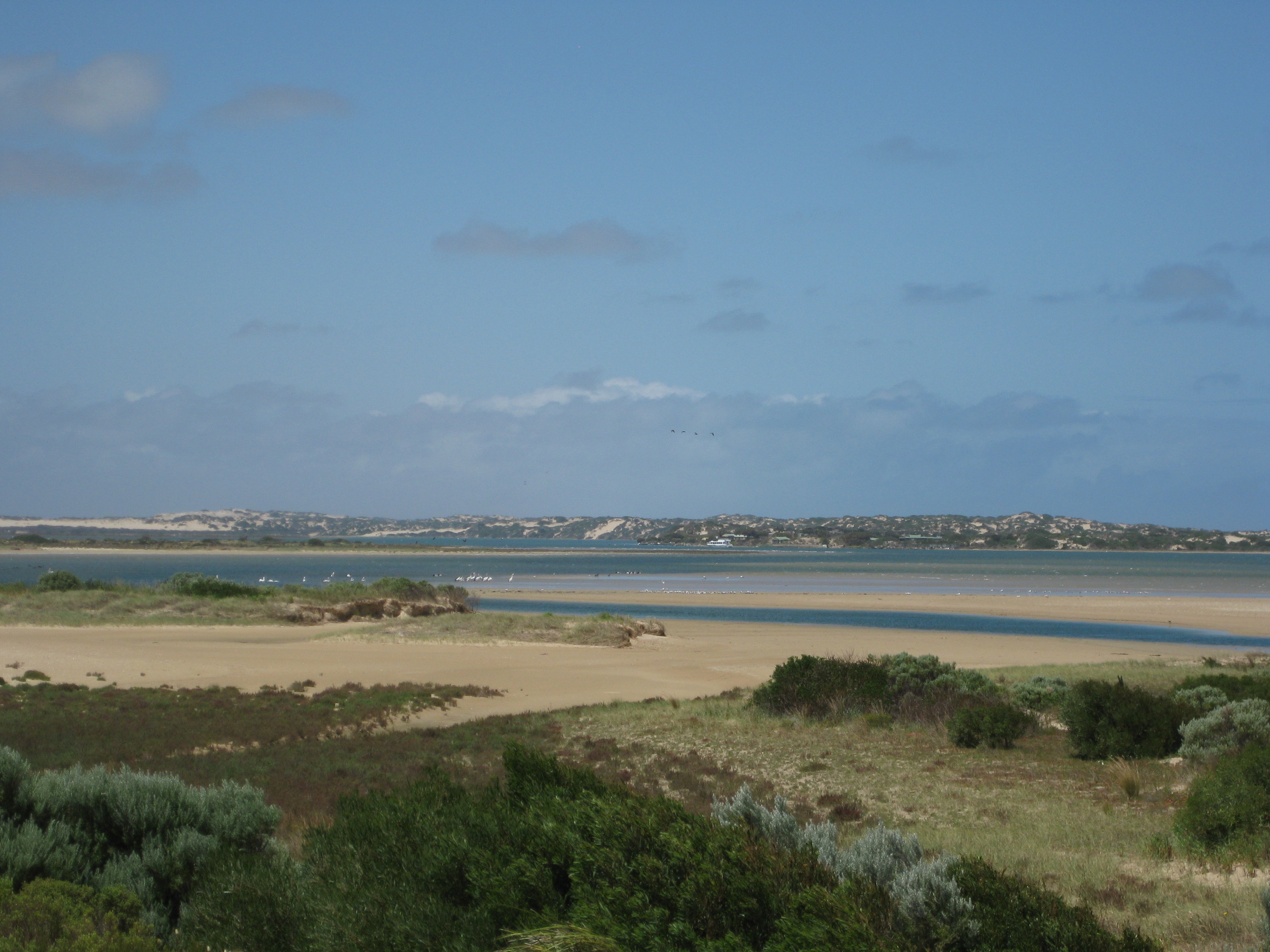
Entrance to The Coorong (mid-distance) looking from Hindmarsh Island.

== Etymology ==
Its name is thought to be a corruption of the Ngarrindjeri word kurangk, also written Kurangh, meaning a long or narrow lagoon or neck.

== History ==
The Coorong National Park was proclaimed on 9 November 1967 under the National Parks Act 1966 in respect to land in sections 17 and 60 in the cadastral unit of the Hundred of Glyde and section 6 in the Hundred of Santo.

At the commencement of the National Parks and Wildlife Act 1972 on 27 April 1972, the national park consisted of land in sections 17, 59 and 60 in the cadastral unit of the Hundred of Glyde and sections 6, 43 and 52 in the Hundred of Santo.

The Coorong Game Reserve which was purchased by the Government of South Australia in 1968 was abolished on 14 January 1993 and its lands was added to the national park. The game reserve occupied part of the Coorong lagoon to the immediate west of Salt Creek and had an area of 68.4 square kilometres (26.4 sq mi) as of May 1982.

In February 2013, a lifeboat from MS Oliva, a ship that foundered in the South Atlantic during 2011, washed up on a beach in the national park.

== Description ==
The western end of the Coorong lagoon is at the Murray Mouth near Hindmarsh Island and the Sir Richard Peninsula, and it extends about 130 kilometres (81 mi) south-east. The national park area includes the Coorong itself, and Younghusband Peninsula which separates the Coorong from Gulf St Vincent in the Southern Ocean. The Coorong has been cut off from Lake Alexandrina by the construction of the Goolwa Barrages (weirs) from Goolwa to Pelican Point during the late 1930s.

The national park was formed in 1967 as a sanctuary for many species of birds, animals and fish. It attracts many migratory species. It provides refuge for these animals during some of Australia's regular droughts. The 467 square kilometres (180 sq mi) also supports coastal dune systems, lagoons and coastal vegetation.

One of the unique aspects of the Coorong is the interaction of water along its length, with sea water and Murray River water meeting rainfall and groundwater. The freshwater supports the fauna (animal) of the area while the sea water is the habitat for much of the birdlife.

Notable locations within the park include Salt Creek, Policeman's Point, Jack Point, and Woods Well.

The waters of the Coorong are a popular venue for recreational and commercial fishers. Coorong mullet, mulloway and bream are the main species.

== Beach ==
The 194 km (121 mi) long sandy beach running down the outer side of the Younghusband Peninsula and commonly referred to as The Coorong, is the longest beach in Australia. It runs from the Murray mouth to Cape Jaffa.

== Cultural significance ==
The Coorong is of great cultural significance to the Ngarrindjeri people, who have songlines relating to creation stories associated with the area as well as a long history of living sustainably and looking after the complex environment.

=== Camp Coorong ===
Camp Coorong is a place of cultural learning, where visitors can learn about Ngarrindjeri culture, history, arts and crafts, including basket-weaving. It is owned and run by Ngarrindjeri people, and situated about 11 km (6.8 mi) south of Meningie. The centre was founded by brothers Tom and George Trevorrow in 1985, with the aim of creating a place where the local community could have camps, younger members of the community might find employment, and Ngarrindjeri culture could be shared. It was officially closed to the public in 2018.

Ngarrindjeri elder and well-known weaver Aunty Ellen Trevorrow, who is Tom's widow, works from one of the rooms at the camp, along with artist and academic Jelina Haines, who was born in the Philippines. Their work has been commissioned for the recently refurbished Department for Infrastructure & Transport offices in Pirie Street.

== Ecology ==
The wetlands within the part of the national park containing the Coorong Lagoon form a complex ecosystem of freshwater, estuarine, and hypersaline waterbodies with a unique diversity of habitats for plants and animals. The coastal lagoons are considered critically endangered due to the loss of freshwater flows, local extinction of characteristic submerged plants and subsequent loss of habitat diversity.

In December 2018, the Federal and South Australian governments announced a new environmental management program called "Healthy Coorong, Healthy Basin". Ongoing as of 2021, the Ngarrindjeri Aboriginal Corporation is working with the Department for Environment & Water to share their knowledge of landcare practices, which will be incorporated in a new database.

== Flora and fauna ==
The Coorong is an area of huge natural biodiversity.

=== Birds ===
The Coorong National Park has been recognised by BirdLife International as an Important Bird Area. It has supported the chestnut teal, Australian shelduck, sharp-tailed sandpiper, red-necked stint, banded stilt, red-necked avocet, pied oystercatcher and red-capped plover. Australasian bitterns have been recorded. It has also supported significant numbers of orange-bellied parrots, fairy terns and hooded plovers, although their usage of the site has declined from reduced freshwater inflows.

The largest pelican rookery in Australia is at Jack Point, just off the Princes Highway and about 7 km (4.3 mi) north of Salt Creek. The pelicans also breed on North Pelican Island. The Australian pelican (Pelecanus conspicillatus) is the largest species of pelican, and breeds from August until January.

=== Marine life ===
As mentioned above, Coorong mullet, mulloway and bream are the main species caught for human consumption in the Coorong.

== In the arts ==
The park was the setting of the popular 1976 film Storm Boy, as well as its 2019 remake. Both films are based on the 1964 novel by Colin Thiele of the same name set on the Coorong that portrays the bond of a young boy who rescues and raises an extraordinary orphaned pelican which he names Mr Percival.

Lucy Treloar's award-winning novel, Salt Creek (2015), is set in the Coorong, specifically the area around Salt Creek, in 1855.

== See also ==
- Coorong, Lower Lakes and Murray Mouth (CLLMM) Research Centre, a research centre situated in Goolwa
- Coorongite, an elastic substance found at Salt Creek in 1865; origin debated
- List of islands within the Murray River in South Australia
- Protected areas of South Australia
