= Desert Camp Conservation Reserve =

Protected area in South Australia

- IUCN category VI (protected area with sustainable use of natural resources)
- Location within South Australia
- Location: South Australia, Marcollat
- Nearest city: Keith.
- Coordinates: 36°28′33″S 140°22′51″E
- Area: 8.82 km^{2} (3.41 sq mi)
- Established: 11 November 1993
- Visitors: ‘rarely used’ (in 1997)
- Governing body: Department of Environment, Water and Natural Resources

Desert Camp Conservation Reserve is a protected area in the Australian state of South Australia located in the state's Limestone Coast in the gazetted locality of Marcollat about 44 kilometres (27 mi) south of the town centre in Keith. It is classified as an IUCN Category VI protected area.

The reserve occupies crown land in section 55 of the cadastral unit of the Hundred of Marcollat on the eastern side of the Riddoch Highway which runs from Keith in the north to Naracoorte in the south. It is also bounded to the north by Rowney Road which runs from Bordertown in the north-east to Kingston SE in the south-west and which stops at the Riddoch Highway and resumes about a 1 kilometre (0.62 mi) to the south.

== Background ==
The crown land was dedicated as a conservation reserve on 11 November 1993 and placed "under the care, control and management of the Minister of Environment and Natural Resources". Its name is derived from the Desert Camp Conservation Park which is located to the immediate west on the western side of Rowney Road.

The area was reported in 1997 as being “the largest block of remnant vegetation in the Hundred of Marcollat” and which “accounts for over half of the remaining native vegetation in blocks greater than 25 hectares in that Hundred”. It was also reported that the following eight distinct vegetation associations have been identified within the conservation reserve with at least 248 recorded species of native plants including 17 listed as “rare or threatened in the south east”, 10 listed as “either threatened or rare in South Australia” and the metallic sun-orchid (Thelymitra epipactoides) which was “considered endangered nationally”.

1. Brown stringybark (Eucalyptus baxteri) low woodland
2. Pink gum (Eucalyptus fasciculosa) woodland over a mixed heath
3. Pink gum (Eucalyptus fasciculosa) low woodland over a desert banksia (Banksia ornata)/heath yacca (Xanthorrhoea caespitose)/heath tea-tree (Leptospermum myrsinoides) open heath
4. South Australian blue gum (Eucalyptus leucoxylon) woodland
5. Dwarf hakea (Hakea rugosa)/dwarf sheok (Allocasuarina pusilla)/honey myrtle (Melaleuca brevifolia) heath
6. Coastal white mallee (Eucalyptus diversifolia) open scrub
7. Broombush (Melaleuca uncinata)/silver broombush (Baeckea behrii) open heath
8. Mixed herbland

Fauna observed in the conservation reserve as of 1997 include “sixteen bird species of high conservation significance” including the black-chinned honeyeater which was reported as being “rare” and the following two species which were reported as being “vulnerable in South Australia” - the eastern yellow robin and the malleefowl. The conservation reserve was reported in 1997 as being “rarely used by park visitors” and that “most common visitors are field naturalists and bird watchers”.

== See also ==
- Protected areas of South Australia
- Conservation reserves of South Australia
