= Talapar Conservation Park =

Protected area in South Australia

- IUCN category III (natural monument or feature)
- Location within South Australia
- Location: South Australia, Keppoch
- Nearest city: Padthaway
- Coordinates: 36°42′53″S 140°28′00″E
- Area: 4.82 km^{2} (1.86 sq mi)
- Established: 2 June 1977
- Visitors: ‘little visitor use’ (in 1992)
- Governing body: Department for Environment and Water

Talapar Conservation Park is a protected area in the Australian state of South Australia located in the state's Limestone Coast in the gazetted locality of Keppoch about 40 kilometres (25 mi) north-west of the town centre in Naracoorte.

The conservation park occupies land in sections 373, 374 and 402 of the cadastral unit of the Hundred of Glen Roy. It was proclaimed under the National Parks and Wildlife Act 1972 on 2 June 1977. As of July 2016, the conservation park covered an area of 4.82 square kilometres (1.86 sq mi).

In 1992, the conservation park was described as follows. Firstly, the extent of “small interconnected ephemeral wetlands” had been “severely reduced” due to the effectiveness of regional land drainage and these areas may be restored by “minor earthworks on the northern side” of the conservation park. Secondly, soils with the conservation park are reported as being located in the “Bool Lagoon Environmental Association”, and consisting of “alkaline, shallow, weakly structured sandy soils” in the “better-drained areas” and “moderately deep, black, self-mulching, cracking clays” in the “poorly drained areas”. Thirdly, the conservation park was reported as containing the following six vegetation associations in 1992:

1. a woodland of South Australian blue gum,
2. a “low open forest-low woodland” of brown stringybark,
3. a “closed heath-open heath” consisting of Melaleuca neglecta, broombush and Leptospermum juniperinum,
4. a “low woodland-low open woodland” of either pink gum with a heath understorey or pink gum and South Australian blue gum over an understorey of broombush, and
5. an “open scrub-low open forest’’ of South Australian swamp paperbark in association with a “closed sedgeland” of Machaerina Juncea, Chorizandra enodis, Lepidosperma laterale and Leptocarpus brownii.

As of 1992, the conservation park had "little visitor use", so no visitor facilities were provided, with the exception of vehicle access tracks with a width of 5 metres (16 ft) around its perimeter to allow access when periodic flooding occurs.

The conservation park is classified as an IUCN Category III protected area.

== See also ==
- Protected areas of South Australia
