= Jip Jip Conservation Park =

Protected area in South Australia

- IUCN category III (natural monument or feature)
- Location within South Australia
- Location: South Australia
- Nearest city: Kingston SE
- Coordinates: 36°29′00″S 140°11′07″E
- Area: 1.4 km^{2} (0.54 sq mi)
- Established: 10 August 1967
- Visitors: “popular picnic spot” (in 1980)
- Governing body: Department for Environment and Water

Jip Jip Conservation Park (formerly the Jip Jip National Park) is a protected area in the Australian state of South Australia located in the state’s south-east in the gazetted locality of Marcollat about 223 kilometres (139 mi) south-east of the state capital of Adelaide and about 50 kilometres (31 mi) north-east of the municipal seat of Kingston SE.

The conservation park consists of land in section 86 in the cadastral unit of the Hundred of Peacock which is located on the northern side of Ballater Road, also known as the Kingston - Keith road. On 20 March 1967, it was proclaimed under the National Parks Act 1966 as Jip Jip National Park. On 27 April 1972, it was reconstituted as Jip Jip Conservation Park upon the proclamation of the National Parks and Wildlife Act 1972. The land includes Jip Jip Rocks, a local landmark consisting of granite outcrops and a “gently sloping hill”. It is reported that the dedication of the national park followed a “protracted dispute and considerable public interest in protecting the granite outcrops”. As of 2018, it covered an area of 1.4 square kilometres (0.54 sq mi).

In 1980, it was described as follows:

Jip Jip is best known for its granitic outcrops which are part of the Padthaway Rise. However, the park also contains Asplenium flabellifolium which is an endangered fern and six other plant species which are rare in South Australia… Over sixty species of birds have been recorded and one of the mammals recorded, Cercartetus lepidus (little pigmy possum), is uncommon in SA… Jip Jip Conservation Park features granitic inselbergs surrounded by sandy swales and ridges. The dominant plant community on the sandy areas is Eucalyptus baxteri/E. fasciculosa low open forest with heath understorey. Smaller areas of E. fasciculosa/E. baxteri/E. diversifolia (open scrub) and Melaleuca gibbosa/Hakea rugosa (open heath) occupy the depressions. Around the granitic outcrops Casuarina stricta is a prominent tree with the eucalypts and tall shrubs of Bursaria spinosa, Dodonaea viscosa, Melaleuca uncinata and Prostanthera behriana are common. The park is relatively unmodified although it is a popular picnic spot.

As of 1992, visitors to the conservation park was “local residents for picnics, walking and viewing the granite outcrops, as well as by bird observers and field naturalists”.

The conservation park is classified as an IUCN Category III protected area. In 1980, it was listed on the now-defunct Register of the National Estate.

== See also ==
- Protected areas of South Australia
