= Hundred of Duffield =

Hundred of Duffield South Australia
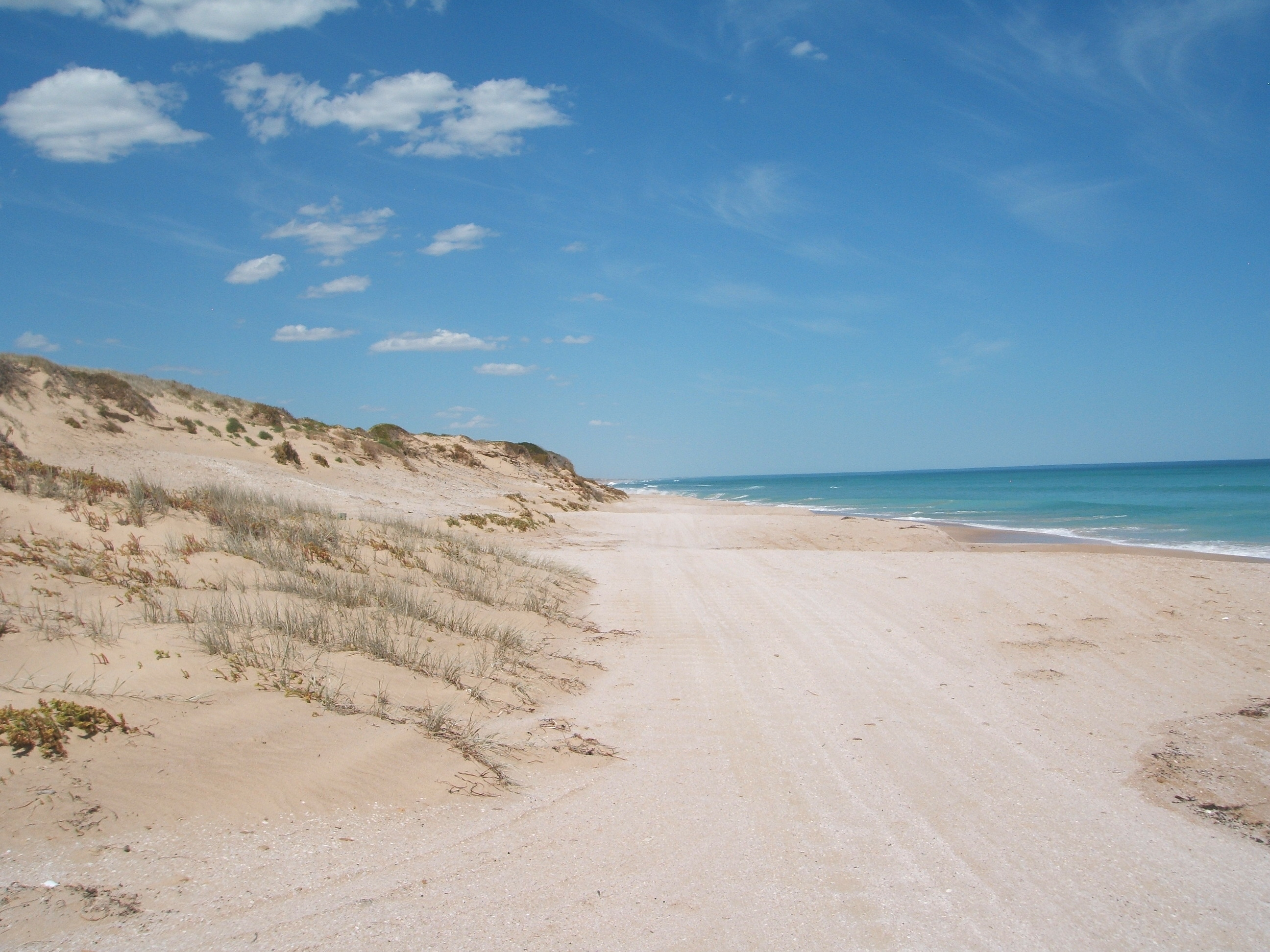

- Coordinates: 36°34′11″S 139°53′29″E
- LGA(s): Kingston District Council
- Region: Limestone Coast
- County: MacDonnell
Lands administrative divisions around Hundred of Duffield:
Ocean	Neville; Wells	Wells
Ocean	Hundred of Duffield	Landseer
Ocean	Lacepede	Lacepede
- Footnotes: Coordinates; Adjoining Hundreds

The Hundred of Duffield is a cadastral unit of hundred located in the Australian state of South Australia within the County of MacDonnell and the state government region of the Limestone Coast about 210 kilometres (130 mi) south-east of the state capital of Adelaide and about 29 kilometres (18 mi) north of the municipal seat of Kingston SE.

It is located on the Australian continental coastline overlooking the body of water known in Australia as the Southern Ocean and by international authorities as the Great Australian Bight. Its extent includes part of the locality of Coorong on its western side while its eastern side is occupied by the locality of Taratap.

== History ==
The traditional owners of the land are the Ngarrindjeri. The hundred was proclaimed on 3 November 1864, but it wasn't until 1888 that local government administration was brought to the hundred when it was annexed by the District Council of Lacapede, later called Kingston council. A school opened in the area in 1912 but closed in 1916.
