= County of MacDonnell =

MacDonnell South Australia
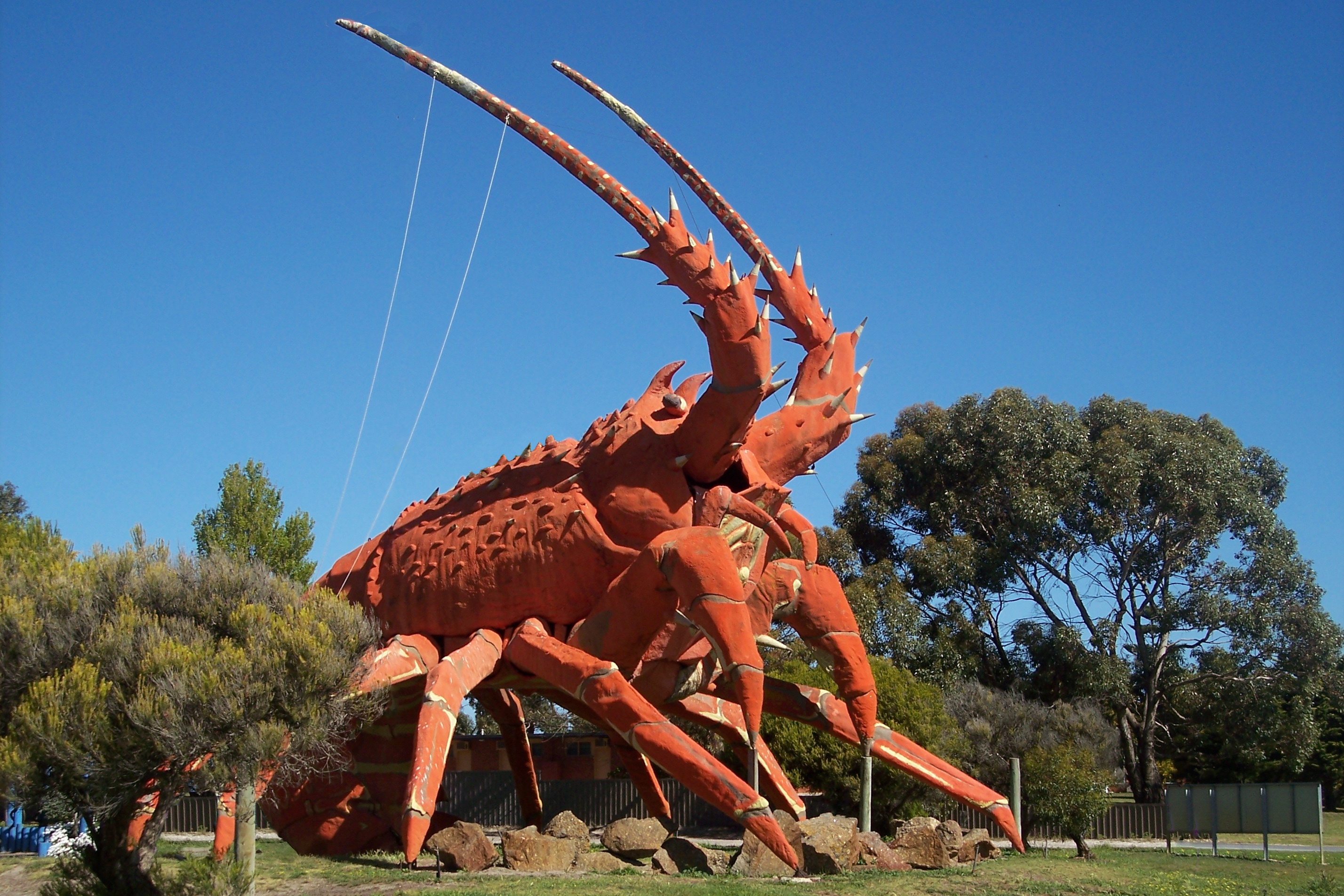
- Lobster sculpture at Kingston in the Hundred of Lacepede

- Coordinates: 36.65°S 140.41°E
- Established: 1857
- Area: 4,784 km^{2} (1,847.1 sq mi)
- LGA(s): Kingston District Council; Tatiara District Council; Naracoorte Lucindale Council
- Region: Limestone Coast
Lands administrative divisions around MacDonnell:
Ocean	Cardwell; Buckingham	Lowan (Vic)
Ocean	MacDonnell	Lowan (Vic); Follett (Vic)
Ocean	Robe	Follett (Vic)
- Footnotes: Coordinates; Adjoining counties

The County of MacDonnell is one of the 49 cadastral counties of South Australia. It was proclaimed in 1857 and named for the South Australian Governor at the time of proclamation, Richard Graves MacDonnell. It is located in the upper south-east of the state from the Limestone Coast at Kingston to the Victorian border. This includes the following contemporary local government areas of the state:

- Kingston District Council (excluding coastal portions at north and south)
- Naracoorte Lucindale Council (north third)
- Tatiara District Council (small south portion)

== Hundreds ==
The County of MacDonnell is divided into the following 15 hundreds:

- Hundred of Duffield (Coorong, Taratap)
- Hundred of Landseer (Taratap)
- Hundred of Peacock (Keilira)
- Hundred of Marcollat (Marcollat)
- Hundred of Parsons (Padthaway)
- Hundred of Beeamma (Western Flat)
- Hundred of Geegeela (Bangham)
- Hundred of Glen Roy (Padthaway, Keppoch)
- Hundred of Lacepede (West Range, Kingston)
- Hundred of Murrabinna (Blackford)
- Hundred of Minecrow (Keilira)
- Hundred of Woolumbool (Woolumbool)
- Hundred of Lochaber (Lochaber)
- Hundred of Hynam (Cadgee)
- Hundred of Binnum (Binnum, Kybybolite)
