= Mount Scott Conservation Park =

Protected area in South Australia

- IUCN category Ia (strict nature reserve)
- Location within South Australia
- Location: South Australia
- Nearest city: Kingston SE
- Coordinates: 36°48′58″S 140°04′08″E
- Area: 12.67 km^{2} (4.89 sq mi)
- Established: 9 November 1972
- Visitors: 'low' (in 1994)
- Governing body: Department for Environment and Water

Mount Scott Conservation Park is a protected area in the Australian state of South Australia located in the gazetted locality of Blackford about 23 kilometres (14 mi) east of Kingston SE in the state's Limestone Coast region.

The conservation park is located on the remnants of a coastal dune system which run parallel to the current continental coastline from the north-west to the south-east and which have a maximum height of not greater than 30 metres (98 ft). The course of the now non-existent stream, Reedy Creek, adjoins the south western boundary of the Park while the West Avenue Range adjoins its eastern side. The slopes of the remnant dunes consist of soils of “deep sandy loams with outcrops of limestone on the ridge tops” while the low-lying areas have “clayey loam soils" that are "subject to inundation and become waterlogged during wet periods". The conservation park is accessed via its north-west corner from Mount Scott Road. A track of 5 metres (16 ft) width has been provided to its boundary for the purpose of “management access”. Its name is derived from a nearby hill known as Mount Scott.

The conservation park was constituted under the National Parks and Wildlife Act 1972 on 9 November 1972 in respect to land in section 71 in the cadastral unit of the Hundred of Murrabinna. As of 2012, access to the conservation park for the purpose of petroleum exploration under the Petroleum and Geothermal Energy Act 2000 was not permitted.

As of 1994, the conservation park was reported as supporting a “variety of vegetation types” and some “notable species” of fauna:

1. The south western side consists of flats “dominated” by river red gums while the centre of the conservation park where a central limestone ridge exists supported a woodland of South Australian blue gum and pink gum.
2. The eastern side where the soil was “more sandy”, was dominated by mallee vegetation while stands of South Australian swamp paper-bark and "mallee honey-myrtle (M. neglecta)" were found in the calcareous soils in low-lying areas.
3. Fauna species observed include common wombat, malleefowl, red-necked wallaby, silky mouse and western grey kangaroo.

As of 1994, visitor use as reported as being “low” and consisted of “walkers, campers or field naturalists”. Facilities for visitors in 1994 consisted of “a picnic and camping area” located in the north east corner of the conservation park near its entry point.

The conservation park is classified as an IUCN Category Ia protected area.
