= Cadgee, South Australia =

Cadgee South Australia
- Coordinates: 36.791860°S 140.709950°E
- Population: 53 (SAL 2021)
- Established: 12 April 2001
- Postcode(s): 5271
- Time zone: ACST (UTC+9:30)
  - Summer (DST): ACST (UTC+10:30)
- Location: 280 km (174 mi) south-east of Adelaide; 18 km (11 mi) north-west of Naracoorte; 116 km (72 mi) north of Mount Gambier
- LGA(s): Naracoorte Lucindale Council
- Region: Limestone Coast
- County: MacDonnell
- State electorate(s): MacKillop
- Federal division(s): Barker
Mean max temp	Mean min temp	Annual rainfall
21.6 °C; 71 °F	8.1 °C; 47 °F	484 mm 19.1 in
Suburbs around Cadgee:
Keppoch	The Gap	Binnum
Lochaber	Cadgee	Binnum; Wild Dog Valley
Lochaber	Wild Dog Valley	Wild Dog Valley
- Footnotes: Coordinates; Locations; Climatic data Adjoining Localities

Cadgee is a locality in the Australian state of South Australia located in the state's south-east within the Limestone Coast region about 280 kilometres (170 miles) south east of the state capital of Adelaide and about 18 kilometres (11 miles) north of the municipal seat of Naracoorte.

Boundaries were created in April 2001 for the “long established name.”

The majority land use within the locality is primary production. A parcel of land at the locality’s western end was proclaimed in 1972 as a protected area known as the Grass Tree Conservation Park.

Cadgee is located within the federal division of Barker, the state electoral district of MacKillop and the local government area of the Naracoorte Lucindale Council.
