= Keppoch, South Australia =

Keppoch South Australia
- Coordinates: 36°42′56″S 140°35′40″E
- Population: 65 (SAL 2021)
- Established: 1870 (town); 12 April 2001 (locality)
- Postcode(s): 5271
- Time zone: ACST (UTC+9:30)
  - Summer (DST): ACST (UTC+10:30)
- Location: 269 km (167 mi) SE of Adelaide; 29 km (18 mi) NW of Naracoorte; 122 km (76 mi) N of Mount Gambier
- LGA(s): Naracoorte Lucindale Council
- Region: Limestone Coast
- County: MacDonnell
- State electorate(s): MacKillop
- Federal division(s): Barker
Mean max temp	Mean min temp	Annual rainfall
21.5 °C; 71 °F	8.6 °C; 47 °F	453.8 mm 17.9 in
Suburbs around Keppoch:
Woolumbool	Padthaway; The Gap	The Gap
Woolumbool	Keppoch	The Gap
Woolumbool	Lochaber	Cadgee
- Footnotes: Adjoining Localities

Keppoch (formerly Cockatoo Lake and Keppach) is a locality in the Australian state of South Australia located in the state's south-east within the Limestone Coast region about 269 kilometres (167 miles) south east of the state capital of Adelaide and about 29 kilometres (18 miles) north-east of the municipal seat of Naracoorte.

Keppoch started as a town surveyed in 1870 with a proposed name of Cockatoo Lake, but it was given the name of ‘Keppoch’ “after a village in Argyll, Scotland” by Governor Fergusson. However, this name was misspelt as 'Keppach'. It was officially renamed in 1938 under the Crown Lands Act 1929 via proclamation as the “Town of Keppoch” on the basis that “the name, which is of Scottish origin, was incorrectly spelt.” A school opened with the name "Keppach" which was changed to "Keppoch" in 1942 and which was closed in 1951. Boundaries were created in April 2001 for the locality which include the extent of the government town of Keppoch.

The majority land use within the locality is primary production. A parcel of land at the locality's western end was proclaimed in 1977 as a protected area known as the Talapar Conservation Park.

Keppoch is located within the federal division of Barker, the state electoral district of MacKillop and the local government area of the Naracoorte Lucindale Council.
