= Wangolina, South Australia =

Wangolina South Australia
- Coordinates: 36.942°S 139.818°E
- Population: 64 (2016 census)
- Established: 3 December 1998
- Postcode(s): 5275
- Time zone: ACST (UTC+9:30)
  - Summer (DST): ACST (UTC+10:30)
- Location: 252 km (157 mi) south-east of Adelaide city centre; 144 km (89 mi) north-west of Mount Gambier; 17 km (11 mi) south of Kingston SE
- LGA(s): Kingston District Council
- State electorate(s): MacKillop
- Federal division(s): Barker
Mean max temp	Mean min temp	Annual rainfall
19.3 °C; 67 °F	10.3 °C; 51 °F	489.4 mm 19.3 in
Suburbs around Wangolina:
Lacepede Bay	Sandy Grove; Kingston SE	Kingston SE
Lacepede Bay; Cape Jaffa; Ocean	Wangolina	Reedy Creek
Ocean	Mount Benson	Mount Benson
- Footnotes: Coordinates; Locations; Climatic data Adjoining Localities

Wangolina is a locality in the Australian state of South Australia located on the state’s south-east coast overlooking the body of water known in Australia as the Southern Ocean and by international authorities as the Great Australian Bight. It is about 252 kilometres (157 miles) south-east of the Adelaide city centre and 144 kilometres (89 miles) south of the centre of Mount Gambier.

Boundaries were created in December 1998 for the “long established name” which is derived from Wangolina Station, once an outstation of the nearby Woolmit station but later a property in its own right. The Wangolina drain joins the Butchers Gap Drain which is part of the drainage infrastructure built in the south east of the state since European settlement. Wangolina consists of land along the coastline associated with the Cape Jaffa promontory which its shares with the gazetted locality of Cape Jaffa. Wangolina has coastline frontage to both Lacepede Bay in the north and to the ocean in the south. The Southern Ports Highway passes through the locality from Kingston SE in the north to Robe in the south.

The majority land use within the locality is agriculture with a strip of land adjoining the coastline being zoned for conservation.

Wangolina is located within the federal division of Barker, the state electoral district of MacKillop and the local government area of the Kingston District Council.

== History ==
The traditional owners of the hundred are the Ngarrindjerri peoples.

The first Europeans to the area were Peron in 1903 and Freycinet of the Baudin expedition to Australia 1800 to 1803..
