= Hundred of Parsons =

Hundred of Parsons may refer to:

- Hundred of Parsons (South Australia)
- Hundred of Parsons (Northern Territory)
