= Coastal Leader =

Newspaper published in Kingston, South Australia

- Type: Weekly newspaper
- Owner(s): Australian Community Media
- Founded: 1962
- Language: English
- City: Kingston, South Australia
- Website: coastalleader.com.au

Coastal Leader is a weekly newspaper published in Kingston, South Australia, founded in 1962 and published under this title since 2001. It was later sold to Rural Press, previously owned by Fairfax Media, but now an Australian media company trading as Australian Community Media.

== History ==
The Coastal Leader website claims that the newspaper's origins can be traced back to the Kingston Weekly, the newspaper of The Kingston Traders' Association. The Kingston Weekly was first issued on 22 March 1946, with the aim was to "record faithfully the growing needs of the district in business as well as pleasure". The newspaper quickly ran into difficulties, and by early 1947 they were unable to continue, due to a "lack of support and continually rising costs", such that the newspaper was taken over by a group of local businessmen. It then ran until 30 March 1951 (issue No. 258).

A decade later, another newspaper called South-East Kingston Leader was started in Kingston. This publication proved to be more successful, continuing from 1962 until 21 November 2001 (Vol. 40, no. 46), when it was renamed to its current title, Coastal Leader. Alongside many other rural publications in Australia, the newspaper was a member of Fairfax Media Limited.

== Distribution ==
The Coastal Leader circulates throughout Kingston, Robe and Coorong districts. It has a potential readership of 2,700 per week, based on a run of 1,500 copies (20 full-colour pages) printed each Wednesday morning at Murray Bridge. Of these 1,350 are sold through outlets in Kingston, Robe, Lucindale, Naracoorte, Mount Gambier, and Adelaide with the remainder as subscriptions.

== Preservation ==
The State Library of South Australia carries microfiche versions of the newspaper.
