= Paranki Lagoon Conservation Park =

Protected area in South Australia

- IUCN category VI (protected area with sustainable use of natural resources)
- Location within South Australia
- Location: South Australia, West Range
- Nearest city: Kingston SE
- Coordinates: 36°42′28.8″S 139°53′4″E
- Area: 5.30 km^{2} (2.05 sq mi)
- Established: 16 October 2014
- Governing body: Department for Environment and Water

Paranki Lagoon Conservation Park is a protected area in the Australian state of South Australia located in the state's south-east in the gazetted locality of West Range about 14 kilometres (8.7 miles) north of the town of Kingston SE. The conservation park was proclaimed under the National Parks and Wildlife Act 1972 on 16 October 2014 in respect to an area of land that:

… was a significant feeding ground for waterbirds and waders in the South East. Because it is fed by groundwater, the lake tends to fill earlier in winter and holds water longer in summer than most other lakes in the area. In the past, it has hosted up to 30,000 banded stilt, which are listed as vulnerable under the National Parks and Wildlife Act, and 40,000 waterfowl. Regular seasonal bird counts have also found it is an important feeding ground for a number of migratory species that use the East Asian-Australasian Flyway. These are birds like the sharp-tailed sandpiper, curlew sandpiper and red-necked stint, which are the subject of a number of international protection agreements.

The conservation park is classified as an IUCN Category VI protected area.
