= Woolumbool, South Australia =

Woolumbool
- Suburb
- Coordinates: 36°50′7″S 140°18′52″E
- Country: Australia
- State: South Australia
- Region: Limestone Coast
- LGA: Naracoorte Lucindale Council
- Location: 260 km (160 mi) SE of Adelaide; 39 km (24 mi) W of Naracoorte
- Established: 3 December 1998

Government
  - State electorate: MacKillop
  - Federal division: Barker

Population
  - Total: 75 (SAL 2021)
- Time zone: UTC+9:30 (ACST)
  - Summer (DST): UTC+10:30 (ACST)
- Postcode: 5272
- County: MacDonnell
- Mean max temp: 21.2 °C (70.2 °F)
- Mean min temp: 8.4 °C (47.1 °F)
- Annual rainfall: 603.5 mm (23.76 in)
Suburbs around Woolumbool
Keilira	Keilira; Marcollat	Padthaway
Keilira; Avenue Range	Woolumbool	Padthaway; Keppoch; Lochaber
Avenue Range	Lucindale	Lochaber

Woolumbool is a locality in the Australian state of South Australia located about 260 kilometres (160 mi) south-east of the state capital of Adelaide and about 39 kilometres (24 mi) west of the municipal seat in Naracoorte.

Woolumbool's boundaries were created on 3 December 1998 for the “local established name” which is derived from the cadastral unit of the Hundred of Woolumbool. The locality's boundaries align with those of the Hundred with exception to its southern boundary where the following roads form the boundary - Old Coach Road and Fairview Road.

Woolumbool is located within the federal division of Barker, the state electoral district of MacKillop and the local government area of the Naracoorte Lucindale Council.
