= West Range, South Australia =

West Range South Australia
- Coordinates: 36.73°S 139.91°E
- Population: 18 (2016 census)
- Established: 3 December 1998
- Postcode(s): 5275
- Time zone: ACST (UTC+9:30)
  - Summer (DST): ACST (UTC+10:30)
- Location: 232 km (144 mi) south-east of Adelaide city centre; 145 km (90 mi) north-west of Mount Gambier; 11 km (7 mi) south of Kingston SE
- LGA(s): Kingston District Council
- Region: Limestone Coast
- County: MacDonnell
- State electorate(s): MacKillop
- Federal division(s): Barker
Mean max temp	Mean min temp	Annual rainfall
19.3 °C; 67 °F	10.3 °C; 51 °F	489.4 mm 19.3 in
Suburbs around West Range:
Lacepede Bay	Coorong; Taratap	Taratap
Lacepede Bay	West Range	Blackford
Lacepede Bay	Kingston SE	Blackford
- Footnotes: Coordinates; Locations; Climatic data Adjoining Localities

West Range is a locality in the Australian state of South Australia located on the state's south-east coast overlooking Lacepede Bay which is part of the body of water known in Australia as the Southern Ocean and by international authorities as the Great Australian Bight. It is about 232 kilometres (144 miles) south-east of the Adelaide city centre and 145 kilometres (90 miles) south of the centre of Mount Gambier.

Boundaries were created in December 1998 for the “long established name” which was ‘identified’ by the District Council of Lacepede.

West Range consists of land along the continental coastline extending from the northern end of Paranki Lagoon in the north to the Blackford Drain in the south and from the coast to the West Range Road in the east. The Princes Highway passes through the locality from north to south between the coastline and the west side of an area of land subject to inundation and including the following water bodies (from north to south) - Paranki Lagoon, Partiari and Teilaka.

The majority land use within the locality is agriculture with a strip of land between the coastline and the Princes Highway and the full extent of the protected area associated with the Paranki Lagoon, i.e. the Paranki Lagoon Conservation Park, being zoned for conservation.

West Range is located within the federal division of Barker, the state electoral district of MacKillop and the local government area of the Kingston District Council.
