= Hundred of Lacepede =

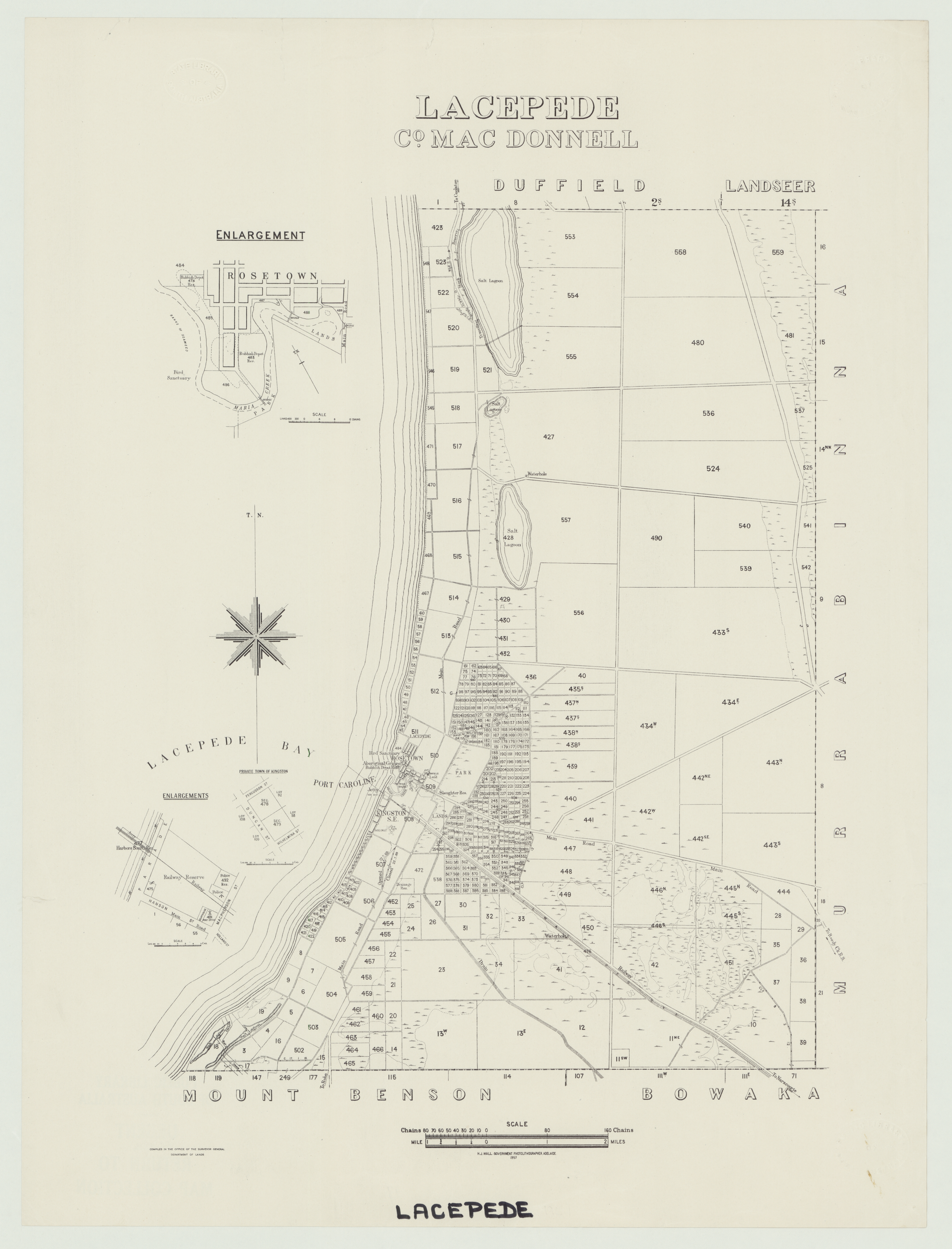
Hundred of Lacepede, 1957

The Hundred of Lacepede is a cadastral hundred of the County of MacDonnell on the Limestone Coast, South Australia.

It gave its name to the District Council of Lacepede and is centered on the town of Kingston SE, South Australia, near Lacepede Bay.

The traditional owners are the Ngarrindjeri people, who originally lived along the Coorong. The first European to explore this stretch of coastline was the French explorer Nicolas Baudin, who discovered Lacepede Bay in 1802.
