= Cassinia tegulata =

Avenue cassinia

Conservation status
- Critically endangered (EPBC Act)

Scientific classification
- Kingdom: Plantae
- Clade: Tracheophytes
- Clade: Angiosperms
- Clade: Eudicots
- Clade: Asterids
- Order: Asterales
- Family: Asteraceae
- Genus: Cassinia
- Species: C. tegulata

Binomial name
- Cassinia tegulata Orchard

Species of flowering plant

Cassinia tegulata commonly known as avenue cassinia, is a species of flowering plant in the family Asteraceae and is endemic to a small area near the Victoria-South Australia border. It is a small to medium-sized shrub with hairy foliage, needle-shaped leaves, and dense heads of off-white to cream-coloured flowers arranged in corymbs.

== Description ==
Cassinia tegulata is an erect shrub that typically grows to a height of 0.5–1.6 m (1 ft 8 in – 5 ft 3 in), its branches covered with woolly hairs when young. The leaves are narrow linear to needle-shaped, 15–35 mm (0.59–1.38 in) long and 1.0–1.5 mm (0.039–0.059 in) wide, the edges rolled under. The flower heads are 4.5–5.3 mm (0.18–0.21 in) long, off-white to cream-coloured, each head with four or five florets surrounded by about twenty-five overlapping involucral bracts in five whorls. The heads are arranged in groups of 100 to 150 in corymbs 20–70 mm (0.79–2.76 in) in diameter. Flowering occurs from February to April and the achenes are about 1.3 mm (0.051 in) long, with a pappus 2.0–2.5 mm (0.079–0.098 in) long.

== Taxonomy and naming ==
Cassinia tegulata was first formally described in 2004 by Anthony Edward Orchard in Australian Systematic Botany from specimens collected near Narracoorte in 2004.

== Distribution and habitat ==
Avenue cassinia grows in the shrubland, in roadside vegetation and in wetland between sand dunes. It occurs near Edenhope in far western Victoria and in Lucindale and Blackford in far south-eastern South Australia.

== Conservation status ==
This cassinia is listed as "critically endangered" under the Australian Government Environment Protection and Biodiversity Conservation Act 1999 and as "endangered" under the South Australian Government National Parks and Wildlife Act 1972. The main threats to the species include land clearing and roadwork maintenance, but fire has been shown to be a useful tool in regeneration of seedlings.
