= Binnum, South Australia =

Binnum South Australia
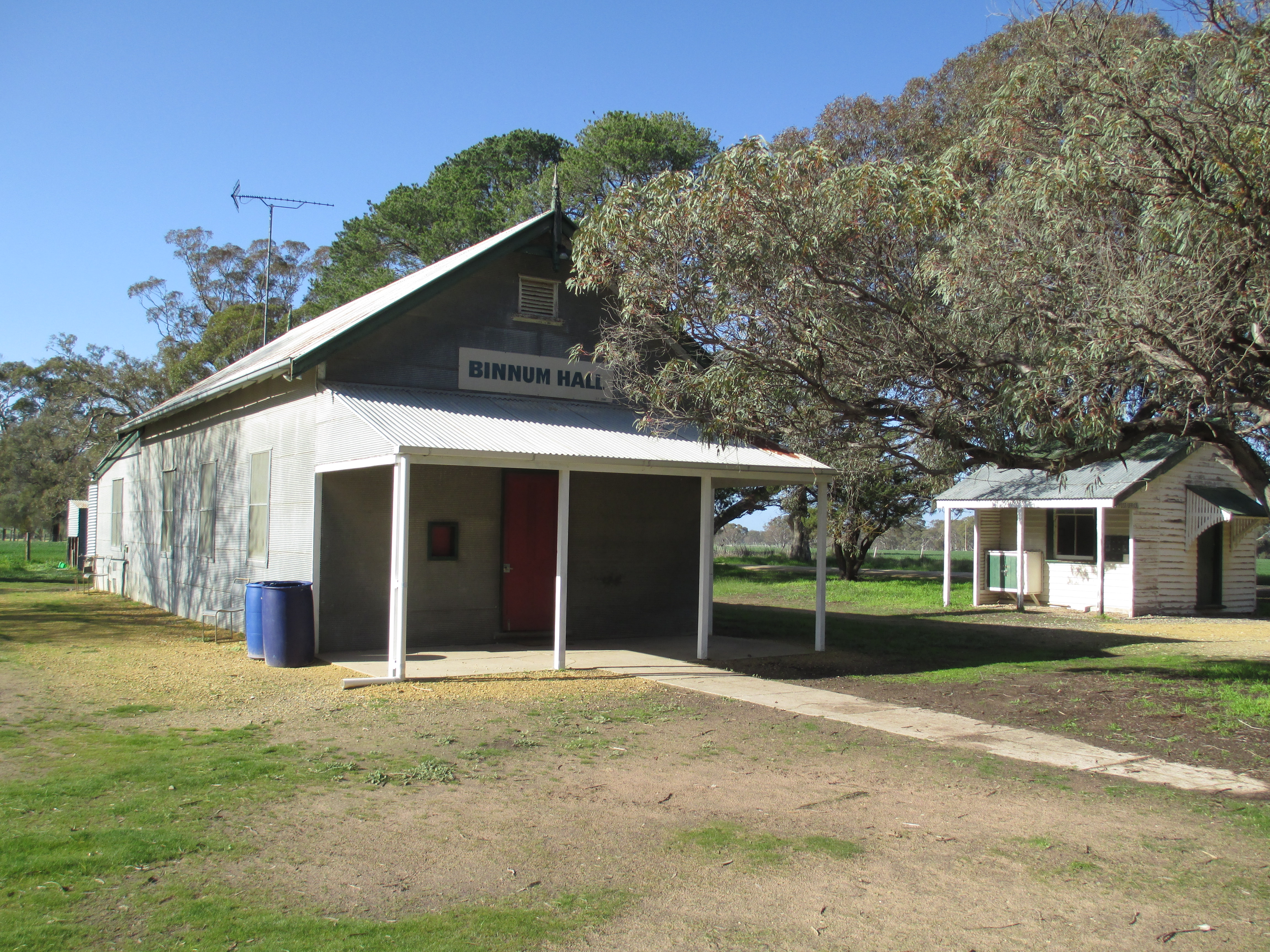
- Binnum Hall (left) and post office (right), 2016

- Coordinates: 36.7966°S 140.9347°E
- Population: 87 (SAL 2021)
- Established: 12 April 2001
- Elevation: 102 m (335 ft)
- LGA(s): Naracoorte Lucindale Council
- Region: Limestone Coast
- County: MacDonnell
- State electorate(s): MacKillop
- Federal division(s): Barker
Localities around Binnum:
The Gap	Frances	Neuarpurr, Victoria
Cadgee	Binnum
Wild Dog Valley	Kybybolite	Benayeo, Victoria

Binnum is a locality in the Australian state of South Australia.

Binnum is northeast of Naracoorte, on the Mount Gambier railway line between Naracoorte and Wolseley, adjacent to the Victorian border which closed on 12 April 1995.

There are 72 people who live in the village, according to a 2016 census.

Victorian member of parliament Sir William McDonald grew up at Binnum, before marrying and moving a short distance across the border to Neuarpurr, Victoria.

Binnum is located within the federal division of Barker, the state electoral district of MacKillop and the local government area of the Naracoorte Lucindale Council.
