= Hundred of Parsons (South Australia) =

- Cadastral division
- Coordinates: 36.537°S 140.522°E
- Country: Australia
- State: South Australia
- LGA(s): Tatiara District Council
- Established: 22 May 1884

Area
  - Total: 250 km^{2} (95 sq mi)
- County: County of MacDonnell
Lands administrative divisions around Hundred of Parsons
Willalooka	Wirrega	Wirrega
Marcollat	Parsons	Beeama
Marcollat	Glenroy	Beeama

The Hundred of Parsons is a cadastral division of the County of MacDonnell in southeastern South Australia. It was named on 22 May 1884 for politician John Langdon Parsons.

Two township of Padthaway, South Australia lies at the southern extremity of the hundred, overlapping into the Hundred of Glenroy. The hundred also includes Padthaway Conservation Park adjacent to the township. Parts of Mundulla West and Swede Flat overlap the northern boundary of the hundred.
