= Taratap, South Australia =

Taratap South Australia
- Coordinates: 36°35′16″S 139°55′04″E
- Population: 42 (2016 census)
- Established: 3 December 1998
- Postcode(s): 5267
- Time zone: ACST (UTC+9:30)
  - Summer (DST): ACST (UTC+10:30)
- Location: 223 km (139 mi) south-east of Adelaide; 27 km (17 mi) north of Kingston SE
- LGA(s): Kingston District Council
- Region: Limestone Coast
- County: MacDonnell
- State electorate(s): MacKillop
- Federal division(s): Barker
Mean max temp	Mean min temp	Annual rainfall
19.3 °C; 67 °F	10.4 °C; 51 °F	500.2 mm 19.7 in
Suburbs around Taratap:
Coorong	Tilley Swamp	Petherick
Coorong	Taratap	Keilira
West Range	Blackford	Keilira
- Footnotes: Locations; Climate; Adjoining localities

Taratap is a locality in the Australian state of South Australia located in the state's south-east about 223 kilometres (139 mi) south-east of the state capital of Adelaide and about 27 kilometres (17 mi) north-east of the municipal seat of Kingston SE.

Tarap's name and boundaries were assigned on 3 December 1998. Its name is derived from the Taratap triangulation station which itself is derived ultimately from “an Aboriginal waterhole in the Hundred of Peacock.” The name was also used for “a local homestead.”

The principal land use in the locality is "primary production."

The 2016 Australian census which was conducted in August 2016 reports that Taratap had a population of 42 people.

Taratap is located within the federal division of Barker, the state electoral district of Mackillop and the local government area of the Kingston District Council.
