= Betsy the Lobster =

Sculpture in Florida

- The sculpture in 2018
- Artist: Richard Blaze
- Year: 1985
- Medium: Fiberglass
- Subject: Caribbean spiny lobster
- Dimensions: 30 ft (9.1 m) high 40 ft (12 m) long
- Location: Rain Barrel Village
- 24.9592°N 80.5711°W

Betsy the Lobster is a sculpture in Islamorada, Florida depicting a large Caribbean spiny lobster. Made out of fiberglass, it is anatomically correct and was completed in 1985. It is the second-most photographed attraction in the Florida Keys, after the Southernmost Point Buoy.

== History ==
Richard Blaze, hired by a local restauranteur, created the sculpture over five years starting in 1980. It represents the impact the species has had on the culture of South Florida. It was made mostly in Marathon, Florida. When it was finished in 1985, the restaurant that had commissioned the sculpture had closed, so Tom Vellanti bought it and displayed it at his Treasure Village. The village was eventually turned into a school, so Betsy was put into storage. In 2009, the sculpture was moved to the Rain Barrel Village and was made into a roadside attraction. During transport, the lobster's twelve legs had to be removed and later reassembled.

== See also ==
- The World's Largest Lobster and Big Lobster, other large lobster sculptures in New Brunswick and South Australia, respectively
