= Reedy Creek, South Australia =

Reedy Creek
- Town
- Coordinates: 36°55′44″S 140°01′20″E
- Country: Australia
- State: South Australia
- Region: Limestone Coast
- LGA: Kingston District Council
- Established: 3 December 1998

Government
  - State electorate: MacKillop
  - Federal division: Barker
- Elevation: 15 m (49 ft)

Population
  - Total: 94 (2021 census)
- Postcode: 5275
- County: Robe
- Mean max temp: 19.3 °C (66.7 °F)
- Mean min temp: 10.3 °C (50.5 °F)
- Annual rainfall: 489.4 mm (19.27 in)
Localities around Reedy Creek
Kingston SE	Kingston SE; Blackford	Blackford
Kingston SE; Wangolina; Mount Benson	Reedy Creek	Avenue Range; Conmurra
Bray	Bray	Greenways

Reedy Creek is a locality located within the Kingston District Council in the Limestone Coast region of South Australia. The Kingston-Naracoorte railway line opened through the area on 1 September 1876. The Reedy Creek township grew around the railway siding. The railway closed in 1987.

The 2021 Australian census which was conducted in August 2021 reports that Reedy Creek had a population of 94 people.

Reedy Creek is located within the federal division of Barker and the state electoral district of Mackillop.
