= Avenue Range, South Australia =

Avenue Range South Australia
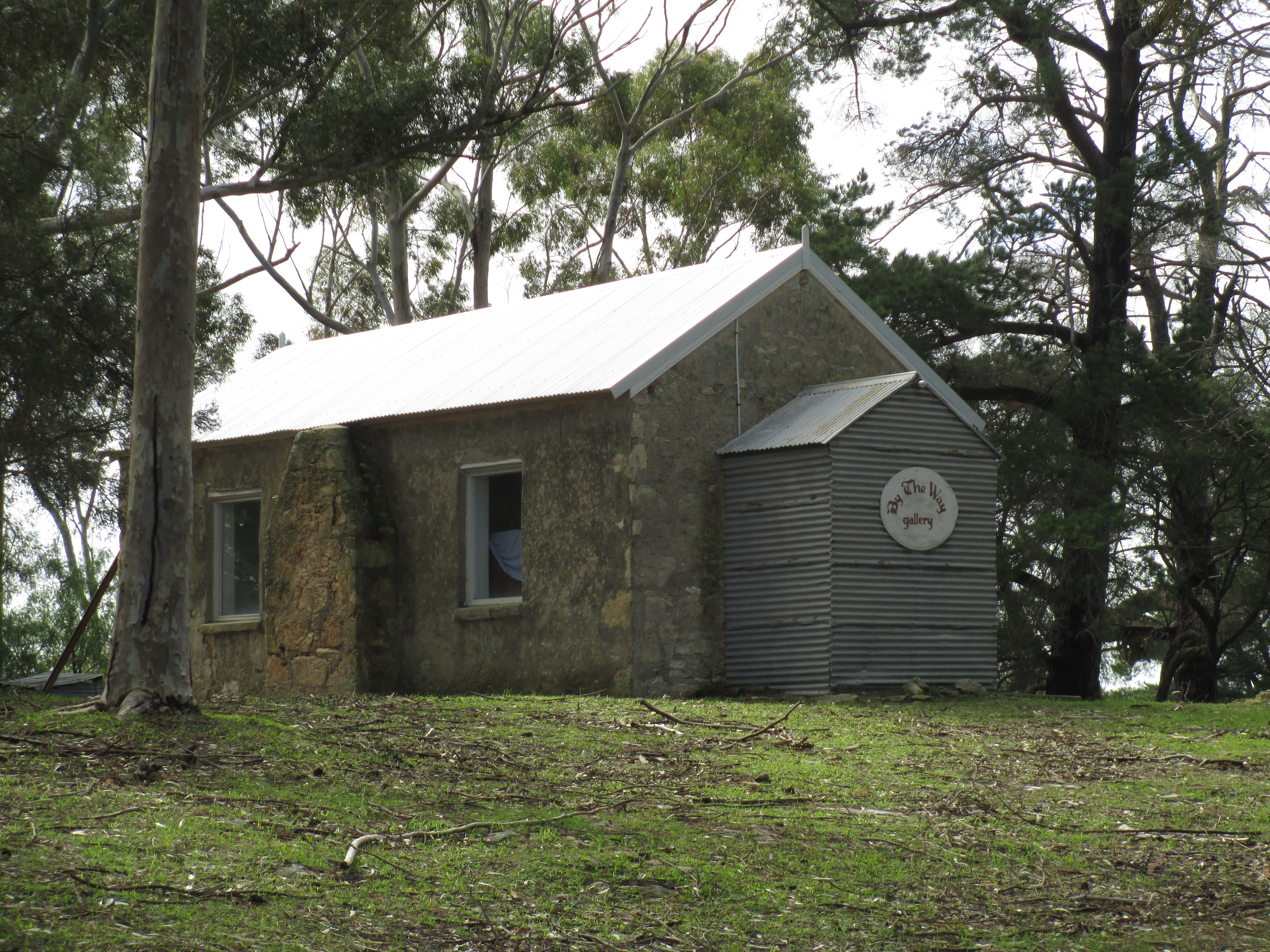
- Former school building at Avenue Range

- Coordinates: 36.925470°S 140.176110°E
- Population: 112 (SAL 2021)
- Established: 3 December 1998
- Postcode(s): 5273
- Time zone: ACST (UTC+9:30)
  - Summer (DST): ACST (UTC+10:30)
- Location: 265 km (165 mi) south-east of Adelaide city centre; 50 km (31 mi) west of Naracoorte
- LGA(s): Kingston District Council; Naracoorte Lucindale Council
- State electorate(s): MacKillop
- Federal division(s): Barker
Mean max temp	Mean min temp	Annual rainfall
21.2 °C; 70 °F	8.4 °C; 47 °F	601.7 mm 23.7 in
Localities around Avenue Range:
Blackford	Keilira	Woolumbool
Reedy Creek	Avenue Range	Lucindale
Reedy Creek	Conmurra	Lucindale
- Footnotes: Coordinates; Locations; Climate; Adjoining localities

Avenue Range (formerly Downer) is a locality in the Australian state of South Australia located in the state's south-east within the Limestone Coast region about 265 kilometres (165 miles) south east of the Adelaide city centre.

The traditional owners of this region are the Bungandidj (Boandik) people.

In 1843 a pastoralist named John ‘Jacky’ White acquired a run of 134 square miles spanning Reedy Creek, Keilira, Crower and Lucindale. He was the first European settler in Avenue Range.

Avenue Range was a stop on the Kingston-Naracoorte railway line. The first passenger train to travel on the line from Kingston to Naracoorte was on 1 September 1876 until the last on 28 November 1987 spanning 111 years.

The first Avenue school, named Downer School, was built south of the railway line and operated from 1890 to 1901. A new school, built on Council of Education land opened in 1901 and operated until 1955.

The locality includes the Cairnbank Homestead and Shearing Shed, which is listed on the South Australian Heritage Register.

Land within the locality is used exclusively for agriculture.

Avenue Range is located within the federal Division of Barker, the state electoral district of MacKillop, and the local government areas of the Kingston District Council and the Naracoorte Lucindale Council.

== See also ==
- Hundred of Townsend
