= Butchers Gap Conservation Park =

Protected area in South Australia

Butcher Gap Conservation Park
- IUCN category III (natural monument or feature)
- Location within South Australia
- Location: South Australia
- Nearest city: Kingston SE.
- Coordinates: 36°53′01.65″S 139°48′21.47″E
- Area: 1.8 km^{2} (0.69 sq mi)
- Established: 29 March 1990
- Governing body: Department for Environment and Water
- Website: http://www.environment.sa.gov.au/parks/Find_a_Park/Browse_by_region/Limestone_Coast/Butcher_Gap_Conservation_Park

Butcher Gap Conservation Park is a protected area located in the Limestone Coast of South Australia overlooking Lacepede Bay about 6 kilometres (3.7 miles) south of the town of Kingston SE. The conservation park was proclaimed under the National Parks and Wildlife Act 1972 in 1990.

The following statements from the conservation park's management plan summarises its conservation significance:

The park comprises the foredune and associated swale system surrounding a 40 hectares (99 acres) wetland area (including Salt lake and Butchers lake), bisected by the Butcher Gap Drain… The wetland supports an association of dense South Australian swamp paperbark (Melaleuca halmaturorum) over marine meadow, while the remainder of the Park is a coastal scrub association. A lease of the area of Butcher Gap drain that bisects the Park has been negotiated with the South Eastern Water Conservation and Drainage Board. The park is an important seasonal habitat for migratory bird species. The wetlands support a variety of waterfowl, including some migratory waders, however, its value to these species is not well understood… The park is recognised as suitable habitat for the endangered orange-bellied parrot (Neophema chrysogaster), which has been observed feeding on two-horned searocket (Cakile maritima) near the beach and in the extensive samphire habitat around Salt Lake.

The conservation park is classified as an IUCN Category III protected area.
