= Marcollat, South Australia =

Marcollat
- Suburb
- Coordinates: 36°35′20″S 140°20′29″E
- Country: Australia
- State: South Australia
- Region: Limestone Coast
- LGA: Kingston District Council
- Location: 236 km (147 mi) NW of Adelaide; 45 km (28 mi) N of Kingston
- Established: 3 December 1998

Government
  - State electorate: MacKillop
  - Federal division: Barker

Population
  - Total: 98 (SAL 2021)
- Time zone: UTC+9:30 (ACST)
  - Summer (DST): UTC+10:30 (ACST)
- Postcode: 5271
- County: MacDonnell
- Mean max temp: 21.5 °C (70.7 °F)
- Mean min temp: 8.6 °C (47.5 °F)
- Annual rainfall: 443.8 mm (17.47 in)
Suburbs around Marcollat
Petherick	Petherick; Willalooka	Swede Flat
Keilira	Marcollat	Swede Flat; Padthaway
Woolumbool	Woolumbool	Padthaway

Marcollat is a locality in the Australian state of South Australia located in the state’s Limestone Coast region about 236 kilometres (147 mi) south-east of the state capital of Adelaide and about 45 kilometres (28 mi) north of the municipal seat in Kingston SE.

Boundaries were created in December 1998 for “the long established name” which is derived from the cadastral unit of the Hundred of Marcollat.

Marcollat is located entirely within the Hundred of Marcollat with the hundred’s south-west corner including part of the adjoining locality of Keilira. The locality is served by the following roads - the Riddoch Highway which passes through the locality’s north-west corner from the north-west to the south-east en route to the regional centre of Mount Gambier and Rowney Road, described as a “secondary arterial road”, which passes from the north-east to the south-west en route to Kingston SE.

The principal land use within the locality is ‘primary production’ represented by “grazing (cattle and sheep) with some minor cropping (barley, safflower, sunflower)” with the following areas being reserved for conservation purposes - the Desert Camp Conservation Park, the Desert Camp Conservation Reserve and the Jip Jip Conservation Park.

Marcollat is located within the federal division of Barker, the state electoral district of MacKillop and the local government area of the Kingston District Council.
