= Big Lobster =

Sculpture by Paul Kelly

The Big Lobster
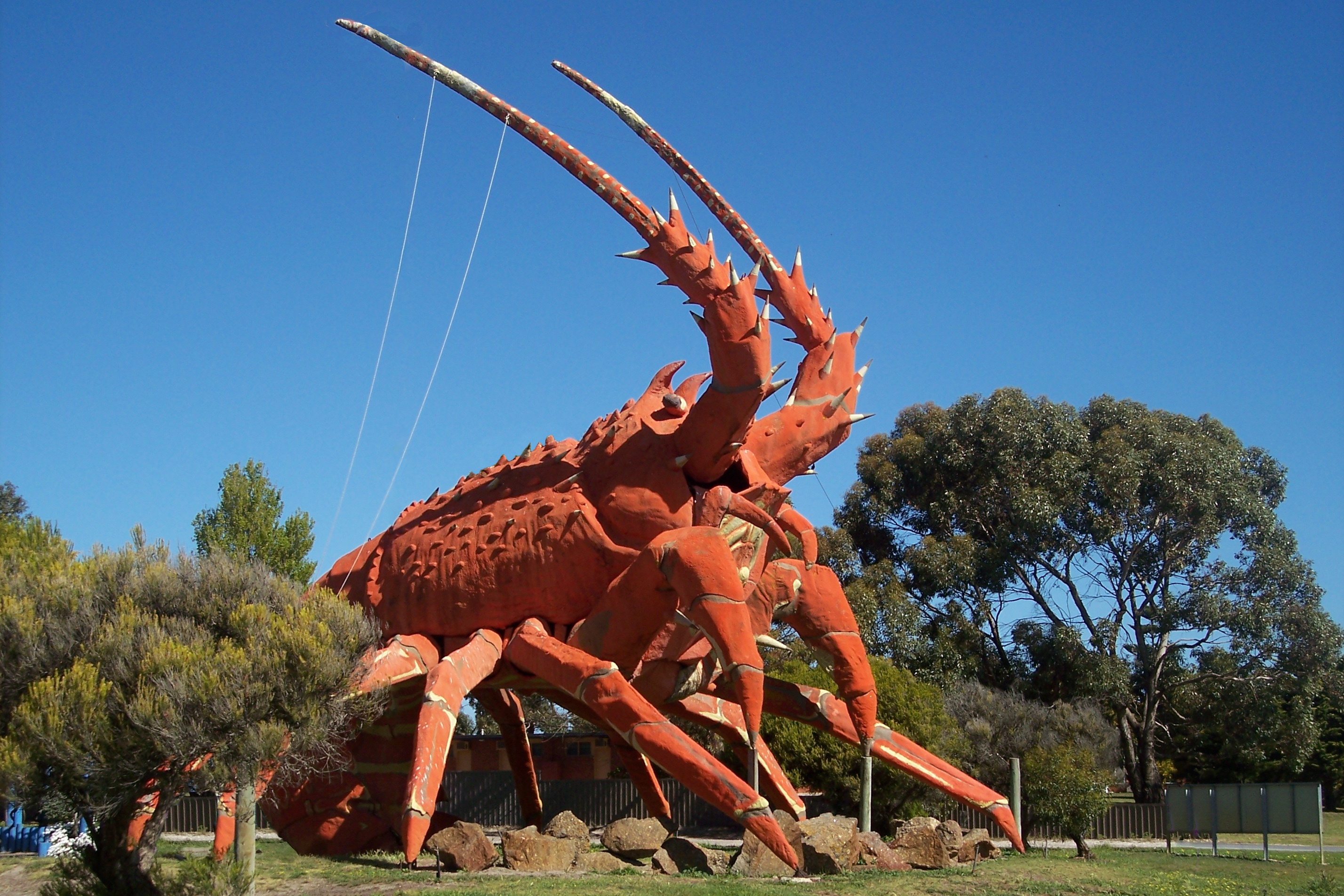
- Larry the Lobster

- Location within South Australia Location within Australia
- Designer: Paul Kelly
- Completion date: 15 December 1979
- Medium: Fibreglass over steel frame
- Dimensions: 18 m × 13.7 m × 15.2 m (59 ft × 45 ft × 50 ft)
- Weight: 4 tonnes
- Location: Kingston SE, South Australia; 36°49′25.6″S 139°51′47.5″E
- Owner: Ian Backler and Rob Moyse (1979–1984); Casey Sharpe and Jenna Lawrie (1984–present)

The Big Lobster is a tourist attraction located in the town of Kingston SE, South Australia. Known locally as Larry the Lobster, the sculpture of a spiny lobster stands 17 metres (56 ft) tall, and is regarded as one of the most impressive of Australia's Big Things. Designed and built by Paul Kelly for Ian Backler and Rob Moyse, it is made of steel and fibreglass and was intended to attract attention to the restaurant and visitor centre at which it is situated. The Big Lobster was opened on 15 December 1979 after six months of construction.

== History ==
The Big Lobster was originally conceived by Ian Backler. A local lobster fisherman, he formulated a plan to build a visitor centre in Kingston SE while travelling in the United States. Upon returning to Australia, he formed a partnership with Rob Moyse, and they engaged Ian Hannaford to develop the complex on a vacant block of land.

The Big Lobster was envisioned by the developers as a means of attracting attention to the centre, and initially, the lobster was intended to "rear up" over the front of the complex. Unfortunately, the plans changed when local council regulations forced the lobster to be repositioned in front of the visitor centre. Paul Kelly, who had previously built the Big Scotsman in North Adelaide, was employed to design and build the new structure. Kelly built the lobster in Edwardstown, South Australia, and the final product was transported by road to the site, where it was opened by the South Australian Premier David Tonkin on 15 December 1979.

Ian Backler and Rob Moyse ran the site for 15 years until selling it in 1984. The new owners operated the complex until 1990, when it was sold to Eric and Kath Peltz. The current owners, Jenna Lawrie and Casey Sharpe, purchased the property from the Peltz' in 2007 after it had been on the market for six years. They then renovated the site, making changes to the complex as well as steam cleaning the lobster, and formed plans to repaint "Larry" (as the lobster is locally known) as part of the process.

Radio duo Hamish and Andy launched the charity campaign #PinchAMate in early 2016 to promote the owners' crowdfunding campaign to restore the Lobster. The publicity enabled the campaign to reach its goal and Kingston's icon was restored to its original beauty.

== Design and construction ==
The Big Lobster is 17 metres high, 15.2 metres long and is 13.7 metres wide, with an approximate weight of 4 tonnes. The designer, Paul Kelly, modelled the structure on a lobster that he purchased and had stuffed for the purpose, and built it at warehouse out of a steel frame with a fibreglass shell. The details were carved out of foam prior to the application of the fibreglass, before transporting it and having it reassembled on site. The process took approximately six months.

The visitor complex at which it was sited originally consisted of a restaurant, tourist area, and a small theatrette. Under the current management, the restaurant has been altered to provide a more open-plan space, and it now incorporates the restaurant and a wine tasting area, with plans having been formulated to add accommodation and an accredited tourist centre to the venue.

== See also ==
- Australia's big things
- The World's Largest Lobster, a similar sculpture in Canada
- Betsy the Lobster, a similar sculpture in Florida
