= Desert Camp Conservation Park =

Protected area in South Australia

- IUCN category III (natural monument or feature)
- Location within South Australia
- Location: South Australia, Marcollat
- Nearest city: Keith.
- Coordinates: 36°29′02″S 140°21′07″E
- Area: 51 ha (130 acres)
- Established: 27 July 1967
- Visitors: ‘limited’ (in 1992)
- Governing body: Department for Environment and Water

Desert Camp Conservation Park (formerly Desert Camp National Parks Reserve and Desert Camp National Park) is a protected area in the Australian state of South Australia located in the state's Limestone Coast region in the gazetted locality of Marcollat about 44 kilometres (27 mi) south of the town centre in Keith.

The conservation park occupies land in sections 87 and 105 of the cadastral unit of the Hundred of Marcollat on the northern side of Rowney Road which is also known as the Kingston - Keith road. The land originally gained protected area status on 27 July 1967, when section 87 was gazetted under the National Parks Act 1966 as the Desert Camp National Park. Its name was amended to Desert Camp National Parks Reserve on 9 November 1967. Section 105 came in existence about 14 months later after work to Rowney Road resulted in it being “severed … from an adjoining lease”. Section 105 was subsequently added on 21 November 1968 to the national parks reserve. In 1972, the national parks reserve was reconstituted as the Desert Camp Conservation Park upon the proclamation of the National Parks and Wildlife Act 1972.

In 1992, the conservation park was described as follows:

(It) is located in the Angle Rock Environmental Association… This association is characterised by interdunal plains with occasional low narrow dune ridges and isolated granite outcrops. Soils are moderately deep, alkaline, sandy, pedal, mottled-yellow duplex soils… These soils support an open woodland of pink gum (Eucalyptus fasciculosa) over a heath understorey of mallee honey-myrtle (Melaleuca brevifolia), broombush (M. uncinata), austral grass tree (Xanthorrhoea australis), slaty sheoak (Allocasuarina muelleriana) and desert hakea (Hakea muelleriana).

As of 1992, there was “limited visitation” with the main visitor groups being “bird observers and field naturalists”.

The conservation park is classified as an IUCN Category III protected area. In 1980, it was listed on the now-defunct Register of the National Estate.

== See also ==
- Protected areas of South Australia
