= Pinks Beach, South Australia =

Pinks Beach
- Suburb
- Coordinates: 36°52′12″S 139°49′14″E
- Country: Australia
- State: South Australia
- LGA: Kingston District Council
- Established: 3 December 1998

Government
  - State electorate: MacKillop
  - Federal division: Barker

Population
  - Total: 87 (2021 census)
- Postcode: 5275

Pinks Beach is a locality located within the Kingston District Council in the Limestone Coast region of South Australia.
