= Rosetown, South Australia =

Rosetown
- Town
- Coordinates: 36°49′26″S 139°51′45″E
- Country: Australia
- State: South Australia
- LGA: Kingston District Council
- Established: 3 December 1998

Government
  - State electorate: MacKillop
  - Federal division: Barker

Population
  - Total: 165 (2021 census)
- Postcode: 5275

Rosetown is a locality located within the Kingston District Council in the Limestone Coast region of South Australia.
