= Keilira, South Australia =

Keilira South Australia
- Coordinates: 36°41′26″S 140°08′55″E
- Population: 58 (2021 census)
- Established: 3 December 1998
- Postcode(s): 5275
- Time zone: ACST (UTC+9:30)
  - Summer (DST): ACST (UTC+10:30)
- LGA(s): Kingston District Council
- Region: Limestone Coast
- County: MacDonnell
- State electorate(s): MacKillop
- Federal division(s): Barker
Mean max temp	Mean min temp	Annual rainfall
21.5 °C; 71 °F	8.6 °C; 47 °F	465.5 mm 18.3 in
Suburbs around Keilira:
Tilley Swamp	Tilley Swamp; Petherick	Petherick
Taratap; Blackford	Keilira	Marcollat; Woolumbool
Blackford; Avenue Range	Avenue Range	Woolumbool
- Footnotes: Adjoining localities

Keilira is a locality located within the Kingston District Council in the Limestone Coast region of South Australia.

== Demographics ==
As of the 2021 Australian census, 58 people resided in Keilira, down from 78 in the 2016 census. The median age of persons in Keilira was 39 years. There were equal amount of males and females, with 50% of the population male and female. The average household size was 2.7 people per household.
