= Padthaway, South Australia =

Town in Australia

Padthaway
- Town
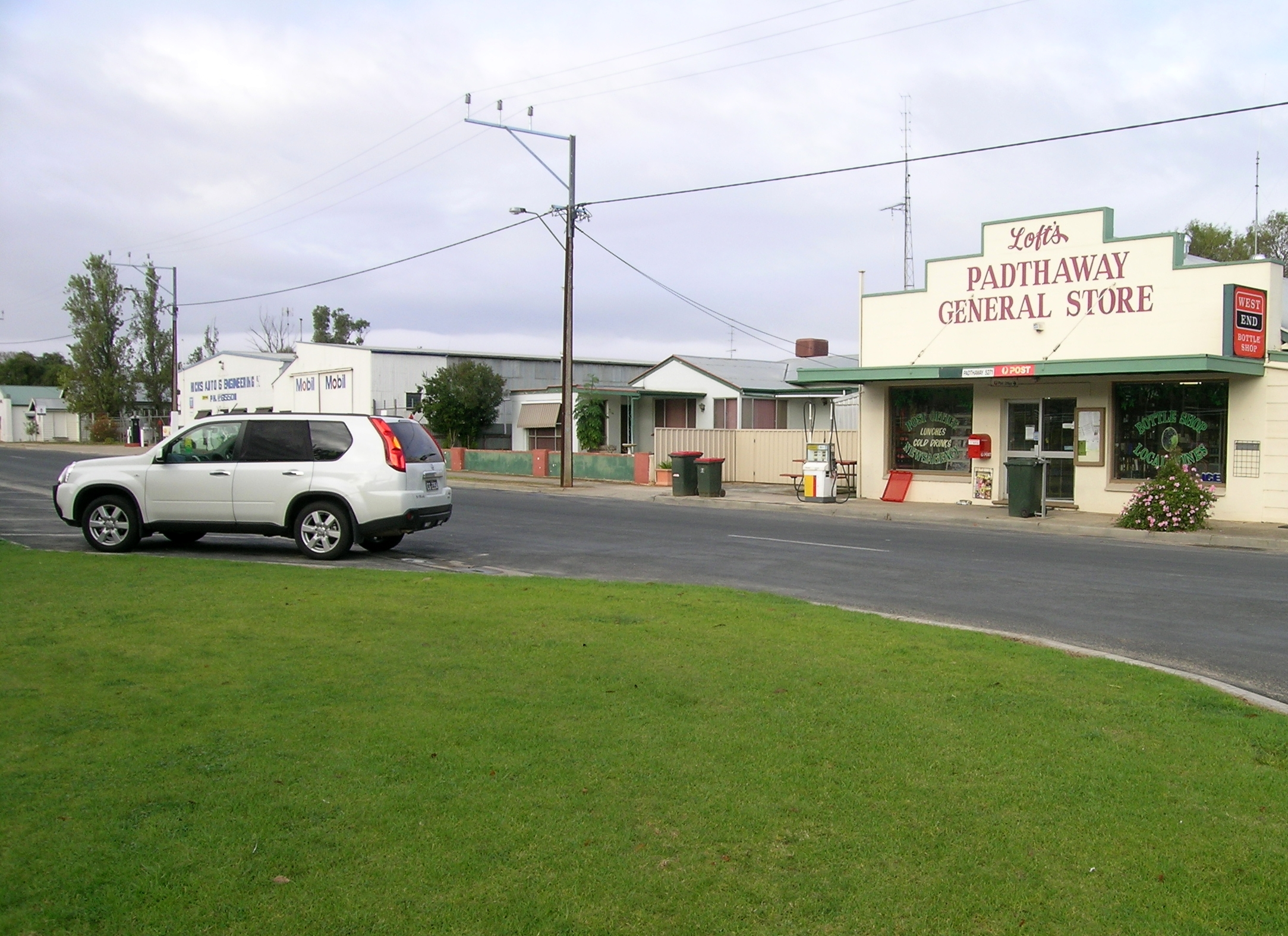
- Main street of Padthaway, 2011

- Coordinates: 36°36′14″S 140°29′26″E
- Country: Australia
- State: South Australia
- Region: Limestone Coast
- LGA: Tatiara District Council
- Location: 253 km (157 mi) SE of Adelaide; 41 km (25 mi) SW of Bordertown
- Established: 10 April 1952 (town); 16 March 2000 (locality)

Government
  - State electorate: MacKillop
  - Federal division: Barker
- Elevation: 37 m (121 ft)

Population
  - Total: 418 (2016 census)
- Time zone: UTC+9:30 (ACST)
  - Summer (DST): UTC+10:30 (ACDT)
- Postcode: 5271
- County: MacDonnell
- Mean max temp: 21.4 °C (70.5 °F)
- Mean min temp: 8.5 °C (47.3 °F)
- Annual rainfall: 474.2 mm (18.67 in)
Localities around Padthaway
Marcollat	Swede Flat; Mundulla West	Western Flat
Marcollat	Padthaway	Western Flat; The Gap
Woolumbool	Keppoch	The Gap

Padthaway (/ˈpædθəweɪ/ PAD-thə-way) is a small town in the south-east of the Australian state of South Australia, located within the Limestone Coast region, about 253 kilometres (157 miles) south-east of the state capital of Adelaide and about 41 kilometres (25 miles) south-east of the municipal seat of Bordertown.

The original inhabitants of the area are the indigenous Bodaruwitj people, who have inhabited their country for tens of thousands of years. While it's agreed that the name of the town and its associated wine region is derived from the Bodaruwitj language, the precise origin is not definitely agreed. However, the most widely accepted origin is the Bodaruwitj word "potawurutj", which has been translated as "good water".

Padthaway is in the Tatiara District Council, the state electorate of MacKillop and the federal Division of Barker. The 2016 Australian census which was conducted in August 2016 reports that Padthaway had a population of 418 people.

== History ==
Padthaway was the name of the first pastoral station, which was established on Bodaruwitj land in 1847 by a successful Scottish businessman, Robert Lawson. In 1882, the Padthaway Estate Homestead was built by Eliza and Robert Lawson. The historic Padthaway Estate complex is listed on the South Australian Heritage Register.

In 1952, Padthaway became the centre of a soldier settlement scheme. The first vineyards were planted in 1964 and quickly transformed marginal grazing land into an extensive wine-producing region. White wines from the area are regular winners of major awards, which can be purchased at the local cellar door sales and at wine retailers around Australia. Agriculture is also extensive in Padthaway, with onion, olives and seeds being grown, along with sheep and cattle which are reared for sale.

Padthaway has a cluster of businesses in the heart of town including a deli, general store, two rural service centres, an auto and engineering centre, a caravan park, and a park with a playground in the main street, Memorial Drive.

Other public amenities include netball and tennis courts, football oval, town hall, sports complex, medical clinic, playground, skate park and rotunda. The toilets are adjacent to the playground. In 2010 a new medical clinic was built.

The Padthaway Conservation Park, which is situated on a former coastal dune, is about 2.5 kilometres (1.6 mi) north-east of the town centre. The conservation park has stands of yellow gum, ribbon gum, brown stringybark, manna gums, many acacias and banksias. It is also home to a variety of animals including koalas, birds, rabbits, kangaroos and many insects. Sometimes the rare fire orchid may be viewed in flower.

== Wine region ==
Padthaway is also the name of a wine region surrounding the town. It is home to several large commercial vineyards. The oldest vineyard was established in 1964 by Seppelts, with Lindeman's, Hardys and Wynns also establishing vineyards in that decade. The wine region is 62 kilometres (39 miles) long and 8 kilometres (5 miles) wide, with over 4,000 hectares (9,900 acres) of vineyards. There are only a few cellar doors operating in the region.

== Sports ==
Records of lawn bowls being played in Padthaway go back to 1963. Lawn bowls is played in Padthaway on Saturday during the summer time. Padthaway bowling club plays in the Upper South East association.

The last A grade cricket premiership Padthaway won was in 1993. Padthaway has had a B grade side most years since. Padthaway came fifth in the competition in 2010–2011. In 2011, there was only one competition, an A grade side.

Netball has been played in Padthaway since the mid-late 1960s. In 2011 the Padthaway Netball Club, also called the Lions, has more than seven different teams for netball.

The Padthaway Football Club, which commenced in 1967, is known as the Lions, competing in the Kowree-Naracoorte-Tatiara Football League. The club won an A grade premiership grand final in 1993 against Bordertown.

The Padthaway Tennis Club dates back to 1962 and the club laid new concrete courts in 1972. The club won many premierships between the mid-1970s and into the late 1980s. Tennis is currently played as a social competition on Wednesday nights for a six-eight-week season in the summer before Christmas.

The Padthaway golf course was carved out of scrubland. This tight course is a challenge even for the most professional of golfers. The Padthaway golf club was opened in 1988 and has nine holes with scrapes.

== The community ==
Apex is a community group which operates in Padthaway composed of men between the ages of 18 and 45 who work together to promote social justice and raise awareness of charity causes by fundraising in interesting and creative ways.

Padthaway has an active Women in Agricultural Business group. WAB is a statewide network with branches throughout SA. It is an organisation for women interested in rural, agricultural and business issues. It provides the opportunity for self-development and friendship.

== Schools ==
The school was built in 1935 and had its 75-year anniversary in 2010. The event was attended by many past, current and future students and staff and a time capsule was buried on the day. In 2011, Padthaway Primary School had 52 students and 12 staff members. Padthaway Primary School caters for years Reception-7 and also has a Child Parent Centre (CPC). At Padthaway Primary School the Student Representative Council (SRC) organises many fundraising activities for students to participate in.

Padthaway Primary School is a school with many activities for students such as the Come out, SAPSASA, Youth Environmental Forum, pancake day, Student Young Leaders Day and school camp. SAPSASA events include football, netball, cricket, tennis, cross country, athletics running events, swimming, diving, golf, hockey and skiing.

== Climate ==
Padthaway has a warm-summer mediterranean climate (Köppen: Csb), with very warm, dry summers (with high diurnal temperature variation) and cool, relatively wet winters. Average maxima range from 29.4 °C (84.9 °F) in January to 14.3 °C (57.7 °F) in July and average minima fluctuate between 12.6 °C (54.7 °F) in January and 5.5 °C (41.9 °F) in July. Mean average annual rainfall is 475.6 mm (18.72 in), spread between 140.9 precipitation days. Annually, the town only experiences 41.5 clear days, whilst having 110.6 cloudy days. Extreme temperatures have ranged from −4.0 °C (24.8 °F) on 23 June 2019 to 46.1 °C (115.0 °F) on 20 December 2019.

Climate data for Padthaway (36º39'00"S, 140º31'12"E, 37 m AMSL) (2000-2024 normals, 1977-2025 extremes, sun 1978-2000)
Month	Jan	Feb	Mar	Apr	May	Jun	Jul	Aug	Sep	Oct	Nov	Dec	Year
Record high °C (°F)	45.1 (113.2)	44.4 (111.9)	41.5 (106.7)	36.2 (97.2)	30.4 (86.7)	23.9 (75.0)	20.7 (69.3)	27.4 (81.3)	33.5 (92.3)	37.1 (98.8)	40.7 (105.3)	46.1 (115.0)	46.1 (115.0)
Mean daily maximum °C (°F)	29.4 (84.9)	28.5 (83.3)	26.0 (78.8)	21.9 (71.4)	17.6 (63.7)	14.9 (58.8)	14.3 (57.7)	15.4 (59.7)	17.8 (64.0)	20.8 (69.4)	24.3 (75.7)	26.8 (80.2)	21.5 (70.6)
Mean daily minimum °C (°F)	12.6 (54.7)	12.2 (54.0)	10.5 (50.9)	8.2 (46.8)	6.9 (44.4)	5.6 (42.1)	5.5 (41.9)	5.8 (42.4)	6.9 (44.4)	7.7 (45.9)	9.5 (49.1)	10.7 (51.3)	8.5 (47.3)
Record low °C (°F)	1.8 (35.2)	2.0 (35.6)	1.0 (33.8)	−1.6 (29.1)	−4.5 (23.9)	−4.0 (24.8)	−3.5 (25.7)	−3.8 (25.2)	−1.7 (28.9)	−3.1 (26.4)	−1.0 (30.2)	1.5 (34.7)	−4.5 (23.9)
Average precipitation mm (inches)	23.7 (0.93)	17.2 (0.68)	22.7 (0.89)	28.3 (1.11)	44.6 (1.76)	57.7 (2.27)	64.0 (2.52)	69.6 (2.74)	44.0 (1.73)	39.9 (1.57)	31.8 (1.25)	31.3 (1.23)	475.6 (18.72)
Average precipitation days (≥ 0.2 mm)	4.8	4.7	6.9	9.8	15.1	17.0	19.2	19.0	15.4	12.1	8.8	8.1	140.9
Average afternoon relative humidity (%)	35	37	39	47	62	68	69	64	60	49	43	38	51
Average dew point °C (°F)	8.7 (47.7)	9.6 (49.3)	8.4 (47.1)	8.1 (46.6)	8.6 (47.5)	8.0 (46.4)	7.5 (45.5)	7.1 (44.8)	7.8 (46.0)	6.5 (43.7)	8.4 (47.1)	7.7 (45.9)	8.0 (46.5)
Mean monthly sunshine hours	298.7	265.6	235.6	183.0	142.6	126.0	145.7	170.5	180.0	235.6	246.0	269.7	2,499
Percentage possible sunshine	67	70	62	55	45	43	47	51	51	58	58	60	56
Source: Bureau of Meteorology (2000-2024 normals, 1977-2024 extremes, sun 1978-2000) all-time extreme temperature
