= Kingston District Council =

Coordinates: 36°50′S 139°51′E

- Local government area
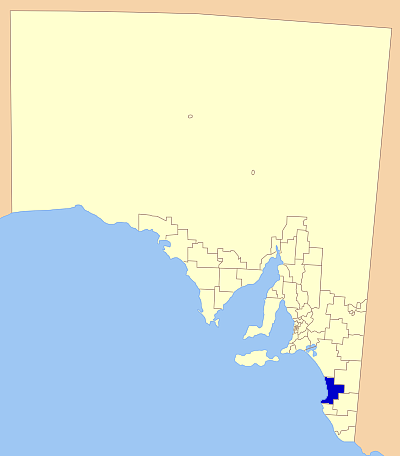
- Position of the Kingston District Council

- Interactive map of Kingston District Council
- Country: Australia
- State: South Australia
- Region: Limestone Coast
- Established: 1873
- Council seat: Kingston SE

Government
  - Mayor: Kay Rasheed
  - State electorate: MacKillop
  - Federal division: Barker

Area
  - Total: 3,337.7 km^{2} (1,288.7 sq mi)

Population
  - Total: 2,326 (LGA 2021)
  - Density: 0.70/km^{2} (1.8/sq mi)
- Website: Kingston District Council
LGAs around Kingston District Council
The Coorong District Council	Tatiara District Council
Kingston District Council
District Council of Robe	Naracoorte Lucindale Council

The Kingston District Council (formerly District Council of Lacepede) is a local government area in the Limestone Coast, South Australia established in 1873. Kingston SE is the largest town of the district and also the seat of council.

The district is mostly reliant on agriculture, particularly cereal crops, sheep and cattle. Cape Jaffa also hosts a lobster fishing fleet, with other commercial fishing also providing part of the area's economy.

Tourism also plays a minor role, with Kingston SE a minor tourist destination, noted for its 'Big Lobster', with Mount Scott Conservation Park and Butchers Gap Conservation Park also located in the district.

== History ==
The area was originally settled by the Ngarrindjeri Aborigines, who lived along the Coorong and extended across the Murray River to the present day site of Goolwa.

The first European to make contact with this stretch of coastline was the French explorer Nicolas Baudin who discovered Lacepede Bay in 1802. In 1840, the Brigantine Maria was shipwrecked near Cape Jaffa after leaving Port Adelaide. All 25 people aboard were massacred by Aborigines along the Coorong.

The town of Kingston was established in 1856, the town being named after the government surveyor, George Strickland Kingston by Governor McDonnell, in 1858 and renamed as Kingston SE in July 1940.

The District Council of Lacepede was established on 4 July 1873 to serve the growing area. The name was changed to the present designation on 1 July 2000. Mayor Legoe justified the change at the ceremony, stating; "The decision to change the name of the Council was not a decision to change for the sake of change. It is a decision to change the image and identity of the Council to propel itself into the 21st Century".

== Localities ==
The district council includes the following localities - Avenue Range (part), Blackford, Cape Jaffa, Coorong, Keilira, Kingston SE, Marcollat, Pinks Beach, Reedy Creek, Rosetown, Sandy Grove, Taratap, Tilley Swamp, Wangolina, West Range and Wyomi.

== Councillors ==
Ward	Councillor	Notes
Mayor	Jeff Pope	
Unsubdivided	Christopher England	
Unsubdivided	William Armfield	
Unsubdivided	Tim Harding	
Unsubdivided	James Starling	
Unsubdivided	Fiona Rasheed	
Unsubdivided	Jamie Parkins	
Unsubdivided	Carol Koch	

Kingston District Council has a directly elected mayor.
