= Blackford, South Australia =

Blackford
- Town
- Interactive map of Blackford
- Coordinates: 36°46′59″S 140°1′17″E
- Country: Australia
- State: South Australia
- LGA: Kingston District Council
- Location: 22 km (14 mi) east of Kingston SE
- Established: 3 December 1998

Government
  - State electorate: MacKillop
  - Federal division: Barker

Population
  - Total: 35 (2021 census)
- Postcode: 5275
Localities around Blackford
	Taratap
West Range	Blackford	Keilira
Kingston SE	Reedy Creek	Avenue Range

Blackford is a locality within the Kingston District Council in the Limestone Coast region of South Australia.

The locality boundaries include the Mount Scott Conservation Park.

Most of the Hundred of Murrabinna is contained in the locality of Blackford. The northern boundary is coincident, but the locality extends east and west beyond the hundred into the hundreds of Minecrow and Lacepede respectively and the southern end of the hundred of Murrabinna is in the boundaries of the locality of Reedy Creek.
