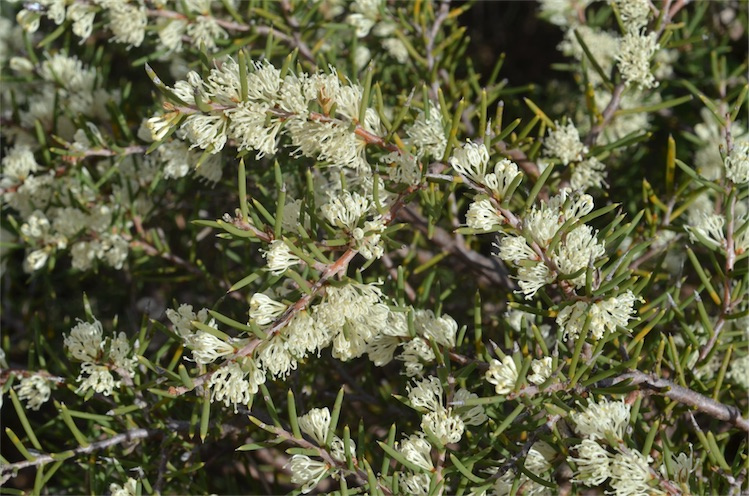

Scientific classification
- Kingdom: Plantae
- Clade: Tracheophytes
- Clade: Angiosperms
- Clade: Eudicots
- Order: Proteales
- Family: Proteaceae
- Genus: Hakea
- Species: H. rugosa

Binomial name
- Hakea rugosa R.Br.
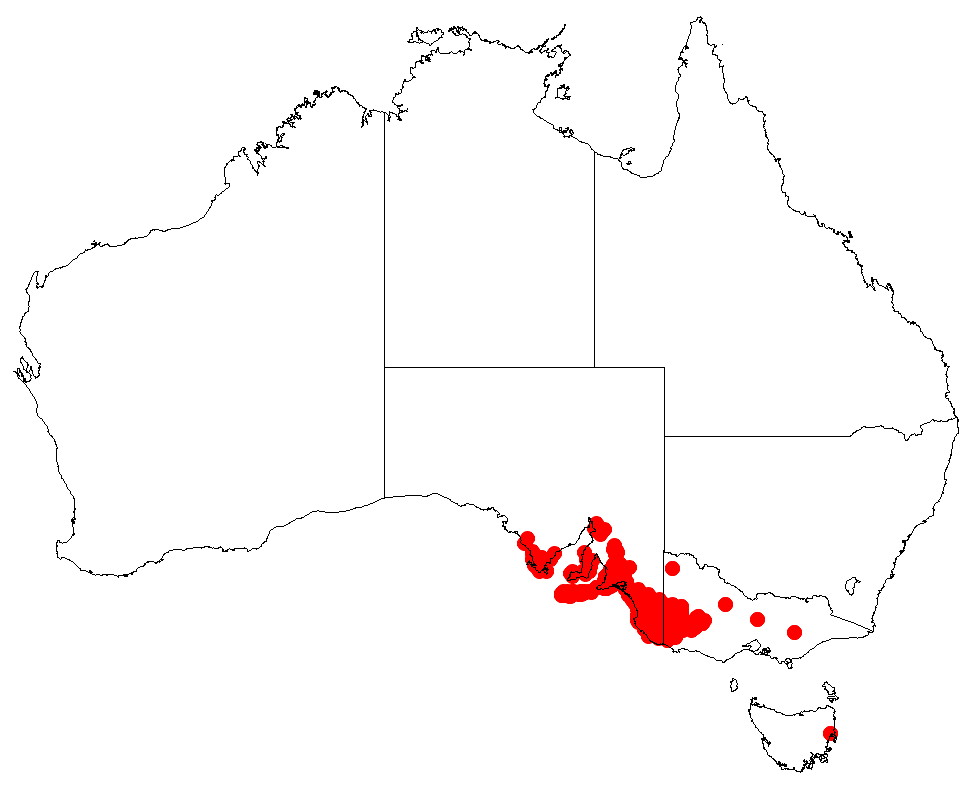
- Occurrence data from AVH

= Hakea rugosa =

Wrinkled hakea

Species of shrub native to Australia

Hakea rugosa, commonly known as wrinkled hakea or dwarf hakea, is a shrub of the family Proteaceae native to Australia. It has sharp needle-shaped leaves and white or cream fragrant flowers in profusion from August to October.

== Description ==
Hakea rugosa is a wide-spreading shrub 0.7–2 m (2 ft 4 in – 6 ft 7 in) high with stiff, straight needle-shaped leaves 1.5–6 cm (0.59–2.36 in) long and 0.9–1.3 mm (0.035–0.051 in) wide. The new growth leaves and branches are covered in flattened, short, silky hairs. The inflorescence consists of densely clustered cream or white flowers in profusion in the leaf axils. The pedicel is 2.0–3.5 mm (0.079–0.138 in) long and covered with flattened silky hairs. The perianth 3–3.5 mm (0.12–0.14 in) long with silky hairs at the base, the pistil 4.5–6 mm (0.18–0.24 in) long and upright. The small, S-shaped fruit are more or less at right angle to the stalk, 1.5–2.2 cm (0.59–0.87 in) long and 0.7–1.6 cm (0.28–0.63 in) wide. The fruit are coarsely wrinkled, occasionally with fine dark warts and the 3–7 mm (0.12–0.28 in) long narrow beak is bent sharply back onto the fruit. Flowering occurs from August to October.

== Taxonomy and naming ==
Hakea rugosa was first described in 1810 by botanist Robert Brown and published the description in Transactions of the Linnean Society of London. The specific epithet (rugosa) is derived from the Latin, rugosus,-a,-um or "wrinkle", giving wrinkled, rugose.

== Distribution and habitat ==
Dwarf hakea grows on loam or sand in mallee scrub or coastal heath from Eyre Peninsula in South Australia to western Victoria.
