= Sandy Grove, South Australia =

Sandy Grove South Australia
- Coordinates: 36°52′20″S 139°50′17″E
- Population: 108 (2016 census)
- Established: 3 December 1998
- Postcode(s): 5275
- LGA(s): Kingston District Council
- State electorate(s): MacKillop
- Federal division(s): Barker

Sandy Grove is a locality located within the Kingston District Council in the Limestone Coast region of South Australia.
