= Lochaber, South Australia =

Lochaber South Australia
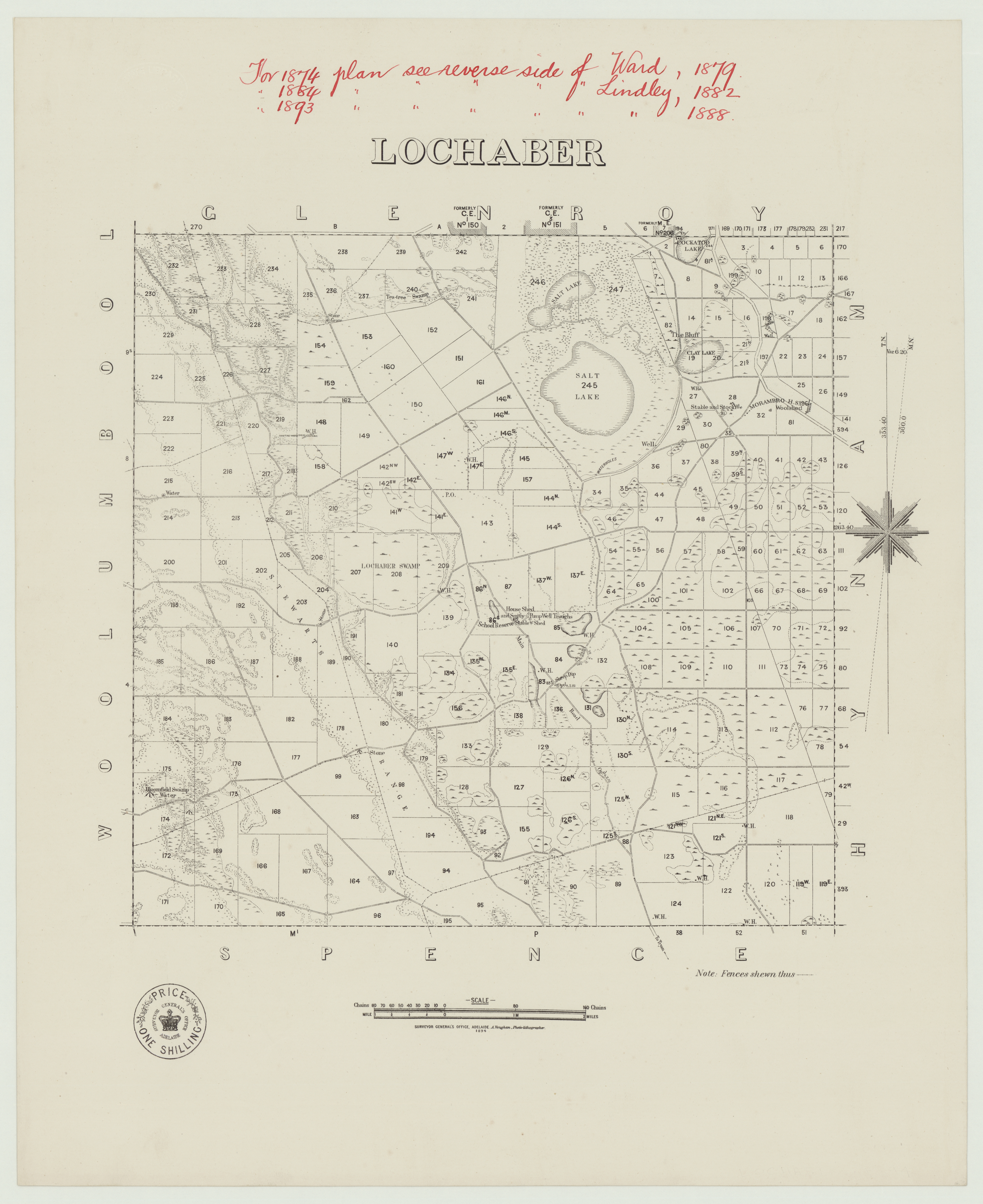
- Hundred of Lochaber, 1894

- Coordinates: 36°49′28″S 140°35′27″E
- Population: 122 (SAL 2021)
- Established: 12 April 2001
- Postcode(s): 5271
- Time zone: ACST (UTC+9:30)
  - Summer (DST): ACST (UTC+10:30)
- LGA(s): Naracoorte Lucindale Council
- Region: Limestone Coast
- County: MacDonnell
- State electorate(s): MacKillop
- Federal division(s): Barker

Lochaber is a locality located within the Naracoorte Lucindale Council in the Limestone Coast region of South Australia.

Lochaber is located within the federal division of Barker, the state electoral district of MacKillop and the local government area of the Naracoorte Lucindale Council.
