= The Gap, South Australia =

The Gap
- Town
- Coordinates: 36°42′14″S 140°44′19″E
- Country: Australia
- State: South Australia
- LGA: Naracoorte Lucindale Council
- Established: 12 April 2001

Government
  - State electorate: MacKillop
  - Federal division: Barker

Population
  - Total: 26 (2021 census)
- Postcode: 5271

The Gap is a locality located within the Naracoorte Lucindale Council in the Limestone Coast region of South Australia.
