= Lacepede Bay =

- Location in South Australia
- Location: Limestone Coast, South Australia
- Coordinates: 36°48′56″S 139°48′05″E
- Type: Bay
- Basin countries: Australia
- Max. length: 40.98 km (25.46 mi)
- Max. width: 10 km (6.2 mi)
- Max. depth: 11.0 m (36.1 ft)
- Settlements: Kingston, SE; Cape Jaffa

Lacepede Bay (locally /ˈlæsəˌpiːd/ LASS-ə-peed, French: Baie Lacépède) is a bay in the Australian state of South Australia located on the state's south-east coast about 140 kilometres (87 miles) northwest of Mount Gambier and about 240 kilometres (150 miles) southeast of Adelaide. It was named in 1802 by the Baudin expedition of 1800-03 after Bernard Germain de Lacépède, the French naturalist. It is one of four ‘historic bays’ located on the South Australian coast.

== Description ==
Lacepede Bay was named in 1802 by Peron and Freycinet of the Baudin expedition of 1800-03 after Bernard Germain de Lacépède, the French naturalist. Lacepede Bay lies between a locality known as Granite Rocks at its northern extremity and Cape Jaffa at its southern extremity on the south-east coast of South Australia. The bay is described as:

The sandy shore is backed by sandhills, gradually decreasing in height, for a distance of 7 nautical miles (13 km) S[outh] of Granite Rocks. Kingston is situated on the S[outh] side of the entrance to Maria Creek, at the head of the bay. Between Kingston and Cape Jaffa, the land is low and swampy, with a wooded bank behind the sandy beach; there is a prominent white sand patch on the bank above the beach, 9 nautical miles (17 km) SW of Kingston.

Lacepede Bay is one of four bays on the South Australian coast considered by the Australian government to be a ‘historic bay’ under the Seas and Submerged Lands Act 1973 and was proclaimed as such in 1987 and again in 2006 and 2016 with the result that the mouth of the bay is on the territorial seas baseline and the waters within the bay are internal waters as per the definition used in United Nations Convention on the Law of the Sea.

The following settlements are located on its shores: Kingston, SE and Cape Jaffa. Both settlements have port infrastructure consisting of jetties and while Cape Jaffa has a marina. The following protected areas are located within the bay's waters or adjoin its extent: the Upper South East Marine Park and the Butchers Gap Conservation Park.
