= Kingston SE =

- Town
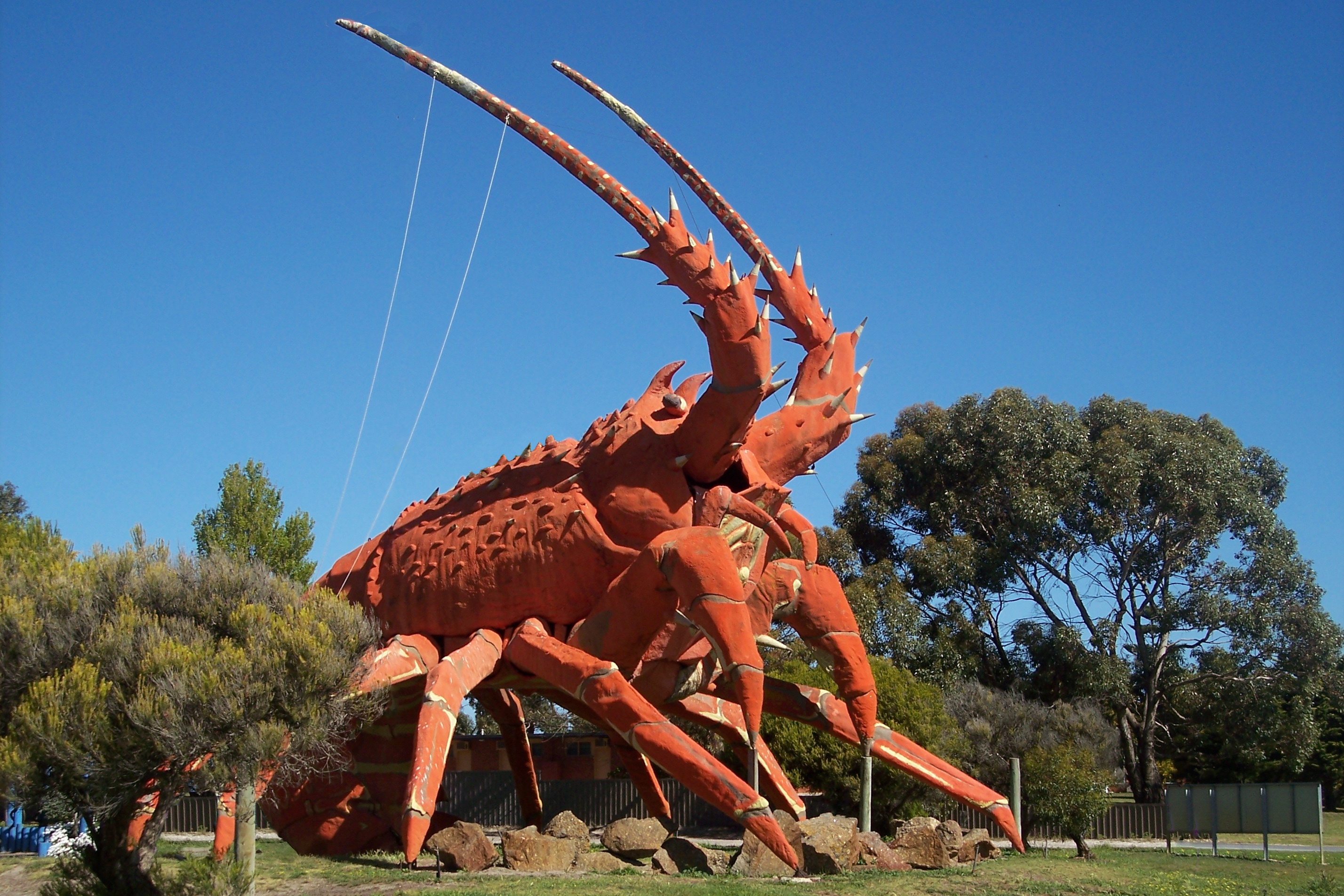
- Lobster sculpture located at the entrance to the town

- Coordinates: 36°49′S 139°51′E
- Country: Australia
- State: South Australia
- LGA: Kingston District Council
- Location: 240 km (150 mi) SE of Adelaide city centre; 138 km (86 mi) NW of Mount Gambier
- Established: 1861 (town); 3 December 1998 (locality)

Government
  - State electorate: MacKillop
  - Federal division: Barker

Population
  - Total: 1,637 (UCL 2021)
- Time zone: UTC+9:30 (ACST)
  - Summer (DST): UTC+10:30 (ACDT)
- Postcode: 5275
- Mean max temp: 19.3 °C (66.7 °F)
- Mean min temp: 10.4 °C (50.7 °F)
- Annual rainfall: 494.1 mm (19.45 in)
Localities around Kingston SE
Lacepede Bay	West Range	Blackford
Lacepede Bay; Rosetown; Lacepede Bay	Kingston SE	Blackford; Reedy Creek
Lacepede Bay	Wyomi; Sandy Grove; Wangolina; Reedy Creek	Reedy Creek
- Locations; Adjoining Localities

Kingston SE (Kingston South East to distinguish it from Kingston on Murray), formerly Kingston, is a town in the Australian state of South Australia located in the state's south-east coastline on the shores of Lacepede Bay. It is located about 240 kilometres (150 miles) southeast of the state capital of Adelaide and 138 kilometres (86 miles) north-west of the centre of the city of Mount Gambier.

At the 2021 census, Kingston SE had a population of 1,637.

== History ==
Aboriginal Australian people lived in the area for tens of thousands of years before the colonisation of South Australia. The place, known to the Tanganekald and Meintangk peoples as Tangalun, was at the border of the traditional lands of these two peoples.

Kingston, South Australia was established in the 1800s by Archibald Cooke, his brother James Cooke, (Note: Not James Cook) and James' wife Mary Macpherson Cooke, and named Kingston in 1851.

Much later a Sir George Strickland Kingston, a South Australian politician, surveyor and architect was chosen, for the coincidence of his name, to open the Kingston Post Office on 9 February 1869. The extension on its name serves to distinguish Kingston in the South East (of South Australia) from another "Kingston" in the state which is now officially named "Kingston on Murray". The extension was added in July 1940.

The present-day town of Kingston SE includes the original Kingston, as well as the towns of Port Caroline and Maria Creek. The latter was so named after the Maria, which wrecked near Kingston in 1840. The 26 survivors were massacred by local Aboriginal people, after which a punitive expedition under Major O'Halloran hanged two Aboriginal people, and an unknown number of others were also killed, according to Aboriginal oral history.

The town was originally connected to the regional interior by the Kingston SE railway line, which opened as an isolated narrow-gauge route to Naracoorte in June 1876, providing a port for the grain and wool grown away from the coast. The rails were converted to broad gauge 1,600 mm with a new station built on the edge of town in 1959. The railway closed on 28 November 1987 and was dismantled on 15 September 1991.

== Media ==
The region used to be served by two newspapers: the Kingston Weekly, the newspaper of The Kingston Traders' Association, was issued between 22 March 1946 and 30 March 1951. Later, the South-East Kingston Leader was started in Kingston, and was published from 1962 until 21 November 2001 when it was renamed Coastal Leader. It is now owned by Australian Community Media.

== Today ==
At the 2021 census, Kingston SE had a population of 1,637.

The main industries are fishing, wine-making, sheep and cattle farming and recreation, the district having a large influx of tourists during holiday periods throughout the year.

The northern entrance to the town is dominated by the Big Lobster, named "Larry" by people in Kingston.

Kingston SE is home to the Cape Jaffa Lighthouse, which was moved to its current location from its former location on Margaret Brock Reef, and now operates as a museum. The museum also houses a lifeboat from MS Oliva which washed ashore after two years adrift.

The Catholic Church in the town is dedicated to Saint Therese.

The town has an Australian rules football team competing in the Kowree-Naracoorte-Tatiara Football League.

== Climate ==
Kingston SE has a warm-summer mediterranean climate (Köppen: Csb), with warm, dry summers and mild, drizzly winters. Average maxima vary from 24.8 °C (76.6 °F) in January to 14.1 °C (57.4 °F) in July and average minima fluctuate between 13.8 °C (56.8 °F) in January and 7.7 °C (45.9 °F) in July. Mean average annual precipitation is somewhat low: 494.1 mm (19.45 in), spread between 156.1 precipitation days. Extreme temperatures have ranged from 41.8 °C (107.2 °F) on 24 January 2021 to −0.7 °C (30.7 °F) on 15 June 2011. Climate data was taken from the nearest weather station at Cape Jaffa. The town features 41.6 clear days annually.

Climate data for Kingston SE (36º58'12"S, 139º43'12"E, 17 m AMSL) (1991-2020 normals and extremes)
Month	Jan	Feb	Mar	Apr	May	Jun	Jul	Aug	Sep	Oct	Nov	Dec	Year
Record high °C (°F)	41.8 (107.2)	40.8 (105.4)	38.4 (101.1)	33.1 (91.6)	27.2 (81.0)	22.4 (72.3)	19.5 (67.1)	23.3 (73.9)	27.6 (81.7)	34.0 (93.2)	38.4 (101.1)	40.3 (104.5)	41.8 (107.2)
Mean daily maximum °C (°F)	24.8 (76.6)	24.4 (75.9)	22.7 (72.9)	20.0 (68.0)	16.9 (62.4)	14.8 (58.6)	14.1 (57.4)	14.6 (58.3)	16.2 (61.2)	18.7 (65.7)	21.3 (70.3)	22.9 (73.2)	19.3 (66.7)
Mean daily minimum °C (°F)	13.8 (56.8)	13.6 (56.5)	12.6 (54.7)	10.8 (51.4)	9.4 (48.9)	8.0 (46.4)	7.7 (45.9)	7.9 (46.2)	8.6 (47.5)	9.3 (48.7)	10.7 (51.3)	12.3 (54.1)	10.4 (50.7)
Record low °C (°F)	6.5 (43.7)	6.3 (43.3)	5.2 (41.4)	1.3 (34.3)	0.0 (32.0)	−0.7 (30.7)	0.1 (32.2)	0.2 (32.4)	1.0 (33.8)	2.6 (36.7)	3.4 (38.1)	4.7 (40.5)	−0.7 (30.7)
Average precipitation mm (inches)	17.8 (0.70)	16.8 (0.66)	20.2 (0.80)	31.8 (1.25)	54.3 (2.14)	69.8 (2.75)	79.9 (3.15)	70.1 (2.76)	48.8 (1.92)	32.4 (1.28)	26.7 (1.05)	22.6 (0.89)	494.1 (19.45)
Average precipitation days (≥ 0.2 mm)	5.5	4.6	8.5	12.8	17.5	19.0	20.6	21.1	16.7	12.8	8.9	8.1	156.1
Average afternoon relative humidity (%)	55	57	58	62	71	76	77	74	72	63	58	55	65
Average dew point °C (°F)	11.7 (53.1)	12.2 (54.0)	11.3 (52.3)	10.3 (50.5)	10.2 (50.4)	9.2 (48.6)	9.0 (48.2)	8.6 (47.5)	9.4 (48.9)	9.1 (48.4)	10.1 (50.2)	10.5 (50.9)	10.1 (50.2)
Source: Bureau of Meteorology (1991-2024 normals and extremes)

== See also ==
- List of places called Kingston
