= Milang Railway Museum =

Museum in South Australia

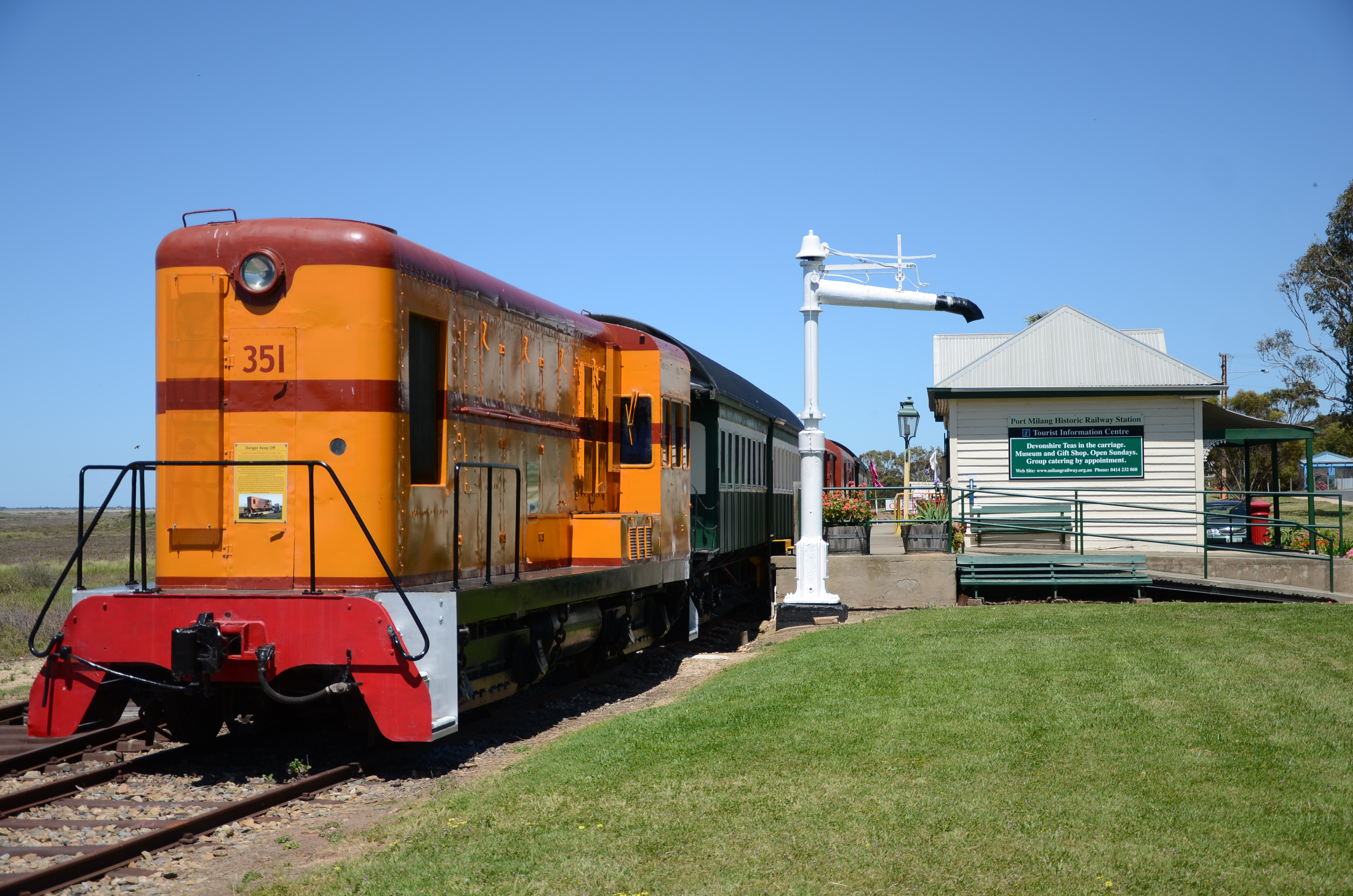
- A diesel locomotive on static display, together with a water column and rolling stock, at the Milang Historic Railway Station

- Location within South Australia
- Established: 1999
- Location: Milang, South Australia
- Coordinates: 35°24′31″S 138°58′18″E
- Type: Railway history
- Website: Official website

The Milang Railway Museum is a museum in the Australian state of South Australia located in the town of Milang in the former Milang railway station. It was established in 1999.

The volunteer-run site has two collections. One tells the story of the South Australian Railways with a focus on the Milang branch. The other, in the South Australian Light Railway Centre, holds examples of light railways locomotives and rolling stock. The museum, which as of 2026 is open at weekends from 12 noon to 4 pm (café carriage Sundays only), has many interactive displays, the most popular being the driving simulator in the cab of the full-size locomotive on static display at the station.
