= Nurragi railway station =

Former railway station in South Australia, Australia

Site of the former Nurragi railway station

General information
- Location: Australia
- Coordinates: 35.3713°S 138.9093°E
- Operator: Former South Australian Railways
- Line: Former Milang railway line

History
- Opened: 17 December 1884
- Closed: 17 June 1970
Location
- Location within South Australia

Nurragi was an unattended station at the farming locality of the same name in South Australia. It was located on the former 13.1 km (8.1 mi) long Milang railway line, which opened in 1884 and closed in 1970.

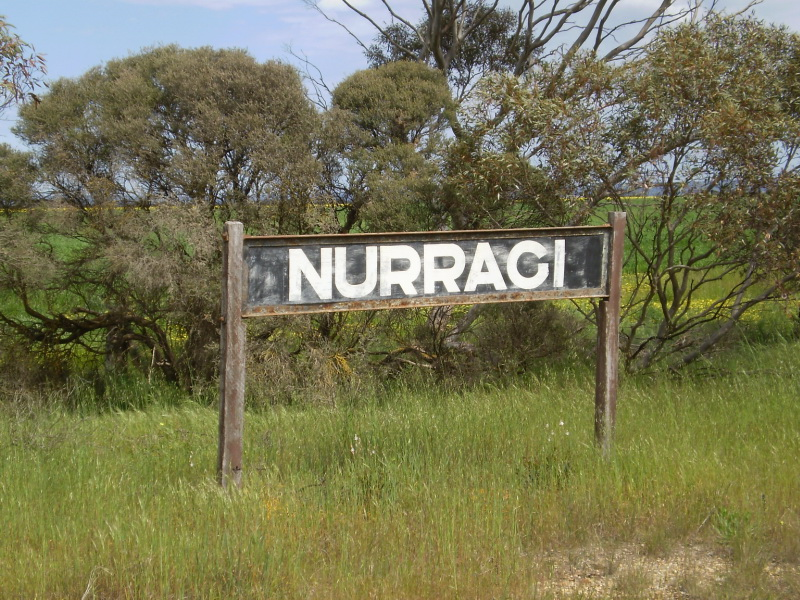
This sign, all that remains of the former station, is about half-way along what is now a popular walking trail

== History ==
The branch line left the former South Australian Railways Mount Barker–Victor Harbor railway line (now the SteamRanger Heritage Railway) at the farming locality of Sandergrove. It ended at Milang, on the shore of Lake Alexandrina. Nurragi, the only intermediate station on the line, was about halfway along the line.

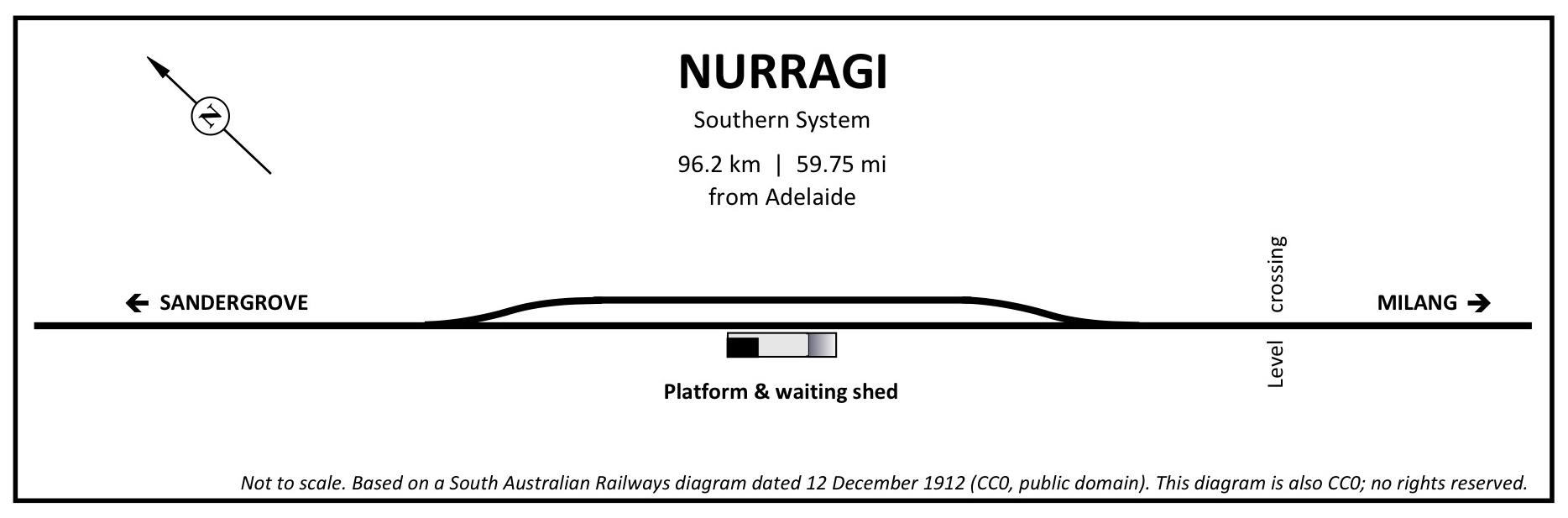
The layout of track at Nurragi (click to enlarge)

The limited facilities were a passing loop 70 metres (230 yards) long, a full-height platform, and a small shed for local farmers' consignments.

The name Nurragi is derived from the word for "scrub country" in the language of the local indigenous Ngarrindjeri people. It does indeed describe the original vegetation in the region before more than 98 per cent of it was cleared by European settlers.

After the Milang line was closed in 1970, the track was lifted and the site cleared. Since 1991, the site has been incorporated into the Nurragi Conservation Reserve, a popular rail trail. The reserve contains extremely important remnant vegetation indigenous to the Milang Scrub: more than 300 native plant species are present, of which more than 50 are of particular conservation significance. A community group has worked to re-establish flora; local primary school children have also taken part. Bare areas have been revegetated with species of the original Milang Scrub, including Aboriginal food plants such as muntries, quandongs and native currants. The reserve is also an important corridor for wildlife and birds between the lakeside environment and the foothills, providing them with food and protective cover.

Memorabilia and photographs of the station are displayed in the Milang railway museum.
