= Milang railway station =

Former railway station in South Australia, Australia

Milang
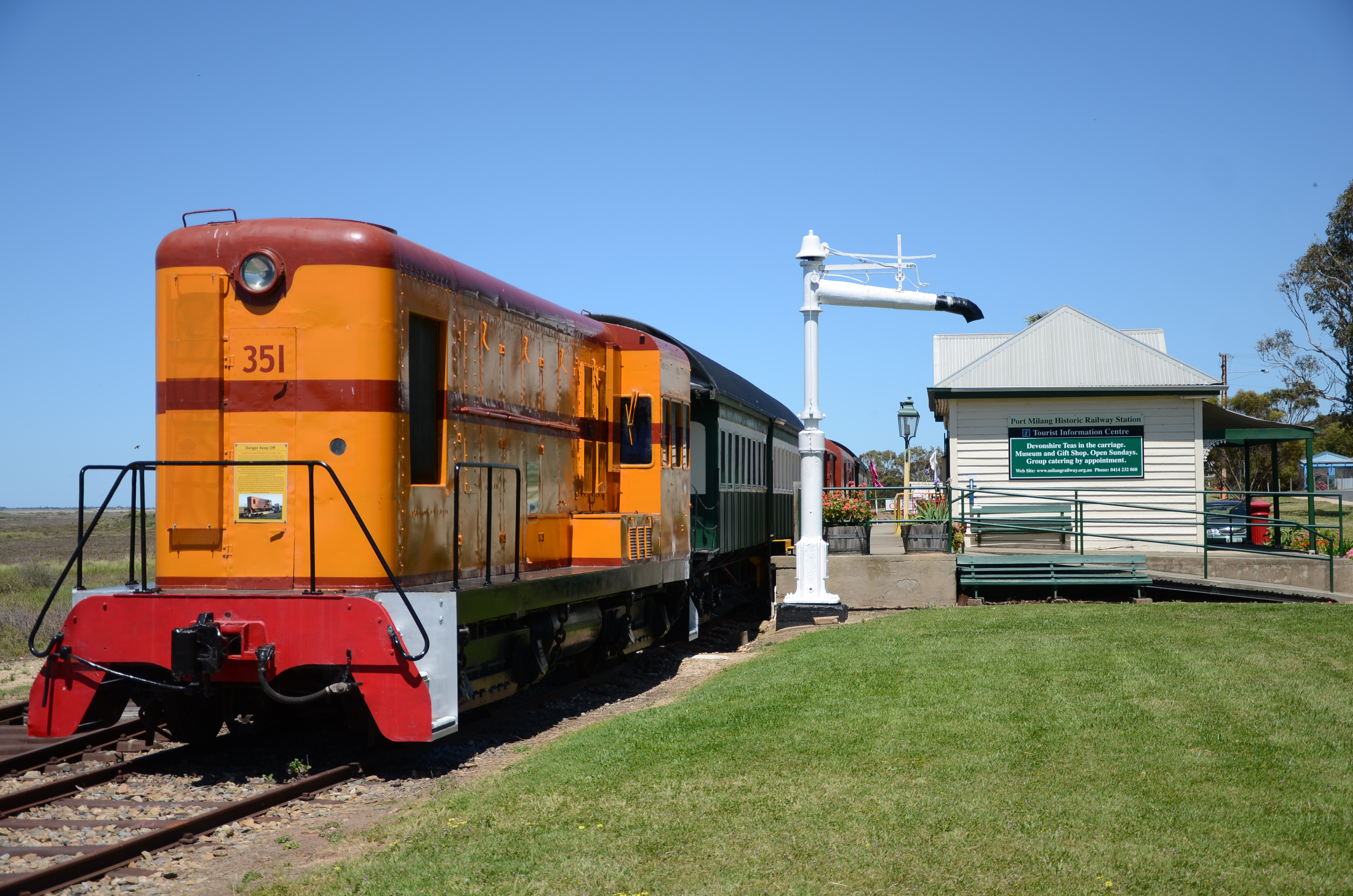
- A diesel locomotive on static display, together with a water column and rolling stock, at the Milang Historic Railway Station, South Australia

General information
- Location: Daranda Terrace, Milang, South Australia
- Coordinates: 35.40870125761997°S 138.9716926337806°E
- Operator: South Australian Railways
- Line: Milang line
- Distance: 75.8 kilometres from Adelaide
- Platforms: 1
- Tracks: 1

Construction
- Structure type: Ground

Other information
- Status: Closed, repurposed as a museum

History
- Opened: 17 December 1884
- Closed: 17 June 1970
Location

Milang railway station was the terminus of the Milang railway line in the South Australian town of Milang.

== History ==
=== Opening ===
Milang railway station opened on 17 December 1884 when a branch line off the main Victor Harbor railway line was built from Sandergrove to the port at Milang. The Milang terminus consisted of a main line, passing siding and stock siding; the goods siding was an extension of the main line. A 16.2 m (53 ft) human-propelled turntable was provided to turn locomotives and railcars. Narrow gauge (1,067 mm (3 ft 6.0 in)s) track was laid from its longstanding location at the jetty to the station, and all goods from river vessels – plus fish, since Milang was a flourishing fishing centre – were transferred on to broad-gauge vehicles at the wharf end of the station yard. A horse-drawn tramway transferred goods from the paddle steamers to the station yard. By the time the Milang line had been completed, the already built North West Bend railway to Morgan had made the Milang Port obsolete and the river trade began to dwindle. Closure of the line and station was recommended by the Transport Control Board to South Australian Railways but the recommendation was canceled onset of the prospect of heavy expenditure being needed to upgrade roads for heavy goods transport and by the expectation of impending increases in revenue following the severe drought of 1928–29 and an expected waning of the economic depression. Repeal of the 1930 Road and Railways Transport Act in 1964 exposed the railways to intense competition from road transport and reduced traffic severely.

=== Decline, closure and demolition ===
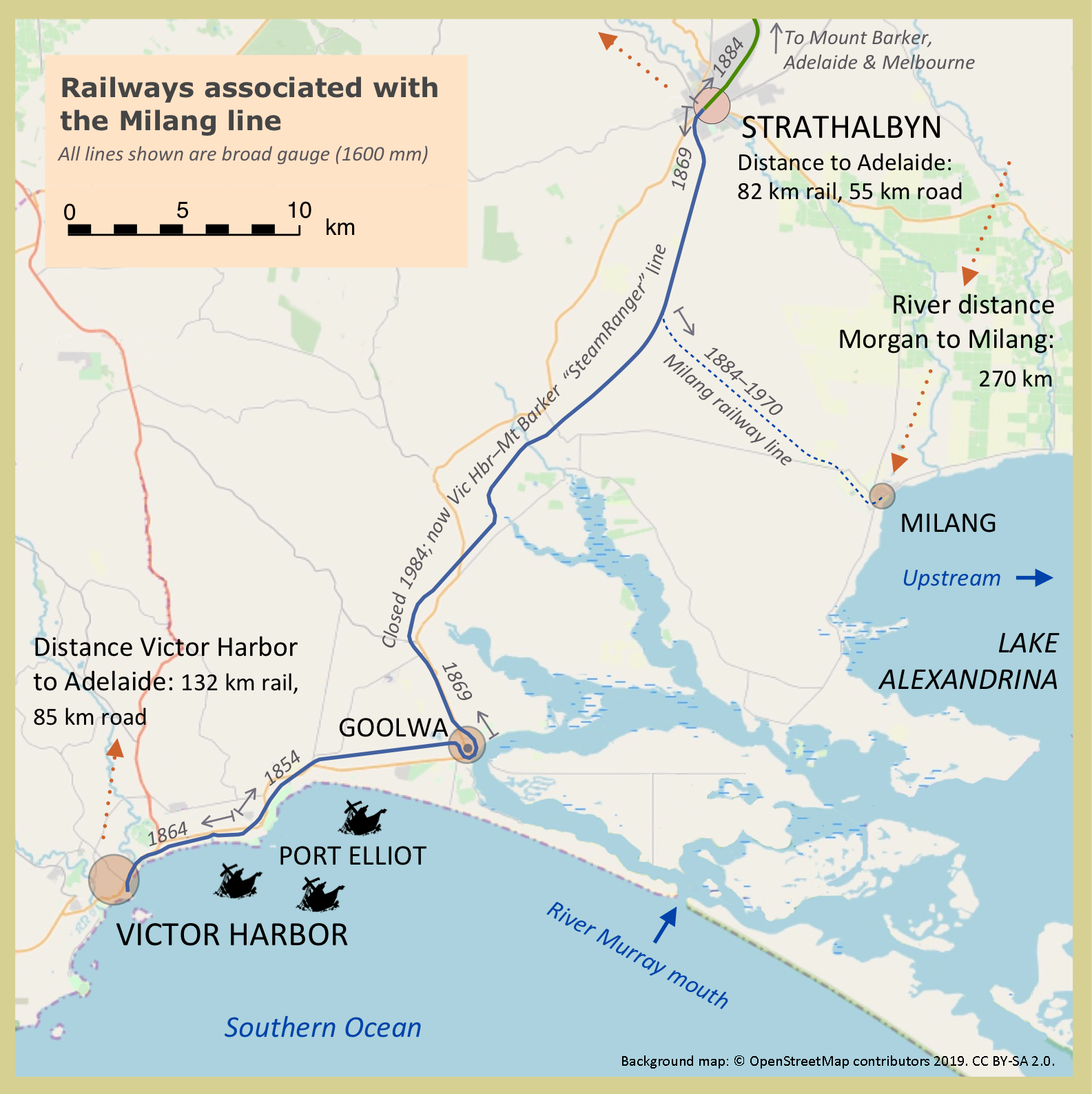
The railway lines associated with the Milang line

In 1969, a review by the Transport Control Board found that even on the Strathalbyn–Victor Harbor line, a total of only 4,500 passengers had boarded at stations during the previous year; closure of the lines south of Strathalbyn was recommended. The Parliamentary Standing Committee on Public Works then recommended an attempt be made to reinvigorate freight traffic rather than immediate closure of the main route, but recommended closure of the Milang branch. By then, although goods trains had operated occasionally, the last timetabled passenger service had run, on 30 November 1968. A special charter trip was operated on 15 June 1970, two days before the line was formally closed.

=== Rebuild and repurpose as a museum ===
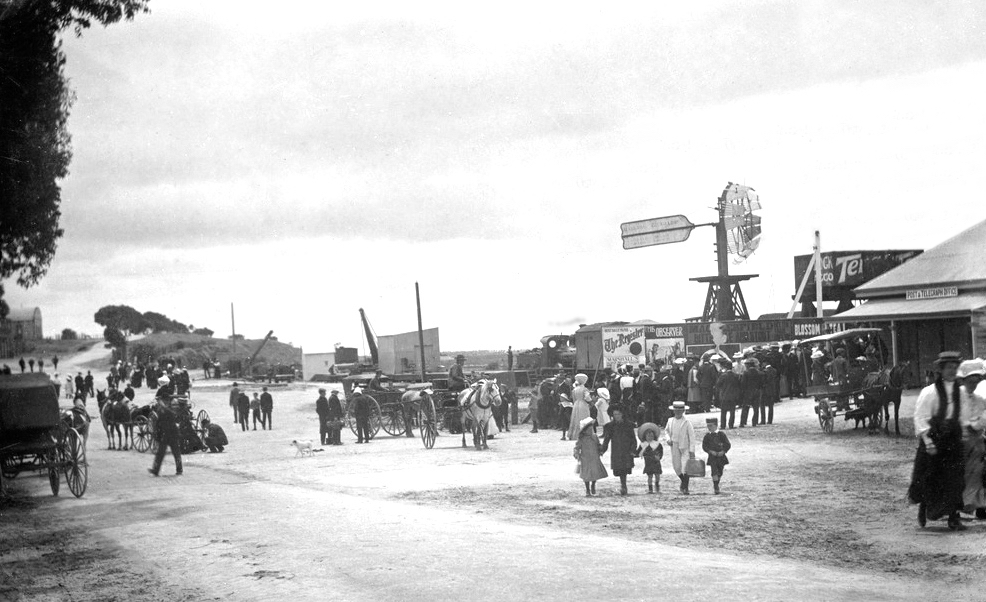
The busy precincts of Milang station, circa 1905, when the railway provided a mode of transport to the hinterland and state capital that, for the era, was fast, comfortable and convenient

The Milang Historical Railway Museum, which opened in 1992, has become one of Milang's major attractions. After the line was closed, the track and structures had been removed; the wooden station building was purchased and used for 20 years as an outbuilding on a farm. Subsequently, it was donated to the museum and members transported it back to its original site, to become the centrepiece of the museum on a new platform. All track and ballast had been removed, so museum members acquired and installed components that allowed them to replicate the previous track layout. Railway memorabilia and displays of the railway-era history of the town and surrounding districts are situated in the building and in several items of rolling stock next to the platform.

== Services ==
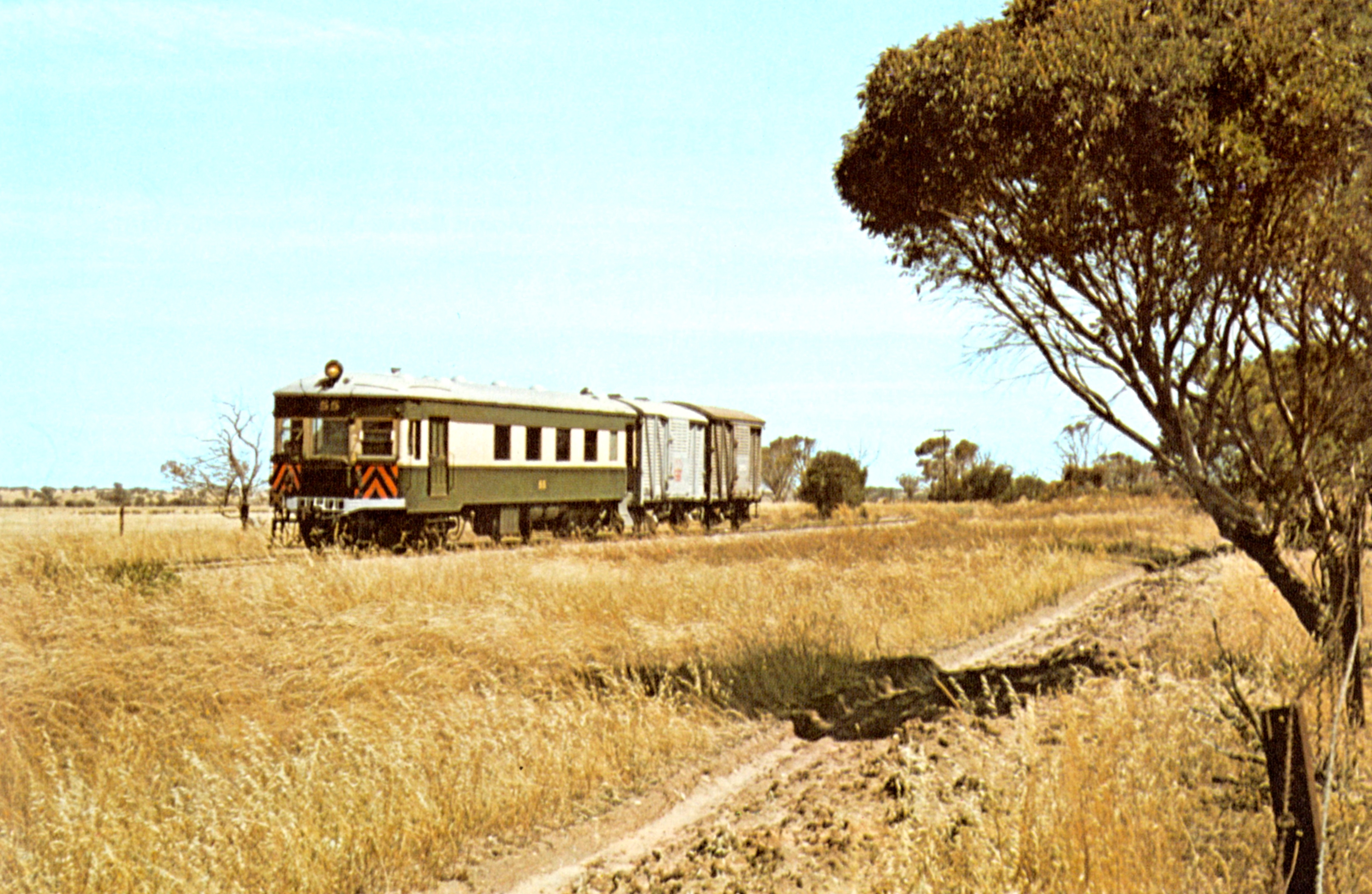
A familiar sight for many years: from 1942 until passenger services ended in 1968, most goods and livestock traffic was in one or two four-wheeled vehicles towed by a Model 75 railcar on the regular passenger schedule

Other than in the early years, safety in train operation was secured by the train order system. A mixed (freight and passenger) steam-hauled train provided the service from Strathalbyn until 1925, when new Brill Model 55 railcars commenced running daily between Adelaide and Milang. (Note: The schedule was: depart Adelaide 7.02 am, arrive Milang 10.50 am; depart Milang 3.20 pm, arrive Adelaide 6.48 pm.) A goods train worked several times a week from Strathalbyn. By the late 1930s, a larger Brill Model 75 railcar stationed at Strathalbyn worked all Milang services except for a weekly locomotive-hauled train. From 1942 to 1968, all goods and livestock traffic was in four-wheeled vehicles towed by the railcar. (Note: The load limit of these vehicles was 25 tons behind 55 class railcars and 50 tons behind 75 class railcars) In 1968 (the year the passenger service was halted), legislative protection of goods traffic on the South Australian Railways ceased and traffic plummeted on the line. Motive power for solely goods traffic was then provided on demand by mainline trains (Note: Hauled by 830 class locomotives.) doubling back from Sandergrove or Strathalbyn as necessary until the line was closed two years later.

== See also ==
- Milang railway line
- Milang railway museum
