= Nurragi, South Australia =

Nurragi
- Town
- Coordinates: 35°22′25″S 138°54′34″E
- Country: Australia
- State: South Australia
- LGA: Alexandrina Council
- Location: 13 km (8.1 mi) south of Strathalbyn
- Established: 1884

Government
  - State electorate: Hammond
  - Federal division: Mayo
- Elevation: 20 m (66 ft)

Population
  - Total: 30 (SAL 2021)
- Postcode: 5256
Localities around Nurragi
Sandergrove		Angas Plains
	Nurragi
Finniss		Milang

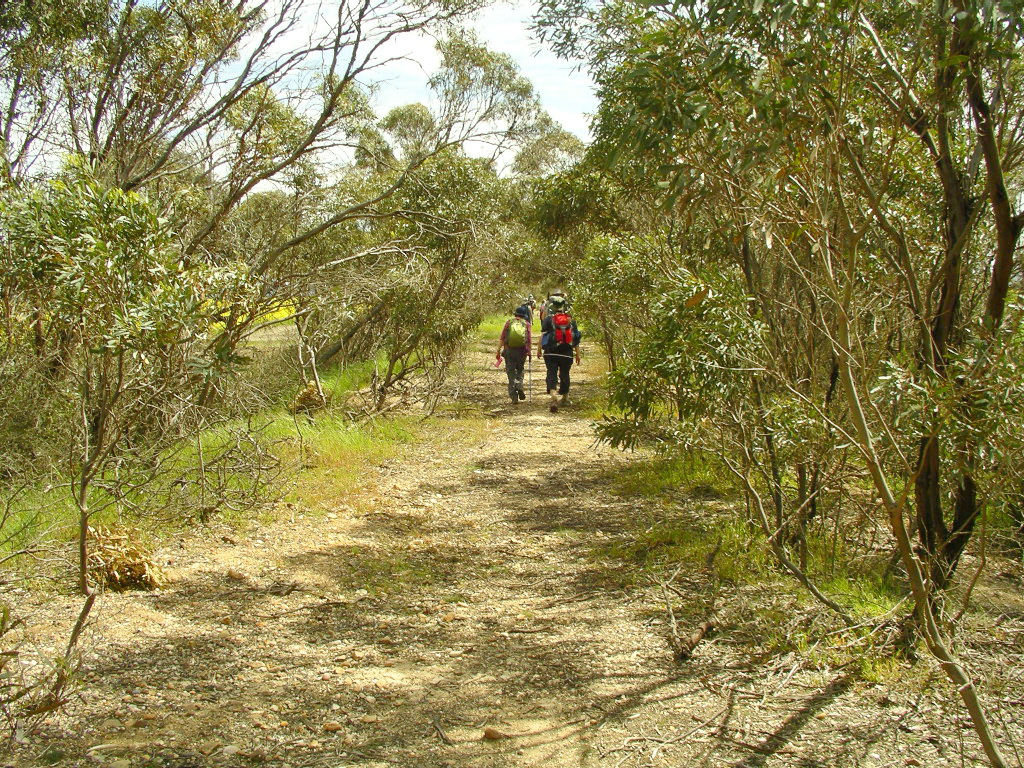
Hikers on the former Milang railway line (Nurragi Conservation Reserve), South Australia

Nurragi is a locality on Fleurieu Peninsula in South Australia. It was named for and served by the Nurragi railway station which in turn was derived from a native name for scrub. The station and railway alignment are now the Nurragi Conservation Reserve.
