= Poltalloch, South Australia =

Poltalloch South Australia
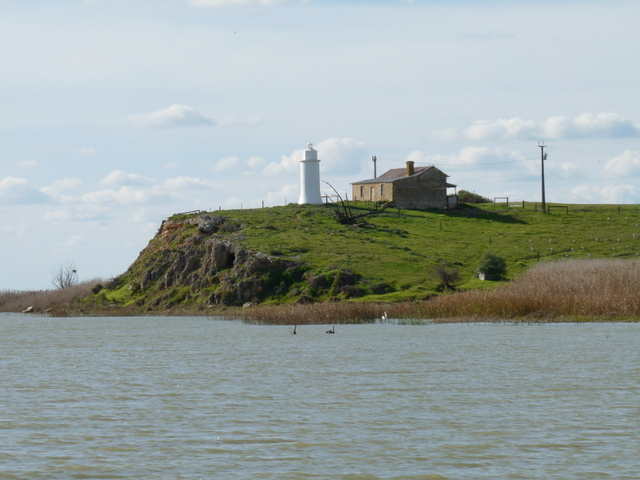
- Lighthouse on Point Malcolm at the south-west end of Poltalloch

- Coordinates: 35.527320°S 139.319360°E
- Population: 41 (SAL 2021)
- Established: 2002
- Postcode(s): 5259
- Time zone: ACST (UTC+9:30)
  - Summer (DST): ACST (UTC+10:30)
- Location: 87 km (54 mi) south-east of Adelaide
- LGA(s): Coorong District Council
- State electorate(s): Hammond
- Federal division(s): Barker
Mean max temp	Mean min temp	Annual rainfall
20.8 °C; 69 °F	10.3 °C; 51 °F	468.3 mm 18.4 in
Suburbs around Poltalloch:
Lake Alexandrina	Wellington East	Ashville
Lake Alexandrina; Lake Albert	Poltalloch	Ashville
Lake Albert	Lake Albert	Waltowa
- Footnotes: Distances; Coordinates; Climate; Adjoining localities

Poltalloch is a locality in the Australian state of South Australia located on land between the water bodies of Lake Alexandrina and Lake Albert about 87 kilometres (54 miles) south-east of the state capital of Adelaide.

Poltalloch began as a private sub-division in the cadastral unit of the Hundred of Malcolm. Its boundaries were created in August 2000 in respect to “the long established name.”

Poltalloch is bounded by Lake Alexandrina to the north, by Lake Albert to the south-west and by the Princes Highway to the south-east. A road named the Poltalloch Road runs between the Princes Highway in the north along the coastline with Lake Alexandrina to Point Malcolm in the south-west where a ferry service operates to provide access to Narrung. The principal land use within the locality is agriculture with a strip of land on the coastlines with both lakes being zoned for conservation purposes.

The locality includes the following places listed on the South Australian Heritage Register - Point Malcolm Lighthouse, Poltalloch Homestead and Poltalloch Station Complex.

Poltalloch is located within the federal division of Barker, the state electoral district of Hammond and the local government area of the Coorong District Council.
