= Narrung =

Narrung may refer to the following places in Australia:

- Narrung, South Australia, a town and locality
- Narrung, Victoria, a locality
- Narrung Peninsula, a peninsula in South Australia
