= Narrung Peninsula =

Nurrang Peninsula
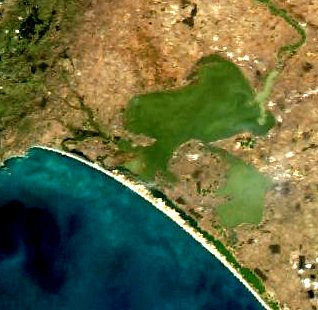
- Narrung Peninsula is located between Lake Alexandrina and Lake Albert

- Coordinates: 35°30′47″S 139°10′55″E
- Country: Australia
- State: South Australia

Nurrang Peninsula is a peninsula in the Australian state of South Australia located at the south east end of Lake Alexandrina. It is bounded by Lake Alexandrina to the west, by Lake Albert to the north and to the east, and by the Coorong to the south. While the name appears to have been in use since the 19th century and by all levels of government in South Australia, the name was not listed in the state government's official list of placenames until January 2020. Its extent is within the localities of Meningie West and Narrung.

== See also ==
- Loveday Bay (South Australia)
