= Loveday Bay (South Australia) =

- Location in South Australia
- Location: Lake Alexandrina, South Australia
- Coordinates: 35°35′06″S 139°05′22″E
- Type: Bay
- Primary inflows: Lake Alexandrina
- Basin countries: Australia

Loveday Bay is an inlet in the Australian state of South Australia located at the south-eastern end of Lake Alexandrina on the west coast of the Narrung Peninsula.

It is located within the locality of Narrung. The bay has a subsidiary inlet on its south coast which is known as Salt Lagoon which includes the protected area, the Salt Lagoon Islands Conservation Park.

It was named after early South Australian government surveyor Richard John Loveday. The indigenous name for the head of Loveday Bay was Ngiakkung. The southern end of the bay was traditionally used as a meeting place for intertribal trade.

A jetty was built in Loveday Bay in 1923 and was demolished in 1949.
