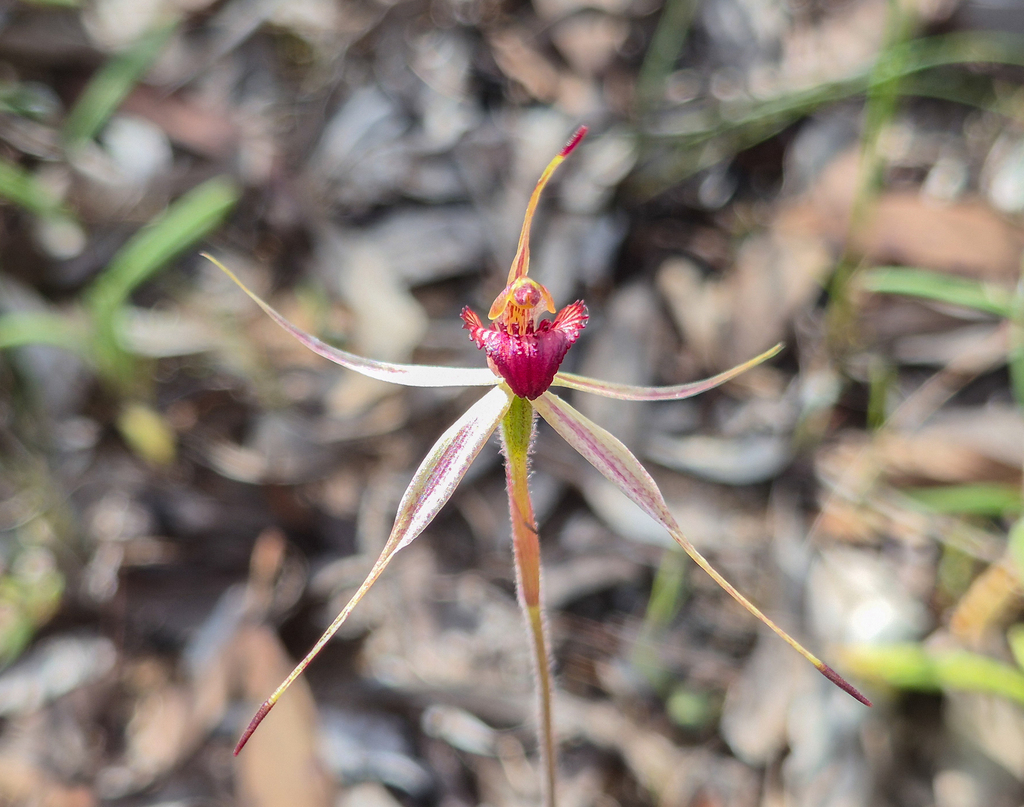
- Near Meningie West

Scientific classification
- Kingdom: Plantae
- Clade: Embryophytes
- Clade: Tracheophytes
- Clade: Spermatophytes
- Clade: Angiosperms
- Clade: Monocots
- Order: Asparagales
- Family: Orchidaceae
- Subfamily: Orchidoideae
- Tribe: Diurideae
- Genus: Caladenia
- Species: C. strigosa

Binomial name
- Caladenia strigosa (D.L.Jones) R.J.Bates

Synonyms
- Arachnorchis strigosa D.L.Jones

= Caladenia strigosa =

Species of orchid

Caladenia strigosa is a plant in the orchid family Orchidaceae and is endemic to South Australia. It is a ground orchid with a single leaf and a single greenish-cream flower with fine reddish streaks. It grows in sandy soil in shrubland.

== Description ==
Caladenia strigosa is a terrestrial, perennial, deciduous, herb with an underground tuber and a single, dull green, hairy, linear to lance-shaped leaf, 60–100 mm (2–4 in) long and 8–12 mm (0.3–0.5 in) wide with purple blotches near its base. The leaf and the flowering stem are densely covered with erect white hairs. A single greenish-cream flower with fine reddish streaks and 30–40 mm (1–2 in) wide is borne on a flowering stem 120–200 mm (5–8 in) tall. The dorsal sepal is 20–30 mm (0.8–1 in) long, about 2 mm (0.08 in) wide, oblong near the base then tapering to a thick glandular tip 3–5 mm (0.1–0.2 in) long. The lateral sepals are lance-shaped to egg-shaped near their bases, 25–30 mm (0.98–1.2 in) long, about 3 mm (0.1 in) wide and taper to narrow glandular tips 2–6 mm (0.08–0.2 in) long. The petals are 20–25 mm (0.8–1 in) long, about 2 mm (0.08 in) wide and taper to a thin, pointed tip. The labellum is egg-shaped, 11–13 mm (0.4–0.5 in) long, 7–8 mm (0.28–0.31 in)wide and has four to eight pairs of triangular, dark purplish-red teeth on the edges. The tip of the labellum curls downward and there are four rows of calli up to 1.5 mm (0.06 in) long along the mid-line of the labellum. Flowering occurs in September and October.

== Taxonomy and naming ==
Caladenia strigosa was first formally described in 2006 by David Jones who gave it the name Arachnorchis strigosa from a specimen collected near Ruakkan and the description was published in Australian Orchid Research. In 2008 Robert Bates changed the name to Caladenia strigosa and published the change in Journal of the Adelaide Botanic Garden. The specific epithet (strigosa) is a Latin word meaning "full of bristles" referring to the bristly hairs on the leaf and flowering stem.

== Distribution and habitat ==
This spider orchid grows in shrubland in sandy soil in the Coorong National Park.
