= Wellington East, South Australia =

Wellington East South Australia
- Coordinates: 35.325°S 139.397°E
- Population: 291 (SAL 2021)
- Location: 98 km (61 mi) southeast of Adelaide; 10 km (6 mi) southwest of Tailem Bend; 42 km (26 mi) north of Meningie
- LGA(s): Coorong District Council
- State electorate(s): Hammond
- Federal division(s): Barker
Localities around Wellington East:
	Jervois	Tailem Bend
Wellington	Wellington East	Cooke Plains
Lake Alexandrina	Poltalloch	Ashville

Wellington East (also historically known as East Wellington or part of Wellington) is a locality in the Murray Mallee on the east (left bank) of the Murray River in South Australia where the river opens into Lake Alexandrina, the largest of the lakes at the end of the Murray-Darling system.

Wellington East is the eastern end of the Wellington Ferry, the furthest downstream crossing of the Murray River on Route B45. It is mostly low-lying land and development is predominantly shacks and holiday homes associated with the river and lagoons. The eastern boundary is the Princes Highway between Tailem Bend and Meningie.
