= South Australian Railways 350 class =

Class of Australian diesel-electric locomotives

South Australian Railways 350 class locomotive
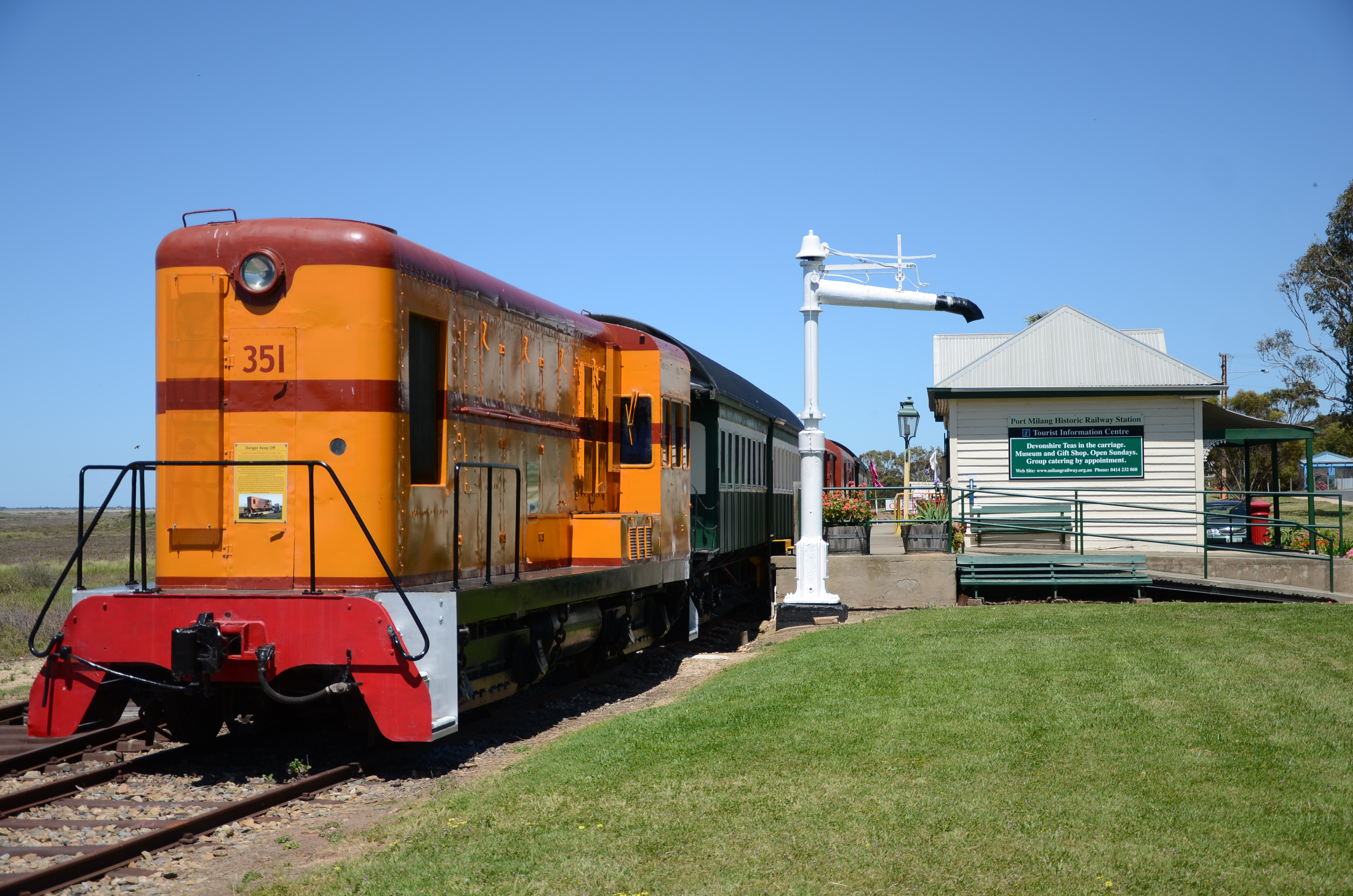
- Locomotive no. 351 is preserved as a static display at the Milang Historical Railway Museum, where visitors can "drive" it on a driving simulator using the full-size controls
Type and origin
- Power type: Diesel-electric
- Builder: Islington Railway Workshops
- Build date: 1949
- Total produced: 2
Specifications
- Configuration
  - UIC: Bo-Bo
- Gauge: 1,600 mm (5 ft 3 in)
- Wheel diameter: 3 ft (914 mm)
- Wheelbase: 26 ft (7.925 m) total, 7 ft (2.134 m) bogie
- Length: 35 ft (10.668 m) over headstocks
- Width: 9 ft 5 1/5 in (2.875 m)
- Height: 13 ft 3 3/8 in (4.048 m)
- Axle load: 12.3 long tons (12.5 t; 13.8 short tons)
- Loco weight: 49.5 long tons (50.3 t; 55.4 short tons)
- Fuel type: Diesel
- Fuel capacity: 300 imp gal (1,400 L; 360 US gal)
- Lubricant cap.: 65 imp gal (300 L; 78 US gal)
- Prime mover: English Electric 6KT
- Engine type: Four-stroke 6 in line diesel
- Aspiration: Natural
- Generator: EE506D
- Traction motors: Four
- Cylinders: 6 Inline
- Cylinder size: 10 in × 12 in (254 mm × 305 mm)
- Loco brake: Air
- Train brakes: Air
Performance figures
- Maximum speed: 17 miles per hour (27 km/h)
- Power output: 350 hp (260 kW) gross
- Tractive effort
  - Starting: 23,400 lbf (104.1 kN)
  - Continuous: 8,800 lbf (39.1 kN) at 8 mph (10 km/h)
Career
- Operators: South Australian Railways
- Number in class: 2
- Numbers: 350, 351
- First run: 7 June 1949
- Preserved: 350, 351
- Disposition: 2 preserved

The South Australian Railways 350 class comprised two diesel-electric locomotives built by the railway's Islington Railway Workshops, entering service in June 1949. They were the first diesel-electric locomotives built in Australia and the first to be operated by the South Australian Railways.

== History ==
Locomotives number 350 and 351 spent much of their service life working in their design role as shunting locomotives – in Adelaide yard, Islington Railway Workshops, Mile End goods yard and Mount Gambier station yard. In March 1978 they were included in the transfer of South Australian Railways assets to Australian National.

Both locomotives were withdrawn in 1979. Railway historical group SteamRanger bought 350 and still owns the locomotive, operating it as a depot shunter; its very low continuous tractive effort necessitates a 150-tonne load limit when it pulls a train on the Victor Harbor–Strathalbyn section of the railway.

A preservation group at Moonta bought 351 for a proposed heritage railway venture that did not come to fruition. Subsequently, the Australian Railway Historical Society (now SteamRanger) bought it and restored it to operating condition at its depot, then at Dry Creek, before deploying it to Goolwa for use on the Victor Harbor Tourist Railway. After mechanical problems occurred it was placed on permanent loan to the National Railway Museum at Port Adelaide, where it remained for 25 years. In 2015 it was gifted to the Milang Railway Museum. Following cosmetic restoration it is now a key element of the museum's outdoor static displays, especially since the installation of a locally developed driving simulator in the cab, which can be operated by visitors. (Note: The museum and the driving simulator are open on Saturdays and Sundays from noon to 4pm; entry to both is free. Children under 10 need adult assistance with the simulator because of the weight and age of the locomotive's controls.)
