= Salt Lagoon Islands Conservation Park =

Protected area in South Australia

- IUCN category Ia (strict nature reserve)
- Location within South Australia
- Location: South Australia
- Nearest city: Narrung
- Coordinates: 35°36′0″S 139°3′11″E
- Area: 76 ha (190 acres)
- Established: 16 March 1967
- Governing body: Department for Environment and Water

Salt Lagoon Islands Conservation Park is a protected area covering two islands and some adjoining waters in Salt Lagoon at the south east extent of Lake Alexandrina in South Australia about 14 kilometres (8.7 miles) south-west of Narrung.

It was declared for its significance as follows:

These two small islands are one of the main breeding sites for a number of the larger water birds in South Australia. Species known to breed there include two species of spoonbill, three species of egret, four species of cormorant, three species of ibis and the Nankeen night heron.

The conservation park is classified as an IUCN Category Ia protected area. In 1980, it was listed on the former Register of the National Estate.
