= Finniss, South Australia =

Finniss
- Town
- Coordinates: 35°23′07″S 138°49′22″E
- Country: Australia
- State: South Australia
- Region: Fleurieu and Kangaroo Island
- LGA(s): Alexandrina Council
- Location: 55 km (34 mi) SE of Adelaide; 13 km (8.1 mi) N of Goolwa
- Established: 1867 (town); 31 August 2000 (locality)

Government
  - State electorate(s): Finniss
  - Federal division(s): Mayo
- Elevation: 34 m (112 ft)

Population
  - Total(s): 293 (SAL 2016)
- Time zone: UTC+9:30 (ACST)
  - Summer (DST): UTC+10:30 (ACST)
- Postcode: 5255
- County: Hindmarsh
- Mean max temp: 21.7 °C (71.1 °F)
- Mean min temp: 10.3 °C (50.5 °F)
- Annual rainfall: 426.8 mm (16.80 in)
Localities around Finniss
Ashbourne; Mount Observation	Ashbourne; Sandergrove	Nurragi
Mount Observation; Tooperang	Finniss	Nurragi; Milang
Tooperang; Currency Creek	Currency Creek; Clayton Bay; Milang	Milang
- Locations; Adjoining localities

Finniss (formerly Queen's Own Town) is a settlement in South Australia. It is on the Victor Harbor railway line, a short distance north-east of where it crosses the Finniss River.

The town was originally surveyed with the name Queen's Own Town (after the Queens Own Regiment of Foot) in 1867 as the railway line was being extended from Goolwa to Strathalbyn. The name of the town was not changed to Finniss until 1940, although the adjacent railway station had already been named Finniss in honour of an early surveyor and the first Premier of South Australia, Colonel Boyle Travers Finniss.
