= Meningie West, South Australia =

Meningie West South Australia
- Coordinates: 35°39′50″S 139°10′44″E
- Population: 33 (SAL 2021)
- Established: 24 August 2000
- Postcode(s): 5264
- Time zone: ACST (UTC+9:30)
  - Summer (DST): ACST (UTC+10:30)
- Location: 99 km (62 mi) SE of Adelaide; 50 km (31 mi) SW of Tailem Bend
- LGA(s): Coorong District Council
- Region: Murray and Mallee
- County: Russell
- State electorate(s): MacKillop
- Federal division(s): Barker
| Mean max temp | Mean min temp | Annual rainfall |
| 20.8 °C; 69 °F | 10.3 °C; 51 °F | 469.2 mm 18.5 in |
Suburbs around Meningie West:
| Narrung | Narrung | Narrung; Lake Albert |
| Coorong | Meningie West | Lake Albert |
| Coorong | Coorong; Meningie | Lake Albert; Meningie |
- Footnotes: Location; Adjoining localities

Meningie West is a locality in the Australian state of South Australia located in the state’s south-east about 99 kilometres (62 mi) south-east of the state capital of Adelaide and about 50 kilometres (31 mi) south-west of the municipal seat in Tailem Bend.

Its boundaries were created on 24 August 2000.

Meningie West is located on an isthmus of land between the localities of Narrung in the west and Meningie in the east and bounded by the waters of Lake Albert to the north-east and by The Coorong to the south-west. A road passes through the locality from the settlement of Raukkan in Narrung on the shore of Lake Alexandrina to the town centre in Meningie.

The majority land use within Meningie West is for agricultural purposes, however the land within the locality’s centre and adjoining Lake Albert is zoned as ‘River Murray Fringe’ and ‘River Murray Flood Zone’ in order to protect both the natural environment and aspects of Aboriginal and European cultural heritage. Land on the coast with The Coorong is part of the Coorong National Park and is zoned for ‘conservation’.

Meningie West is located within the federal division of Barker, the state electoral district of MacKillop and the local government area of the Coorong District Council.
