= Ashville, South Australia =

Ashville South Australia
- Coordinates: 35.51°S 139.37°E
- Population: 28 (SAL 2021)
- Postcode(s): 5259
- Location: 32 km (20 mi) south of Tailem Bend; 127 km (79 mi) southeast of Adelaide
- State electorate(s): Hammond
- Federal division(s): Barker
Localities around Ashville:
	Wellington East	Cooke Plains
Poltalloch	Ashville	Malinong
	Waltowa	Meningie East

Ashville is a locality in South Australia along the Princes Highway between Tailem Bend and Meningie.

The locality is named after George Ash, who was a member of the South Australian Legislative Assembly in the 1890s and a business partner of Charles Cameron Kingston.

In 1913, the district population was 80 people.

A school at Ashville opened in 1895 and closed in 1959. A school hall built of stone opened in December 1918 to serve the purposes of "...the education of the children, a place of meeting and wholesome recreation for the young people, and a place of worship" at a cost of £600. It benefited the people of Ashville, Poltalloch and Albert Hill. The debt was still being paid off in 1920.

The Ashville Memorial Hall was "erected in memory of those who served". An appeal for funds following World War II included a gala country fair in 1949 at Poltalloch. The building now houses an art gallery and antique shop.
