= Point Sturt =

- Town
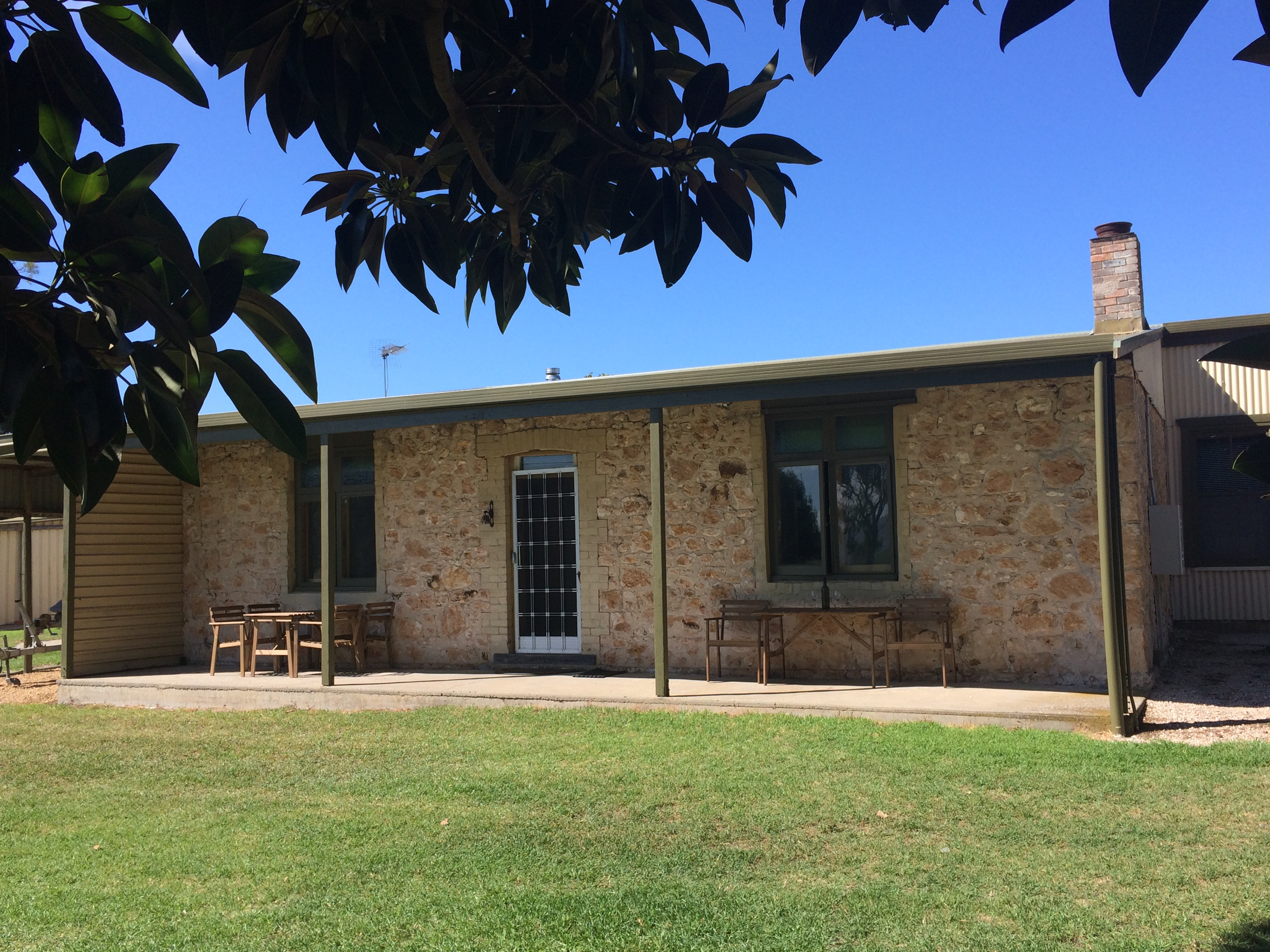
- Original stone settlers cottage at Nanda Farm, Point Sturt (c. 1855)

- Coordinates: 35°29′32″S 138°58′07″E
- Country: Australia
- State: South Australia
- Region: Fleurieu and Kangaroo Island
- LGA: Alexandrina Council
- Location: 71 km (44 mi) SE of Adelaide; 17 km (11 mi) E of Goolwa
- Established: 1850s (private sub-division); 31 August 2000 (locality)

Government
  - State electorate: Hammond
  - Federal division: Mayo

Population
  - Total: 69 (shared with part of Milang) (2016 census) (Note: For the 2016 census, the State Suburb of Point Sturt consisted of the locality of Point Sturt and the southern part of the locality of Milang south of Landseer Road.)
- Time zone: UTC+9:30 (ACST)
  - Summer (DST): UTC+10:30 (ACDT)
- Postcode: 5256
- County: Hindmarsh
Localities around Point Sturt
Milang	Lake Alexandrina	Lake Alexandrina
Clayton Bay	Point Sturt	Lake Alexandrina
Clayton Bay	Hindmarsh Island; Mundoo Island	Lake Alexandrina
- Locations; Adjoining localities

Point Sturt is a locality in the Australian state of South Australia located on the Sturt Peninsula on the west side of Lake Alexandrina about 71 kilometres (44 mi) south-east of the state capital of Adelaide and about 17 kilometres (11 mi) east of the municipal seat of Goolwa.

It is made up of rural living land holdings, primary production and grazing land. The beginning of Point Sturt Road is about 4 km from Clayton Bay and 9 km south of Milang, South Australia. At the end of Point Sturt road there are views across Lake Alexandrina to Raukkan.

== History ==
=== Traditional Owners ===
The area was originally inhabited by the Ngarrindjeri Nation which consisted of 18 Lakinyeri (clans). Although the population of the Ngarrindjeri Nation is unknown, it is believed to have been substantial, as the lake and surrounds provided plenty of food and water. The Ngarrindjeri name for the end of Sturt Peninsula was "Tipping", which meant "the lips". Contact with Europeans and subsequent exposure to various diseases in the early 1800s had a devastating effect on the Ngarrindjeri population, and many people died. Many others were displaced or forcibly removed to Raukkan as Europeans took over the land for farming.

The native title rights and interests of the Ngarrindjeri people were recognised in Ngarrindjeri and Others Native Title Claim on 14 December 2017. The determination granted the Ngarrindjeri people rights including the right to access and move around the Native Title Land, hunt, fish and gather, share and exchange, use Natural Water Resources, cook and light fires for ceremonial purposes, engage in cultural activities and protect cultural sites. All waterways and possibly land parcels are within the Native Title legislation with developments requiring approval through the Registered Native Title Body Corporate.

=== European settlement ===
The Sturt Peninsula was discovered in December 1837 by a team of European explorers led by Thomas Bewes Strangways and Young Bingham Hutchinson who travelled by water from Currency Creek to Lake Alexandrina to ascertain its extent and outflows. Point Sturt was the name they gave to their landing place at the end of the Peninsula.

By the early 1850s the land on the Sturt Peninsula was divided into sections and sold to settlers.

Early European settlers include dairy cattle breeder John H. Yelland, sheepfarmers George and William Pearce and Thomas Oakley, and pastoralist and politician John Howard Angas. In 1855 Thomas Oakley purchased a 96-acre parcel of land at Section 13 for 96 Pounds Sterling. This property was called Nanda Farm. On the day of Thomas' death, 1 December 1880, he transferred the property to his young grandson James Albert Oakley. James owned Nanda Farm until his death in 1951 when the property then transferred to James' nephews, Albert Charles (Charlie) Oakley and Stanley Thomas Oakley. The property finally left the Oakley family after 112 years, when it was sold in 1967.

Most of the native vegetation including dense woodlands of Mallee, pink gum, she-oak and native pines were harvested for fuel for paddle steamers. The peninsula comprises a sand dune capped with secondary limestone, which provided many challenges to farmers trying to plough their fields. However, the stones were a very useful resource for building houses and fences. Many of the original buildings and stone fences are still standing and are a distinctive feature of what is now Point Sturt. A good example of this architectural element can be seen today in its original form at Nanda Farm (see photo).

== Establishment of the locality ==
Boundaries were created on 31 August 2000 for the locality which was given the " long established local name" which is derived from the point at the east end of the Sturt Peninsula.

== Natural history ==
=== Fauna ===
Point Sturt is home to the eastern grey kangaroo and echidna. A bird-lover's paradise, the lake is home to many varieties of abundant bird life and is a natural habitat and breeding ground for the Australian pelican, black swan, kite, Cape Barren goose, Black-Tailed Native Hen (Tribonyx ventralis), various duck species including Australian wood duck, galah, ibis and many other birds at different seasonal times of the year. Reptiles include eastern long-necked turtle and Murray short-neck turtle, blue-tongued skink, shingleback lizard, eastern brown, red-bellied black and tiger snake.

== Current use ==
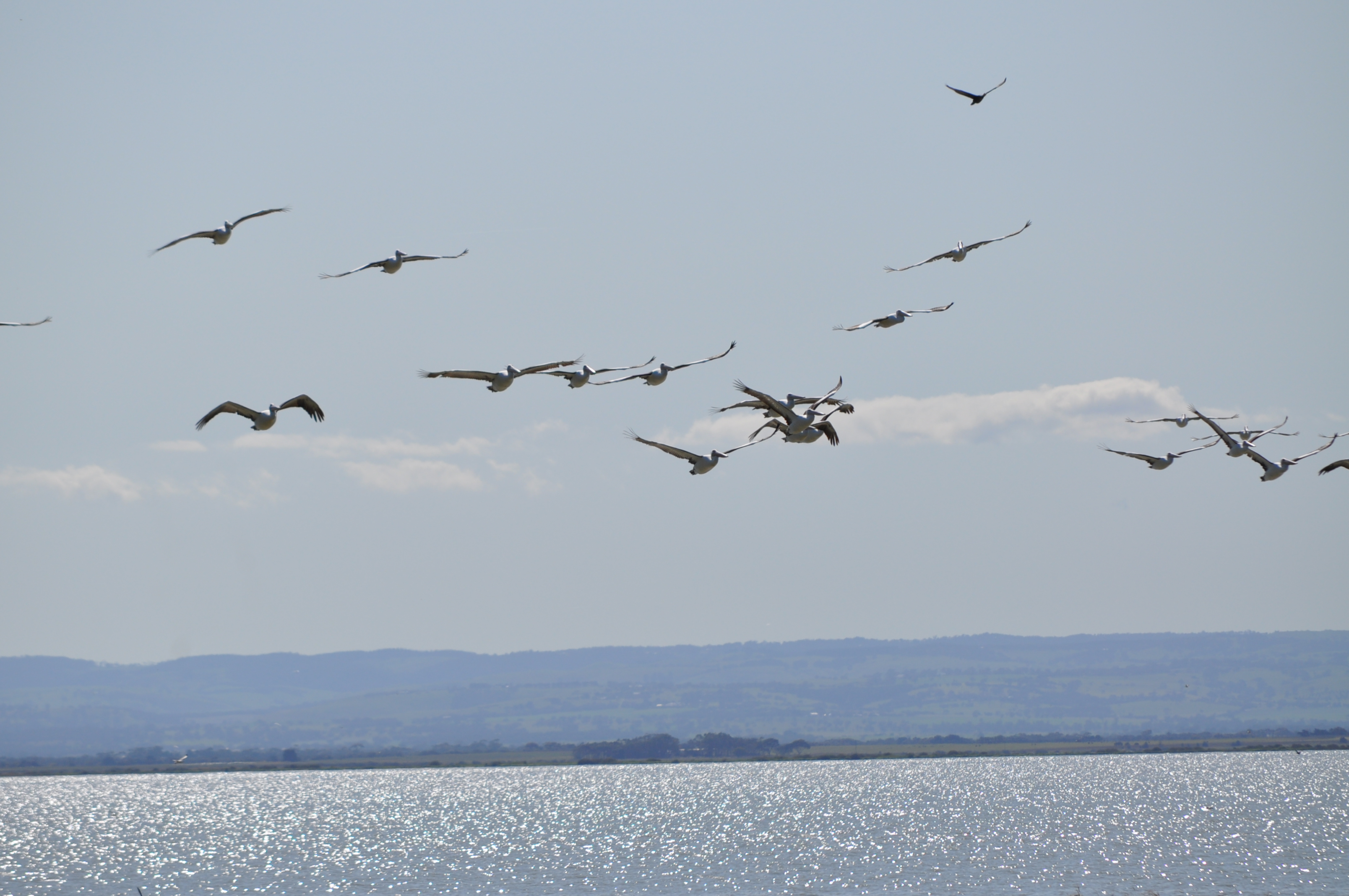
Pelicans flying over the Lake Alexandrina.

- Most of the land at Point Sturt is used for cattle and sheep grazing.
- Part of Point Sturt is a designated conservation area and the area is designated as a Ramsar site of international significance.
- Lake activities – sailing, kayaking, windsurfing, fishing and swimming.
- On the Australia Day long weekend the Milang-Goolwa Freshwater Classic yacht race sails around Point Sturt.
- Westminster School owns a 68 hectare outdoor education site at Point Sturt, conducting a 2-week program at the site for Year 10 students each year.
- Over recent years, revegetation of various land holdings has been undertaken by Point Sturt and Districts Landcare Group.

== Governance ==
Point Sturt is located within the federal division of Mayo, the state electoral district of Hammond and the local government area of the Alexandrina Council.
