= Milang railway line =

Former railway line in South Australia

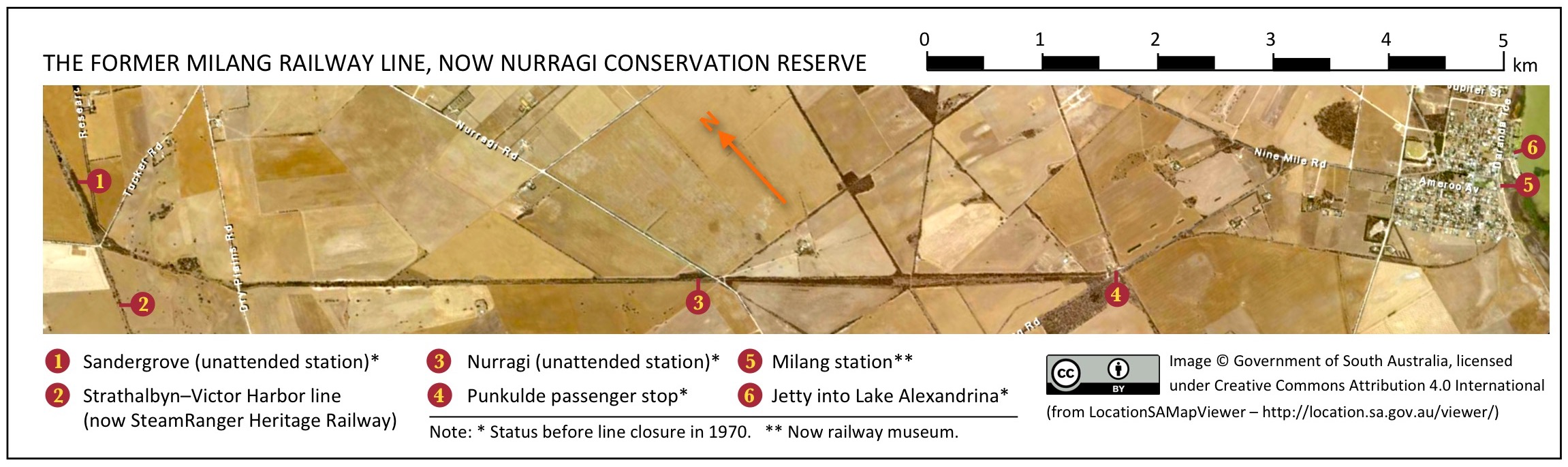
- The former Milang railway line, now a popular rail trail (click to enlarge)

Overview
- Status: Closed, infrastructure removed
- Termini: Sandergrove (farming locality) at 35°20′01″S 138°52′19″E; Milang (railway museum at former railway station) at 35°24′33″S 138°58′18″E
- Continues from: Strathalbyn to Victor Harbor railway line
- Stations: Nurragi (unattended station) at 35°22′17″S 138°54′33″E and Punkulde (stopping place) at 35°20′22″S 138°56′17″E

Service
- Operator(s): South Australian Railways

Milang railway line rail trail
- Location: Between Sandergrove and Milang
- Established: 1991
- Designation: Nurragi conservation reserve
- Use: Hiking (easy topography; fences are crossed using stiles)
- Sights: Wildflowers, plants and wildlife
- Surface: Natural; compacted gravel
- Right of way: Former Milang railway line

History
- Opened: 17 December 1884
- Closed: 17 June 1970

Technical
- Line length: 13.1 km (8.1 mi)
- Track gauge: 1600 mm (5 ft 3 in)

The Milang railway line was a branch line, now closed, of the former South Australian Railways that left the mainline to Victor Harbor at the farming locality of Sandergrove, 9 km (5.6 mi) south of Strathalbyn and 89.7 km (55.7 mi) by rail from Adelaide. From there it proceeded in a south-easterly direction for 13.1 km (8.1 mi) to the riverport of Milang on Lake Alexandrina, in the estuary of the River Murray. The line was opened on 17 December 1884; it was formally closed on 17 June 1970. The route is now a "rail trail" that is popular with hikers. The precincts of the former Milang station house a railway museum that includes an innovative locomotive driving simulator for visitors to operate. Onsite is a centre for South Australian historical light railways.

== The new river trade ==
During the latter half of the 19th century, many moves and counter-moves, in trade and politics, were prompted by inter-colonial rivalry and fierce competition. Boat-borne trade on the Murray–Darling river system, which started in 1853, was no exception. The creation of the Milang railway line only occurred after a third of a century of such contention – and it was parliamentary influence of the man who founded Milang, rather than economics, that brought it into being.

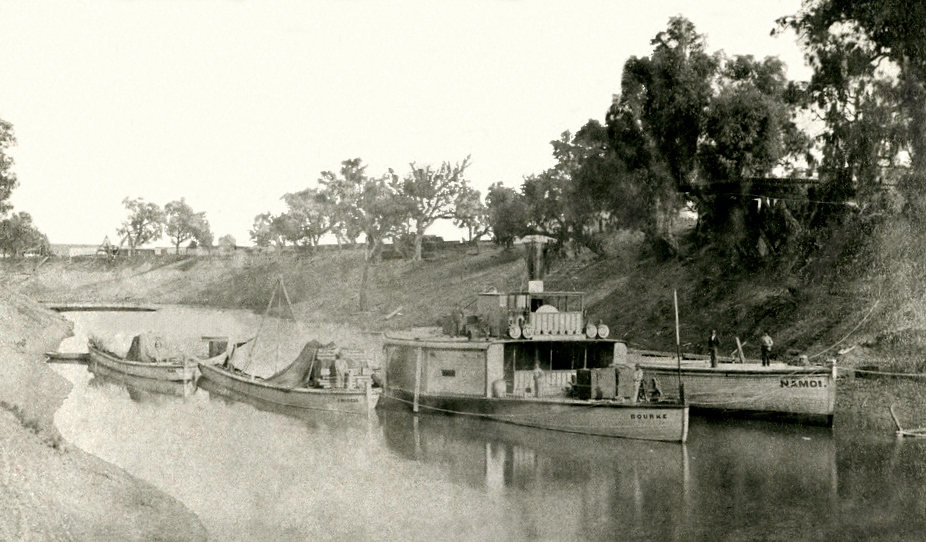
Bourke, on the Darling River about 1880, was one of the paddle steamers owned by Albert Landseer, the man who founded Milang in 1853 and in 1884 brought the railway to the town to ship his cargo

Two driving forces in the river trade were the need to reduce the cost of transporting heavy produce, especially wool, to seaports and to maximise state governments' customs revenue. (Note: Until Federation brought the Australian states together in 1901, they levied customs duties at their borders. In 1853, William Randell, the first steam navigator of the rivers in the PS Mary Ann, built at Mannum, had to steam 100 miles downstream to Goolwa to get customs clearance for the first cargo borne on the Murray.) State governments, pastoralists, businessmen and boat owners were quick to seize any competitive advantage.

Before the arrival of the river boats, of which there would be more than 100, goods and produce were moved by rough tracks using bullocks or horses and wagons – a slow and arduous process. River travel along the Murray and Darling (Note: The length of the River Murray is about 2508 km; its tributary, the Darling River, is about 1545 km from its junction with the Murray to the Culgoa River; and the main tributaries of the Darling (the Condamine, Balonne and Culgoa rivers) are about 1195 km long.) allowed traders to transport perishable goods to pastoralists on inland properties. In turn, pastoralists could ship their valuable wool clips much faster to ocean ports for export to the mills of Britain.

== A railway to the wrong place ==
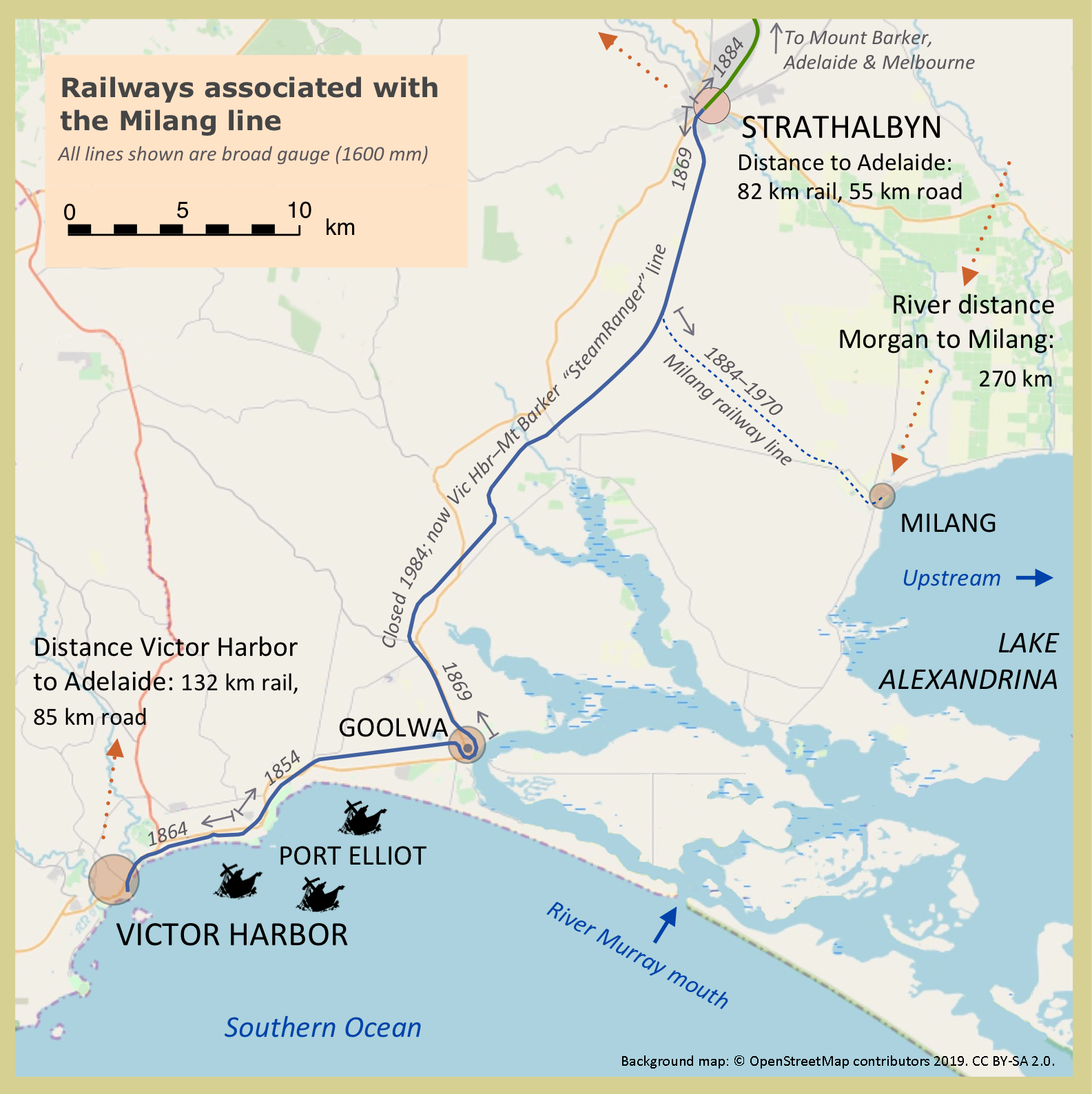
The railway lines associated with the Milang line

In 1853, after the navigability of the river 2400 km (1500 mi) upstream to its junction with the Darling River had been proved, the estuarine town of Goolwa monopolised South Australia's river trade with Victoria and New South Wales, and the town was to enjoy this primacy for 25 years.

The destination for agricultural produce (mainly wool) carried down the river was Port Adelaide, before shipping to Britain. In the absence of railway transport in South Australia, boats had to risk the hazards of sandbars and currents at the river mouth and the Southern Ocean shores. To bypass them, an 11.2 km (7.0 mi) railway line – the first full-scale railway in Australia – was built from Goolwa to Port Elliot, where ocean-going vessels docked. The line opened in 1854. (Note: The Goolwa to Port Elliot line was Australia's first full-scale railway. Although it and two contiguous lines built later had horses as motive power until 1884 (an economy measure), the route alignment and other civil engineering was built for working by locomotives.)

Timeline – the Milang line in context
Prompted by	Opening of	Date	Length	Traction
Access to ocean-going and coastal vessels	Goolwa–Port Elliot line	1854	11.2 km (7.0 mi)	Horse until 1869
Hazards of Port Elliot waters	Westward extension, Port Elliot to Port Victor	1864	6.4 km (4.0 mi)	Horse until 1869
Pressure from hinterland for access to seaport	Eastward extension, Goolwa to Strathalbyn	1869	33.0 km (20.5 mi)	Steam
Market advantage of rail connection to Adelaide (and in 1887 to Melbourne)	Link to Adelaide: Strathalbyn to Mount Barker	1884	26.5 km (16.5 mi)	Steam
Albert Landseer's advocacy	Branch line to Milang	1884	13.1 km (8.1 mi)	Steam
* Sources: Kemp (1991), Bird (1970), South Australian Railways (1942).

The grave mistake in choosing Port Elliot as a harbour soon became apparent: by 1864, seven ships at anchor had been wrecked. Port Victor, later named Victor Harbor, 4 miles (6.4 km) to the west, was a much safer seaport. In that year, therefore, a jetty and pier were built at Port Victor and the railway line was extended west to the town to reach them. At the same time, the people of Strathalbyn and surrounding areas successfully applied political pressure to build a line connecting their town to the eastern end of the railway. The line was completed in 1869.

== Railways draw off the river trade ==
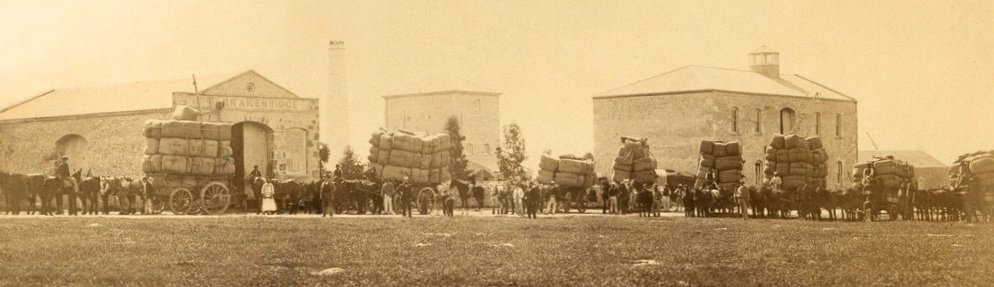
A decade before the railway arrived, horse teams and wool wagons assemble at Milang's wool stores for the 100 km journey to Port Adelaide and export to Britain

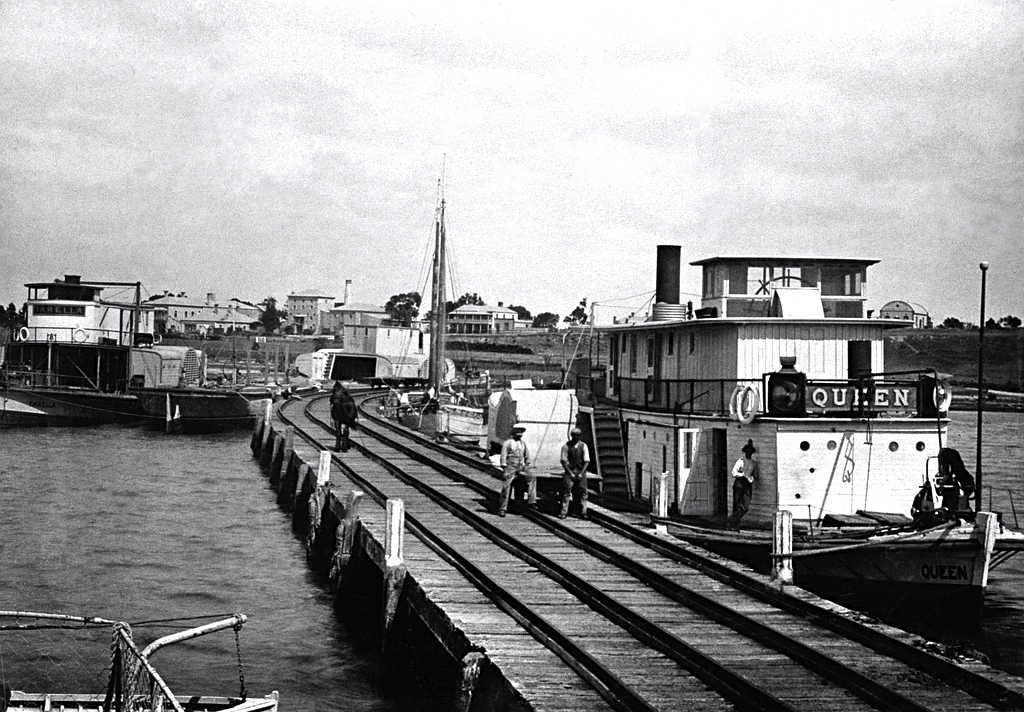
Cargo from these boats at the jetty, circa 1900, is transhipped on to the Milang line, from where it is usually conveyed to Port Adelaide, thence to Britain.

By the end of the 1870s, in the same way that river boats had revolutionised the transport of produce, steam trains rapidly cut into their market. Produce brought from the upper reaches by boat could be hastened to Port Adelaide by rail without needing to continue on the river to the lower reaches. The opening of one railway in particular had a huge impact on lower River Murray ports: the line to Morgan, which was extended from Kapunda in 1878, provided a connection with the state capital. Since Morgan was 306 km (190 mi) and up to a week's journey by river from Goolwa, but only 160 km (99 mi) of faster transit by rail to Adelaide, the town almost immediately eclipsed Goolwa as the busiest riverport in South Australia. The smaller settlement of Wellington, 63 km (39 mi) upstream from Goolwa, was similarly overtaken when a railway from Adelaide arrived at nearby Murray Bridge the following year.

Throughout this period of change, primary producers in the Murray mouth region were disadvantaged by the comparatively higher costs of either transporting produce overland to Adelaide by dray or by coastal shipping, since the Port Victor line had not been extended further north than Strathalbyn. Eventually the South Australian parliament appointed a select committee to investigate building a connecting line of about 30 km (19 mi) from Strathalbyn to the Adelaide–Melbourne line then under construction.

== Political push for Milang (and Mr Landseer) ==
One of the select committee members was a Member of Parliament, Albert Landseer. In 1856 he had founded Milang, where he continued to have his headquarters. His business interests in the area – included flour milling and ownership of river steamers and barges. Agent for the paddle steamer pioneer Francis Cadell, and wool warehousing – were immense. He was also the senior representative for Mount Barker since 1875. (Note: Milang was then on the Adelaide–Melbourne mail route: goods, passengers and mail etc. were brought over the hills by road then loaded into paddle steamers for the journey across Lake Alexandrina to Meningie, continuing by road. During his 1859 survey, Chas. Hargrave pointed out that by using Milang as a railhead, any sea-bound goods would need to be transferred to the railway at Goolwa only to be loaded back into ships again at Port Victor. The only advantage was avoidance of the sandbars. It still made more sense to take any line south from Strathalbyn to Goolwa or Port Victor.)

So it was that in November 1881, when assent was granted to an Act – short title The Mount Barker and Strathalbyn Railway Act – it authorised not only a link to Mount Barker but the branch line from Sandergrove to Milang that Landseer had been seeking. When the line was opened, a newspaper report started with a remark that the branch was "jocularly styled 'Landseer's line'".

The "palmy days" of river trade were over, however, by the mid-1880s. Morgan's primacy over the downstream ports – after the completion of its rail link with Adelaide – was well established and the trade itself was on the eve of decline.

== The line is built ==
Station track layouts

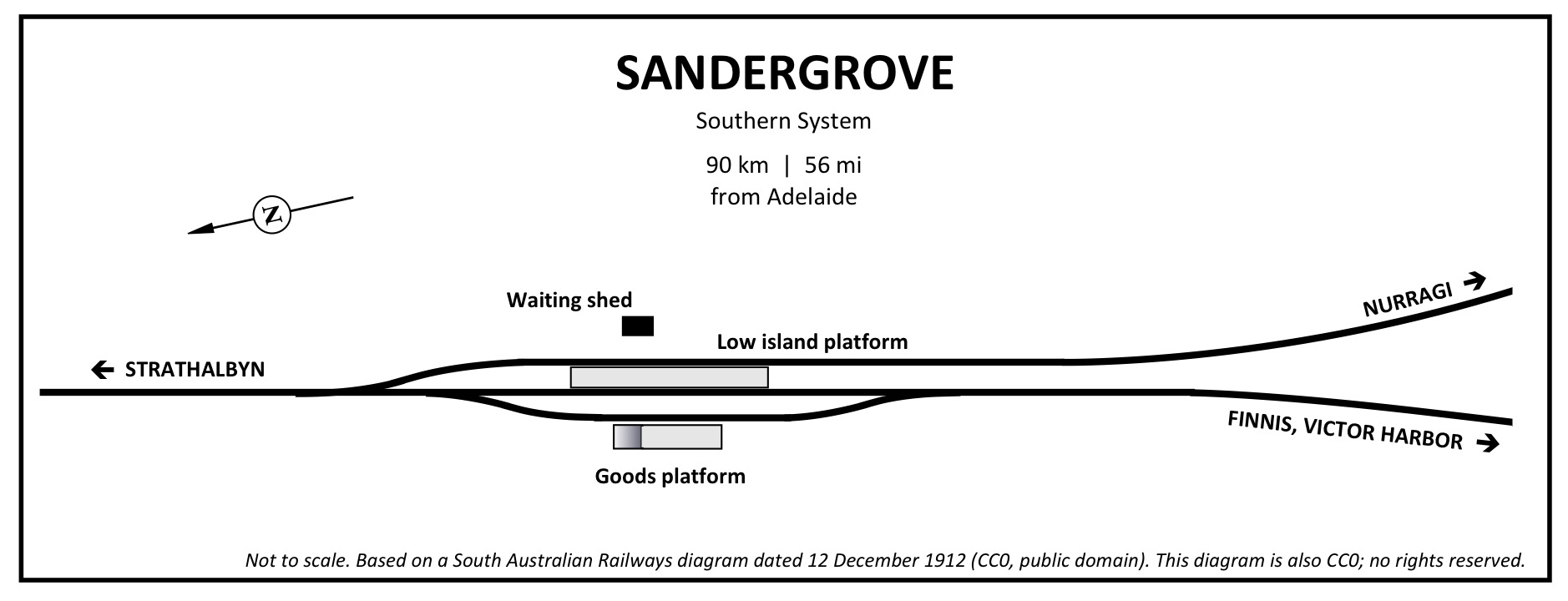
Track configuration at Sandergrove junction, where the Milang branch left the Port Victor line, in 1912

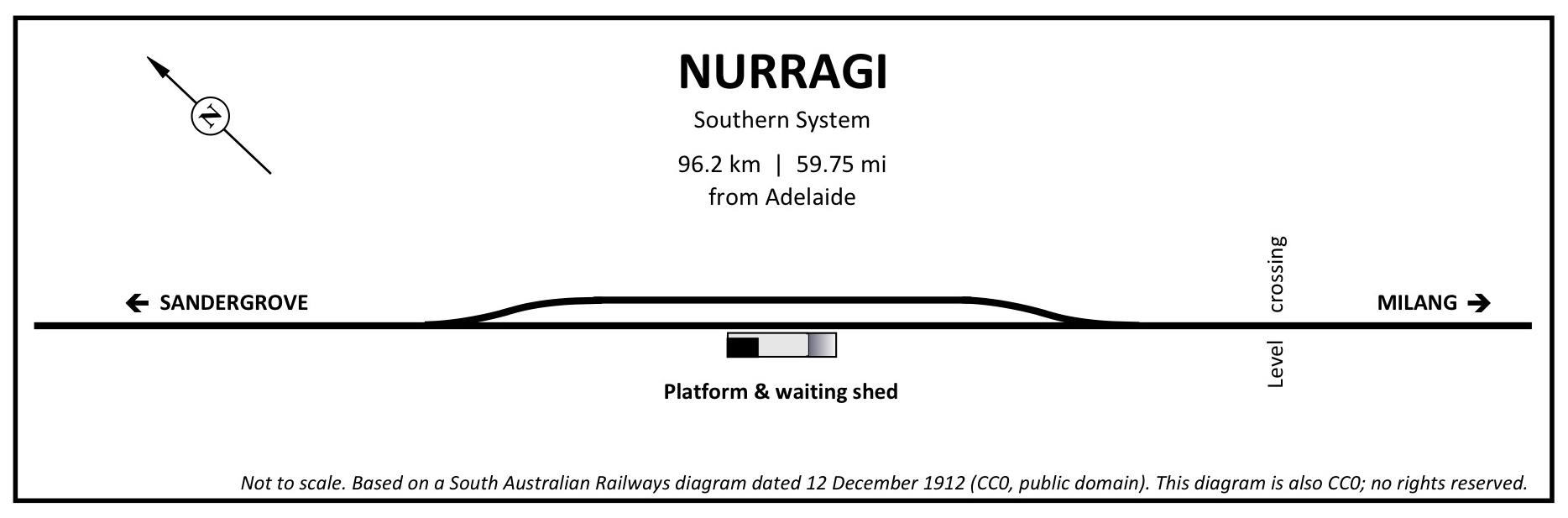
Track configuration at Nurragi in 1912

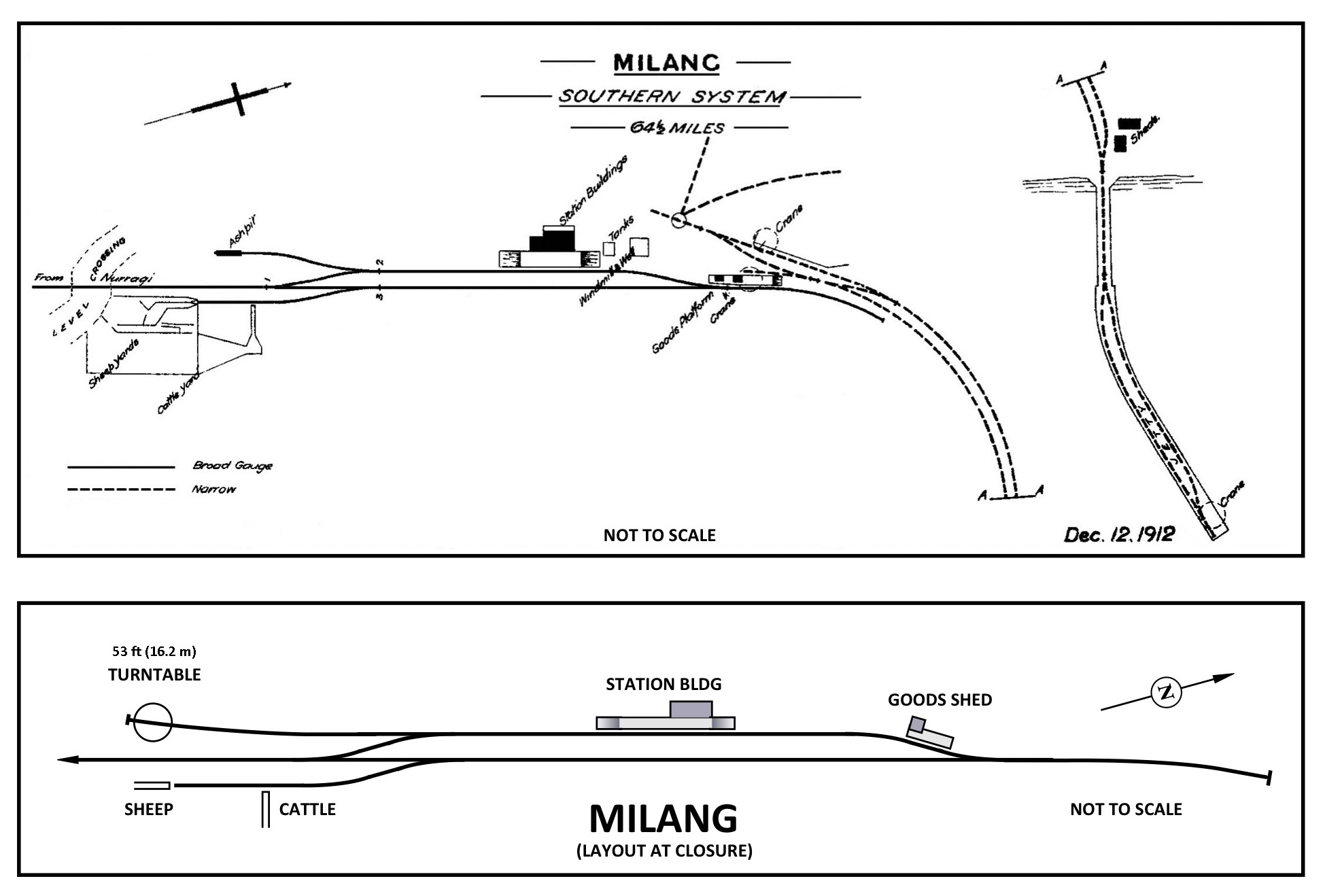
The Milang railway station yard in 1912 and 1970

Tenders were called for building the line to Strathalbyn and the branch to Milang in April 1882. The company of Walker and Swann (builders of the first section of the Intercolonial Railway between Adelaide and Aldgate that opened in March 1883) were awarded the contract for both lines and signed the papers in June 1882. The contract price was £143,678 for the main line (20 per cent lower than the survey estimate of £155,000) and £25,600 for the branch line. (Note: Based on the Retail Price Index calculated by the Australian Bureau of Statistics, 143,678 pounds in Australia in 1882 equates to approximately 18.2 million Australian dollars in 2018; £155,000 to A$19.6m; £25,600 to A$3.2m; and £20 to A$2,500.)

Five hundred men started building the main line from Mount Barker junction via Philcox Hill to Strathalbyn in November 1883, completing it in September 1884. The first load of wool was consigned from Mr A. McFarlane's property at Milang to A.H. Landseer's store at Port Adelaide. By late August, the workforce transferred en masse to the Milang branch, on which earthworks had been completed and all that was needed was to lay the rails and steel sleepers, and perform ballasting operations. The branch opened three months later, on 17 December 1884 – the same day as the line from Strathalbyn to Goolwa changed over from horse to steam power. No ceremony was performed but the public were given free rides and a special train brought invited guests from Strathalbyn, stopping almost halfway between Sandergrove and Milang for a picnic in the scrub, followed by entertainment at Milang's institute hall in the late afternoon.

== Traffic ==
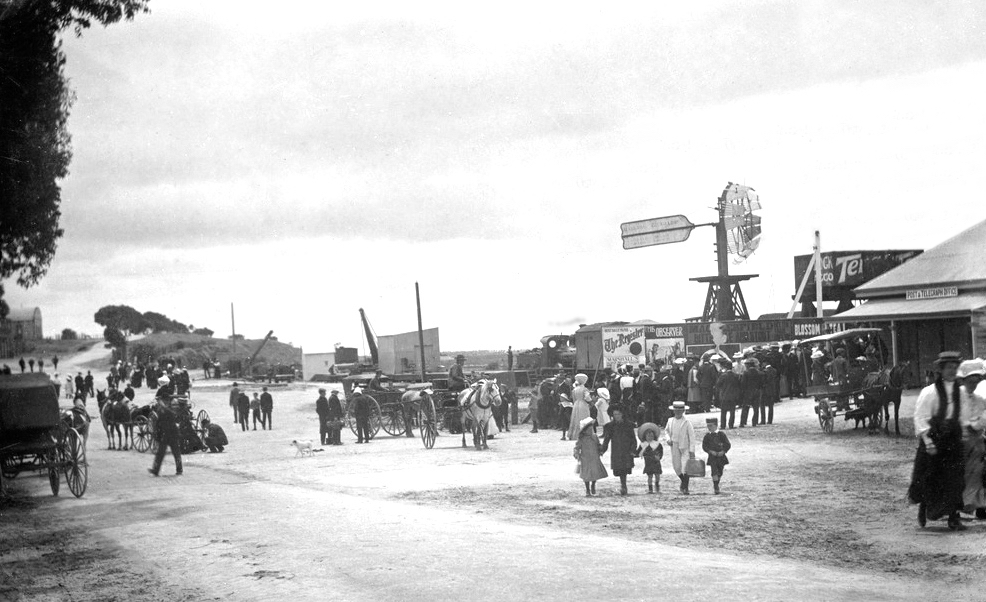
The busy precincts of Milang station, circa 1905, when the railway provided a mode of transport to the hinterland and state capital that, for the era, was fast, comfortable and convenient

The Milang terminus comprised a main line, passing siding and stock siding; the goods siding was an extension of the main line. A 16.2 m (53 ft) human-propelled turntable was provided to turn locomotives and railcars. Narrow gauge (1067 mm (3 ft 6.0 in) track was laid from its longstanding location at the jetty to the station, and all goods from river vessels – plus fish, since Milang was a flourishing fishing centre – were transferred on to broad-gauge vehicles at the wharf end of the station yard. Facilities on the way to Milang were minimal: at Sandergrove junction there was a platform and small shed; at Nurragi a passing loop about 70 metres (230 feet) long, a very short platform, and a small shed; and at Punkulde a passenger stopping sign where the Finniss to Milang road crossed the line.

Traffic of wool and supplies up and down the Murray in the early years of the Milang branch resulted in steady business, even if not large-scale. However, from 1929, when road transportation was deregulated and the economic slump of the previous two years deepened, traffic declined and did not recover. In 1931 the Transport Control Board asked the South Australian Railways to provide a report on the estimated savings to be made by closure of unprofitable branchlines, including those south of Mount Barker. Closure was averted by the prospect of heavy expenditure being needed to upgrade roads for heavy goods transport and by the expectation of impending increases in revenue following the severe drought of 1928–29 and an expected waning of the economic depression. Repeal of the 1930 Road and Railways Transport Act in 1964 exposed the railways to intense competition from road transport and reduced traffic severely. The line stumbled on for another six years before it closed.

Freight and livestock at Milang, 1890–1969
Year	Goods inwards (tons)	Goods outwards (tons)	Livestock inwards (head)	Livestock outwards (head)
1890	1101	566	Not avail.	5313
1900	1756	1490	Not avail.	14,000
1910	3576	1970	Not avail.	16,000
1920	3807	1422	Not avail.	13,000
1930 (Note: Road transport had been deregulated in 1929.)	1613	1674	1218	7391
1940	1764	477	2267	4044
1950	1580	1615	861	1948
1960	1043	1090	1556	2834
1969 (Note: The South Australian Railways' protection since 1930 through licensing of the carriage of "goods for hire" ceased in 1964.)	234	650	—	—
Source: Bird (1970)

Other than in the early years, safety in train operation was secured by the train order system. A mixed (freight and passenger) steam-hauled train provided the service from Strathalbyn until 1925, when new Brill Model 55 railcars commenced running daily between Adelaide and Milang. (Note: The schedule was: depart Adelaide 7.02 am, arrive Milang 10.50 am; depart Milang 3.20 pm, arrive Adelaide 6.48 pm.) A goods train worked several times a week from Strathalbyn. By the late 1930s, a larger Brill Model 75 railcar stationed at Strathalbyn worked all Milang services except for a weekly locomotive-hauled train. From 1942 to 1968, all goods and livestock traffic was in four-wheeled vehicles towed by the railcar. (Note: The load limit of these vehicles was 25 tons behind 55 class railcars and 50 tons behind 75 class railcars) In 1968 (the year the passenger service was halted), legislative protection of goods traffic on the South Australian Railways ceased and traffic plummeted on the line. Motive power for solely goods traffic was then provided on demand by mainline trains (Note: Hauled by 830 class locomotives.) doubling back from Sandergrove or Strathalbyn as necessary until the line was closed two years later.

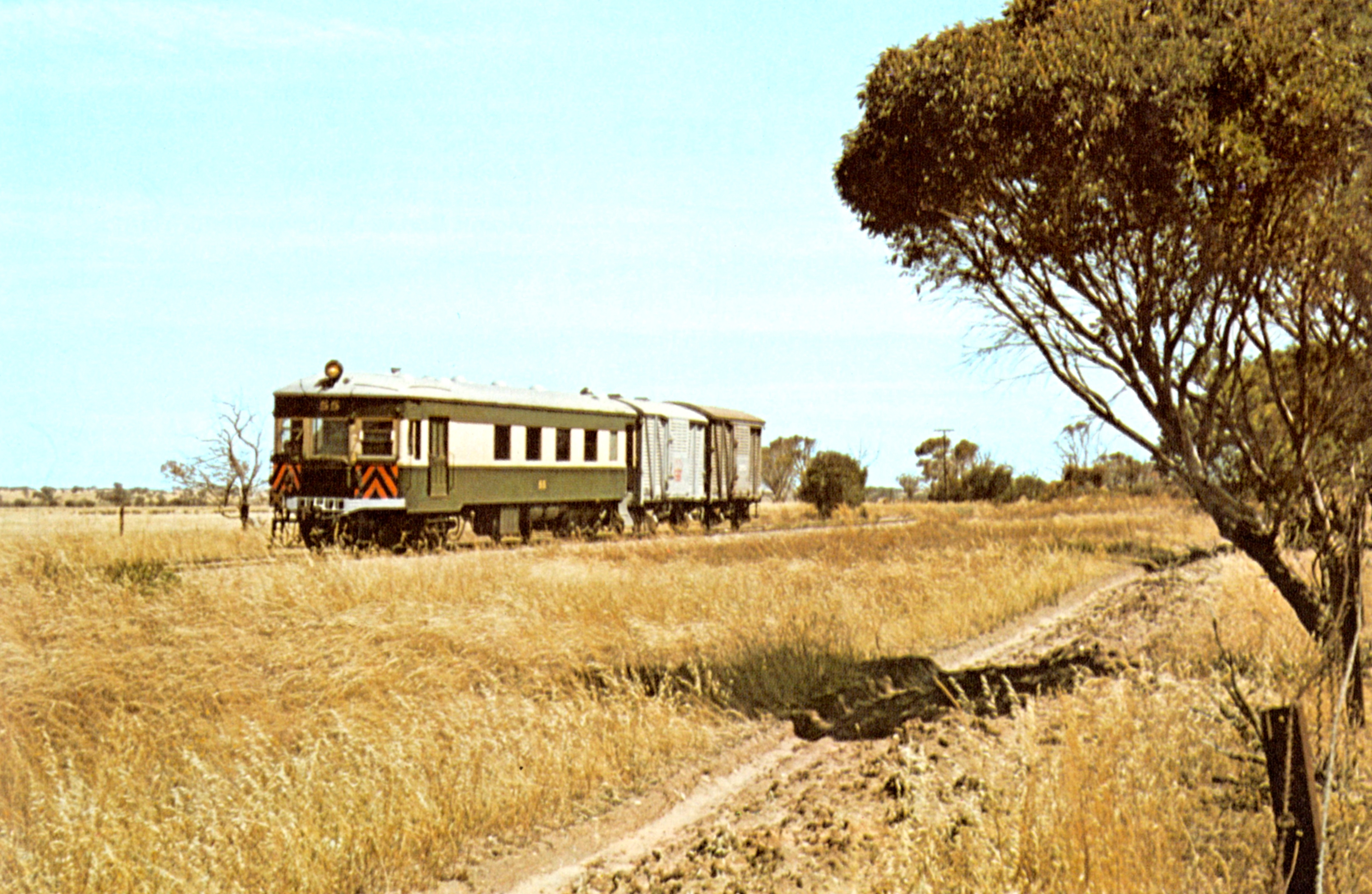
A familiar sight for many years: from 1942 until passenger services ended in 1968, most goods and livestock traffic was in one or two four-wheeled vehicles towed by a Model 75 railcar on the regular passenger schedule

The maximum speed permitted on the line was 30 mph (48 km/h), but a journalist taken on a train just before the line opened enthused:

[After going up a long grade on leaving Sandergrove], the remainder of the course being over a dead level of about the most dull, uninteresting scrub country one could well imagine, the line running so straight that the eye can only see the 'vanishing point' ahead ... we bowled along at considerably over 30 miles an hour.

... [On approaching Milang, the train] entered by a graceful curve, skirting the side and front of the township, giving a beautiful view of the lake, and joining the old jetty tramway just in front of Mr Landseer's warehouses.

Milang line timetable, 1966
Adelaide–Milang
		Sat am	Tue and Wed am	Fri pm	Sat pm	Sun pm	Fri pm
Adelaide	dep	9.00			12.55		6.10
Strathalbyn	arr	10.57*			2.47*		8.04*
	dep	11.20	11.45	12.45	3.10	4.00	8.30
Milang	arr	11.57	12.02	1.22	3.47	4.35	9.07
Milang–Adelaide
		Sat pm	Tue, Wed & Fri pm		Sun pm	Sat pm	Fri pm
Milang	dep	1.35	2.07		4.50	5.10	9.40
Strathalbyn	arr	2.12	2.45		5.25*	5.45*	10.08
	dep				5.56	6.16	
Adelaide	arr				8.00	8.20	
* Connects with Adelaide–Victor Harbor line trains at Strathalbyn

In 1969, a review by the Transport Control Board found that even on the Strathalbyn–Victor Harbor line, a total of only 4,500 passengers had boarded at stations during the previous year; closure of the lines south of Strathalbyn was recommended. The Parliamentary Standing Committee on Public Works then recommended an attempt be made to reinvigorate freight traffic rather than immediate closure of the main route, but recommended closure of the Milang branch. By then, although goods trains had operated occasionally, the last timetabled passenger service had run, on 30 November 1968. A special charter trip was operated on 15 June 1970, two days before the line was formally closed.

== Milang railway museum ==
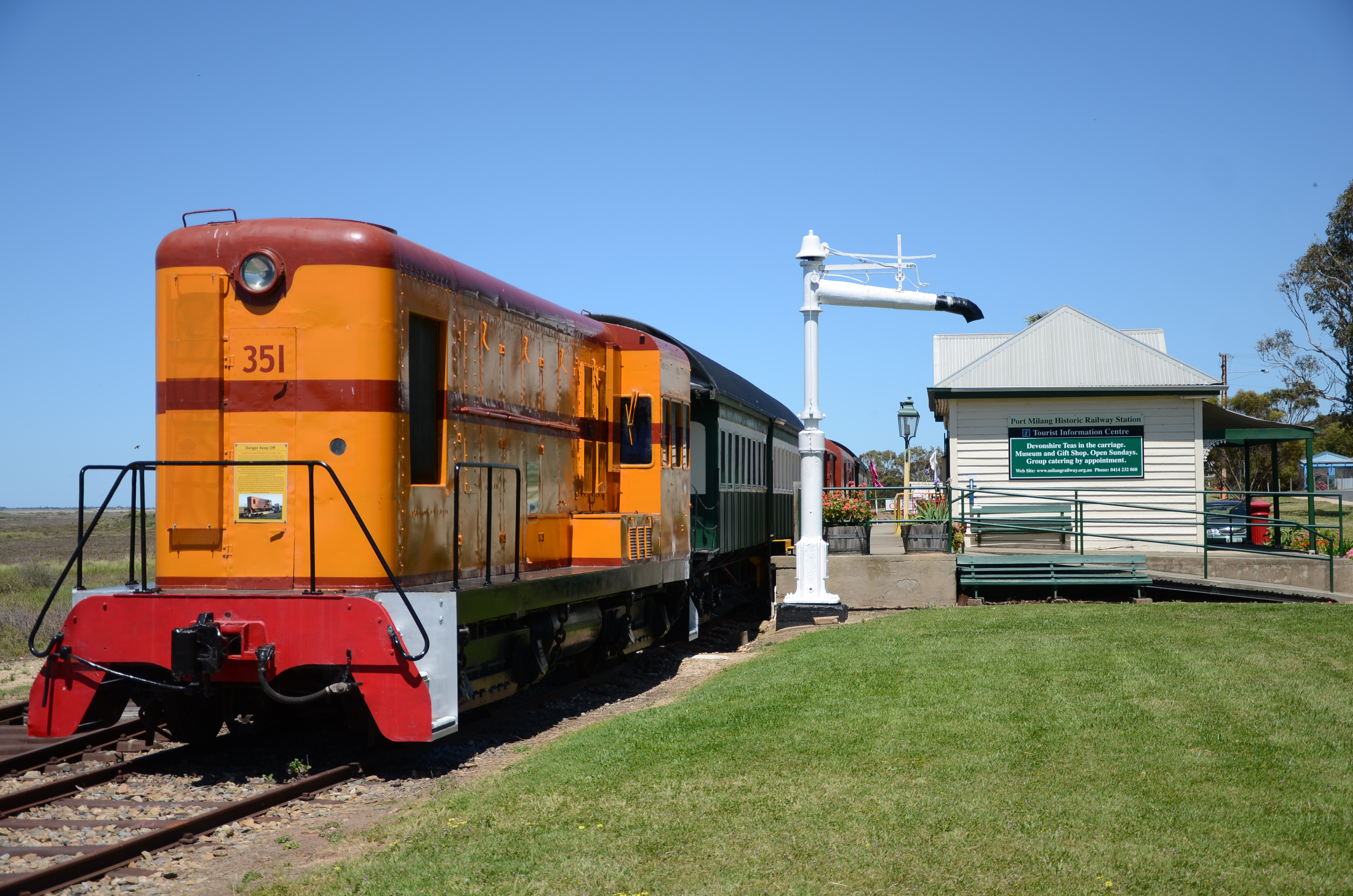
The Milang railway museum's static-display locomotive 351 can be "driven" by visitors using a driving simulator in the cab

The Milang Historical Railway Museum, which opened in 1992, has become one of Milang's major attractions. After the line was closed, the track and structures had been removed; the wooden station building was purchased and used for 20 years as an outbuilding on a farm. Subsequently, it was donated to the museum and members transported it back to its original site, to become the centrepiece of the museum on a new platform. All track and ballast had been removed, so museum members acquired and installed components that allowed them to replicate the previous track layout.

Railway memorabilia and displays of the railway-era history of the town and surrounding districts are situated in the building and in several items of rolling stock next to the platform. An innovative feature in the cab of a static-display diesel locomotive cab is a computer operated driving simulator that visitors can operate. (Note: The museum, including the locomotive driving simulator, entry to both of which is stated to be free, is open on Saturdays and Sundays from noon to 4 pm. Children under 10 need adult assistance to use the simulator because the locomotive's controls are heavy after many years of use.) In the station building the focus is on the South Australian Railways and the importance of the railway to the district. On display are many old photos and railway memorabilia.

The story of the light railways of South Australia – of which there were about 700, operating in mines, forests, wineries, munitions factories and quarries, and at jetties to transport goods from ships – is also told on many wall displays, and models of rolling stock that ran on those railways are adjacent. Visitors can operate a model light railway. Outside In the station yard, three historic light railway locomotives and two section cars are on display. This aspect of the museum, operating under the name of the South Australian Light Railway Centre, is the result of collaboration between museum members, the Light Railway Research Society of Australia and the History Trust of South Australia.

The Museum published a book about the line, The Lakes Railway, in 2018.

== Rail trail (Nurragi conservation reserve) ==
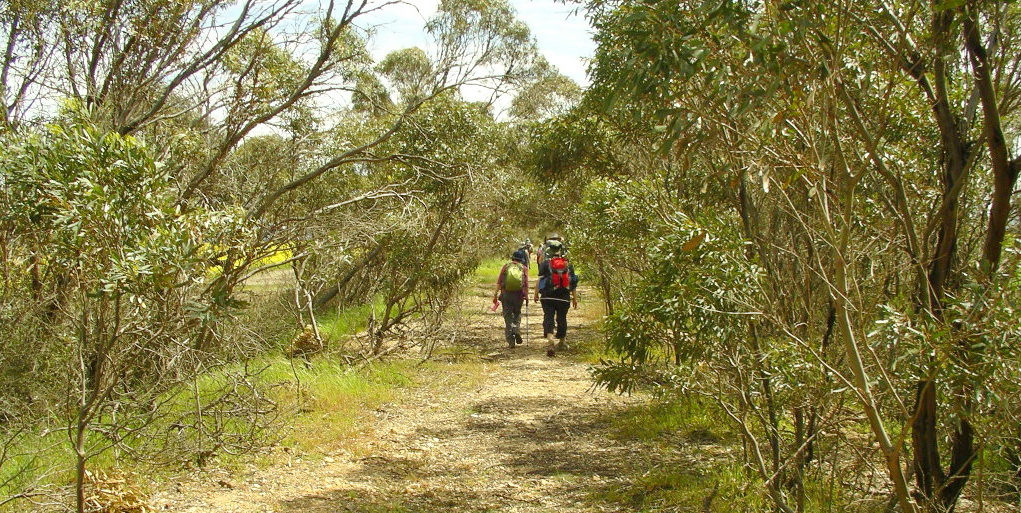
The route of the Milang railway line, now the Nurragi Conservation Reserve, is a popular walking trail

The right-of-way of the former railway line was declared in 1991 as the Nurragi Conservation Reserve, permanently protected by a native vegetation heritage agreement. Linking the eastern Mount Lofty Ranges and Lake Alexandrina, it contains extremely important remnant native vegetation in a region that has been cleared of more than 98 per cent of its original cover.

More than 300 native plant species are present in the conservation reserve, of which more than 50 are of particular conservation significance. A community group, the Friends of Nurragi Association, has worked to re-establish flora indigenous to the Milang Scrub, which originally extended from Belvidere in the north to Point Sturt in the south and Finniss to the west; (Note: Belvidere is at 35°17′S 138°56′E; Point Sturt 35°30′S 139°01′E; and Finniss 35°24′S 138°50′E.) local primary school children have also taken part. Bare areas are being revegetated with species of the original Milang Scrub, including Aboriginal food plants such as muntries, quandongs and native currants. The reserve is also an important link for wildlife and birds between the lakeside environment and the foothills, providing them with food and protective cover.
