= Lake Albert (South Australia) =

Lake in South Australia

- Yarli (Ngarrindjeri)
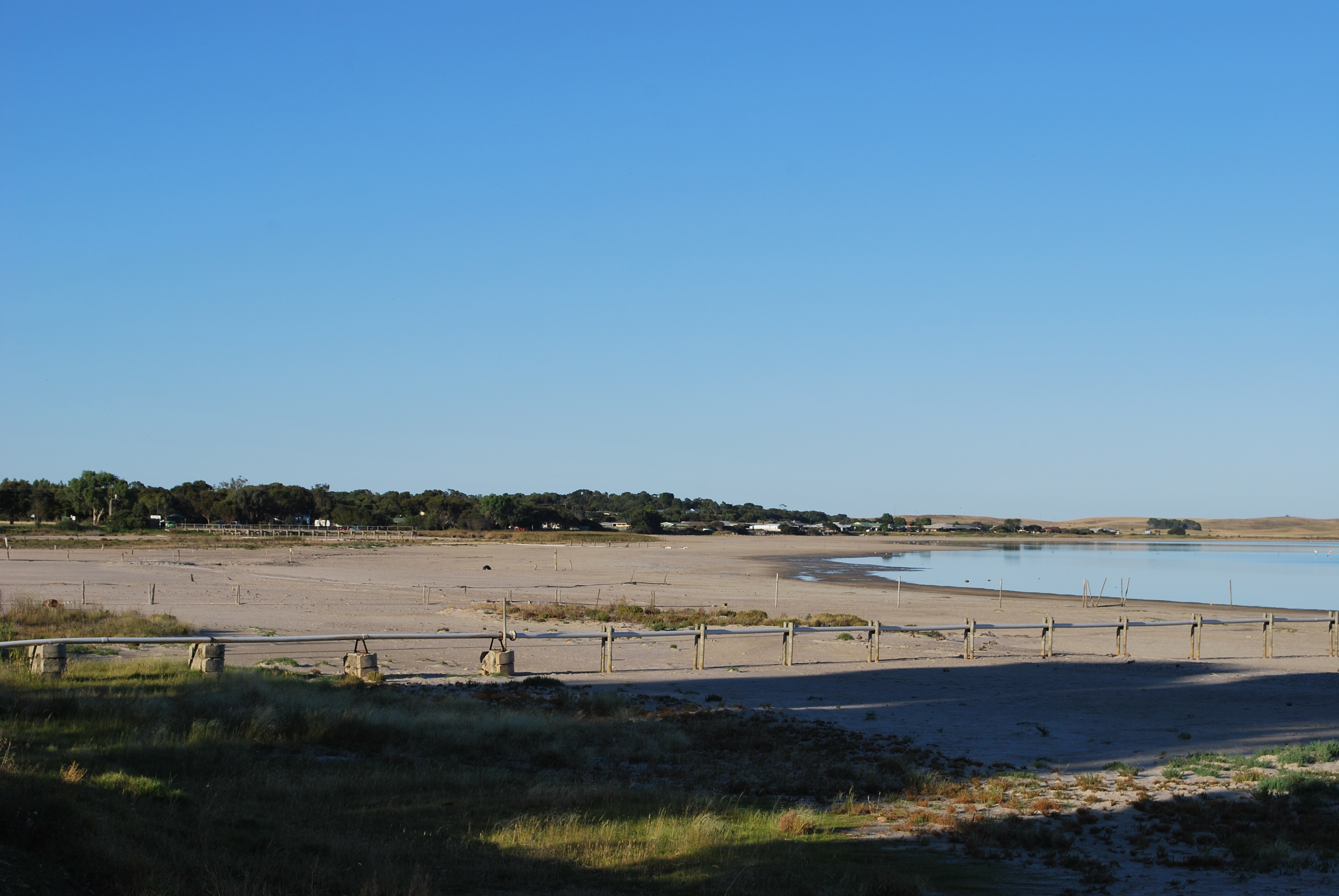
- Lake Albert seen from Meningie

- Location within South Australia
- Location: South Australia
- Coordinates: 35°38′S 139°17′E
- Etymology: Prince Albert of Saxe-Coburg and Gotha
- Part of: Murray–Darling basin
- Basin countries: Australia
- Managing agency: Department of Environment and Water
- Designation: Ramsar/DIWA wetlands (part)
- Surface area: 168 square kilometres (65 sq mi)
- Islands: Bascombe Island
- Settlements: Meningie, Narrung

Ramsar Wetland
- Official name: The Coorong, Lake Alexandrina & Albert Wetland
- Designated: 1 November 1985
- Reference no.: 321

Lake Albert, also known by its Ngarrindjeri name, Yarli, is a notionally fresh water lake near the mouth of the Murray River in South Australia. It is filled by water flowing in from the larger Lake Alexandrina at its mouth near Narrung. It is separated on the south by the Narrung Peninsula from the salt-water Coorong. The only major town on the lake is Meningie. Lakes Alexandrina and Albert are together known as the Lower Lakes.

== Naming of lake ==
The lake was named after Prince Albert, the Consort of Queen Victoria, by George Gawler, the Governor of South Australia.

== Tourism ==
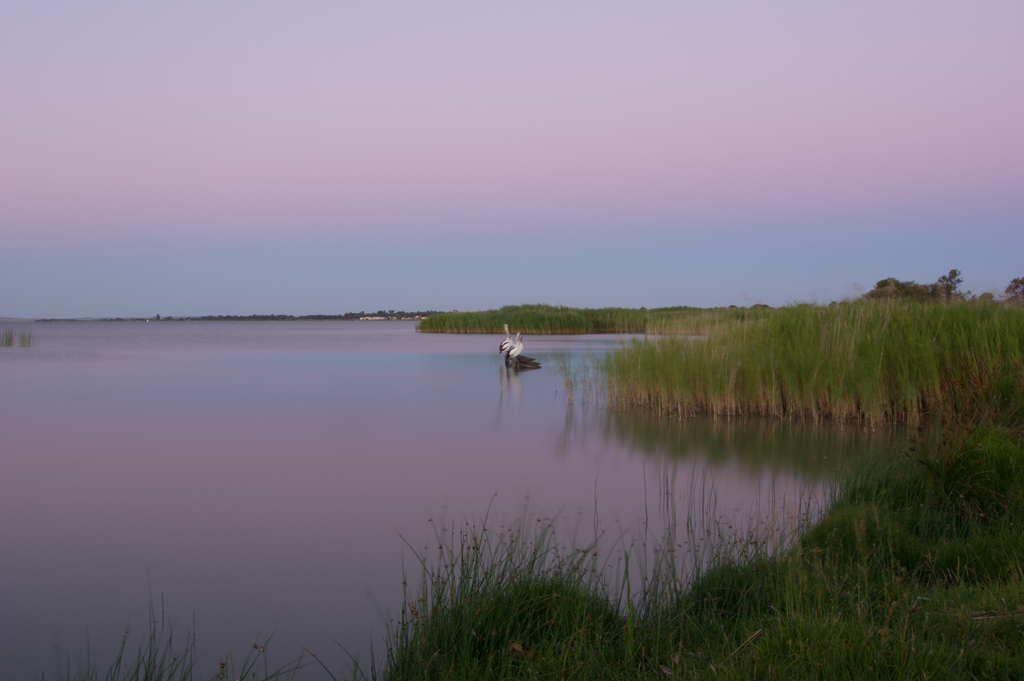
Two pelicans on Lake Albert at Meningie

Lake Albert is visited regularly by people travelling to and from Melbourne, the Limestone Coast, the Coorong National Park, Tailem Bend, Murray Bridge, and Adelaide.

Visitors enjoy fishing, camping, bushwalking, 4WD tracks, bird watching and water sports.

== Water problems ==
Because there are no significant tributaries and a high evaporation rate, Lake Albert is saltier than Lake Alexandrina. It is also smaller and not as deep, but it is more protected from the elements. In 2008, water levels in Lake Alexandrina and Lake Albert became so low that large quantities of acid sulphate soils started to form. The possibility of flooding the lake with seawater to prevent acidification was raised, and tension remains between South Australia and the upstream states over how to share the dwindling supply of water. To this day the lake remains at significant risk of water loss and high salinity.

== Flora and fauna ==
=== Birds ===
Lake Albert supports critically endangered orange-bellied parrots, endangered Australasian bitterns, vulnerable fairy terns, as well as over 1% of the world populations of Cape Barren geese, Australian shelducks, great cormorants and sharp-tailed sandpipers.

== Protected area status ==
=== Australian government ===
Lake Albert is part of the wetland complex known as the Coorong and Lakes Alexandrina and Albert Wetland which is listed as a Ramsar site. The wetland is also appears in the non-statutory list known as A Directory of Important Wetlands in Australia.

=== Non-statutory arrangements ===
Lake Albert is included within the boundary of the Lakes Alexandrina and Albert Important Bird Area which is an area considered by BirdLife International to be a place of "international significance for the conservation of birds and other biodiversity".

== Administrative status ==
The full extent of Lake Albert was gazetted as a rural locality on 8 May 2014 along with Lake Alexandrina. The boundary of the locality of Lake Albert with the rural locality of Lake Alexandrina occurs at the alignment of Poltalloch Road within the locality of Poltalloch on the northern side of the Albert Channel which connects both lakes. The locality was included in the 2016 census and was found to have no people living within its boundaries. It also shares the postcode of 5259 with the adjoining localities of Narrung and Poltalloch.

== See also ==
- List of islands within the Murray River in South Australia
