= Milang, South Australia =

Milang South Australia
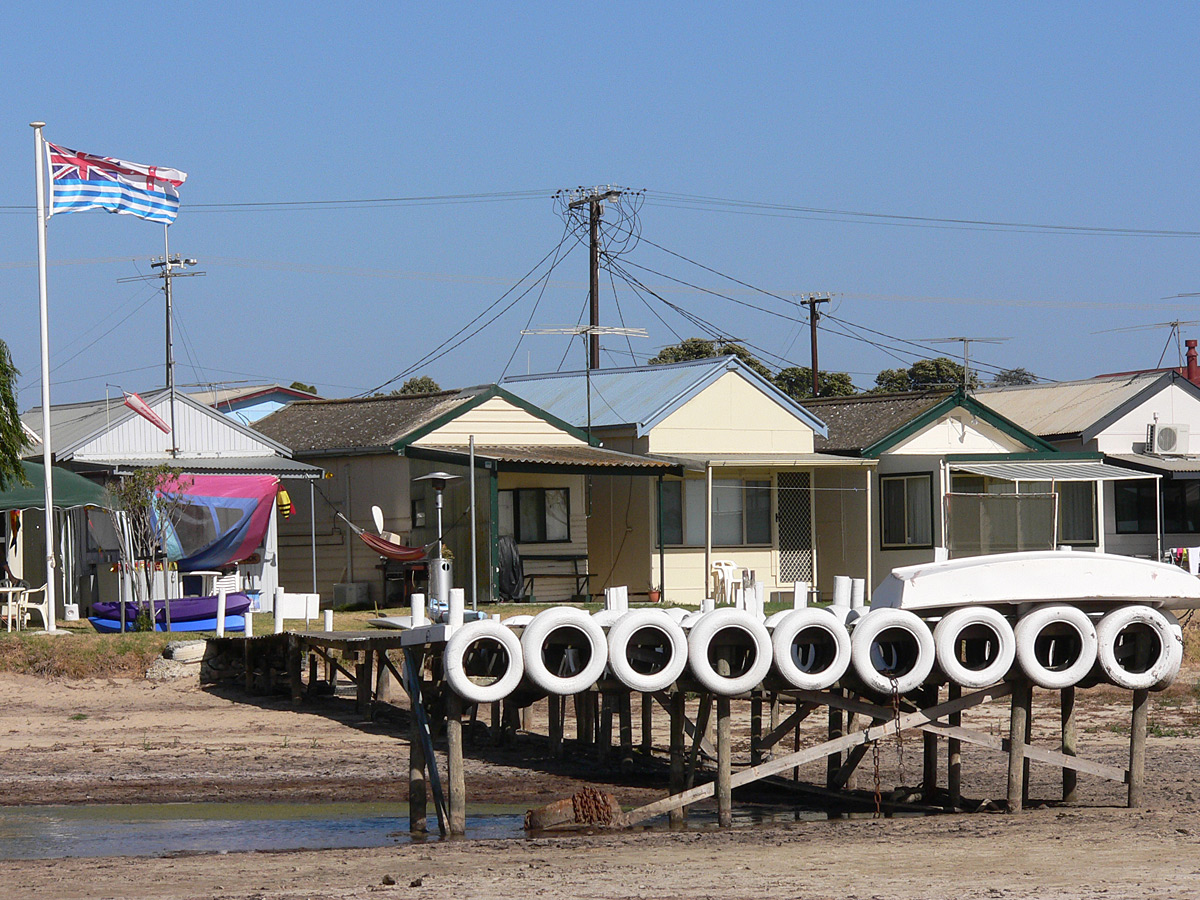
- Milang

- Coordinates: 35°24′22″S 138°58′17″E
- Population: 831 (UCL 2021)
- Established: 1853
- Postcode(s): 5256
- Time zone: ACST (UTC+9:30)
  - Summer (DST): ACDT (UTC+10.30)
- Location: 63 km (39 mi) SE of Adelaide; 20 km (12 mi) NE of Goolwa
- LGA(s): Alexandrina Council
- Region: Fleurieu and Kangaroo Island
- State electorate(s): Finniss
- Federal division(s): Mayo
Localities around Milang:
Angas Plains; Nurragi	Angas Plains	Lake Plains
Nurragi; Finniss	Milang	Lake Plains; Lake Alexandrina
Clayton Bay	Clayton Bay	Point Sturt
- Footnotes: Locations; Adjoining localities

Milang (/məˈlæŋ/ m(ə)-LANG) is a town and locality located in the Australian state of South Australia on the west coast of Lake Alexandrina about 71 kilometres (44 mi) south-east of the state capital of Adelaide and about 20 kilometres (12 mi) north-east of the municipal seat of Goolwa.

== History ==
The town was surveyed in December 1853; it became a significant port on the River Murray system between 1860 and 1880. Between December 1884 and June 1970, a branch line off the Mount Barker–Victor Harbor railway ran 13.1 km (8.1 mi) from a junction at Sandergrove to Milang, mainly for freight traffic but also as a minor passenger service. The line was dismantled after its closure in 1970.

Milang played an historic role as host to the first South Australian Boy Scout camp in the summer of 1909–1910; a bronze plaque marks the location.

Milang Football Club, the Milang Panthers, compete in the Hills Football League C Grade competition.

== Heritage listings ==
Milang has many 19th century buildings, and some heritage-listed sites, including:

- Coxe Street: 1867 Royal Salute cannon, Soldiers Memorial Park
- 46-50 Coxe Street: Milang School
- 22-23 Daranda Terrace: Milang Butter Factory
- Lake front: Milang jetty and hand crane
- 5-7 Markland Street: Dwelling with pressed iron facade

=== Butter Factory ===
The Milang Lakeside Butter Factory, whose original buildings date from 1893, made butter from the milk brought to the jetty from surrounding small farms. Much of the butter was sent to the Western Australian Goldfields. In 1919, it was bought by Farmers Union, who added and a manager's cottage. However operations ceased in the 1960s.

Parts of the factory were used during the filming of the television series Shadows of the Heart in 1990, but it remained intact and closed. The factory was added to the SA Heritage Register on 11 June 1998.

After the factory and manager's cottage came up for sale in 2014, a group of residents of the small town got together and lobbied the council to buy the property, and then proceeded to apply for a series of grants to restore the buildings. The council donated A$350,000 towards the purchase of the factory, and various other organisations gave grants to cover the cost of engineering and preserving works. Members of the community held many fundraisers put in many hours of work over 10 years, until, by February 2024, just a few jobs were left to complete the restoration.

== Location and governance ==
Milang is situated at the west coast of Lake Alexandrina, around 71 kilometres (44 mi) south-east of Adelaide and 20 kilometres (12 mi) north-east of the municipal seat of Goolwa.

It lies within the federal division of Mayo, the state electoral district of Hammond and the local government area of the Alexandrina Council.

In the 2021 Australian census, there were 831 people in the locality of Milang.

== Tourist attractions ==
Milang tourist attractions include fishing from the state heritage-listed jetty, the Milang Historical Society museum, the Milang Historical Walk, and boating and swimming on Lake Alexandrina.

The Milang Historical Railway Museum, opened in 1992 and located in the station building of the now-closed Milang railway line, features many old photos and railway memorabilia from the era when Milang was a significant port for the River Murray shipping trade. It has become one of Milang's major attractions with its displays of the railway-era history of the town and surrounding districts, its locomotive and carriages and, in the locomotive, a computer operated driving simulator that visitors over the age of 10 can operate.

Another railway-themed attraction is the South Australian Light Railway Centre, on the museum site, which tells the story of about 700 light railways that once operated in the state in mines, forests, wineries, munitions factories and quarries, and at jetties to transport goods from ships. It includes three historic locomotives and two section cars, displays, rolling stock models, and a model light railway that visitors can drive.
