= Narrung, South Australia =

Narrung South Australia
- Coordinates: 35°30′49″S 139°10′01″E
- Population: 183 (SAL 2021)
- Established: 25 April 1907 (town); 24 August 2000 (locality)
- Postcode(s): 5259
- Time zone: ACST (UTC+9:30)
  - Summer (DST): ACST (UTC+10:30)
- Location: 145 km (90 mi) SE of Adelaide; 73 km (45 mi) S of Murray Bridge; 41 km (25 mi) NW of Meningie
- LGA(s): Coorong District Council
- Region: Murray and Mallee
- County: Russell
- State electorate(s): MacKillop
- Federal division(s): Barker
Localities around Narrung:
Lake Alexandrina	Lake Alexandrina; Lake Albert	Lake Albert
Lake Alexandrina	Narrung	Lake Albert
Coorong	Meningie West	Lake Albert
- Footnotes: Adjoining localities

Narrung is a town and locality in the Australian state of South Australia. It is situated at the northern extent of the Narrung Peninsula, which separates The Coorong from Lake Albert adjacent to The Narrows which separates Lake Albert from the larger Lake Alexandrina. The area of Narrung includes the Aboriginal (Ngarrindjeri) community of Raukkan.

Narrung is located within the federal division of Barker, the state electoral district of MacKillop and the local government area of the Coorong District Council.

== See also ==
- List of crossings of the Murray River
- Loveday Bay (South Australia)
