= Sandergrove, South Australia =

Sandergrove South Australia
- Coordinates: 35°20′0″S 138°52′19″E
- Population: 98 (SAL 2021)
- Postcode(s): 5255
- Elevation: 43 m (141 ft)
- Location: 9 km (6 mi) S of Strathalbyn
- LGA(s): Alexandrina Council
- Region: Fleurieu and Kangaroo Island
- County: Hindmarsh
- State electorate(s): Heysen
- Federal division(s): Mayo
Localities around Sandergrove:
Strathalbyn	Strathalbyn	Strathalbyn
Ashbourne; Finniss	Sandergrove	Angas Plains; Nurragi
Finniss	Finniss	Nurragi
- Footnotes: Adjoining localities

Sandergrove is a locality in the Australian state of South Australia about 9 km (5.5 mi) south of Strathalbyn. It was a junction on the Victor Harbor railway line, where the Milang railway line branched off. The railway was authorised in 1881 and closed in 1970.

The north-western end of the Nurragi Conservation Reserve, a private protected area which follows the alignment of the former Milang railway line as a rail trail, terminates at Sandergrove.

== History ==
In 1863, the Strathalbyn Methodist circuit included a church at Sandergrove. It still existed in 1900, but it was not part of the circuit by 1963. The Sandergrove Primary School opened in 1923, but has since closed.
