= Lake Alexandrina (South Australia) =

Fresh water lake in South Australia

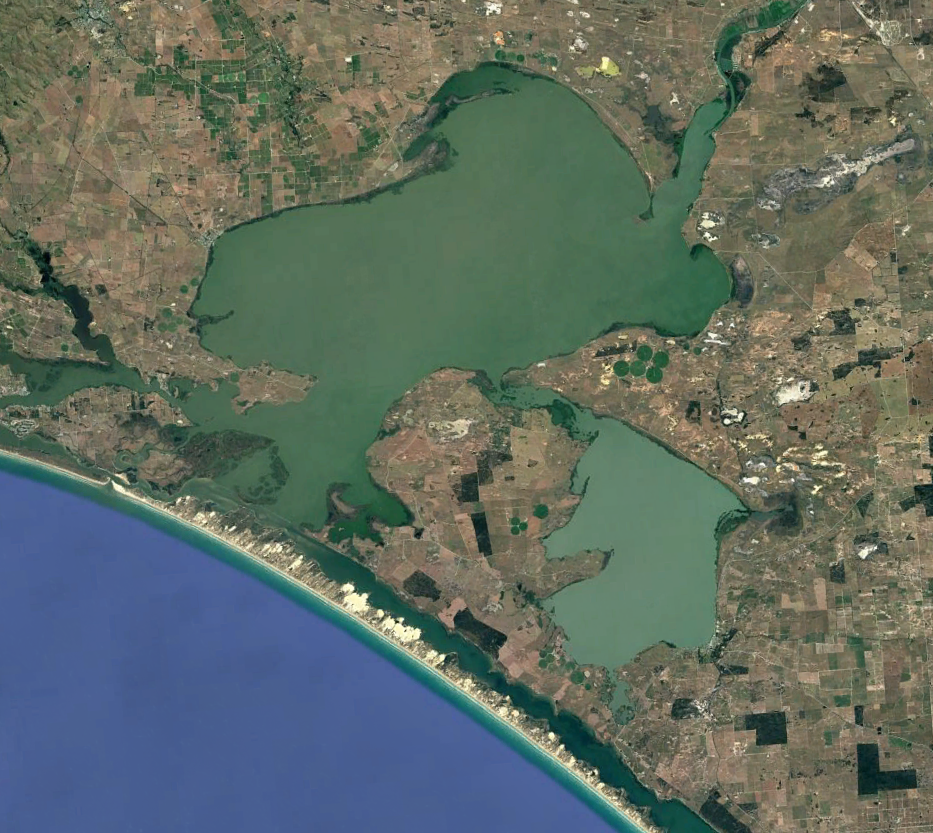
- Lake Alexandrina is the larger lake to the left. Lake Albert is the smaller lake to the right.

- Location in South Australia
- Location: South Australia
- Coordinates: 35°27′S 139°09′E
- Type: Freshwater
- Primary inflows: Murray, Bremer, Angas, and Finniss Rivers
- Primary outflows: Murray Mouth
- Catchment area: 1,061,469 km^{2} (409,835 mi^{2})
- Basin countries: Australia
- Surface area: 64,900 ha (251 mi^{2})
- Average depth: 2.8 m (9.2 ft)
- Max. depth: 6 m (20 ft)
- Water volume: 1,610 GL (430×10^{9} US gal; 350×10^{9} imp gal)
- Surface elevation: 0.75 m (2.5 ft)
- Settlements: Clayton Bay, Milang, Raukkan

Ramsar Wetland
- Official name: The Coorong, Lake Alexandrina & Albert Wetland
- Designated: 1 November 1985
- Reference no.: 321

Lake Alexandrina is a coastal freshwater lake located between the Fleurieu and Kangaroo Island and Murray and Mallee regions on Ngarrindjeri country in South Australia, about 100 kilometres (62 mi) south-east of Adelaide. The lake adjoins the smaller Lake Albert (together known as the Lower Lakes) and a coastal lagoon called The Coorong to its southeast, before draining into the Great Australian Bight via a short, narrow opening known as Murray Mouth.

== Nomenclature ==
=== Aboriginal naming ===
Aboriginal people having an association with the lake were reported as knowing it by such names as Mungkuli, Parnka and Kayinga.

=== European naming ===
English settlers named the lake after Princess Alexandrina, niece and successor of King William IV of Great Britain and Ireland. When the princess ascended the throne and took the name Queen Victoria, there was some talk of changing the name of the lake to Lake Victoria, but the idea was dropped.

== Description ==
Lake Alexandrina is located east of Encounter Bay and the Fleurieu Peninsula within the contemporary South Australian government regions of the Fleurieu and Kangaroo Island and Murray Mallee regions. The Murray River is the principal inflow to the lake. Additional tributaries include the Bremer, Angas, and Finniss rivers, which drain the eastern slopes of the southern Mount Lofty Ranges. The lake is shallow and contains a number of low-lying islands, particularly towards its southern extent. Loveday Bay is an inlet located on the south-eastern margin of Lake Alexandrina, adjacent to the Tauwitchere Channel. The lake is connected by a narrow channel to the smaller Lake Albert to the south-east.

Lake Alexandrina drains towards the Southern Ocean via the Murray Mouth, located south-east of Goolwa. Under conditions of low river discharge, the Murray Mouth is periodically closed by a sand bar, restricting exchange between the river system and the ocean. To regulate water levels and maintain freshwater conditions in the Lower Lakes system for irrigation, a series of barrages, collectively known as the Goolwa Barrages, were constructed across five channels between the mainland and islands near the Murray Mouth.

Although the lake has historically experienced periods of connection with the ocean, hydrological studies indicate that freshwater conditions have predominated under typical river inflow regimes, with saline incursions largely restricted to episodic events associated with low discharge or marine high tides and storm surges. Where marine water enters the system, mixing with freshwater is generally limited, both vertically and laterally, depending on hydrodynamic conditions. A synthesis of research published in 2020 concluded that the Lower Lakes–Coorong–Murray Mouth system exhibited predominantly freshwater characteristics prior to European settlement, while acknowledging natural variability across time and space within the system.

Hindmarsh Island lies within the Lower Lakes system and is influenced by both riverine and marine processes due to its position between freshwater inflows and the estuarine reach of the Murray Mouth. It has been described in some sources as the largest island in the world to have freshwater on one side and saline water on the other, reflecting the contrasting hydrological conditions that can occur under varying river discharge and mouth openness.

== History ==
Edward Wilson, visiting the lake in the 1850s described it as follows:

"Lake Alexandrina is the finest sheet of fresh water I ever saw. Indeed so formidable did it look, with a stiff wind blowing up quite a sufficient swell to make one seasick, that I could scarcely believe it to be fresh. Such is the fact however. It is forty or fifty miles long by twelve or fifteen wide and the shores around it receded into the dim distance until they become invisible, in the way which we are accustomed only with ideas of salt water. Supplied almost entirely by the Murray, the whole lake retains the muddy tinge of which I have spoken, and this sadly detracts from the otherwise beautiful appearances of this magnificent sheet of water."

The Point McLeay mission was established by George Taplin on the shore of the lake in 1859 and became an Aboriginal reserve in 1916. It was handed back to the Ngarrindjeri people in 1974, and renamed Raukkan in 1982. Inventor and author David Unaipon is from Raukkan.

In 2008, water levels in Lake Alexandrina and Lake Albert became so low that there was a high risk of large quantities of acid sulphate soils forming. The soils on the lake beds are naturally rich in iron sulphides. When exposed to the air, such as may occur in a time of severe drought, the sulphides oxidise, producing sulphuric acid. The barrages now prevent the seawater inflows that had formerly prevented this phenomenon in every drought since the last ice age. A weir was proposed near Pomanda Point where the river entered the lake, to protect upriver and Adelaide's water supplies should it become necessary to open the barrages, but this plan was dropped by the South Australian government after a campaign by the River, Lakes and Coorong Action Group highlighted the many environmental problems such a weir would cause.

== Environment ==
Turtles live in the lake, with lizards and snakes being present along the shoreline. Insect species include dragonflies, a range of moths and butterflies, and large numbers of beetles (coleoptera). Freshwater fish inhabit the lake, including the introduced European carp. The soils around the lake are relatively low in organic carbon, although good barley and vegetable crops may be produced. Non-wetting soils are present along the south eastern bounds of Lake Albert and in areas around Lake Alexandrina.

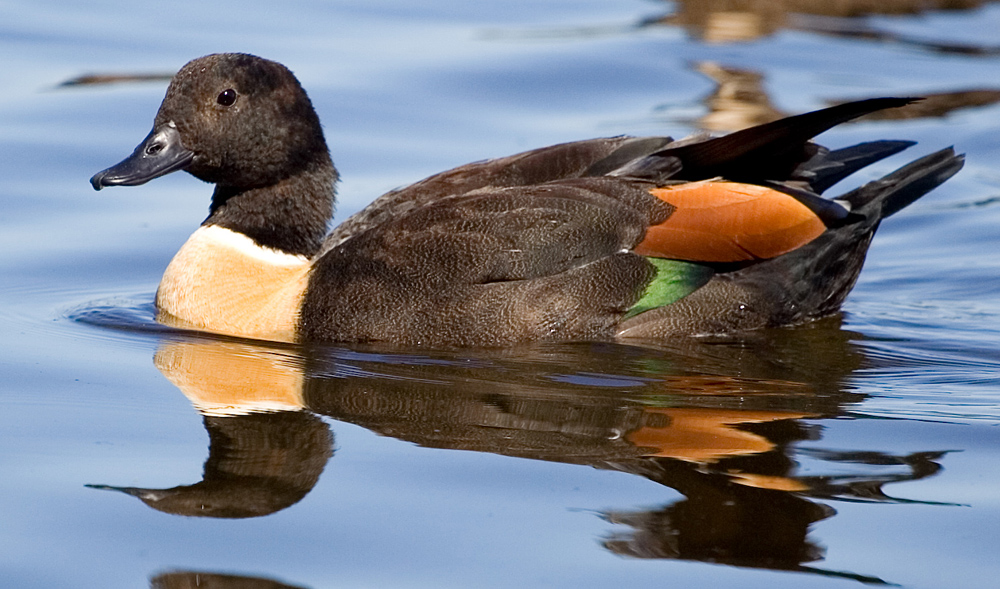
The area is important for Australian shelducks

=== Birds ===
The lake is a habitat for many species of waterbird, including migratory waders, or shorebirds, which breed in northern Asia and Alaska. Species supported by the lake include the critically endangered orange-bellied parrots, endangered Australasian bitterns, vulnerable fairy terns, as well as over 1% of the world populations of Cape Barren geese, Australian shelducks, great cormorants and sharp-tailed sandpipers.

== Protected area status ==
=== Australian government ===
Lake Alexandrina is part of the wetland complex known as the Coorong and Lakes Alexandrina and Albert Wetland which is listed as a Ramsar site. The wetland is also appears in the non-statutory list known as A Directory of Important Wetlands in Australia.

=== South Australian government ===
Lake Alexandrina includes the following protected areas declared under the National Parks and Wildlife Act 1972 - Currency Creek Game Reserve, Mud Islands Game Reserve, Salt Lagoon Islands Conservation Park and Tolderol Game Reserve.

=== Non-statutory arrangements ===
Lake Alexandrina is included within the boundary of the Lakes Alexandrina and Albert Important Bird Area which is an area considered by BirdLife International to be a place of ‘international significance for the conservation of birds and other biodiversity.’

== See also ==
- Coorong, Lower Lakes and Murray Mouth (CLLMM) Research Centre, a research centre located in Goolwa
- List of lakes of Australia § South Australia
- List of islands within the Murray River in South Australia
