= Hundred of Cotton =

- Cadastral division
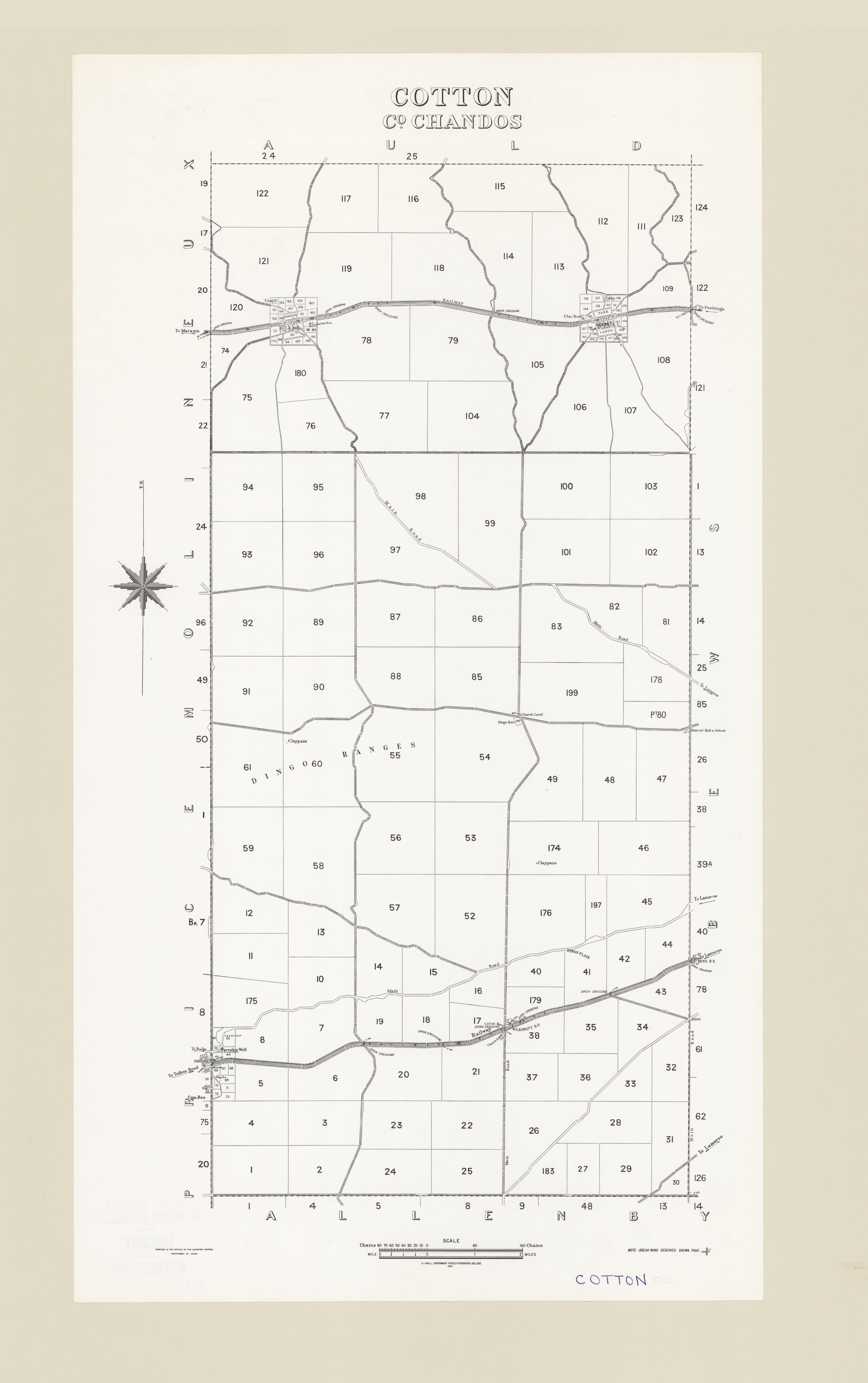
- Map of Hundred of Cotton, 1964

- Coordinates: 35.25°S 140.35°E
- Country: Australia
- State: South Australia
- Region: Murray Mallee
- Established: 1894

Area
  - Total: 560.1 km^{2} (216.25 sq mi)
- County: Chandos
Lands administrative divisions around Hundred of Cotton
Hundred of Molineux	Hundred of Auld	Hundred of Billiatt
	Hundred of Cotton	Hundred of Bews
Hundred of Price	Hundred of Allenby

The Hundred of Cotton is a hundred in the County of Chandos, South Australia, established in 1894.

The Hundred of Cotton was named on 4 January 1894 by Governor Kintore after George Witherage Cotton MLC who had been a member of the South Australian Legislative Council from 1882 to 1892.

== History ==
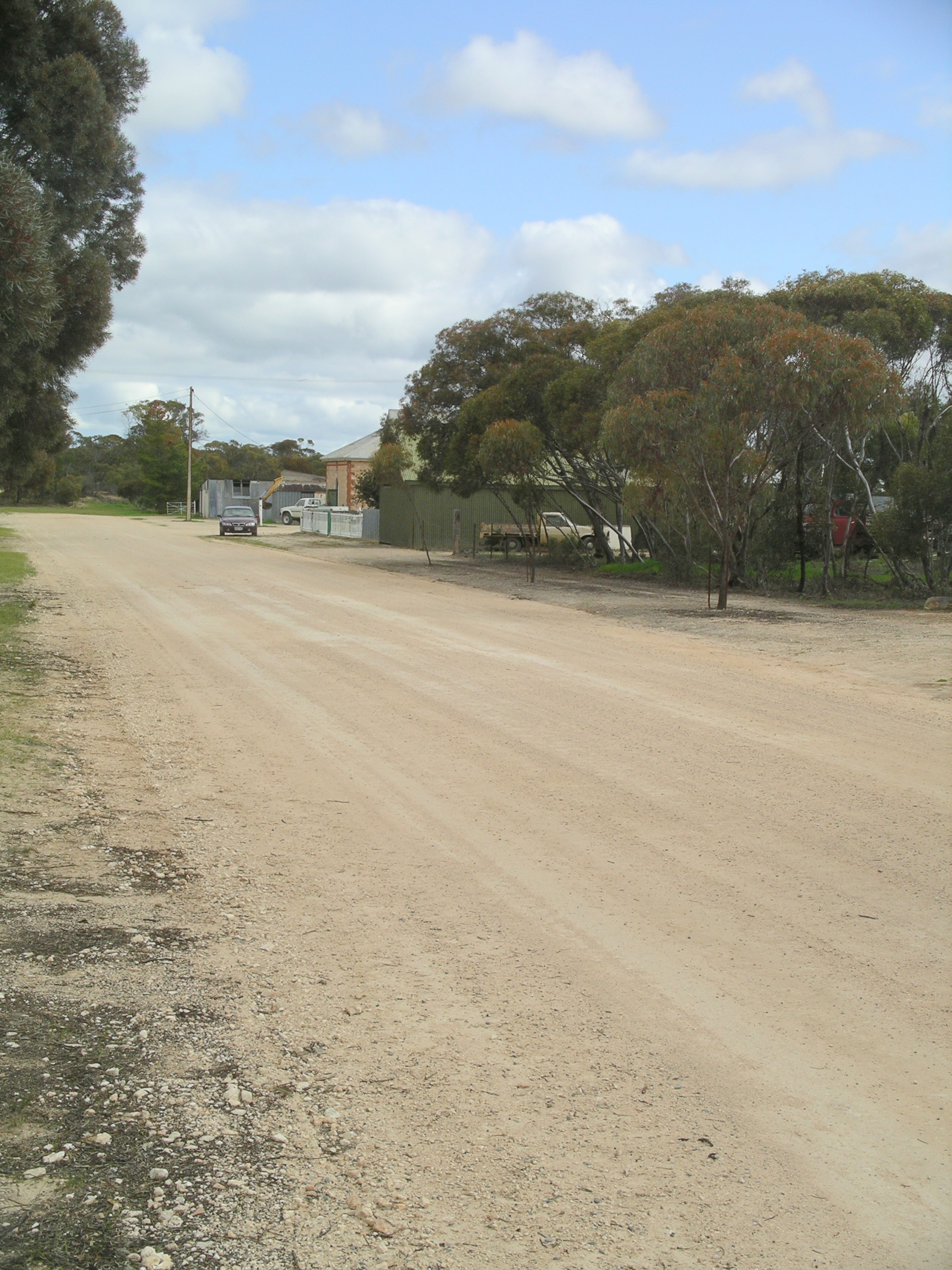
Street in Parrakie

The traditional owners of the land are the Ngargad Australian Aboriginal tribes. The explorer Edward Eyre passed through the area during his 1840-1841 travels.

The former towns of Kulkami, Mulpata and Wilkawatt are within the hundred. Modern locality boundaries put three quarters of the Hundred of Cotton on the western side of Lameroo, and the southwestern quarter in Parrakie. Neither town centre is in this Hundred.

== See also ==
- Lands administrative divisions of South Australia
