= Pinnaroo =

Pinnaroo may refer to:

== Queensland ==
- Pinnaroo Cemetery and Crematorium, Brisbane

== South Australia ==
- Pinnaroo, South Australia, a town and locality
- District Council of Pinnaroo (1908-1920), a former local government area which was renamed in 1920 as the District Council of Lameroo
- District Council of Pinnaroo, a former local government area which merged with the District Council of Lameroo to create the South Mallee District Council
- Hundred of Pinnaroo, a cadastral unit

== See also ==
- Pinnaroo railway line (disambiguation)
- Lake Pinaroo
- Parish of Pinaroo
