= Lameroo (disambiguation) =

Lameroo may refer to:

- Lameroo, South Australia, a town in the Murray Mallee region of South Australia
  - Lameroo Hawks football team
  - District Council of Lameroo former local government area
- Lameroo Beach in the Northern Territory of Australia
