= The Border Times =

Newspaper in South Australia

The Border Times, based in Pinnaroo, is the local newspaper of the Southern Mallee region of South Australia since 1911. Published weekly, it focuses on local news, sports and weather.

== History ==
The Pinnaroo & Border Times (subtitled "Circulating through the Pinnaroo and Victorian Mallee Districts") was first published on Friday 17 March 1911. On 17 May 1912, a median-subtitle was added, which read "And Walpeup Shire Recorder". On 20 April 1917, the subtitle was changed to read "Appointed official advertising organ for the West Riding of the Shire of Walpeup, Victorian Railways, Lands Department, Water Commission, and Closer Settlement Board. The Pioneer Newspaper of Pinnaroo, Murrayville, Victorian Border, Cowangie, and Other Districts", reflecting its new role in printing official announcements.

The Murrayville Pioneer (16 November 1917 - 10 May 1918), representing Murrayville across the border in Victoria, moved printing to Pinnaroo, as did its successor the Murrayville Pioneer and North Western Settler (17 May 1918 - 6 May 1927), before merging into the Times. By 1930, the subtitle was simplified to read "with which is incorporated the "Murrayville Pioneer" and "Lameroo Recorder"". On 10 July 1941, its title was simplified to Pinnaroo Border Times.

Between October 1952 and April 1953, another publication called the Border Guardian, was published for the Pinnaroo region by Smedley Press in Glenelg, when the Times briefly ceased publication between 24 July 1952 and 12 March 1953.

In 1987, it changed its title to the Border Times, and it is now part of the Taylor Group (publishers of the Murray Pioneer), dated Thursdays, but published weekly on Wednesdays.

== Distribution ==
According to the VCPA, the Border Times circulates throughout the Southern Mallee and Murraylands in SA and the north-western Mallee in Victoria, covering the district council areas of the Southern Mallee, Coorong and Karoonda East Murray, and Mildura Rural City Council in northwest Victoria, and the circulation area includes the towns of Gawler, Geranium, Jabuk, Karoonda, Lameroo, Loxton, Murray Bridge, Murrayville, Parrakie, Pinnaroo, and Waikerie.
