= Sherlock railway station =

Former railway station in South Australia, Australia

Sherlock

General information
- Location: Railway Terrace, Sherlock, South Australia
- Coordinates: 35.31807367631159°S 139.8017810234629°E
- Operator: South Australian Railways
- Line: Pinnaroo line
- Distance: 132 kilometres from Adelaide
- Platforms: 1
- Tracks: 1

Construction
- Structure type: Ground

Other information
- Status: Closed, mostly demolished

History
- Opened: January 1913
- Closed: 1968

Services
Preceding station	Aurizon	Following station
Moorlands towards Adelaide	Pinnaroo railway line, South Australia	Peake towards Panitya
Location

Sherlock railway station was located on the Pinnaroo railway line. It served the town of Sherlock, South Australia.

== History ==
Sherlock railway station opened in January 1913 on the railway line from Tailem Bend to Pinnaroo. The station had its own station master provided, along with a railway siding and an office for the station master. The station closed to regular passengers in 1968 and the line became disused in July 2015.
