= Parilla, South Australia =

Parilla South Australia
- Coordinates: 35°17′57″S 140°39′55″E
- Population: 159 (SAL 2021)
- Established: 1 August 1907 (town); 12 August 1999 (locality)
- Postcode(s): 5303
- Elevation: 104 m (341 ft)(railway station)
- Time zone: ACST (UTC+9:30)
  - Summer (DST): ACDT (UTC+10:30)
- Location: 192 km (119 mi) E of Adelaide; 22 km (14 mi) W of Pinnaroo; 14 km (9 mi) E of Lameroo
- LGA(s): Southern Mallee District Council
- Region: Murray and Mallee
- County: Chandos
- State electorate(s): Hammond
- Federal division(s): Barker
Mean max temp	Mean min temp	Annual rainfall
22.9 °C; 73 °F	8.8 °C; 48 °F	382.3 mm 15.1 in
Localities around Parilla:
Lameroo	Karte	Karte
Lameroo	Parilla	Pinnaroo
Ngarkat	Ngarkat	Ngarkat
- Footnotes: Locations; Adjoining localities

Parilla is a town and a locality in the Australian state of South Australia located in the state's Murray Mallee region about 192 kilometres (119 mi) east of the state capital of Adelaide, about 32 kilometres (20 mi) west of the municipal seat of Pinnaroo and about 14 kilometres (8.7 mi) east of the town of Lameroo.

The government town of Parilla was proclaimed on 1 August 1907 on land in the cadastral unit of the Hundred of Parilla to the immediate north of the Parilla Railway Station. The town was named after the hundred. The boundaries for the locality were created on 12 August 1999 and includes the site of the government town of Karte which is located in its approximate centre.

The 2016 Australian census which was conducted in August 2016 reports that Parilla had a population of 211.

The town's mascots are "Alf and Edith the Galah and Echidna", which can be found on the signs entering Parilla.

There is an active Church, and payphone.

The historic Surrender Tree at Neptune Farm on Parilla South Road, planted to commemorate the surrender of the Japanese in World War II, is listed on the South Australian Heritage Register.

Parilla is located within the federal division of Barker, the state electoral district of Hammond and the local government area of the Southern Mallee District Council.

== Transport and Industry ==
Parilla is on the Mallee Highway and Pinnaroo railway line between Lameroo and Pinnaroo. Parilla has traditionally been a local centre for grain growing, although it is now known for growing vegetables such as potatoes, carrots, and onions. There are bulk grain silos adjacent to the railway line, however grain is freighted out by road, as are vegetables.

== See also ==
- Karte Conservation Park
