= Pinnaroo and Border Times =

Former Local Newspaper in Pinnaroo, South Australia

Pinnaroo and Border Times (1911–1954) was a newspaper published in Pinnaroo near the eastern border of South Australia.

The newspaper was first published in May 1911. Pinnaroo was then at the centre of one of the great wheat-producing areas of South Australia and Victoria. The final issue, Vol 44. No. 52, was published on 23 December 1954.
