= County of Chandos =

Chandos
- Cadastral division
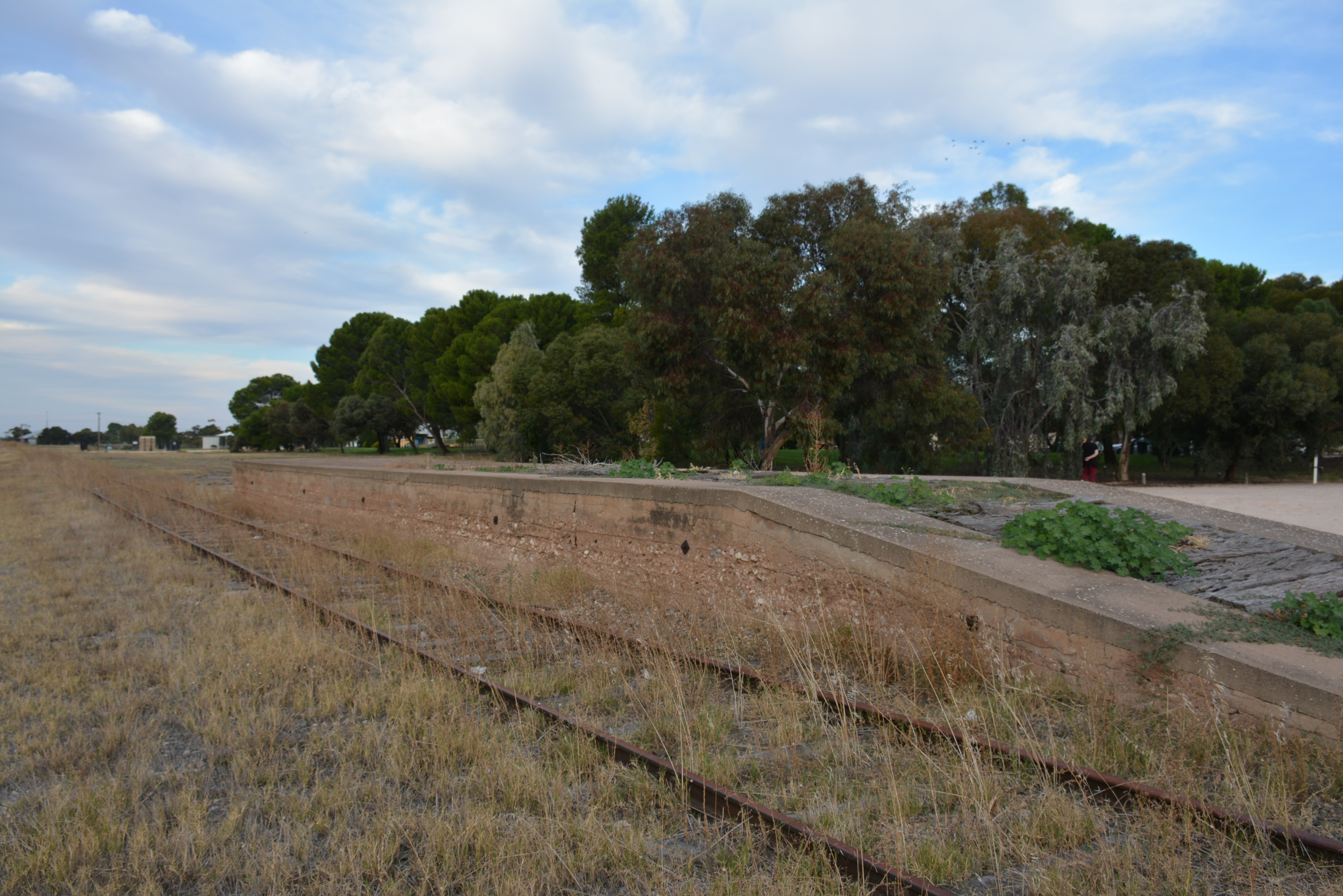
- Railway line at Pinnaroo on the county's eastern flank, facing east toward Ouyen

- Coordinates: 35.32°S 140.61°E
- Country: Australia
- State: South Australia
- LGA(s): Southern Mallee Karoonda East Murray Loxton Waikerie
- Established: 1893

Area
  - Total: 6,800 km^{2} (2,620 sq mi)
Lands administrative divisions around Chandos
Albert	Alfred	Millewa (Vic)
Buccleuch	Chandos	Weeah (Vic)
Cardwell	Buckingham	Lowan (Vic)

The County of Chandos is one of the 49 cadastral counties of South Australia. It was proclaimed in 1893 and named by Governor Kintore for the Duke of Buckingham and Chandos, Richard Temple-Nugent-Brydges-Chandos-Grenville who was appointed Secretary of State for the Colonies in 1867. It covers a large portion of the southern Mallee region, adjacent to the state border with Victoria in the state's south east.

The Pinnaroo railway line traverses the north of the county, passing from west to east from Parrakie through Pinnaroo into Victoria.

== Hundreds ==
The county is divided into the following 12 hundreds, with Ngarkat Conservation Park lying outside the gazetted hundreds along the southern border of the county.

In the north (from west to east):

- Hundred of Auld (Sandalwood)
- Hundred of Billiatt (Billiat)
- Hundred of Kingsford (Kringin, Peebinga, Karte)
- Hundred of Peebinga (Kringin, Peebinga, Karte)

In the centre (from west to east):

- Hundred of Cotton (Parrakie, Lameroo)
- Hundred of Bews (Lameroo)
- Hundred of Parilla (Parilla)
- Hundred of Pinnaroo (Pinnaroo)

In the south (from west to east):

- Hundred of Allenby (Parrakie, Lameroo)
- Hundred of Day ((Lameroo, Parilla))
- Hundred of Quirke (Pinnaroo)
- Hundred of Fisk (Ngarkat)
