= Hundred of Bews =

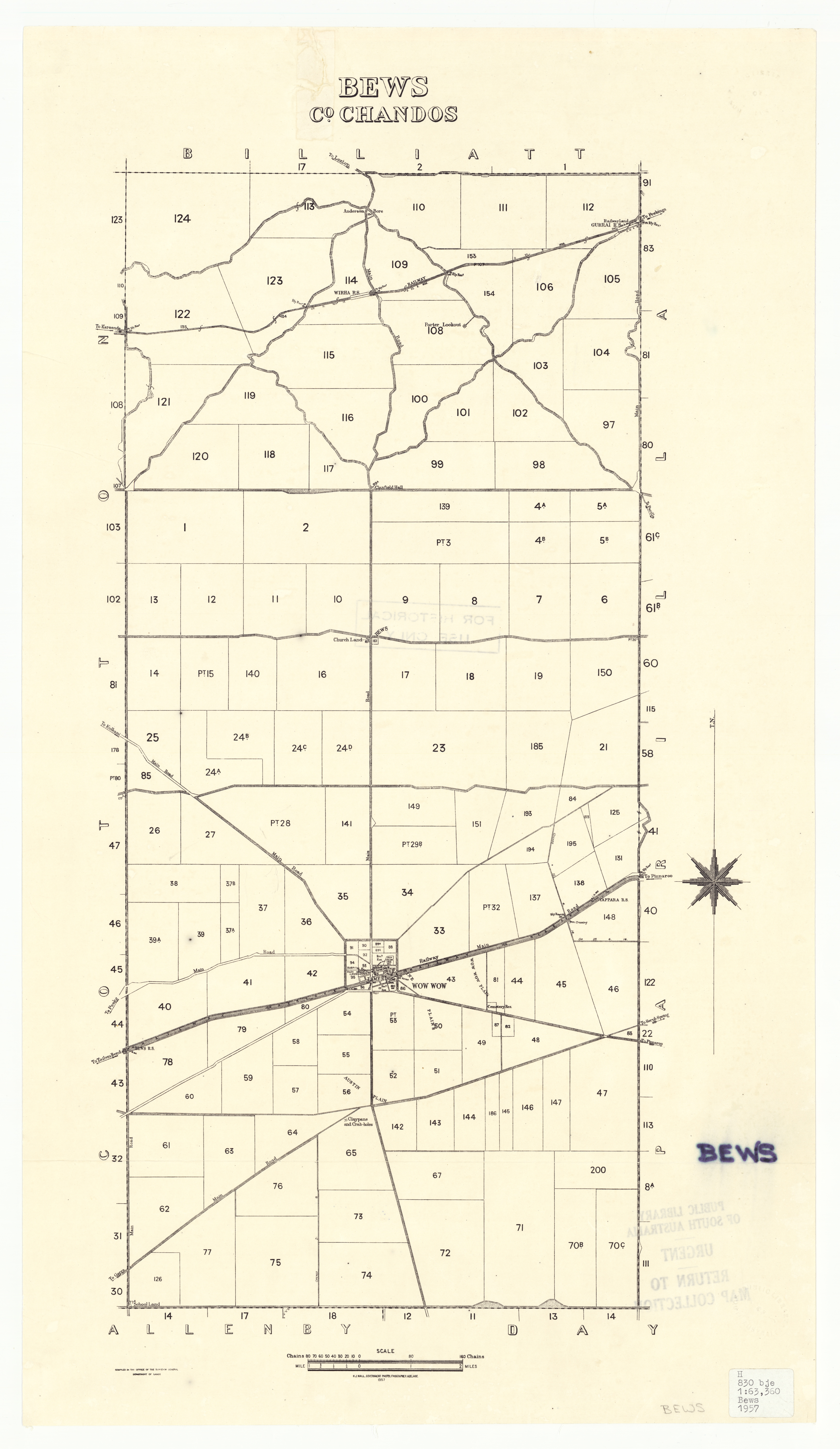
Hundred of Bews, 1957.

The Hundred of Bews is a hundred in the County of Chandos, South Australia, established in 1894.

The only towns in the hundred is Lameroo.

== History ==
The traditional owners of the land are the Ngargad Australian Aboriginal tribes. The explorer Edward John Eyre passed through the area during his 1840-1841 travels.
