= Karte Conservation Park =

Protected area in South Australia

- IUCN category Ia (strict nature reserve)
- Location within South Australia
- Location: South Australia
- Nearest city: Pinnaroo
- Coordinates: 35°05′16″S 140°42′30″E
- Area: 35.90 km^{2} (13.86 sq mi)
- Established: 4 September 1969
- Governing body: Department for Environment and Water

Karte Conservation Park (formerly Karte National Park) is a protected area located in the Australian state of South Australia in the localities of Karte and Parilla about 193 kilometres (120 mi) east of the state capital of Adelaide and about 26 kilometres (16 mi) north-west of the town of Pinnaroo.

The conservation park consists of crown land in sections 3, 4 and 10 in the cadastral unit of the Hundred of Kingsford and section 135 in the Hundred of Parilla. It acquired protected area status as the "Karte National Park" on 4 September 1969 by proclamation under the National Parks Act 1966. On 27 April 1972, it was reconstituted as the Karte Conservation Park upon the proclamation of the National Parks and Wildlife Act 1972. Land in section 10 of the Hundred of Kingsford was added on 7 December 1972 and in Section 135 of the Hundred of Parilla was added on 17 June 1976. As of 2016, it covered an area of 35.90 square kilometres (13.86 sq mi).

In 1980, it was described as follows:

This park contains a discrete area of steep, irregular sand dunes supporting very mature mallee vegetation. The park provides habitat for numerous mallee species including the threatened mallee fowl… Dominant vegetation is tall, dense Eucalyptus incrassata mallee with Melaleuca lanceolata, M. uncinate and Callitris verrucosa. This park has been minimally disturbed despite disturbed natural and cultural surrounds. However pest mammals including the fox, rabbit and house mouse are present. The park has remained unburnt for a considerable time.

The conservation park is classified as an IUCN Category Ia protected area. In 1980, it was listed on the now-defunct Register of the National Estate.

== See also ==
- Protected areas of South Australia
