= Karte, South Australia =

Karte South Australia
- Coordinates: 35°03′27″S 140°41′54″E
- Population: 32 (SAL 2021)
- Established: 8 June 1916 (town); 12 August 1999 (locality)
- Postcode(s): 5307
- Elevation: 85 m (279 ft)(railway station)
- Time zone: ACST (UTC+9:30)
  - Summer (DST): ACST (UTC+10:30)
- Location: 192 km (119 mi) E of Adelaide; 35 km (22 mi) NE of Lameroo; 30 km (19 mi) NW of Pinnaroo
- LGA(s): Southern Mallee District Council
- Region: Murray and Mallee
- County: Chandos
- State electorate(s): Hammond
- Federal division(s): Barker
Mean max temp	Mean min temp	Annual rainfall
22.9 °C; 73 °F	8.8 °C; 48 °F	382.3 mm 15.1 in
Suburbs around Karte:
Billiatt	Billiatt; Kringin; Peebinga	Victoria
Billiatt; Lameroo	Karte	Victoria
Lameroo	Parilla; Pinnaroo	Victoria
- Footnotes: Locations; Adjoining localities

Karte is a town and a locality in the Australian state of South Australia located in the state’s east about 192 kilometres (119 mi) east of the state capital of Adelaide, about 30 kilometres (19 mi) north-west of the municipal seat of Pinnaroo and about 35 kilometres (22 mi) north-east of the town of Lameroo.

The town was named after the railway station which was a stop on the Peebinga railway line and whose name is derived from an aboriginal word mean “a low thick scrub. The Peebinga railway line was closed in 1990.

The government town of Karte was proclaimed on 8 June 1916 on land in the cadastral unit of the Hundred of Kingsford to the immediate north-west of the Karte Railway Station. ” The boundaries for the locality were created on 12 August 1999 and includes the site of the government town of Karte which is located in its south-west immediately north of the Karte Conservation Park.

Land use within the locality is mainly concerned with “primary production” while some land in its south-west and north is occupied respectively by the Karte and Peebinga Conservation Parks and is zoned for “conservation”.

Karte is located within the federal division of Barker, the state electoral district of Hammond and the local government area of the Southern Mallee District Council.
