= Peake railway station, South Australia =

Former railway station in South Australia, Australia

Peake
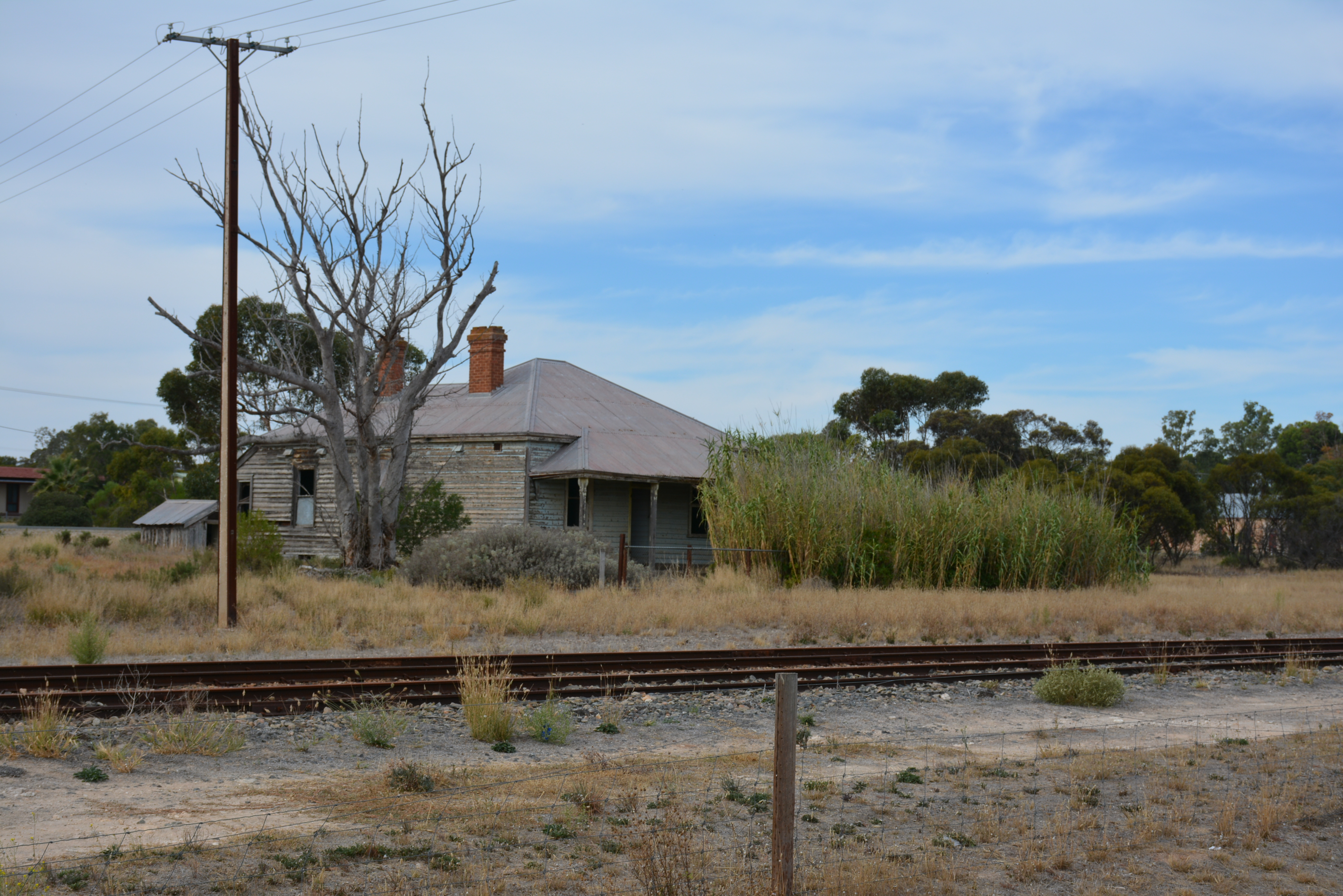
- The former station master's house at Peake (2017)

General information
- Location: Railway Terrace, Peake, South Australia
- Coordinates: 35.3657842750745°S 139.9526726109763°E
- Operator: South Australian Railways
- Line: Pinnaroo line
- Distance: 147 kilometres from Adelaide
- Platforms: 1
- Tracks: 1

Construction
- Structure type: Ground

Other information
- Status: Demolished

History
- Closed: 1968

Services
Preceding station	Aurizon	Following station
Sherlock towards Adelaide	Pinnaroo railway line, South Australia	Geranium towards Panitya
Location

Peake railway station was located on the Pinnaroo railway line. It served the town of Peake, South Australia.

== History ==
It is unclear when the station opened. It was a refreshment station on the line and was named after Archibald Henry Peake, the governor of South Australia at that time. The station closed to regular passengers in 1968 and the line became disused in July 2015.
