= Hundred of Pinnaroo =

Coordinates: 35°15′27″S 140°52′20″E

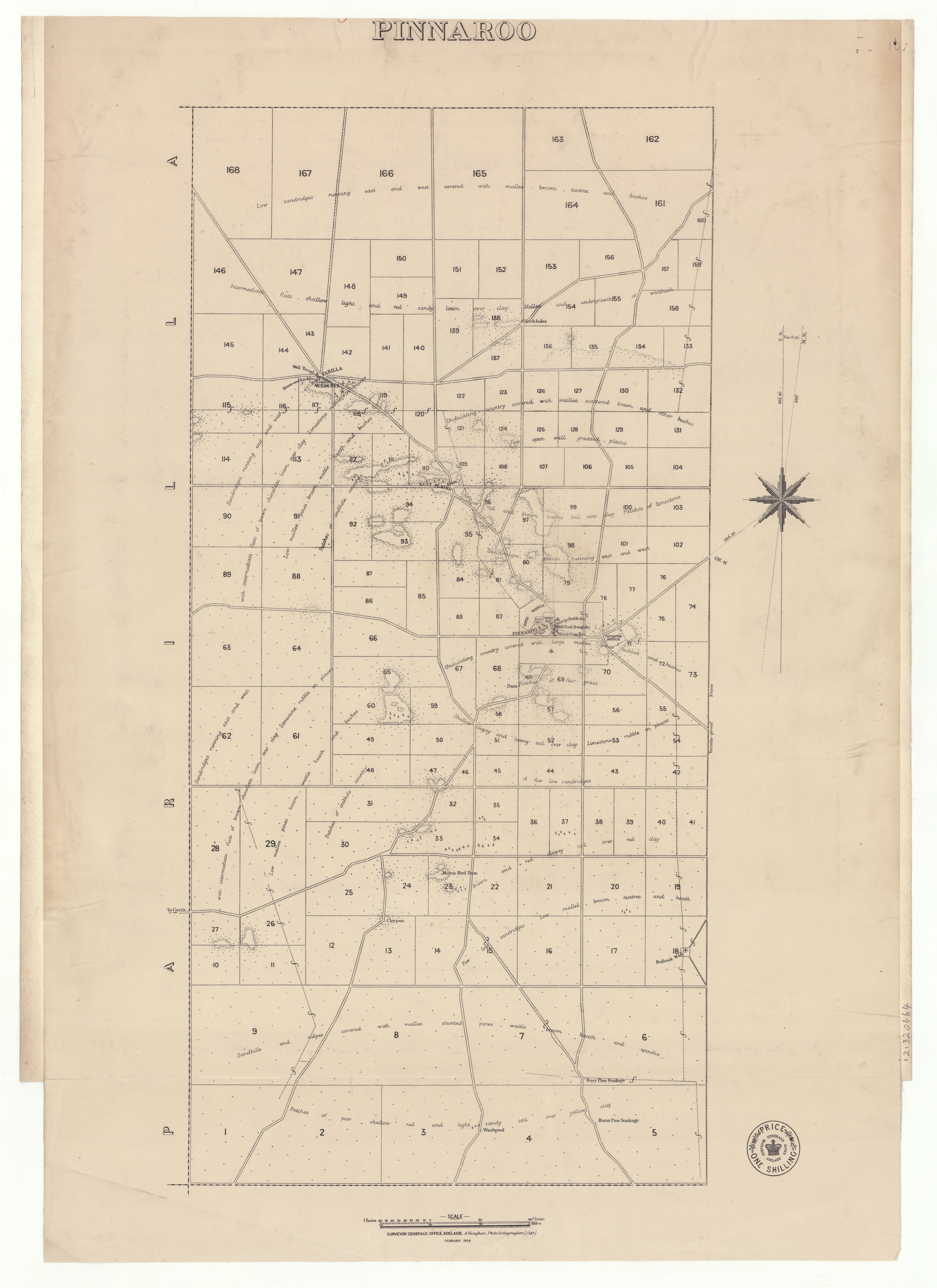
Cadastral map of the Hundred of Pinnaroo in 1895

The Hundred of Pinnaroo is a Hundred in the County of Chandos in South Australia. The hundred is in the Murray Mallee region of South Australia near the border with Victoria, Australia.

The centre of the hundred is Pinnaroo. The railway arrived in the area in 1906.
