= Hundred of Auld =

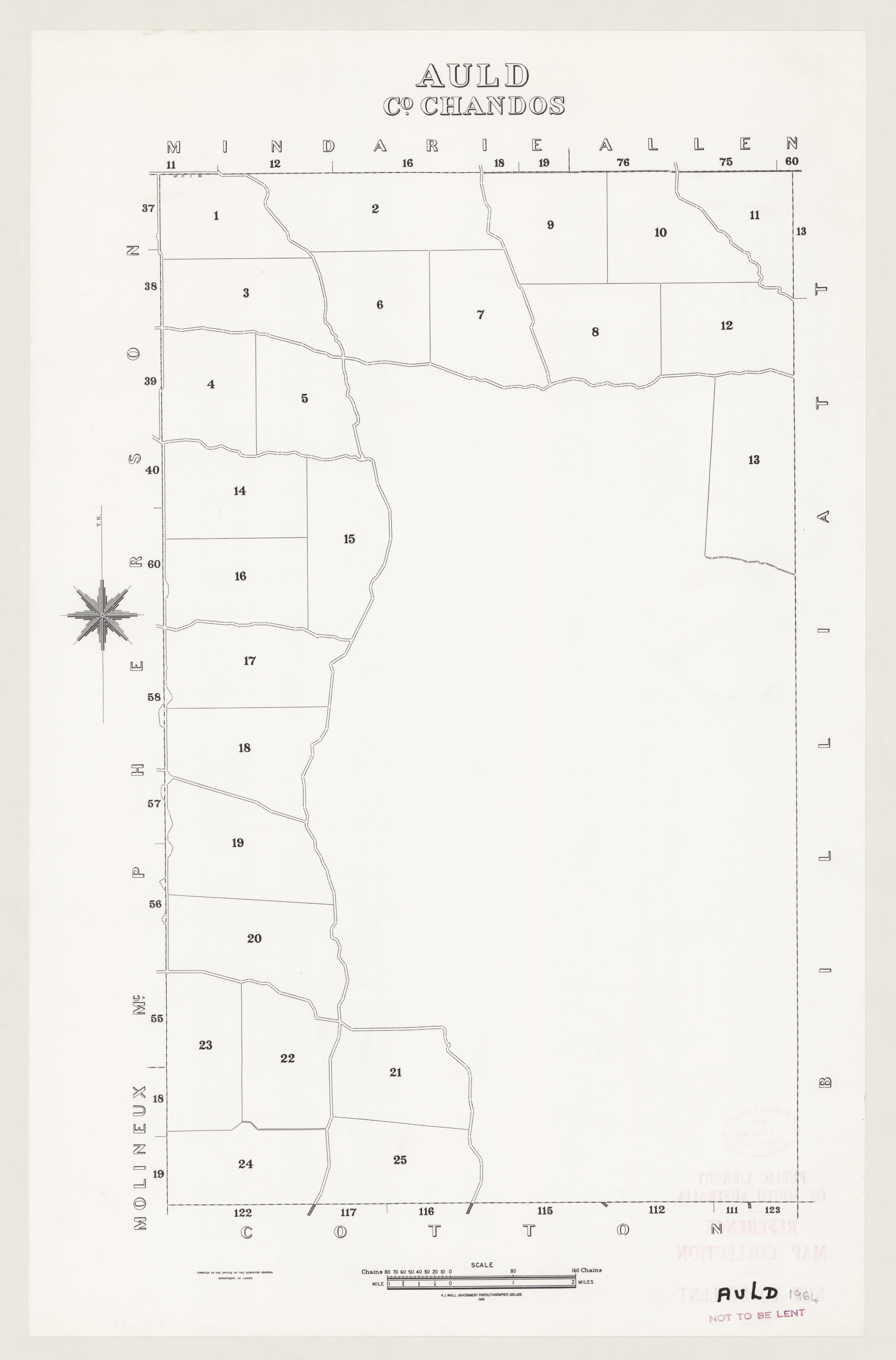
The Hundred of Auld in 1964.

The Hundred of Auld, is a hundred in the County of Chandos, South Australia.

== History ==
The traditional owners of the Hundred of Auld are the Ngargad Australian Aboriginal tribes. The hundred was founded in 1912.
