= Hundred of Day =

The Hundred of Day is a hundred in the County of Chandos, South Australia, proclaimed on 24 October 1929, and named after Theodore Ernest Day.
