= Pinnaroo railway line =

The Pinnaroo railway line may refer to:

- the Pinnaroo railway line, South Australia from Tailem Bend
- the Pinnaroo railway line, Victoria from Ouyen
- the entire line from Tailem Bend to Ouyen across the state border
