= Hundred of Parilla =

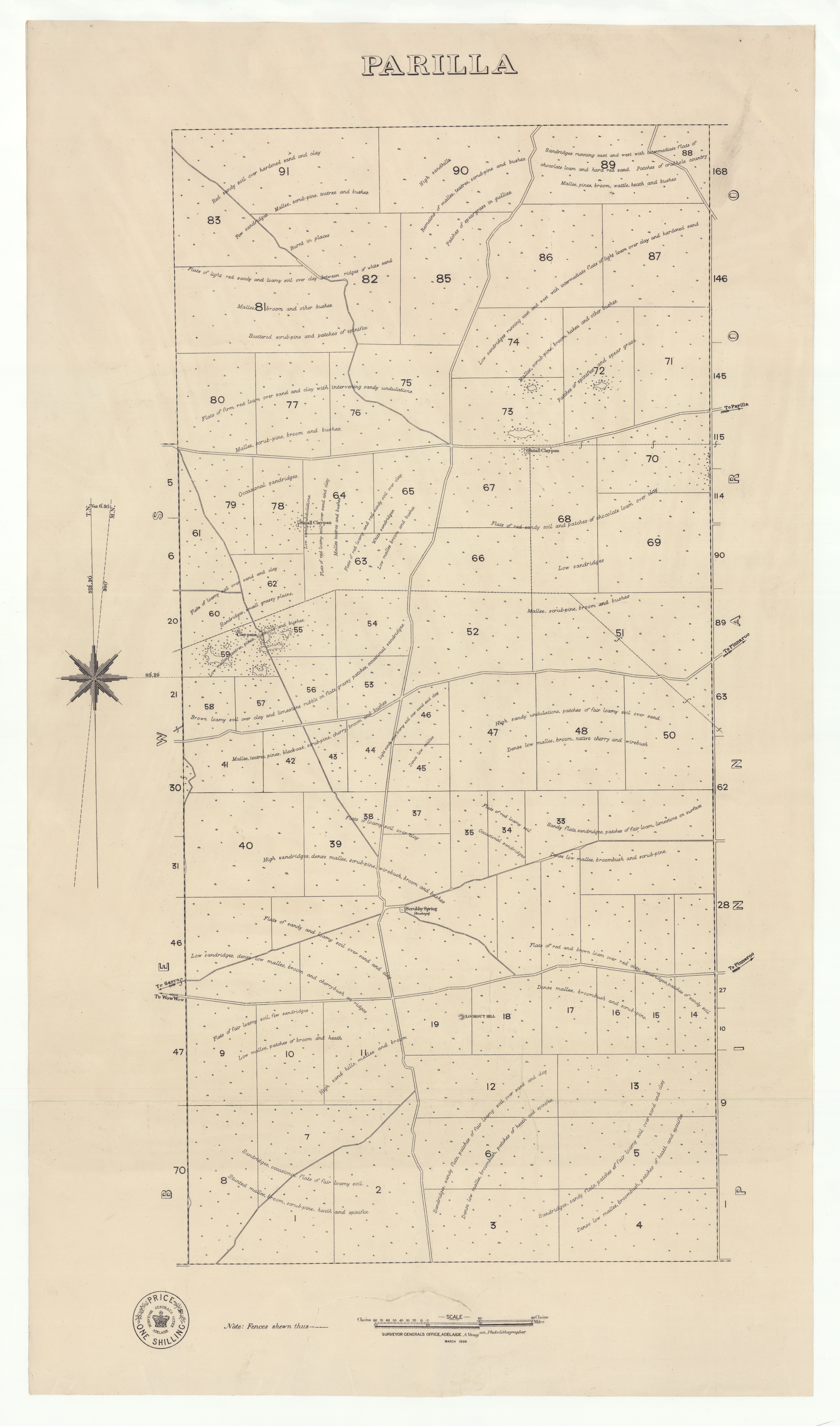
Hundred of Parilla, 1898

The Hundred of Parilla is a hundred within the County of Chandos, South Australia. It was established in 1894.

== History ==
The traditional owners of the lands are the Ngargad Australian Aboriginal tribes.

== See also ==
- Lands administrative divisions of South Australia
