= Ngarkat =

Recorded title of a tribal group from South Australia

The Ngarkat is a recorded title of a tribal group from South Australia. The Ngarkat lands had linked the mallee peoples of Victoria and South Australia to the river peoples of the Murray River Murraylands. Ngarkat language has been loosely grouped with Peramangk language though not by linguists, and the grouping was perhaps partly owed to the co-ownership of lands in both the Ninety Mile Desert and Echunga by John Barton Hack, and partly to the occasional meeting of tribes. The language of the Ngarkat was recorded as being Boraipur by Ryan in recent times though sources were not given, while it may yet be telling that the citing work concerns Mallee peoples to the east. The language may have been midway between that of mallee peoples to the east, and that of peoples to the west recorded by Teichelmann and Schurman. It is known that songlines linked the Coorong to the Mallee regions, hence went through Ngarkat land. It is also known that Ngarkat people did meet regularly with tribes to the east, at sites along the Murray.

== Country ==
The Ngarkat's traditional lands have been estimated by Norman Tindale to have extended over some 8,700 square miles (23,000 km^{2}) of the Mallee scrub belt lying east of the Murray River. They took in Alawoona south as far as Pinnaroo, Taunta, Keith, Tintinara, and Coonalpyn. Their eastern boundaries reached Tatiara and about Murrayville (Note: Ronald Berndt placed them on the western side of Lake Alexandrina opposite the Jarildekald on the eastern banks) Kimber argued that Tindale had pushed the Ngarkat territorial extension into lands properly possessed by the Wotjobaluk to their east, and takes the Jackegilbrab around Bordertown as belonging to the latter, but a distinct tribe.

== Ecology ==
The Ngarkat lived on a largely waterless karst plateau. Rainfall varies from 8 inches in the north to 18 in the south. Winters can be freezing, while temperatures could hit 118 °F (48 °C) in summer, though averaging 100 °F (38 °C). In no part of the land was there a single perennial stream; water was found in soakages, by working mallee roots or culling whatever hollow trees retained, or rock cleavages held. Waterskins were manufactured from kangaroo and wallaby hides.

The lack of surface water determined much of their lifestyle. Neighbouring tribes such as the Warki, Jarildekald, and Portaulun lived in areas where they could hunt and trap animals, fish and ducks, and such resources enabled a more settled tribal existence. The Ngarkat, conversely, were an ever-shifting nomadic people, lacking even a fixed nomenclature for the mallee groves where they pitched camp and drew water from the mallee roots. The few stable points of return, which allowed a seasonal living base, were named and the lore of the ancestral beings of each clan developed only in such places.

In periods of severe drought the Ngarkat withdrew to the Devon Downs Rock-shelter, (Note: Devon Downs Rock Shelter was to become the first site of an Australian archaeological dig. It was conducted by Norman Tindale and Herbert Hale in 1929. Their stratification analysis established a seminal framework for the periodization of habitative sequences on the Australian continent.) called Ngautngaut, on the Murray River, to which they were permitted access by a track down the cliff. In local mythology this Ngautngaut was a Being who dwelt in the mallee scrubland, who had been murdered when he knelt down on his knees to slake his thirst at a water-hole. (Note: Tindale cites Mathews, 1904 (Gr. 6452) p. 367. This is a slight error: the reference should be G6451) (Note: Ngautngaut, of the mythical ngurumba-nguttya people, murdered blacks to suck their blood. He was immune to injury, save for one part of his body: his Achilles’ heel was his tongue. The twin Brambambulaty brothers of northwestern Victorian mythology set up a trap to kill him. They created a spring at one of his lurking places, Gurabo, and stuck in the water a sharpened legbone from a kangaroo. Then they assumed the form of two dead trees nearby. Coming to the site, Ngautngaut could sense their presence, and shook the trunks, but both appeared to be rotting, Still uneasy, he left, and the trees "sang" a duet to induce him to be more thirsty. Three times the scene repeated itself. Then he bent down almost touching the surface of the water with his mouth, but again, wary, several times he withdrew. Finally, reassured, he knelt and drank, and the shaft of bone shot up and drilled him through the tongue, killing him.)

== Social organization ==
The Ngarkat subtribal units were widely dispersed given the scarcity of water and were divided into six hordes, according to an old Tatiara informant: (Note: Yilgoonin gave testimony to a police trooper, Humphries, stationed at Bordertown. He named the Ngarkat "Jackegilbrab", which Tindale takes as a section.)

- Kooinkill
- Wirriga
- Chala
- Camiagiiigara
- Niall
- Munkoora

== Material culture ==
The Ngarkat faced a particular problem in making implements, millstones, hammers and axes, since suitable stone or rock materials were quite rare in their area. Onsets of highly arid weather, on draining soakages, yield evidence, aside from skeletons, of tools fashioned from chert, quartzite and jasp-opal.

Despite its arid inhospitable terrain, Ngarkat territory was crisscrossed by trade routes, from Lake Hindmarsh to Bordertown, from Nhill to Murrayville and Pinnaroo, from the Wirrurgren Plain north of Lake Albacutya through Pinnaroo country to the Murray Bridge area. The items bartered along these trails were things like yabbyclaw necklaces, pipe clay, red ochre, diorite stone axes, and the like.

== Relations with other tribes ==
The Ngarkat, who often had to seek water on other tribal lands, had difficult relations with several tribes. One aetiological legend, according to the Ngarrindjeri elder Matt Rigney, explains the pink waters of Lake Bumbunga, often called by settlers "Pink Lake", as the outcome of a bloody battle between the Ngarrindjeri and the Ngarkat which left many slain warriors in its waters.

Their lands were considered in surrounding tribal lore as dangerous and "legends of fear" circulated concerning its proneness to hurricanes, or its putative infestation by malign spirits. Its Tatiara denizens were said to prey on human flesh, though ritual cannibalism was also attested among many other tribes, and was not uncommon. had the Ngarkat practised it, in times of extreme scarcity of food, they would not have been an exception.

== History of contact ==
The explorer Edward Eyre passed through Ngarkat lands during his 1840-1841 travels. He wrote of the tribe (calling them Arkatko (Note: "Eyre being tone deaf to initial ng heard the tribal name as Arkatko.")) that they shared similar "dialects" but were mutually unintelligible unless a common third dialect was used to bridge misunderstandings. (Note: In others the dialects are so totally unlike one another, that natives, meeting upon opposite sides of a river, cannot speak to or understand a word of what each other say, except through the medium of a third language, namely that spoken by the natives of the river itself, and which is totally unlike either of the other two. This is the case at Moorunde, where three different dialects meet, the Yakkumban, or dialect spoken by the Paritke tribe, or natives inhabiting the scrub to the west and north-west of the Murray. The Boraipar or language of the Arkatko tribe, who inhabit the scrub to the east of the Murray, and the Aiawong or river dialect, extending, with slight variations, from the junction of the Murray and Lake Alexandrina to the Darling)

According to Richard Glyn Kimber only 50 of the Jackegilbrab horde survived into the mid-1840s, attributing the decline to disease. It has also been suggested that many of the Ngarkat were massacred though it is unclear by who. A burial site of 70 skeletons was documented at a soak in the Lameroo district by early pioneers.

The tribal name has been restored and conserved in the South Australian landscape by the establishment of a locality called Ngarkat, and by setting aside part of its traditional land as the Ngarkat Conservation Park.

== Alternative names ==
- Ngerget
- Ngarkato
- Arkatko
- Boraipar (language name)
- Baripung (barip means "man")
- Boripar, Booripung
- Tatiari (regional name for mallee desert)
- Thatiari (general term)
- Duwinbarap (eastern term barap = man)
- Doenbauraket
- Tjakulprap (southeastern term parap, a form of barab, meaning "man")
- Jakalbarap, Jackalbarap
- Jacke-gilbrab
- Ngalundji (a name for language)
- Nalunghee
- Wularuki (name for southwestern group)

== Tribal exonyms ==
- Ngeruketi (Maraura term)
- Ratarapa (Nganguruku term)
- Mangkarupi (Jarildekalde term)
- Merkani/Merkanie (Jaralde and Tangane term, means "enemy")
- Jakel-baluk (Wotjobaluk term)
- Baine Hill tribe (horde around Lameroo)

== Sources ==
- Berndt, R. M. (December 1940). "Some Aspects of Jaralde Culture, South Australia". Oceania. 11 (2): 164–185. doi:10.1002/j.1834-4461.1940.tb00283.x. JSTOR 40327890.
- Eyre, Edward John (1845). Journals of expeditions of discovery into central Australia, and overland from Adelaide to King George's Sound, in the years 1840-1 (PDF). Vol. 2. London: T. and W. Boone.
- Keast, Allen (2013). Biogeography and Ecology in Australia. Springer. ISBN 978-9-401-76295-3.
- Kimber, Richard Glyn (28 July 1969). "Ngarkat: An Extinct Tribe of Mallee Aborigines" (PDF). Journal of the Anthropological Society of South Australia. 7 (6): 2–5.
- Lower-Eskelson, Kylie (2014). "Australia". In Carver, Martin; Gaydarska, Bisserka; Montón-Subías, Sandra (eds.). Field Archaeology from Around the World: Ideas and Approaches. Springer. pp. 224–226. ISBN 978-3-319-09819-7.
- Mathews, R. H. (1904). "Ethnological notes on the Aboriginal tribes of New South Wales and Victoria". Journal and Proceedings of the Royal Society of New South Wales. 38 (Part I): 203–381. doi:10.5962/p.359439.
- Smith, M. A. (October 1982). "Devon Downs Reconsidered: Changes in Site Use at a Lower Murray Valley Rockshelter". Archaeology in Oceania. 17 (3): 109–116. doi:10.1002/j.1834-4453.1982.tb00052.x. JSTOR 40386597.
- Taplin, George (1879). Folklore, manners, customs and languages of the South Australian aborigines (PDF). Adelaide: E Spiller, Acting Government Printer.
- Tindale, Norman Barnett (1974). "Ngarkat (SA)". Aboriginal Tribes of Australia: Their Terrain, Environmental Controls, Distribution, Limits, and Proper Names. Australian National University Press. ISBN 978-0-708-10741-6.
- Weir, Jessica K. (2009). Murray River Country: An Ecological Dialogue with Traditional Owners. Aboriginal Studies Press. ISBN 978-0-855-75678-9.
