= Ngarkat, South Australia =

Unpopulated region of South Australia

Ngarkat South Australia

- Coordinates: 35°37′37″S 140°38′05″E
- Population: 0 (2016 census)
- Established: 1999
- Postcode(s): 5302
- Time zone: ACST (UTC+9:30)
  - Summer (DST): ACST (UTC+10:30)
- Location: 227 km (141 mi) south-east of Adelaide; 75 km (47 mi) north of Bordertown; 50 km (31 mi) south-west of Pinnaroo
- LGA(s): Coorong District Council; Tatiara District Council; Southern Mallee District Council
- Region: Limestone Coast; Murray Mallee
- County: Buckingham; Chandos "outside of counties"
- State electorate(s): Chaffey; MacKillop
- Federal division(s): Barker
Mean max temp	Mean min temp	Annual rainfall
23.4 °C; 74 °F	8.8 °C; 48 °F	310.3 mm 12.2 in
Suburbs around Ngarkat:
Lameroo; Parrakie	Lameroo; Parilla; Pinnaroo	Victoria
Parrakie; Tintinara	Ngarkat	Victoria
Coombe	Coombe; Makin; McCallum; Shaugh	Victoria
- Footnotes: Locations; Adjoining localities

Ngarkat is a locality in the Australian state of South Australia located in the south-east of the state at the border with the state of Victoria in both the Murray Mallee and the Limestone Coast regions about 227 kilometres (141 miles) south east of the state capital of Adelaide.

Its boundaries were created firstly in August 1999 for the part in the Southern Mallee District Council followed by the part in the Tatiara District Council during March 2000 and finally by the part in the Coorong District Council during August 2000. Its name is derived from the Ngarkat Conservation Park.

The principal land use within the locality is conservation with the majority of the land being located in the Ngarkat Conservation Park with the exception of a parcel of land between the Ngarkat Highway and the Victorian border within the Tatiara District Council.

The 2016 Australian census which was conducted in August 2016, reports that Ngarkat had a population of zero.

Ngarkat is located within the federal Division of Barker, the state electoral districts of Chaffey and Mackillop, and the local government areas of the Coorong District Council, the Tatiara District Council and the Southern Mallee District Council.

== See also ==
- Mount Rescue Conservation Park
- Mount Shaugh Conservation Park
