= District Council of Lameroo =

Coordinates: 34°55′15″S 140°31′02″E

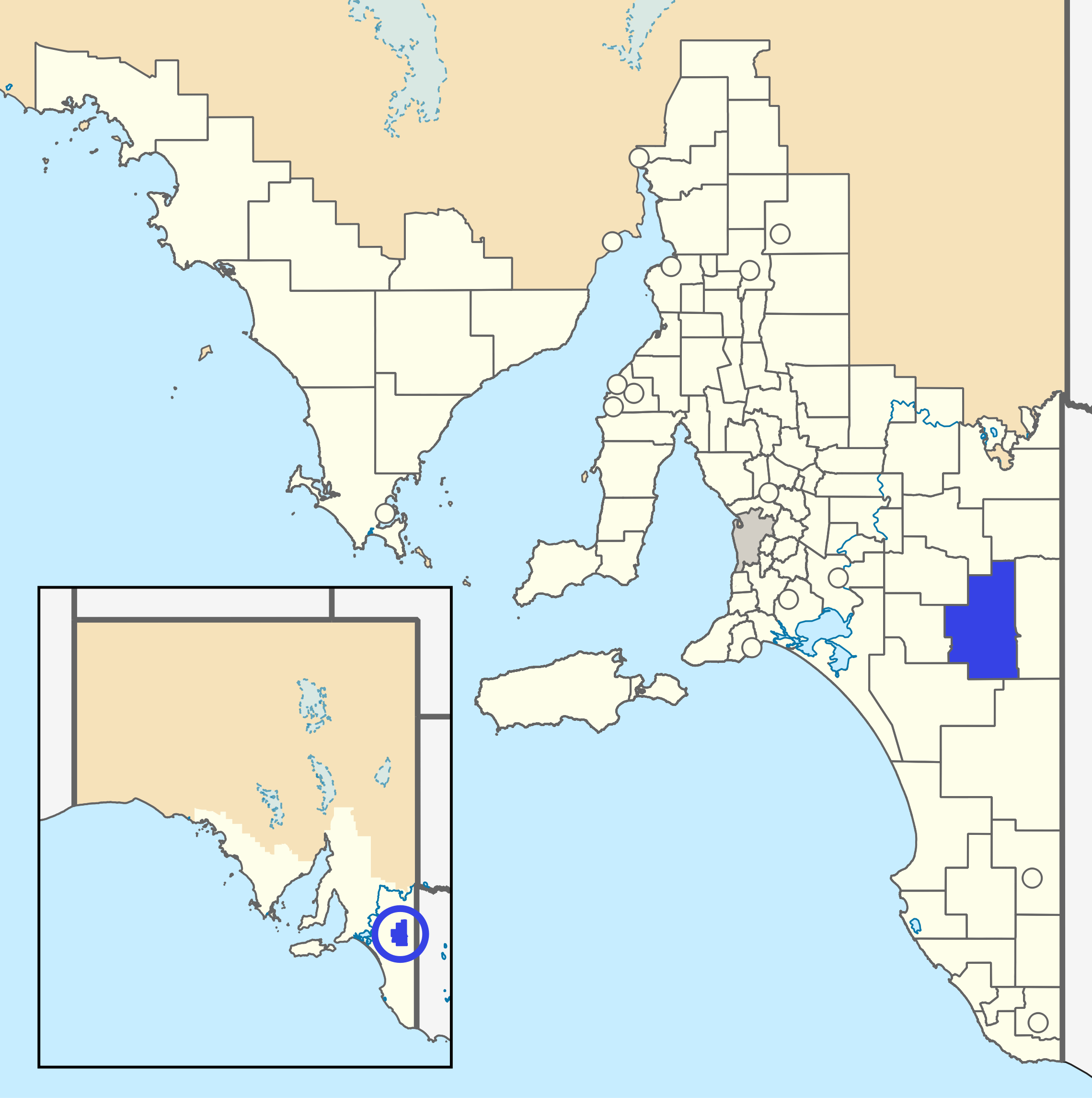
The District Council of Lameroo as it was prior to disestablishment (blue)

The District Council of Lameroo was a local government area in South Australia from 1908 until 1997. For the first eleven years of the council's history it was known as District Council of Pinnaroo, not to be confused with its sister, the District Council of Pinnaroo (1913–1997) which was initially called Pinnaroo East council and also based in the town of Lameroo until 1919. Lameroo and Pinnaroo councils were amalgamated in 1997 to create the District Council of Southern Mallee.

== History ==
The District Council of Pinnaroo was established 1908 and was based in Lameroo. It governed both the towns of Lameroo and Pinnaroo and their surroundings. In 1913, the council split, with the District Council of Pinnaroo continuing govern the Lameroo township's west and the new District Council of Pinnaroo East governing the town's east as well as Pinnaroo. Both councils were renamed in 1919 with the council based in Lameroo becoming the District Council of Lameroo and Pinnaroo East becoming the District Council of Pinnaroo. With a statewide reduction of local government areas in 1997, the two councils merged and the combined council is now known as the Southern Mallee District Council.
