= Southern Mallee District Council =

Coordinates: 35.26°S 140.908611°E

- Local government area
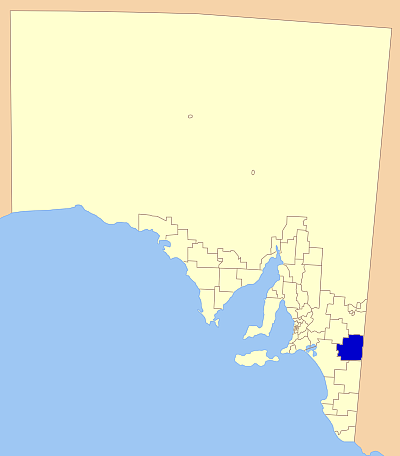
- The position of Southern Mallee District Council in SA.

- Interactive map of Southern Mallee District Council
- Country: Australia
- State: South Australia
- Region: Murray and Mallee
- Established: 23 January 1997

Government
  - Mayor: Ron Valentine
  - State electorate: MacKillop
  - Federal division: Barker

Area
  - Total: 5,700 km^{2} (2,200 sq mi)

Population
  - Total: 1,979 (LGA 2021)
  - Density: 0.35/km^{2} (0.91/sq mi)
- Website: Southern Mallee District Council
LGAs around Southern Mallee District Council
Karoonda East Murray	Loxton Waikerie
Coorong	Southern Mallee District Council	West Wimmera (Vic)
Coorong	Tatiara

The Southern Mallee District Council is a local government area in the Murray and Mallee region of South Australia. The council offices are in Pinnaroo and Lameroo. It was established on 23 January 1997 when the District Council of Lameroo and District Council of Pinnaroo agreed to merge. Their predecessors date from 1908.

The largest towns are Lameroo and Pinnaroo; the council also includes the localities of Geranium, Karte, Parilla and Parrakie, and parts of Jabuk and Ngarkat.

== Council ==
Ward	Councillor	Notes
Unsubdivided	Luke Kennedy	
Unsubdivided	Campbell Michell	
Unsubdivided	Trevor Pocock	
Unsubdivided	Chris Mead	Deputy Mayor
Unsubdivided	Ron Valentine	Mayor
Unsubdivided	Neville Pfeiffer	
Unsubdivided	David Smith	
