= Lameroo Beach =

Beach in central Darwin in Northern Territory of Australia

Coordinates: 12.4652°S 130.8386°E

Lameroo Beach is a small beach located off the esplanade in central Darwin in the Northern Territory of Australia. It was the location of the town's historic baths between 1922 and 1974. The name for Lameroo Beach comes from a corrupted interpretation of the nearby Aboriginal site Damoe-Ra, which means "eye" or "spring" in Larrakia. which was also a place of meaning to the larrakia tribe. The old larrakia people would canoe from Cox peninsula to Lameroo beach and back during time's of ceremonies and other important events

== Lameroo Baths ==
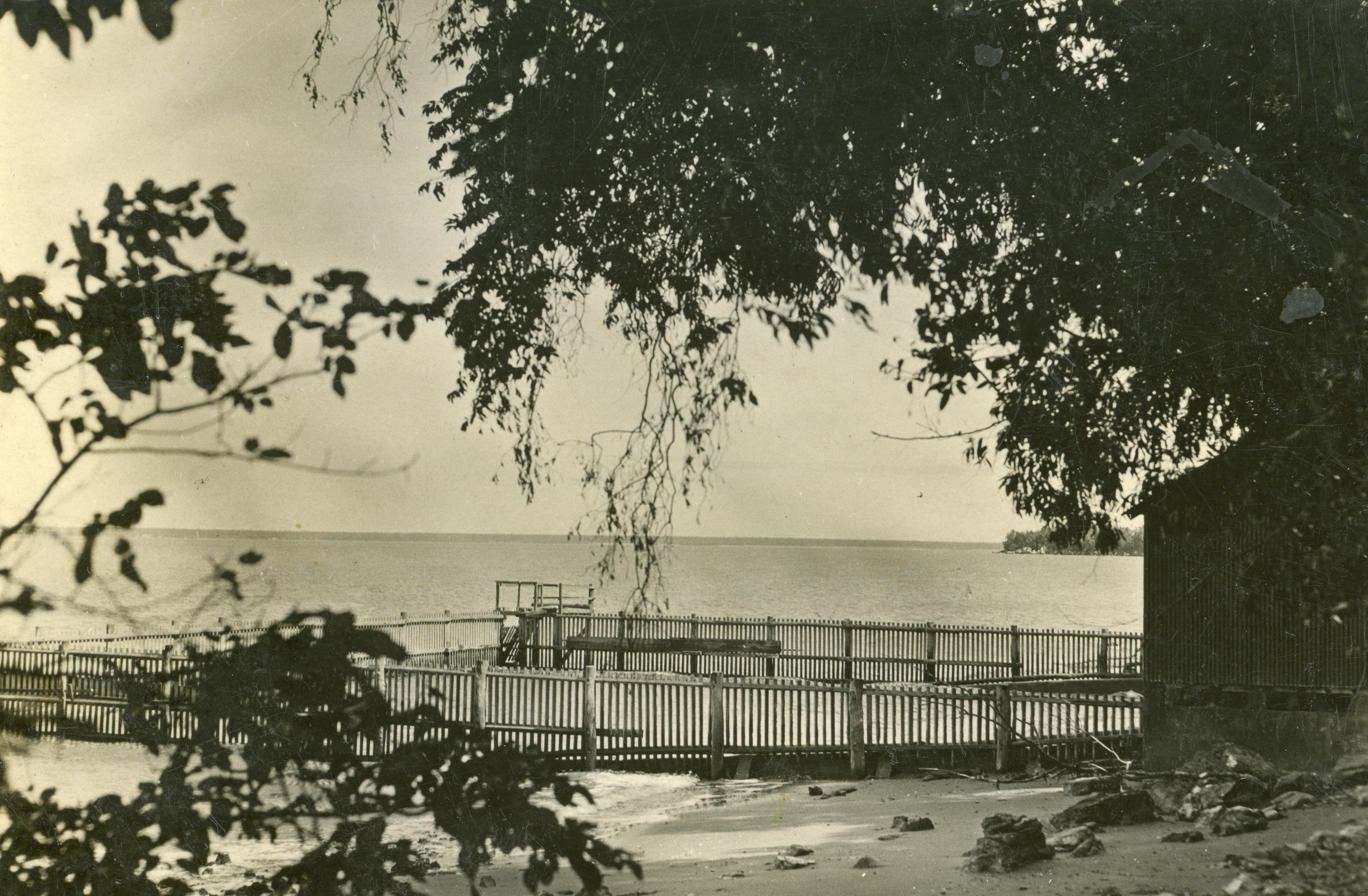
Lameroo Baths, Darwin

Lameroo Baths were the second ocean baths built in Darwin. The first, built near Fort Hill in 1880, were damaged in a cyclone. The growing popularity of swimming at Lameroo Beach made it an obvious choice for the construction of new baths in central Darwin. It was described at times as a "miniature Manly". According to the Northern Standard; "...that the Town Council were wise in their decision to build the baths on Lameroo Beach is becoming more evident every day particularly on Sundays when the population of Darwin are to be found on the beach."

The Lameroo Baths were officially opened on 14 May 1922 by Mayor, J. F. Burton. The opening was held on a Saturday afternoon in the "presence of a good number of spectators". The baths cost £2,000 to construct. This was considered an enormously costly venture for the time. It was the only swimming pool in Darwin during the early to mid 1900s, as there were no private swimming pools in Darwin until 1955.

Regular swimming carnivals were held at Lameroo Baths, many of which were organised by the Darwin Amateur Swimming Club. A long-time Darwin resident recalled that the Lameroo Baths were surrounded by "a cement wall, topped by palings and with the bathing sheds at the end"

There were numerous shark and crocodile sightings at the beach, but that didn't curb its popularity as a swimming spot.

There were a number of drownings at Lameroo Beach, including Nicholas Callas in 1928, and Joseph Byrne from the North Australian Workers Union in 1950.

By the 1950s, the baths were badly neglected. The Darwin City Council had instead planned for the construction of new swimming pool. They were eventually completely destroyed during Cyclone Tracy in 1974.

== Lameroo Hippies ==
Lameroo Beach became a popular location for hippies. In 1966 the East Point Trustees removed illegal campers from East Point Reserve. A number of these campers moved to Lameroo Beach.

Between 1969 and 1974 the number of people camping on Lameroo Beach grew to as high as 400 people. The campers were depicted in the media as a nuisance:

The presence of the hippies has been a constant irritation to Darwin residents. Many hippies have been convicted of shoplifting, vacancy, possession of marihuana and pep pills and indecent exposure – nude swimming.

By 1974, Darwin City Council were prosecuting campers that chose to stay on the Beach as trespassers. In February 1974 about 20 campers were forced from the beach by police and 13 tree houses were burned by council inspectors. Many of the campers dispersed to sites further along the foreshore, with some later returning to Lameroo Beach. It was one of the early television stories broadcast from Darwin.

The camp was destroyed during Cyclone Tracy in 1974. Campers returned to Lameroo Beach after the cyclone. As part of the reconstruction plans, Darwin City Council passed legislation making it illegal to camp on the Darwin foreshores, including Lameroo Beach citing the possibility of storm surge.

== See also ==
- Ocean pools in Australia
