= Parrakie, South Australia =

Parrakie
- Town
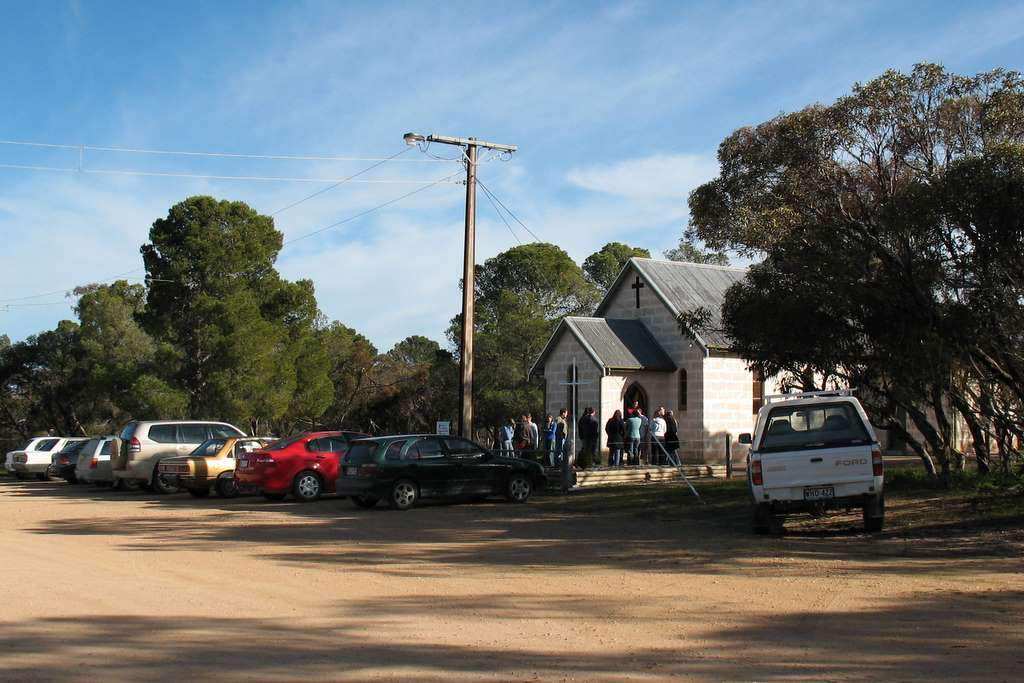
- Parrakie Lutheran Church on Price Street

- Coordinates: 35°22′56″S 140°14′57″E
- Country: Australia
- State: South Australia
- Region: Murray and Mallee
- LGA: Southern Mallee District Council
- Location: 26 km (16 mi) W of Lameroo
- Established: 20 June 1907 (town); 12 August 1999 (locality)

Government
  - State electorate: Hammond
  - Federal division: Barker
- Elevation (railway station): 81 m (266 ft)

Population
  - Total: 78 (SAL 2021)
- Time zone: UTC+9:30 (ACST)
  - Summer (DST): UTC+10:30 (ACST)
- Postcode: 5301
- County: Buccleuch; Chandos
- Mean max temp: 22.9 °C (73.2 °F)
- Mean min temp: 8.8 °C (47.8 °F)
- Annual rainfall: 382.3 mm (15.05 in)
Localities around Parrakie
| | Marama |
| Geranium | Parrakie | Lameroo |
| Coonalpyn | Tintinara | Ngarkat |

Parrakie, South Australia is a small town on the Mallee Highway and Pinnaroo railway line approximately 26 kilometres west of Lameroo. The name is derived from the Aboriginal word perki which means cave or limestone sink hole. The town was surveyed in 1907.

The town is surrounded by large properties growing mostly cereal grains and livestock.

There is a Lutheran Church, town hall, post office and payphone. There is also a cricket club and tennis courts on the other side of the railway line, south of the town. A primary school opened in 1910 and closed in 1964.

Parrakie is located within the federal division of Barker, the state electoral district of Hammond and the local government area of the Southern Mallee District Council.
