= Lameroo =

- Town
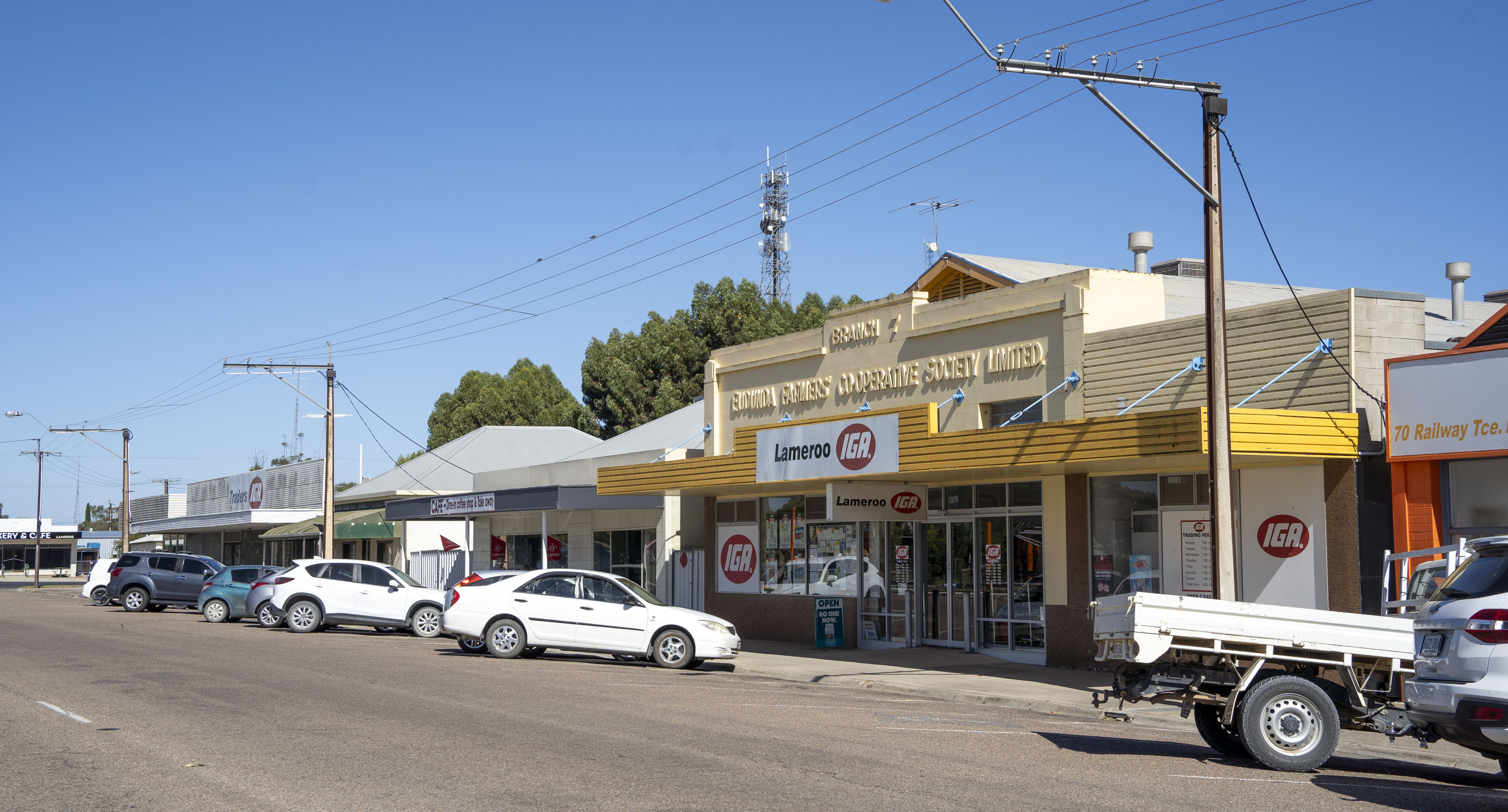
- Lameroo Town Centre in January 2025

- Coordinates: 35°19′52″S 140°30′57″E
- Country: Australia
- State: South Australia
- Region: Murray and Mallee
- LGA: Southern Mallee District Council
- Location: 40 km (25 mi) W of Victorian Border; 210 km (130 mi) E of Adelaide
- Established: 17 November 1904 (town); 2 August 1999 (locality)

Government
  - State electorate: Hammond
  - Federal division: Barker
- Elevation (railway station): 98 m (322 ft)

Population
  - Total: 567 (UCL 2021)
- Time zone: UTC+9:30 (ACST)
  - Summer (DST): UTC+10:30 (ACST)
- Postcode: 5302
- County: Chandos
- Mean max temp: 22.9 °C (73.2 °F)
- Mean min temp: 8.8 °C (47.8 °F)
- Annual rainfall: 382.3 mm (15.05 in)
Localities around Lameroo
Marama	Sandalwood; Billiatt	Karte
Parrakie	Lameroo	Karte; Parilla
Parrakie	Ngarkat	Ngarkat

Lameroo is a town in the Murray Mallee region of South Australia. It is on the Mallee Highway and Pinnaroo railway line about 40 km west of the Victorian border, or 210 km east of Adelaide. It is primarily a service town for the surrounding rural areas, growing grain and sheep. Lameroo now includes the former settlements of Kulkami, Mulpata, Wirha and Gurrai, which were on the Peebinga railway line, and Wilkawatt, which was between Parrakie and Lameroo on the Pinnaroo railway.

The local school, the Lameroo Regional Community School is not only for Lameroo pupils, but also those from the surrounding towns of Geranium, Parrakie and Parilla. The school is known for being the only one in Australia that teaches Afrikaans as a second language, having done so for primary school students since 2024 (with German being the language taught in high school). Afrikaans is taught due to the town's growing South African community working in the agricultural sector.

Lameroo is home to the Lameroo Hawks Football Club, coached by former Adelaide Crows player Rodney Maynard.

== History ==
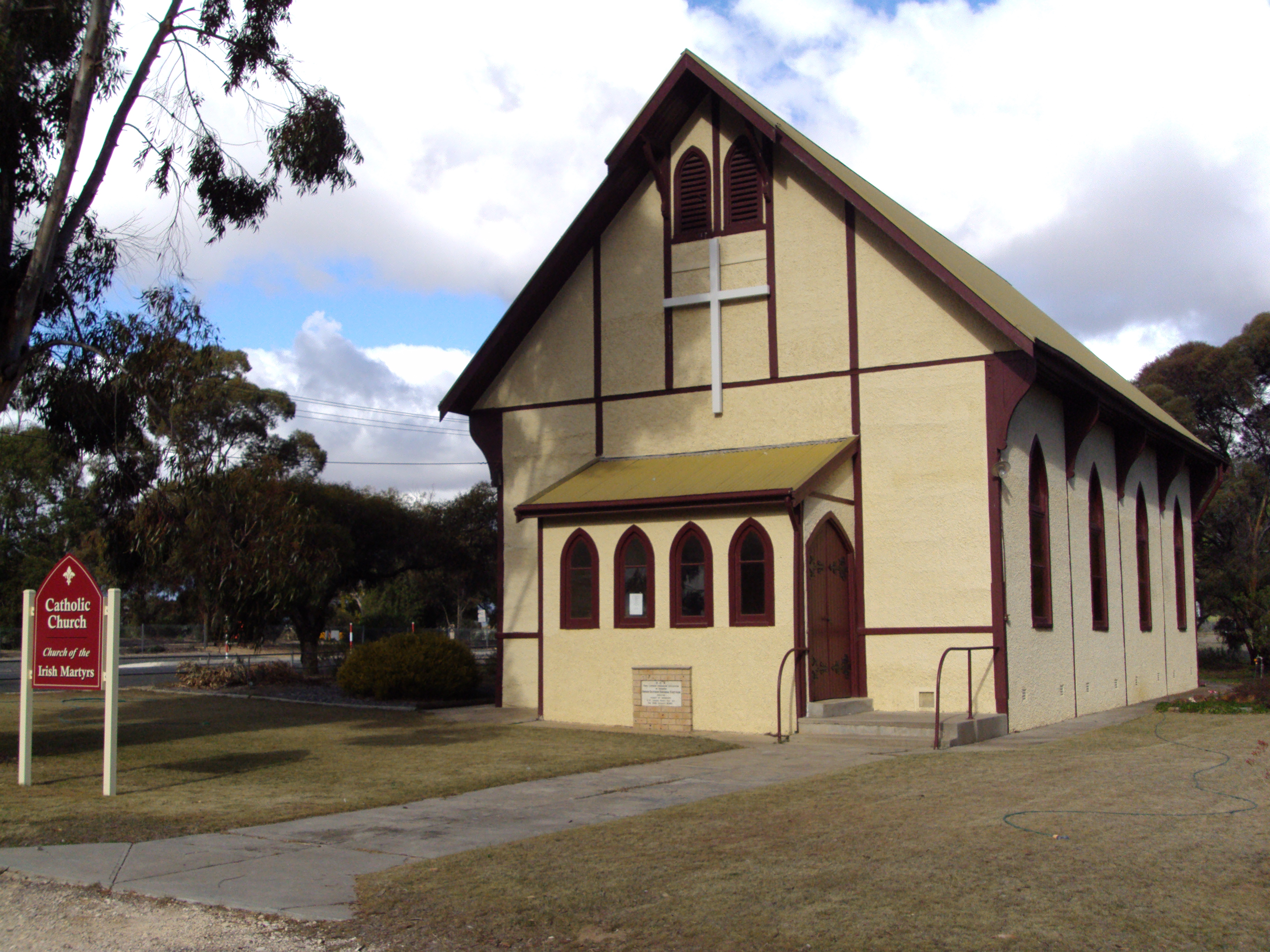
Irish Martyrs Catholic Church, Lameroo

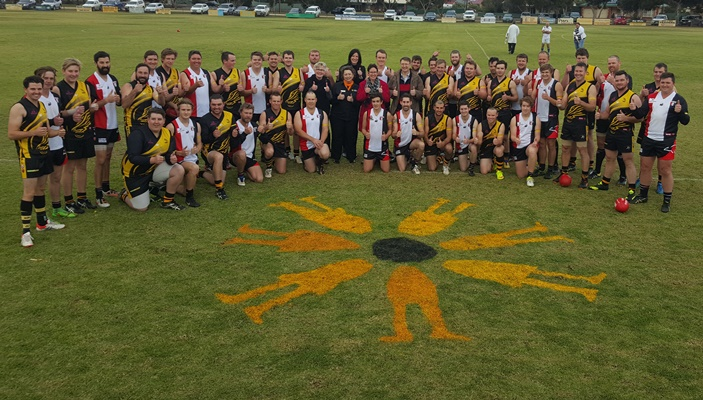
Melanoma Awareness Day conducted by the Australian Melanoma Research Foundation in 2016.

Land in the Murray Mallee region was first taken up on pastoral lease in the late 1850s. For the first twenty years there were several lessees; the area had limited grazing during this time. After a well was dug at Lameroo, then known as Wow Wow Plain, in 1884, settlement on Wow Wow Plain became permanent. The land was surveyed in 1894, and the initial survey of Wow Wow Plain gave each block some natural open land to start cultivating. The town reserve was proclaimed in 1894 and a Government well was excavated.

The town was named Lameroo in 1904 at the suggestion of J.M. Johnston who had worked on the Overland Telegraph Line and heard the word in Darwin (as the name of the Lameroo Beach) and liked the sound of it.

Much of the land that became the District Council of Lameroo (now the western part of the Southern Mallee District Council) was released for pastoral ownership in about 1858.

Lameroo celebrated its centenary in 2006, it being 100 years since the railway line was built through Lameroo.

The historic former Bank Manager's Residence and the Irish Martyrs Catholic Church are listed on the South Australian Heritage Register.

The Pinnaroo railway line opened through Lameroo in 1906. It initially carried mixed goods, as well as passengers. In later years, only bulk grain was transported on the line, with trains emptying the silos at Lameroo. After mid-2015, the railway ceased to be used, and the 2015 harvest onwards would be transported away by road.

== Media ==
Lameroo was the home of the Pinnaroo Country News (5 June 1908 – 31 March 1922), which was the first country newspaper established by newspaperman James Barclay, in partnership with William Macfarlane. After 1911, it suffered due to the arrival of the Pinnaroo and Border Times (1911–1941).

Lameroo was also home to two short-lived publications: the Lameroo Weekly News (9 – 30 June 1922), printed by Chas. Laycock, and the Lameroo Mail (11 – 18 February 1927), printed by G.W. Veale.

== Attractions ==
Lameroo lies between the Billiatt Wilderness Protection Area to the north, and the Ngarkat Conservation Park to the south. Both protected areas are reserves for bushwalkers and nature enthusiasts. In spring, native Australian wildflowers abound in the Ngarkat, while the Billiatt offers native fauna such as kangaroos and mallee fowl.

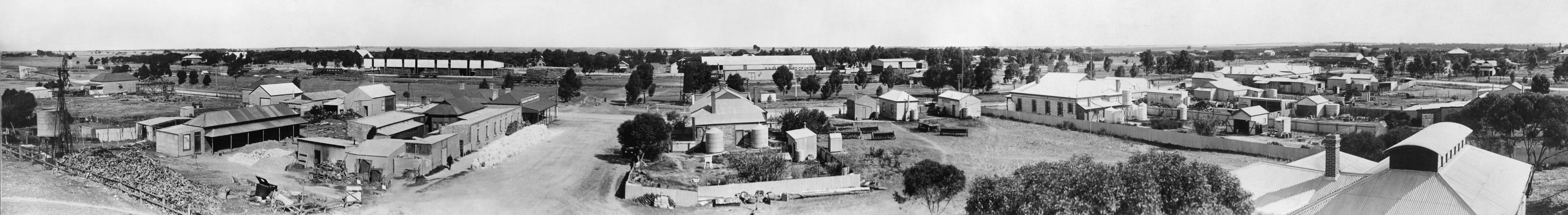
Lameroo in 1925, looking south towards the railway station

== Climate ==
Climate data for Lameroo (1991–2020)
Month	Jan	Feb	Mar	Apr	May	Jun	Jul	Aug	Sep	Oct	Nov	Dec	Year
Record high °C (°F)	46.2 (115.2)	47.6 (117.7)	42.4 (108.3)	39.2 (102.6)	30.3 (86.5)	24.7 (76.5)	24.9 (76.8)	29.2 (84.6)	34.4 (93.9)	39.3 (102.7)	44.0 (111.2)	48.4 (119.1)	48.4 (119.1)
Mean daily maximum °C (°F)	31.8 (89.2)	31.3 (88.3)	27.8 (82.0)	23.4 (74.1)	18.8 (65.8)	15.7 (60.3)	15.1 (59.2)	16.5 (61.7)	19.6 (67.3)	23.6 (74.5)	27.0 (80.6)	29.4 (84.9)	23.3 (73.9)
Daily mean °C (°F)	23.0 (73.4)	22.7 (72.9)	19.8 (67.6)	16.3 (61.3)	13.1 (55.6)	10.5 (50.9)	9.9 (49.8)	10.6 (51.1)	12.8 (55.0)	15.7 (60.3)	18.7 (65.7)	20.9 (69.6)	16.2 (61.2)
Mean daily minimum °C (°F)	14.1 (57.4)	14.1 (57.4)	11.9 (53.4)	9.2 (48.6)	7.3 (45.1)	5.4 (41.7)	4.7 (40.5)	4.8 (40.6)	5.9 (42.6)	7.8 (46.0)	10.4 (50.7)	12.4 (54.3)	9.0 (48.2)
Record low °C (°F)	5.6 (42.1)	4.6 (40.3)	2.2 (36.0)	1.0 (33.8)	−2.2 (28.0)	−2.8 (27.0)	−2.3 (27.9)	−2.0 (28.4)	−1.6 (29.1)	−0.4 (31.3)	1.1 (34.0)	3.5 (38.3)	−2.8 (27.0)
Average precipitation mm (inches)	22.4 (0.88)	18.4 (0.72)	15.1 (0.59)	24.8 (0.98)	29.6 (1.17)	33.7 (1.33)	35.9 (1.41)	39.8 (1.57)	38.0 (1.50)	27.5 (1.08)	29.5 (1.16)	25.0 (0.98)	339.6 (13.37)
Average precipitation days (≥ 1 mm)	2.9	2.2	2.5	4.0	6.2	7.3	8.7	8.7	6.9	5.6	4.6	3.5	63.1
Average dew point °C (°F)	9.1 (48.4)	9.8 (49.6)	9.0 (48.2)	7.7 (45.9)	7.6 (45.7)	6.6 (43.9)	5.9 (42.6)	5.7 (42.3)	6.5 (43.7)	6.1 (43.0)	7.0 (44.6)	7.7 (45.9)	7.4 (45.3)
Source: National Oceanic and Atmospheric Administration
