= Pinnaroo, South Australia =

Pinnaroo
- Town
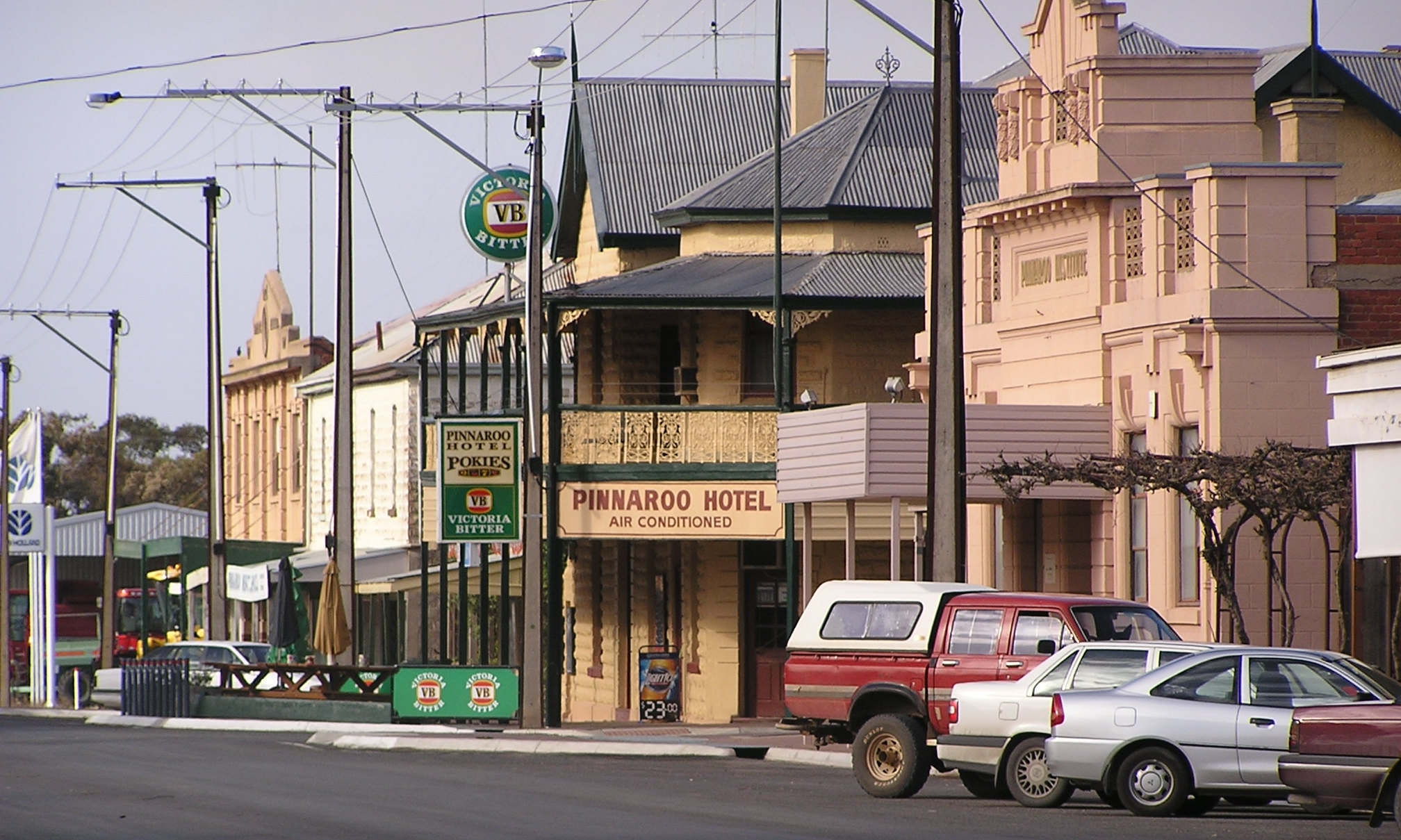
- Pinnaroo main street, looking east

- Coordinates: 35°15′39″S 140°54′21″E
- Country: Australia
- State: South Australia
- Region: Murray and Mallee
- LGA: Southern Mallee District Council
- Location: 243 km (151 mi) east of Adelaide
- Established: 17 November 1904 (town); 2 August 1999 (locality)

Government
  - State electorate: Hammond
  - Federal division: Barker

Population
  - Total: 575 (UCL 2021)
- Postcode: 5304
- County: Chandos
- Mean max temp: 22.9 °C (73.2 °F)
- Mean min temp: 8.8 °C (47.8 °F)
- Annual rainfall: 382.3 mm (15.05 in)
Localities around Pinnaroo
Karte	Karte	Panitya
Parilla	Pinnaroo	Panitya
Ngarkat	Ngarkat	Big Desert

Pinnaroo is a town in the Murray Mallee region of South Australia, near the border with Victoria, 243 km east of Adelaide. Pinnaroo is on the north side of the Mallee Highway, and on the railway line between Tailem Bend and Ouyen. The roadhouse on the highway at Pinnaroo is the first "food and leg-stretch" stop on the bus route from Adelaide to Sydney.

== History ==
The town's name is derived from a word for "big man" in a local Aboriginal language. The railway arrived in the area in 1906. There had not been any significant development in the area before that, as the remoteness and difficulty of getting supplies in and produce out had made it uneconomic to farm before that.

== Economy ==
The railway is not currently available for transport between the states, as the line from Tailem Bend was converted to standard gauge and more recently mothballed forcing grain to be trucked to the port. The town has become a major centre for growing potatoes since around 1990.

== Recreation ==
Pinnaroo has a show and field days every year at the start of October. The Pinnaroo Show features dog trials, agricultural tents, competitions, horse events, keg tosses, animal judging and fireworks. The show attracts large crowds each year.

The Peebinga Conservation Park is 42 kilometres (26 mi) north of Pinnaroo, Karte Conservation Park 30 km north-west, and the much larger Ngarkat Conservation Park is 28 kilometres (17 mi) south of the town, all accessible by off road vehicles.

The town has a large variety of sports, such as Australian rules football, netball, cricket, tennis, basketball, volleyball, lawn bowls, badminton, golf and darts. The local football team, the Pinnaroo Supa Roos play in the Mallee Football League.

From about 2012 to 2020, residents of Pinnaroo volunteered their time and effort to transform a stormwater collection site, formerly an old railway dam for steam trains, into a wetland bordering the Mallee Highway. It is the only water attraction in the area, and a popular place to explore nature or sit and watch the birdlife, which includes crakes and grebes.

== Government ==
Pinnaroo is the seat of the local government area of the Southern Mallee District Council, and is in the state electoral district of Chaffey and the federal division of Barker.

== Media ==
The Border Times is a weekly newspaper published since 1911.

== Education ==
Pinnaroo Primary School is a public primary school for students in Reception to Year 7, and has approximately 80 students. The school has four composite classes - Reception, Years 1 and 2, Years 3 and 4, and Years 5,6 and 7. It is the only school within 30 km of the town. The school's slogan is Aim High and is home to South Australia's first community library, which opened in 1977.

The school regularly takes part in interschool sports with neighbouring schools, Lameroo and Geranium, in swimming and athletics. The school also takes part in the South Australian Public Schools Amateur Sports Association (SAPSASA) with the Murray Mallee team in sports such as Australian rules football, cricket, athletics, swimming, golf, softball, tennis, netball and basketball. The school has four classrooms, a GP room, an art and technical centre, a home economics centre, an FM radio station, a swimming pool, two ovals, outdoor tennis, netball and basketball courts, and a full-size gymnasium.

== Tourism ==
Pinnaroo is home to the Mallee Tourist and Heritage Centre, which apart from displays on local farming history, has well-maintained and presented collections relative to three distinct topics: history of wheat breeding (featuring the D. A. Wurfel grain collection); an extensive range of restored farm machinery, based on the Gum Family Collection, which includes a replica Ridley stripper; and letterpress printing. The museum is supported by the Pinnaroo Historical Society.

== Gallery ==
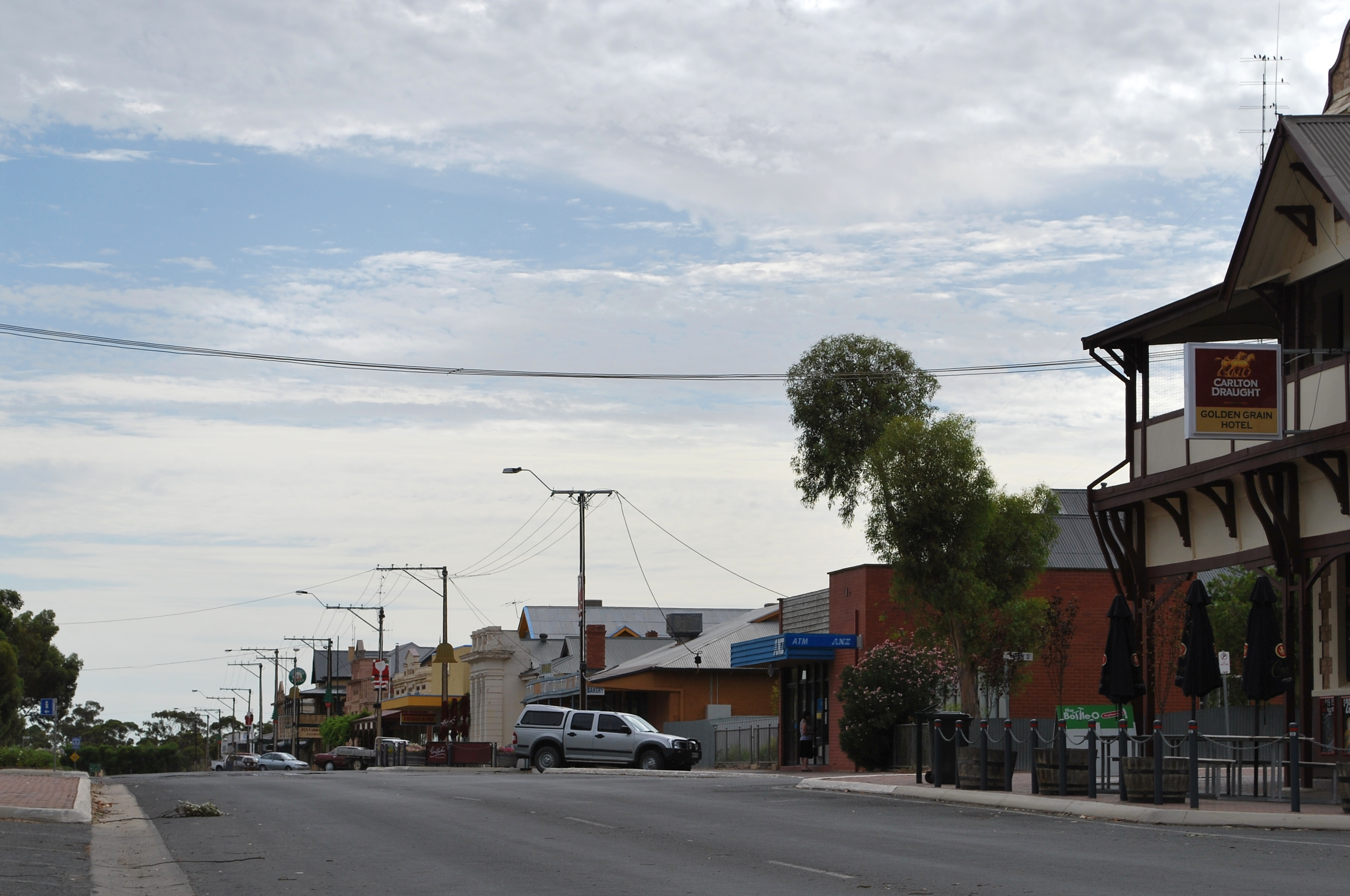
Main Street

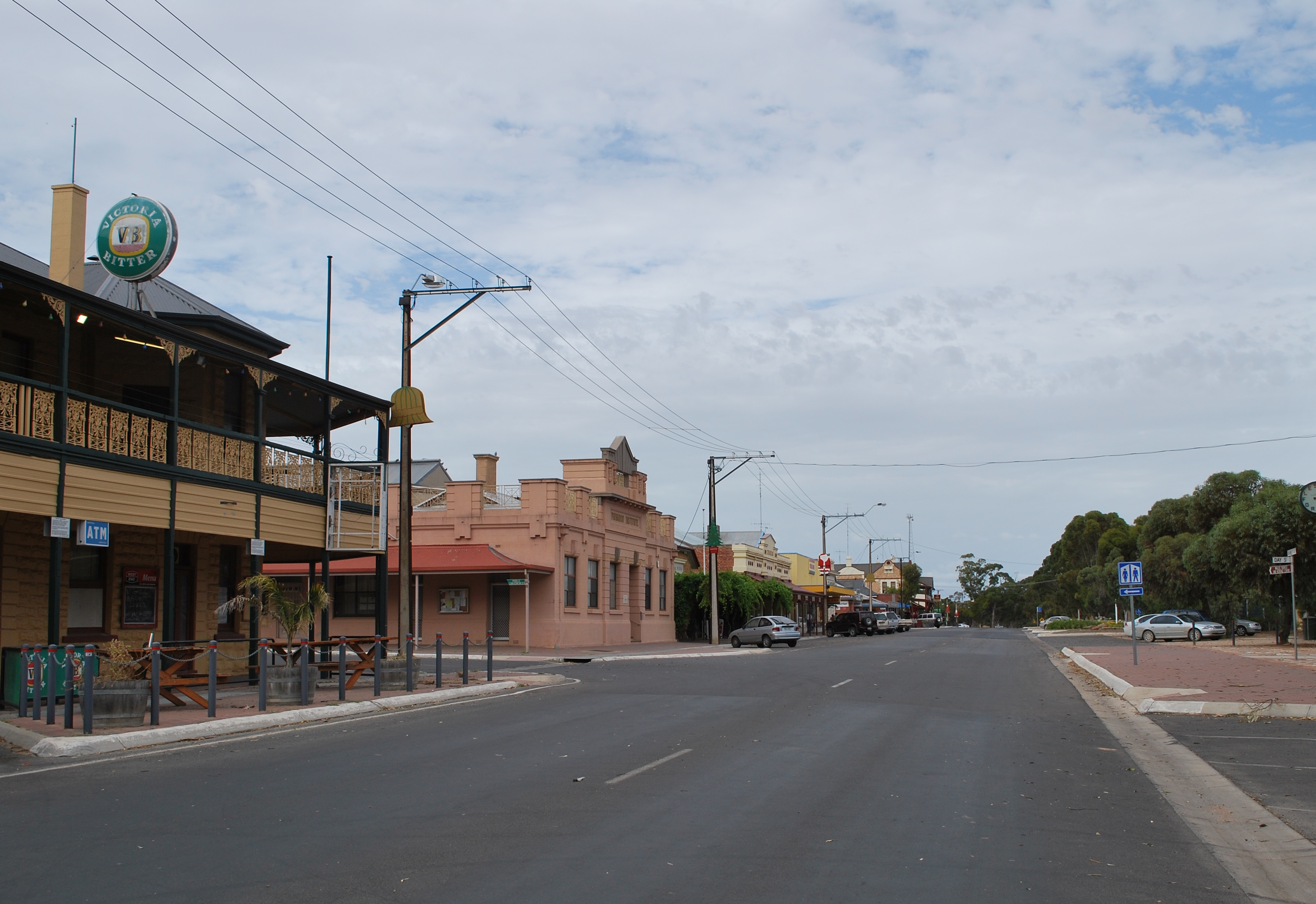
Main Street

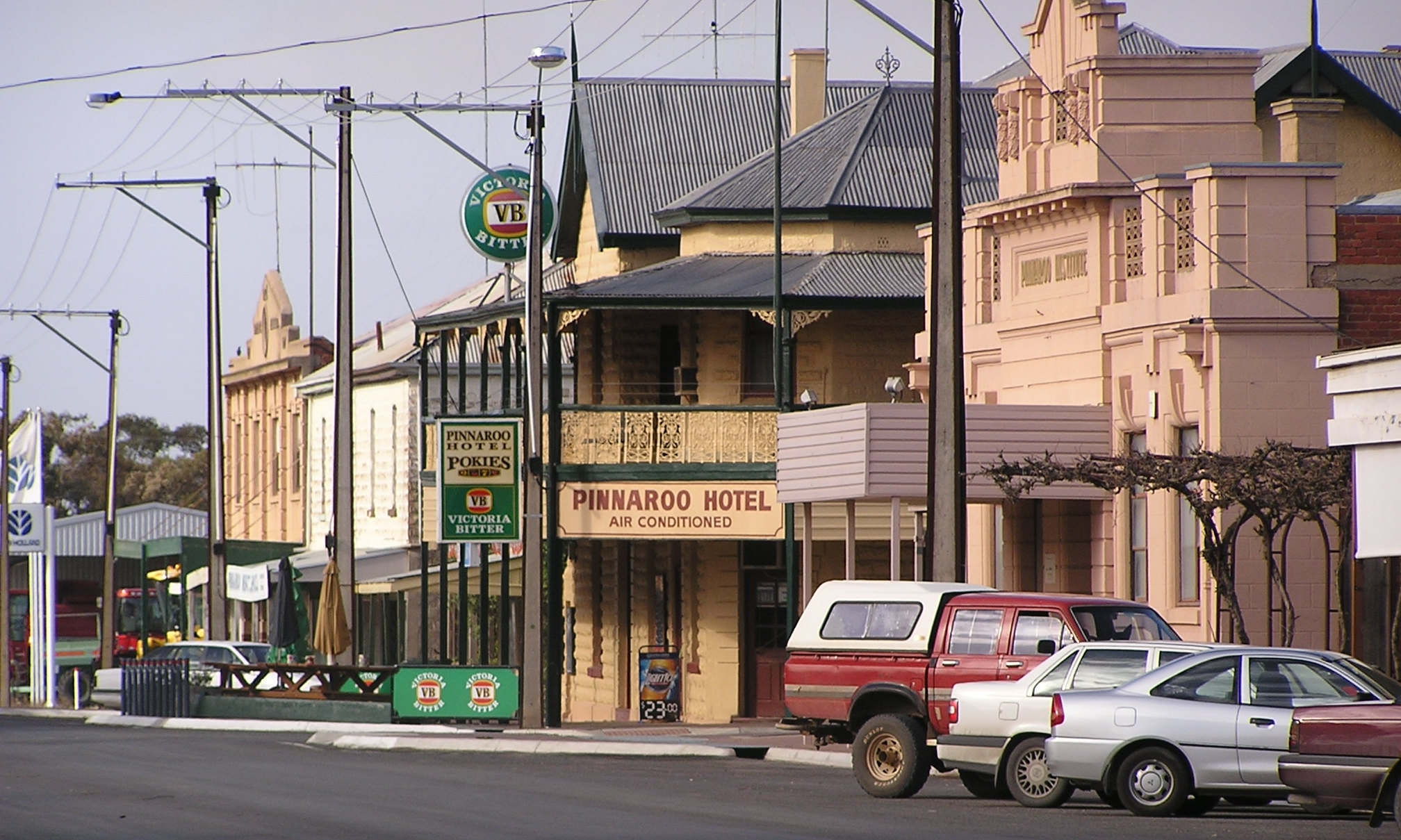
Main Street

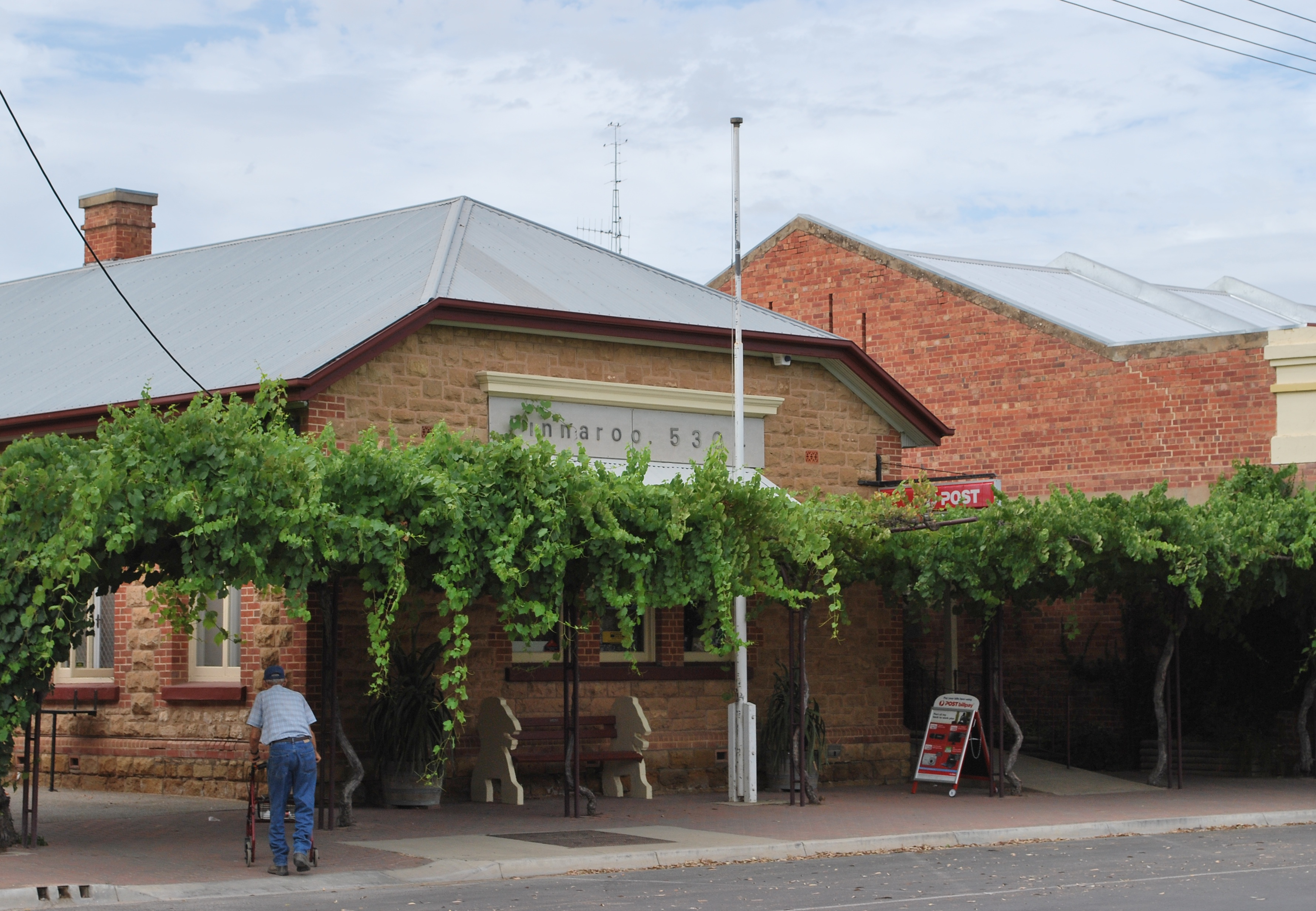
Post Office

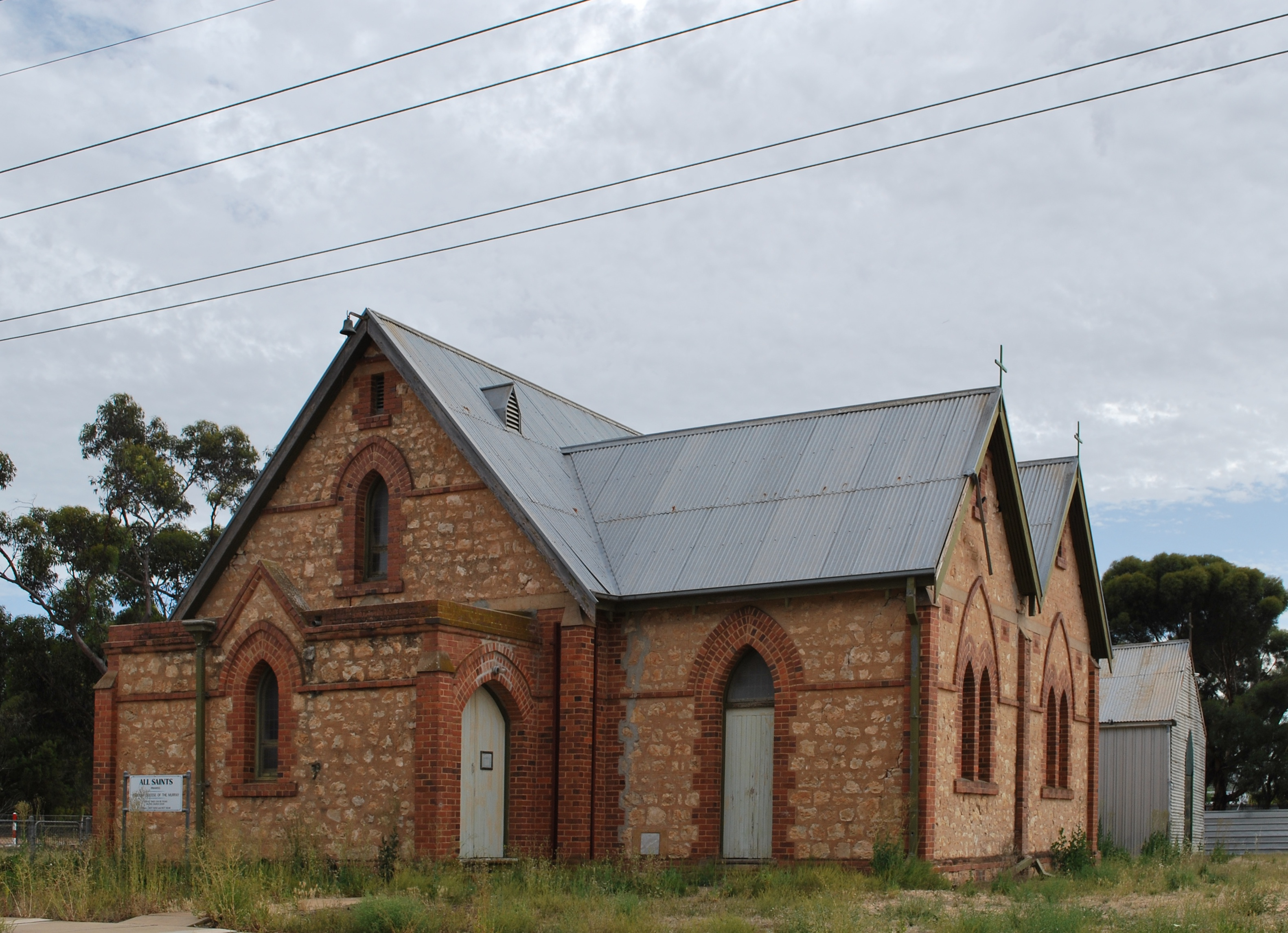
Anglican Church

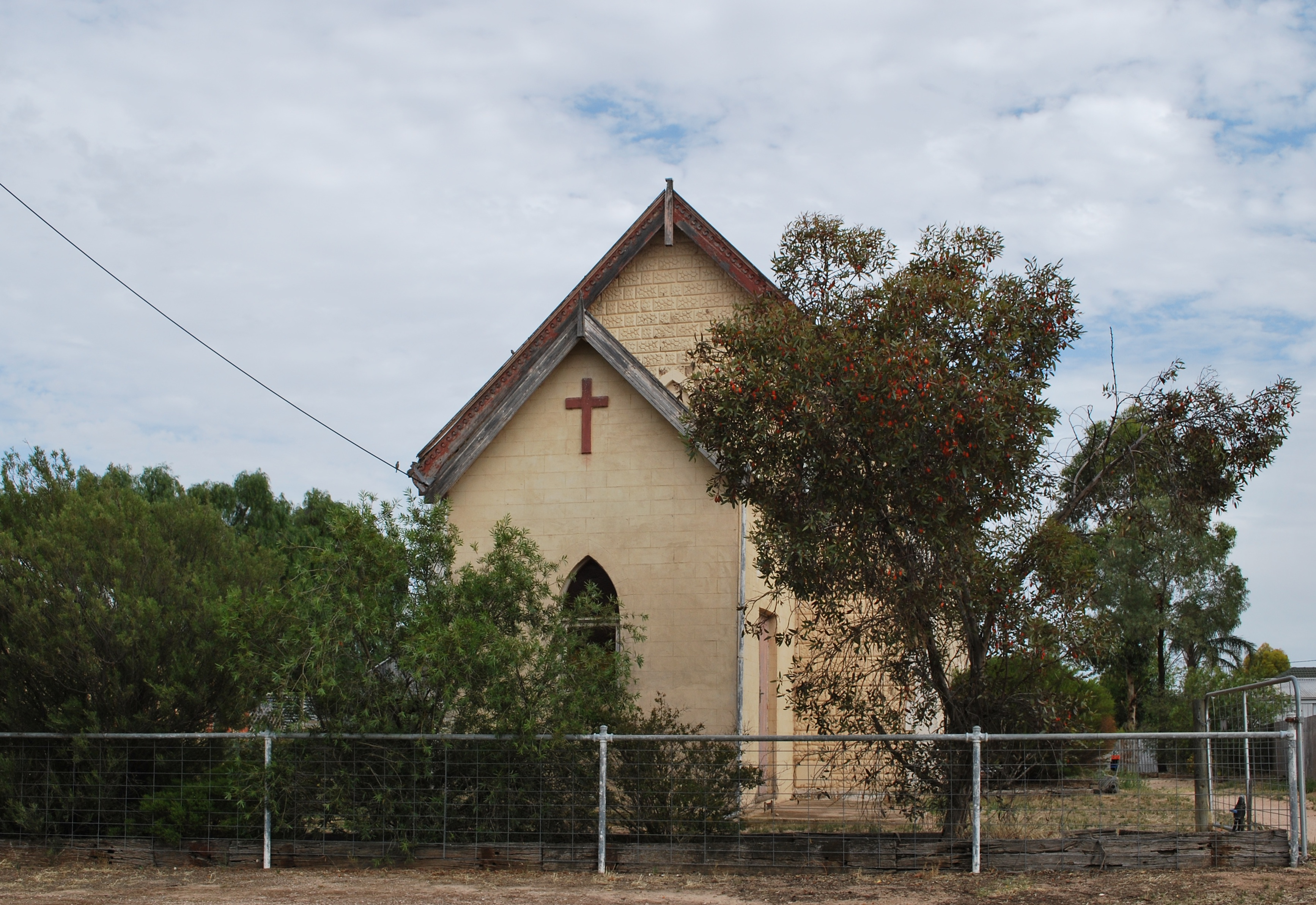
Church

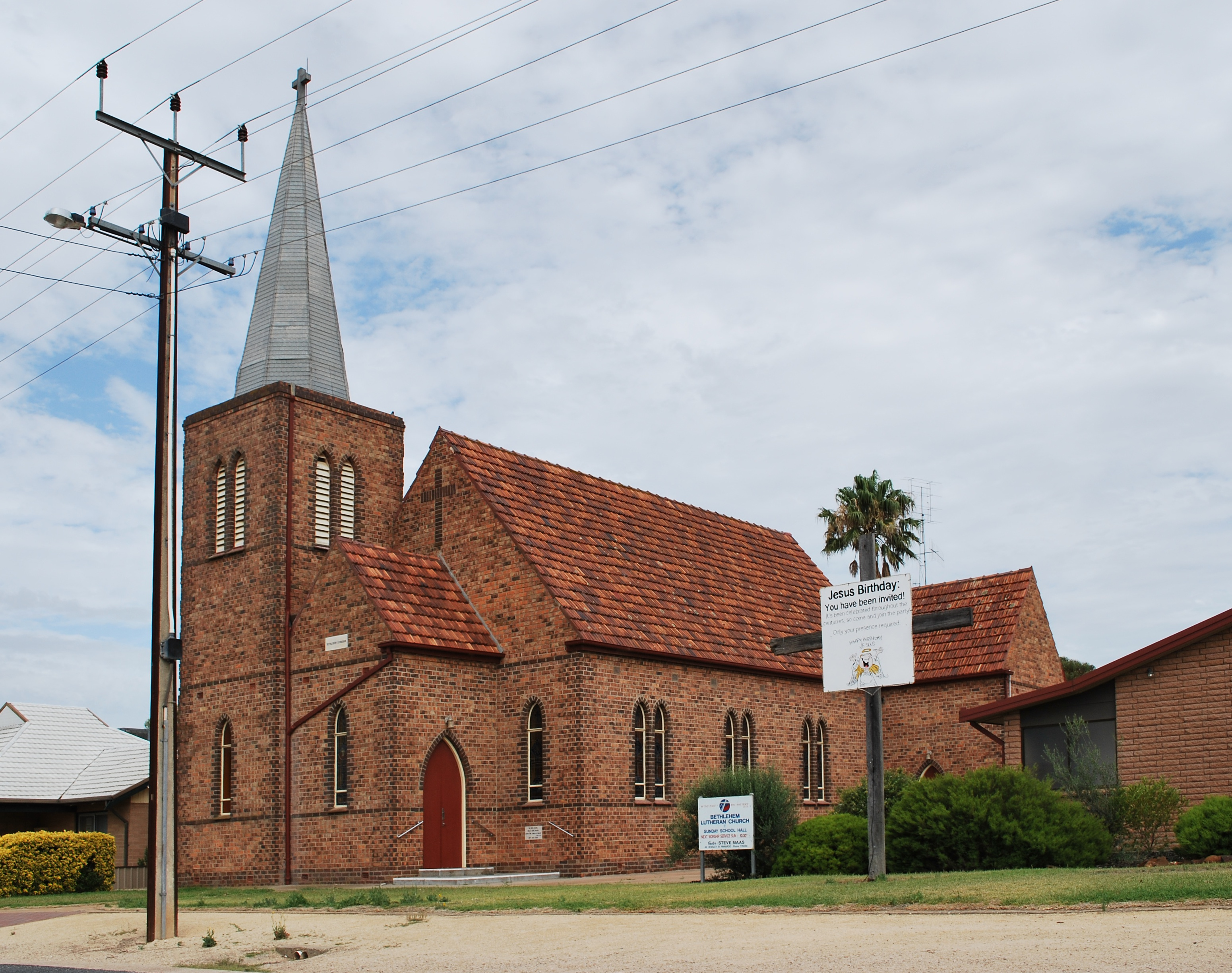
Lutheran Church

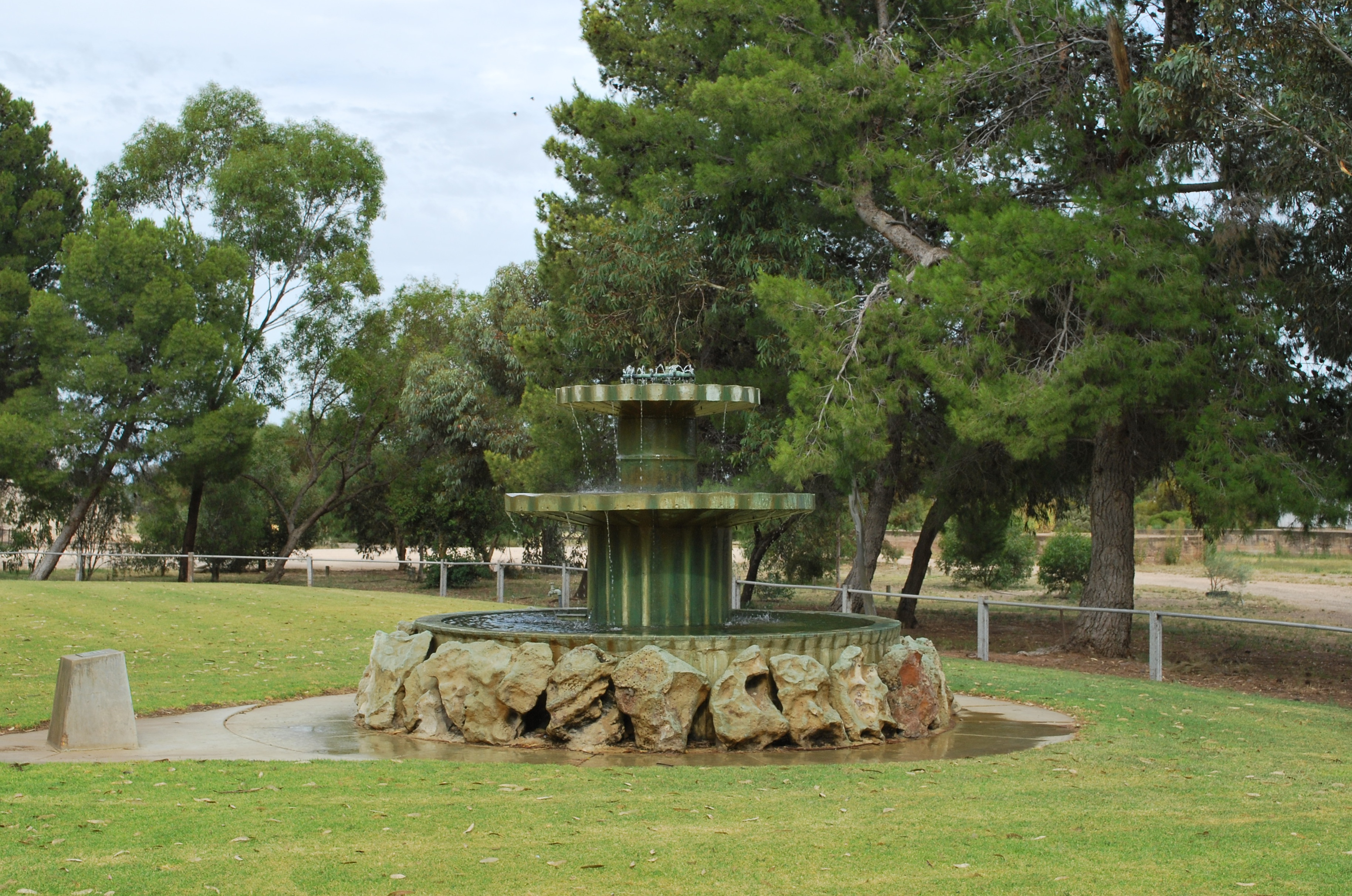
Fountain

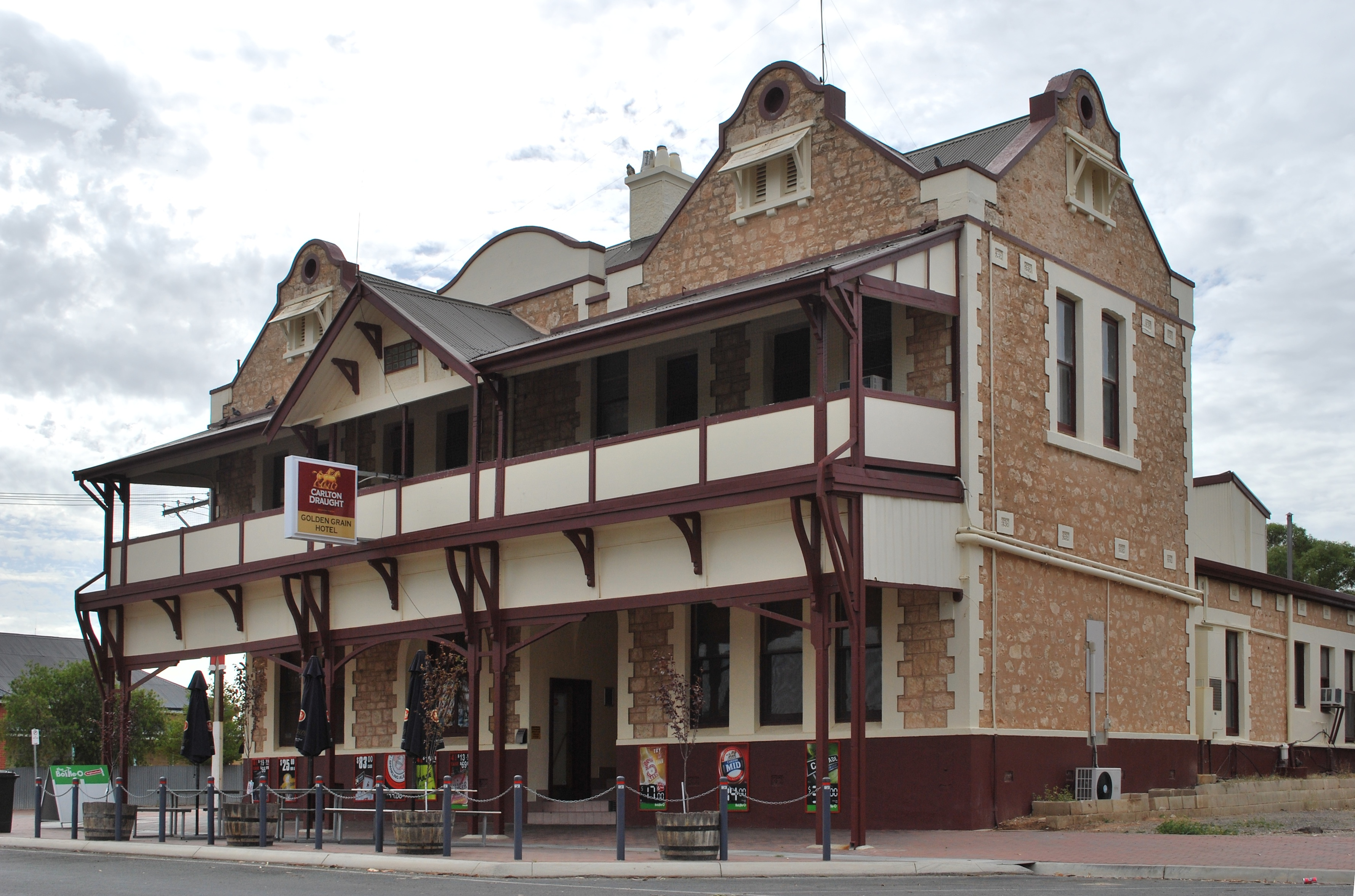
Golden Grain Hotel

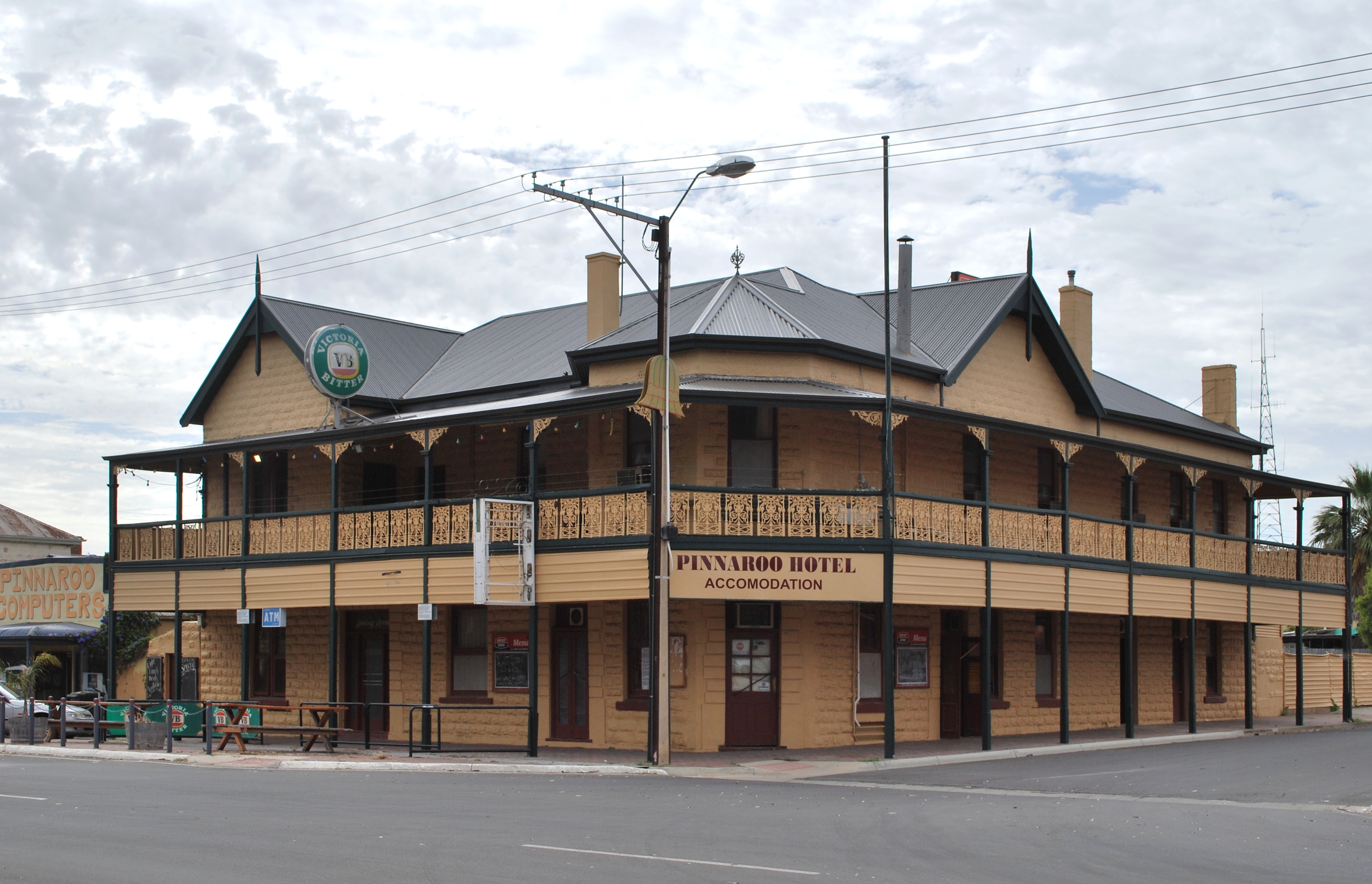
Pinnaroo Hotel

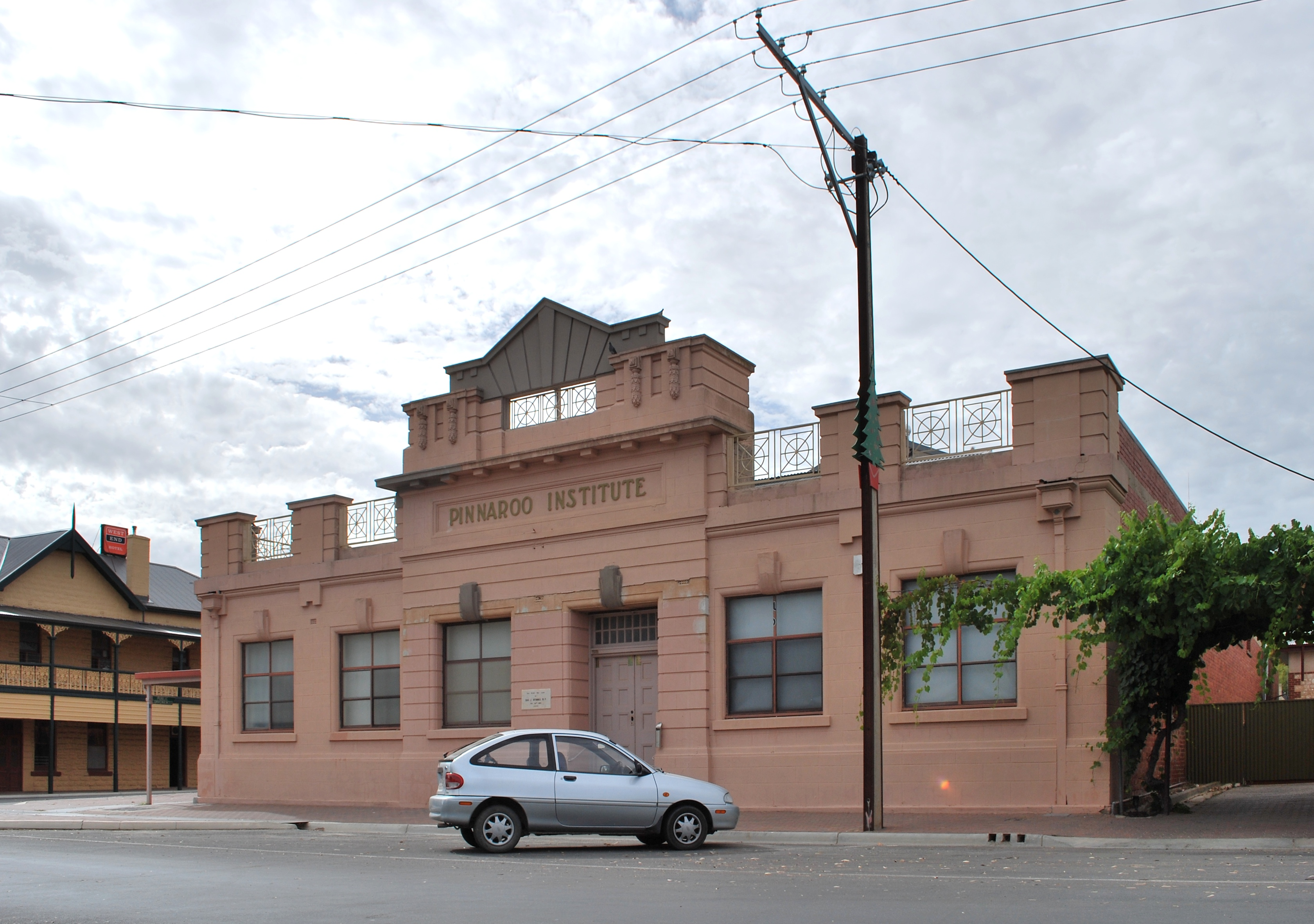
Pinnaroo Institute

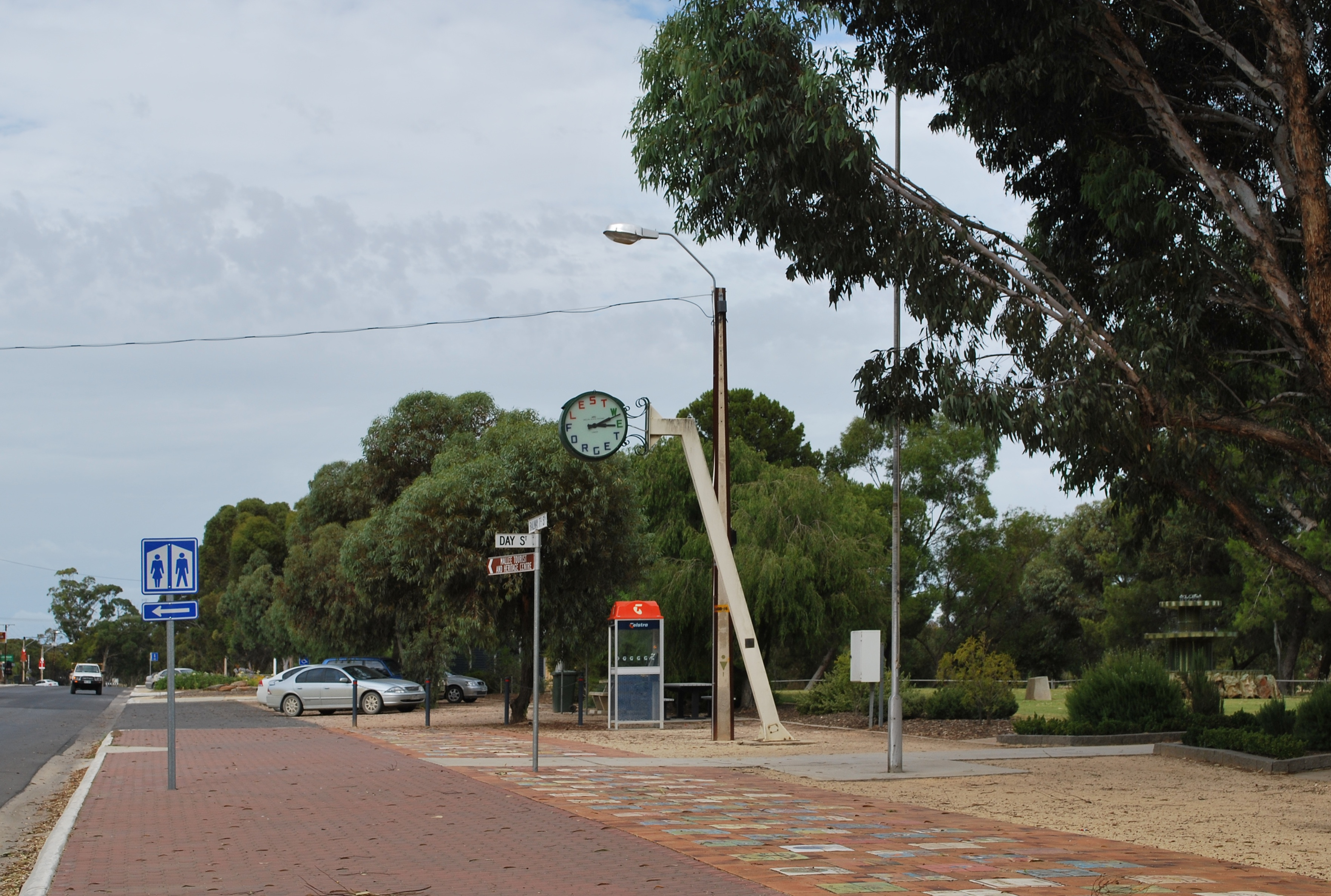
Memorial Clock

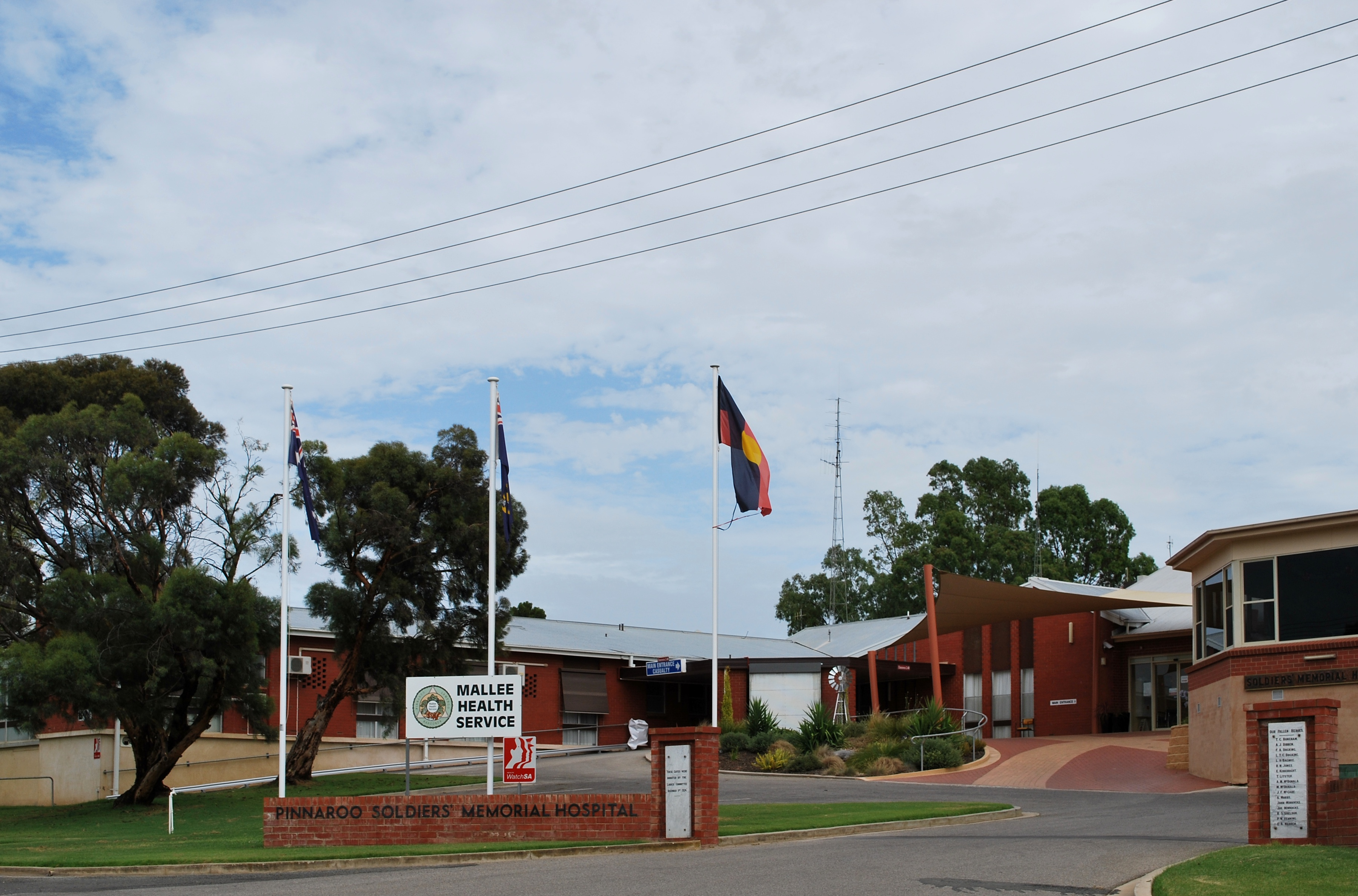
Memorial Hospital

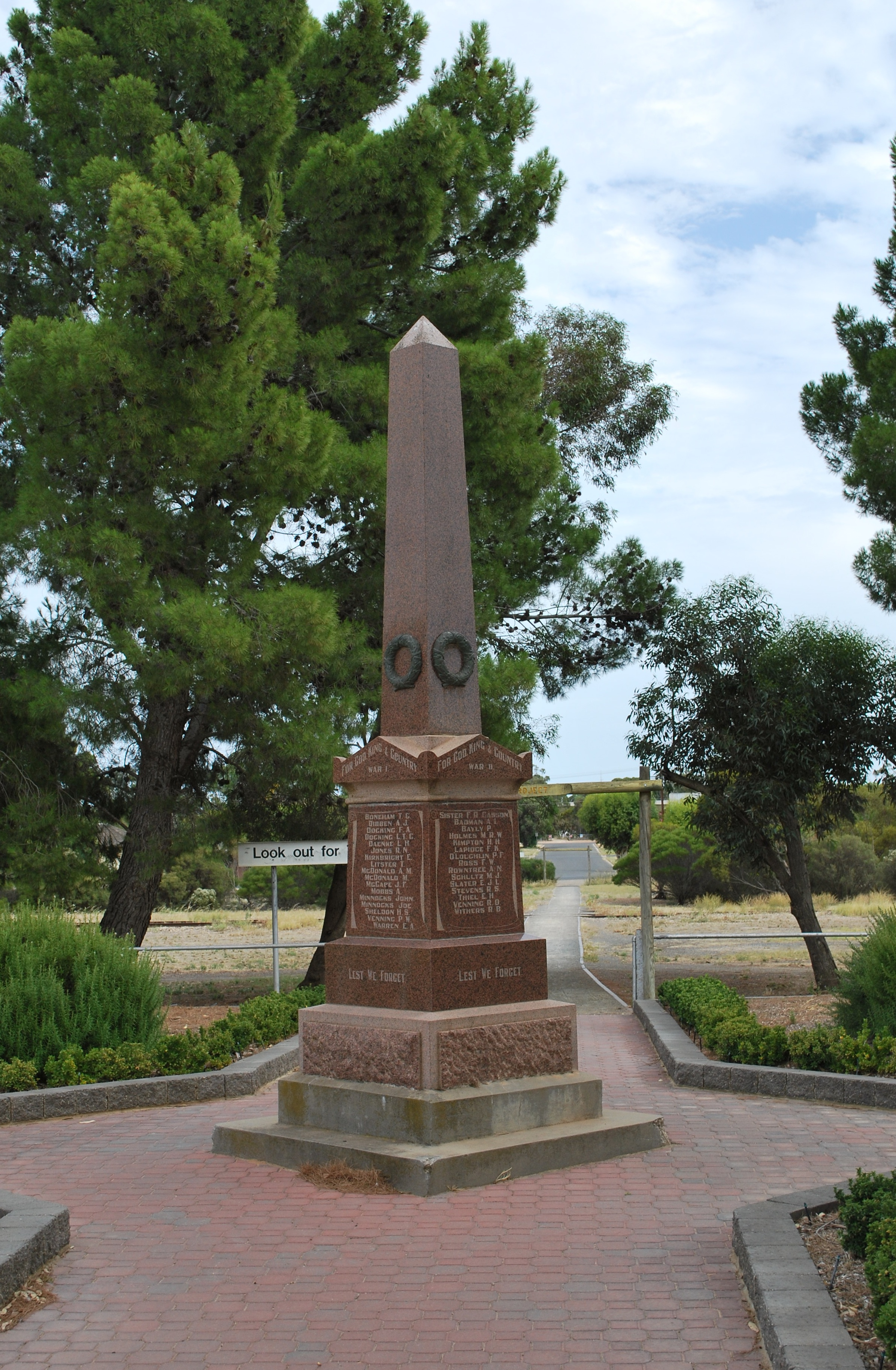
War Memorial
