= Karoonda =

Karoonda may also refer to:

- Karoonda, South Australia, a town and locality
- Karoonda Highway, a road in South Australia
- Karoonda Magpies, an Australian rules football club in South Australia
- Karoonda meteorite, a meteorite found in South Australia
- District Council of Karoonda, a former local government area in South Australia; now part of the District Council of Karoonda East Murray
