= Galga, South Australia =

Galga
- Town
- Coordinates: 34°41′49″S 139°57′38″E
- Country: Australia
- State: South Australia
- Region: Murray and Mallee
- LGAs: District Council of Karoonda East Murray; District Council of Loxton Waikerie
- Location: 127 km (79 mi) E of Adelaide; 44 km (27 mi) N of Karoonda; 62 km (39 mi) SW of Loxton
- Established: 10 February 1916 (town); 11 November 1999 (locality)

Government
  - State electorates: Chaffey; Hammond
  - Federal division: Barker
- Elevation: 70 m (230 ft)

Population
  - Total: 28 (SAL 2021)
- Time zone: UTC+9:30 (ACST)
  - Summer (DST): UTC+10:30 (ACDT)
- Postcode: 5308
- County: Albert
- Mean max temp: 23.6 °C (74.5 °F)
- Mean min temp: 8.7 °C (47.7 °F)
- Annual rainfall: 271.1 mm (10.67 in)
Localities around Galga
Bakara Well	Maggea	Mercunda
Bakara Well; Bakara	Galga	Mercunda
Copeville	Copeville	Copeville

Galga is a settlement in the northern Murray Mallee region of South Australia. The town of Galga was surveyed in 1915 after the Waikerie railway line from Karoonda to Waikerie was opened in 1914. The line was shortened to Galga in 1990, and closed completely in 1994. There is a small bulk grain silo at Galga, but it is no longer regularly used. The settlement has an active Country Fire Service brigade with one fire truck.

Galga is located within the federal division of Barker, the state electoral districts of Chaffey and Hammond, and the local government areas of the District Council of Karoonda East Murray and the District Council of Loxton Waikerie.
