= Mercunda, South Australia =

Mercunda South Australia
- Coordinates: 34°38′23″S 140°01′55″E
- Population: 9 (2016 census)
- Established: 5 August 1915 (town); 11 November 1999 (locality)
- Postcode(s): 5308
- Elevation: 78 m (256 ft)
- Time zone: ACST (UTC+9:30)
  - Summer (DST): ACDT (UTC+10:30)
- Location: 134 km (83 mi) E of Adelaide; 52 km (32 mi) NE of Karoonda; 53 km (33 mi) SW of Loxton
- LGA(s): District Council of Karoonda East Murray; District Council of Loxton Waikerie
- Region: Murray and Mallee
- County: Albert
- State electorate(s): Chaffey; Hammond
- Federal division(s): Barker
Mean max temp	Mean min temp	Annual rainfall
23.6 °C; 74 °F	8.7 °C; 48 °F	271.1 mm 10.7 in
Localities around Mercunda:
Maggea	Maggea	Mantung
Maggea; Galga	Mercunda	Mantung; Mindarie
Copeville	Copeville	Mindarie
- Footnotes: Locations; Adjoining localities

Mercunda is a town and a locality in the Australian state of South Australia located in the state's south-east about 134 kilometres (83 mi) east of the state capital of Adelaide, and about 52 kilometres (32 mi) north-east and about 53 kilometres (33 mi) south-west respectively of the municipal seats of Karoonda and Loxton.

The government town of Mercunda was proclaimed on 5 August 1915 on land in the cadastral unit of the Hundred of Bakara located to the immediate north of the Mercunda Railway Station (previously known as the Mattala Railway Station) on the Waikerie railway line. The locality 's boundaries were created on 11 November 1999 and includes the site of the government town of Mercunda which is located in its approximate centre.

The town site was surveyed in March 1915. Its name is derived from an aboriginal name formerly used for part of the Canowie Pastoral Run rather than from the Mattala siding which was renamed to match the town before October 1915. A post office opened in 1915 and closed in 1983. A school operated from 1921 to 1956.

Land use within the locality is entirely ‘primary production’ with use in the southern part of the locality being described by its local government as “principally for agricultural production and the grazing of stock on relatively large holdings.”

The 2016 Australian census which was conducted in August 2016 reports that Mercunda had a population of 9 people.

Mercunda is located within the federal division of Barker, the state electoral districts of Chaffey and Hammond, and the local government areas of the District Council of Karoonda East Murray and the District Council of Loxton Waikerie.
