= Wanbi, South Australia =

Rural township in South Australia

Wanbi South Australia
- Coordinates: 34°46′08″S 140°18′36″E
- Population: 23 (SAL 2021)
- Established: 9 July 1914 (town); 11 November 1999 (locality)
- Postcode(s): 5310
- Time zone: ACST (UTC+9:30)
  - Summer (DST): ACDT (UTC+10:30)
- Location: 157 km (98 mi) E of Adelaide; 56 km (35 mi) NE of Karoonda
- LGA(s): District Council of Karoonda East Murray
- Region: Murray and Mallee
- County: Albert
- State electorate(s): Hammond
- Federal division(s): Barker
| Mean max temp | Mean min temp | Annual rainfall |
| 23.6 °C; 74 °F | 8.7 °C; 48 °F | 271.1 mm 10.7 in |
Localities around Wanbi:
| Caliph | Caliph | Veitch |
| Halidon; Mindarie | Wanbi | Alawoona; Schell Well |
| Halidon | Sandalwood | Sandalwood |
- Footnotes: Locations; Adjoining localities

Wanbi is a township on the Karoonda Highway in the Australian state of South Australia, about 160 kilometres (99 mi) east of the state capital of Adelaide and about 56 kilometres (35 mi) north-east of the municipal seat of Karoonda. Situated on a ridgeline covered by mallee trees, it has a one-street layout common to many South Australian townships. A hotel, advertised as being "in the heart of the scrub, stumps and sand", was built in 1932, when commercial activity was increasing and a general store, cream depot and several houses – most housing South Australian Railways employees – were present.

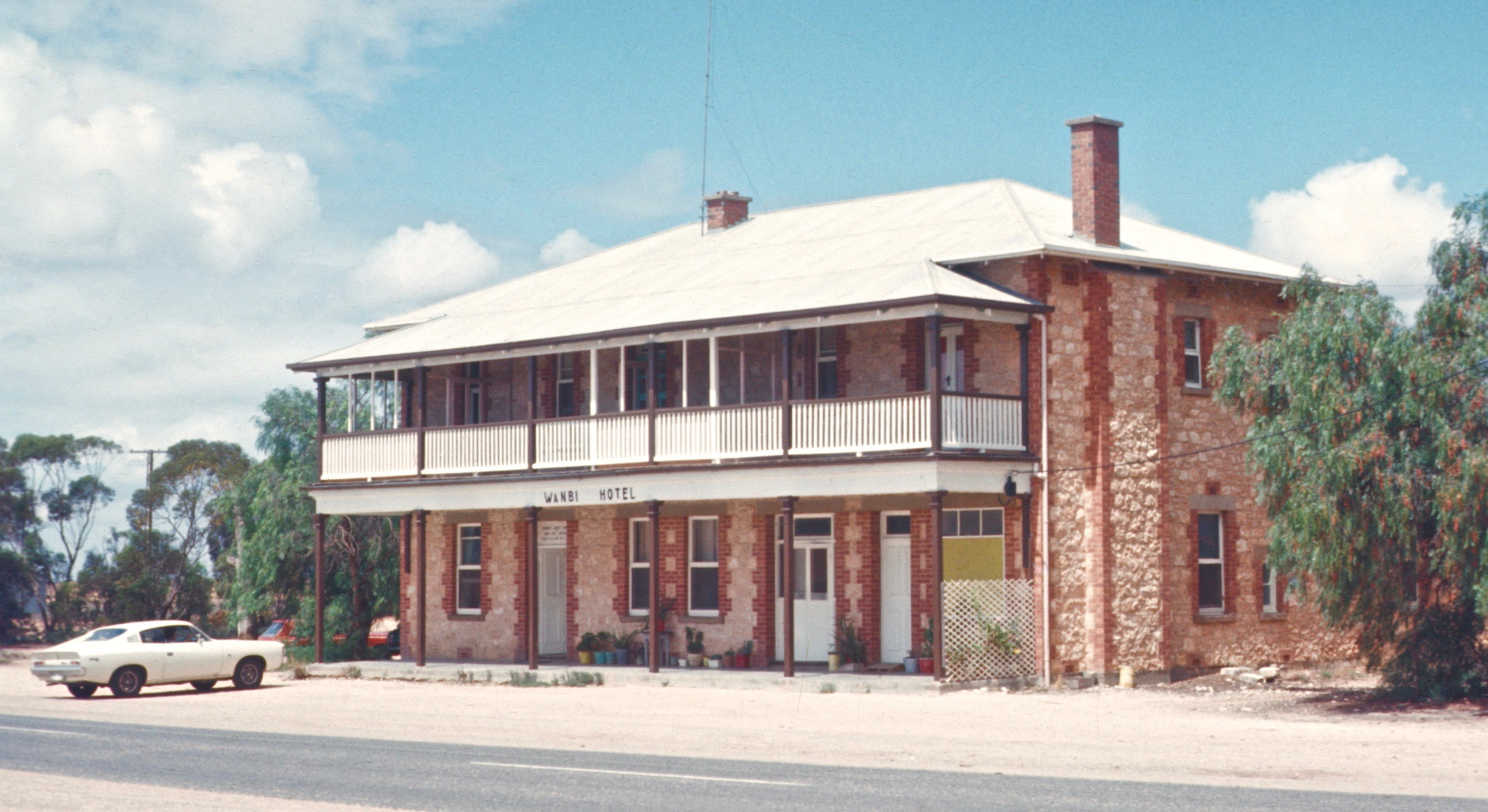
Wanbi Hotel in 1972. Memorabilia of the former nearby railway station and the South Australian Railways are displayed here.

Like much of the central and northern parts of the Murraylands, the sandy soil, inferior for cropping, was not attractive to would-be farmers. When it became evident that settlement was unlikely to proceed outward from the river to such areas, the state government decided – in contrast to its policy elsewhere of building railways following settlement – that the Mallee could only be opened up for settlement if the railway were built first. Wanbi railway station was established in 1912 on the 1600 mm (5 ft 3 in) broad-gauge railway line built to Paringa. (Note: Later extended over the River Murray to Barmera.) Thirteen years later, it became a junction when the Yinkanie branchline was opened. Wanbi became busier, meeting some of the needs of the branchline communities and railway staff alike. However, in the mid-1960s, the Moorook citrus-fruit cooperatives ceased sending their product by rail from Yinkanie, removing a large portion of the paying freight handled at the terminus. Along the line, grain and superphosphate lingered on, together with some general freight, until 1971, when the branch was closed. In 1996, the mainline through Wanbi, en route to Loxton (Note: Later shortened to Tookayerta.) was converted to 1435 mm (4 ft 8 1/2 in) standard gauge. In 2015, that line also closed.
