= Sandalwood, South Australia =

Sandalwood
- Town
- Coordinates: 34°56′36″S 140°07′37″E
- Country: Australia
- State: South Australia
- Region: Murray and Mallee
- LGA: District Council of Karoonda East Murray
- Location: 139 km (86 mi) E of Adelaide
- Established: 9 April 1914 (town); 11 November 1999 (locality)

Government
  - State electorate: Hammond
  - Federal division: Barker

Population
  - Total: 60 (2016 census)
- Time zone: UTC+9:30 (ACST)
  - Summer (DST): UTC+10:30 (ACDT)
- Postcode: 5309
- County: Buccleuch; Chandos
- Mean max temp: 23.6 °C (74.5 °F)
- Mean min temp: 9.3 °C (48.7 °F)
- Annual rainfall: 343.0 mm (13.50 in)
Localities around Sandalwood
| Borrika | Halidon; Wanbi; Schell Well | Schell Well |
| Borrika | Sandalwood | Billiatt; Lameroo |
| Marama | Marama | Lameroo |
- Locations; Adjoining localities

Sandalwood is a town and locality in the Australian state of South Australia located about 139 kilometres (86 mi) east of the state capital of Adelaide.

Sandalwood lies between Karoonda and Alawoona on the Karoonda Highway and Loxton railway line. It was founded as a siding on the new railway line, which opened in 1913. The post office opened in 1914, and the school in 1919. These have now all closed.

The 2016 Australian census which was conducted in August 2016 reports that Sandalwood had a population of 60 people.

Sandalwood is located in the local government area of District Council of Karoonda East Murray, the state electoral district of Hammond and the federal Division of Barker.
