= Perponda, South Australia =

Perponda South Australia
- Coordinates: 34°58′58″S 139°49′00″E
- Population: 45 (SAL 2021)
- Established: 1 May 1919 (town); 11 November 1999 (locality)
- Postcode(s): 5308
- Elevation: 86 m (282 ft)
- Time zone: ACST (UTC+9:30)
  - Summer (DST): ACDT (UTC+10:30)
- Location: 111 km (69 mi) E of Adelaide
- LGA(s): District Council of Karoonda East Murray
- Region: Murray and Mallee
- County: Buccleuch
- State electorate(s): Hammond
- Federal division(s): Barker
Mean max temp	Mean min temp	Annual rainfall
23.6 °C; 74 °F	9.3 °C; 49 °F	343.0 mm 13.5 in
Localities around Perponda:
Claypans	Copeville	Copeville
Bowhill	Perponda	Borrika
Bowhill	Karoonda	Karoonda
- Footnotes: Locations; Adjoining localities

Perponda is a town and locality in the Australian state of South Australia located about 111 kilometres (69 mi) east of the state capital of Adelaide.

== History ==
Perponda was on the Waikerie railway line until it closed in 1994. The school opened in 1924, but has since closed. The town was surveyed in 1919 and the name is derived from the local Aboriginal word for the plains. The modern locality area includes the former town of Kalyan which was the next siding north along the railway.
