= Mindarie, South Australia =

Mindarie
- Town
- Coordinates: 34°48′56″S 140°13′00″E
- Country: Australia
- State: South Australia
- LGA: District Council of Karoonda East Murray
- Location: 148 km (92 mi) E of Adelaide; 45 km (28 mi) NE of Karoonda
- Established: 25 June 1914 (town); 11 November 1999 (locality)

Government
  - State electorate: Hammond
  - Federal division: Barker

Population
  - Total: 32 (SAL 2021)
- Time zone: UTC+9:30 (ACST)
  - Summer (DST): UTC+10:30 (ACDT)
- Postcode: 5309
- Mean max temp: 23.6 °C (74.5 °F)
- Mean min temp: 8.7 °C (47.7 °F)
- Annual rainfall: 267.8 mm (10.54 in)
Localities around Mindarie
Mercunda	Mantung; Caliph	Caliph
Mercunda; Copeville	Mindarie	Wanbi
Copeville	Halidon	Wanbi

Mindarie is a small town and locality in the Murray Mallee of South Australia between Karoonda and Loxton. It is surrounded by agricultural land, and a population of 32 was recorded for the locality in the 2021 Australian census. The Chinese-owned company Murray Zircon wound up operations at its Mindarie Mineral Sands Mine in 2025, but still owns several exploration leases in the area.

== History ==
The area which is now in the local government area that includes Mindarie was previously occupied by Ngarrindjeri, Peramangk, Ngadjuri, and Wilyakali groups of Aboriginal Australian peoples. According to David Horton's map of Indigenous Australia, Mindarie is situated within the lands of the Ngargad people

Nearly a century after the British colonisation of South Australia, which began in 1836, the Hundred of Mindarie, in the County of Albert, was proclaimed on 26 September 1912.

The post office was opened by F.J. Weber on 24 November 1913 under the name Crecy; it was renamed Mindarie on 1 January 1915. The name "Crecy" came from the Crecy Bore, which was sunk by the E&WS Department in 1912 to supply water to the town, and named after the Battle of Crécy, in which the French army was defeated by the English army in 1346.

The town on Mindarie was gazetted on 25 June 1914, and Mindarie was established as a locality on 11 November 1999.

The name Mindarie is believed to originate from an Aboriginal Australian language word referring to "a peace talk meeting".

Mindarie was a stop on the Barmera railway line, which reached Barmera in 1928. The station, which had a pump shed from 1917, closed in 1974. The water pump was relocated to Pioneer Park in Karoonda.

Mindarie school was founded in 1916, initially being taught in the town institute hall. The school received its own building in 1929, and closed in 1966.

== Governance and demographics ==
Mindarie lies within the state electoral district of Hammond, and, in federal elections, in the Division of Barker. Its local council is the District Council of Karoonda East Murray.

Mindarie's postcode is 5309.

In the 2021 Australian census, 8 households, 3 families, and 32 people were resident in Mindarie. This was a reduction from the previous census, undertaken in August 2016, which reported 38 people.

== Climate ==
Mindarie's climate is classed as BSk : Cold semi-arid (steppe) climate in the Köppen climate classification system. As of 2025, its average maximum temperature is reported as 23.6 Celsius and the minimum as 8.7. Average rainfall was 267.8 mm (10.54 in).

== Facilities and recreation ==
The nearest town is Karoonda, which is 43 km (27 mi) to the south-west of Mindarie.

The Mindarie school has been replaced by East Murray Area School which is located about 10 km (6.2 mi) northwest of Mindarie. It educates about 50 students from Reception to Year 12 in an isolated location.

Together with nearby Halidon, it hosts the Mindarie-Halidon Races in September each year, which is known as the Melbourne Cup of the Mallee.

== Economy ==
=== Agriculture ===
The land around Mindarie is agricultural land.

=== Mining ===
Mindarie is home to the former Mindarie Mineral Sands Mine (or Mindarie Mine) a heavy mineral sands mine owned and operated by Murray Zircon. The mine site, which covers around 2,000 ha (4,900 acres), is on land owned by a local farming family since 1994, called Galga.

The Mindarie Mineral Sands Project was originally developed by Australian Zircon Ltd in 2006, with mining operations starting in October 2007, but the project was placed on hold in October 2009. Murray Zircon was created in June 2011 as a joint venture, with the majority shareholder being the Chinese company Guangdong Orient. In August 2011 rehabilitation works began and were completed in March 2012, with mining beginning the following month. A camp was built to accommodate mine workers. The product (heavy mineral concentrate) was exported to China for processing into the separate elements of zircon, ilmenite, and rutile. As of 2013, Murray Zircon also held exploration tenements covering over 11,000 km^{2} (4,200 sq mi) within the Murray Basin. Australian Zircon had at some point sold their shares to private investors in Hong Kong by then.

By late 2025, mining operations had ceased, and Zircon Murray was removing infrastructure and revegetating the land. However, property owner Kevin Heidrich was concerned about the loss of more than a metre of topsoil (around 10,000 tonne per hectare) that had been lost during the life of the mine would not be replaced. The company still holds four other exploration leases on Heidrich's property.
