= Copeville, South Australia =

Copeville
- Town
- Coordinates: 34°47′51″S 139°50′49″E
- Country: Australia
- State: South Australia
- Region: Murray and Mallee
- LGA: District Council of Karoonda East Murray
- Established: 1 May 1919 (town); 11 November 1999 (locality)

Government
  - State electorate: Hammond
  - Federal division: Barker

Population
  - Total: 34 (2016 census)
- Time zone: UTC+9:30 (ACST)
  - Summer (DST): UTC+10:30 (ACDT)
- Postcode: 5308
- County: Albert
- Mean max temp: 23.6 °C (74.5 °F)
- Mean min temp: 9.3 °C (48.7 °F)
- Annual rainfall: 343 mm (13.5 in)
Localities around Copeville
Nildottie	Bakara; Galga; Mercunda	Mindarie
Nildottie; Claypans	Copeville	Mindarie; Halidon
Bowhill	Perponda; Borrika	Halidon

Copeville is a town and a locality in the Australian state of South Australia.

It was established as a town on the Waikerie railway line, but the line was closed in 1994. The town has since declined. The bulk grain silos are still at the railway station, but do not operate every grain season. There was once a Methodist church in Copeville. It joined the Karoonda circuit in 1966.

The 2016 Australian census which was conducted in August 2016 reports that Copeville had a population of 34 people.

Copeville is located within the federal division of Barker, the state electoral district of Hammond and the local government area of the District Council of Karoonda East Murray.

== See also ==
- Bandon Conservation Park
