= Bakara, South Australia =

Bakara South Australia
- Coordinates: 34°39′27″S 139°46′50″E
- Population: 15 (2016 census)
- Established: 11 November 1999 (locality)
- Postcode(s): 5354
- Time zone: ACST (UTC+9:30)
  - Summer (DST): ACDT (UTC+10:30)
- Location: 112 km (70 mi) NE of Adelaide; 50 km (31 mi) N of Karoonda
- LGA(s): District Council of Karoonda East Murray
- Region: Murray and Mallee
- County: Albert
- State electorate(s): Hammond
- Federal division(s): Barker
Mean max temp	Mean min temp	Annual rainfall
23.6 °C; 74 °F	8.7 °C; 48 °F	271.1 mm 10.7 in
Suburbs around Bakara:
Swan Reach	Bakara Well	Bakara Well
Swan Reach; Nildottie	Bakara	Galga
Nildottie	Copeville	Copeville
- Footnotes: Locations; Adjoining localities

Bakara is a rural locality in the District Council of Karoonda East Murray of the Murray and Mallee region of South Australia which was established on 11 November 1999.

The 2016 Australian census which was conducted in August 2016 reports that Bakara had a population of 15 people.

Bakara is located in the local government area of District Council of Karoonda East Murray, the state electoral district of Hammond and the federal Division of Barker.

== See also ==
- Bakara Conservation Park
