= Mindarie =

Mindarie may refer to:

- Mindarie, South Australia
- Mindarie, Western Australia
- Electoral district of Mindarie, Western Australia
