= Borrika, South Australia =

Borrika
- Town
- Coordinates: 35°01′26″S 140°02′58″E
- Country: Australia
- State: South Australia
- Region: Murray and Mallee
- LGA: District Council of Karoonda East Murray
- Location: 132 km (82 mi) E of Adelaide; 16 km (9.9 mi) northeast of Karoonda
- Established: 2 April 1914 (town); 11 November 1999 (locality)

Government
  - State electorate: Hammond
  - Federal division: Barker
- Elevation: 55 m (180 ft)

Population
  - Total: 42 (2016 census)
- Time zone: UTC+9:30 (ACST)
  - Summer (DST): UTC+10:30 (ACDT)
- Postcode: 5309
- County: Buccleuch
- Mean max temp: 23.6 °C (74.5 °F)
- Mean min temp: 9.3 °C (48.7 °F)
- Annual rainfall: 343.0 mm (13.50 in)
Localities around Borrika
Copeville	Copeville	Halidon
Perponda; Karoonda	Borrika	Halidon; Sandalwood
Karoonda	Karoonda; Marama	Marama

Borrika is a town and locality in South Australia. It is on the Karoonda Highway 16 kilometres (9.9 mi) east of Karoonda, and was on the Barmera railway line (opened 1913), later known as the Loxton railway line when the end of the main line closed but the Loxton branch remained open until 2015 and has now also closed.

The 2016 Australian census which was conducted in August 2016 reports that Borrika had a population of 42 people. The 2021 Australian census reported a population of 30.

Borrika is located in the local government area of District Council of Karoonda East Murray, the state electoral district of Hammond and the federal Division of Barker.
