= Meribah railway station =

Former railway station in South Australia, Australia

Meribah

General information
- Location: Railway Terrace, Meribah, South Australia
- Operator: Australian National
- Line: Barmera line
- Platforms: 1
- Tracks: 1

Construction
- Structure type: Ground

Other information
- Status: Demolished

History
- Opened: May 1913
- Closed: 1990

Services
Preceding station	Australian National Railways Commission	Following station
Paruna towards Adelaide	Barmera railway line	Nadda towards Barmera

Meribah railway station was located on the Barmera railway line. It served the settlement of Meribah, South Australia.

== History ==
Meribah railway station originally opened as the short-lived terminus of the Brown's Well railway line in the Murray Mallee in May 1913. Almost as soon as the line opened to Meribah, it was extended north to the Murray River at Paringa. The town of Meribah was established in 1914 along the then newly opened railway line. The railway through Meribah closed in 1990; there is no longer any trace of the station.
