= Copeville =

Copeville may refer to:

- Copeville, Texas, an unincorporated community in the United States
- Copeville, South Australia, a town
