= Murray Mallee =

Coordinates: 35°S 140°E

- Region
- Country: Australia
- State: South Australia
- LGAs: District Council of Loxton Waikerie; District Council of Karoonda East Murray; Southern Mallee District Council; The Coorong District Council

Government
  - State electorate: Chaffey; Hammond; MacKillop
  - Federal division: Barker

Area
  - Total: 20,000 km^{2} (7,700 sq mi)

The Murray Mallee is a grain-growing and sheep-farming area in the east of the Australian state of South Australia. The name is not formally designated but is widely used to refer to an area of approximately 20,000 square kilometres (7700 square miles) bounded by the River Murray (Note: The Government of South Australia stipulates "River" to be placed first when referring to the two major rivers of the state, the River Murray and River Torrens. Usage outside of South Australia is generally to place "River" last.) on its northern and western sides, the Victorian border on its eastern side, and up to about 50 kilometres (30 miles) south of the Mallee Highway.

The formal designated name for approximately the same region is Murraylands.

== Details ==
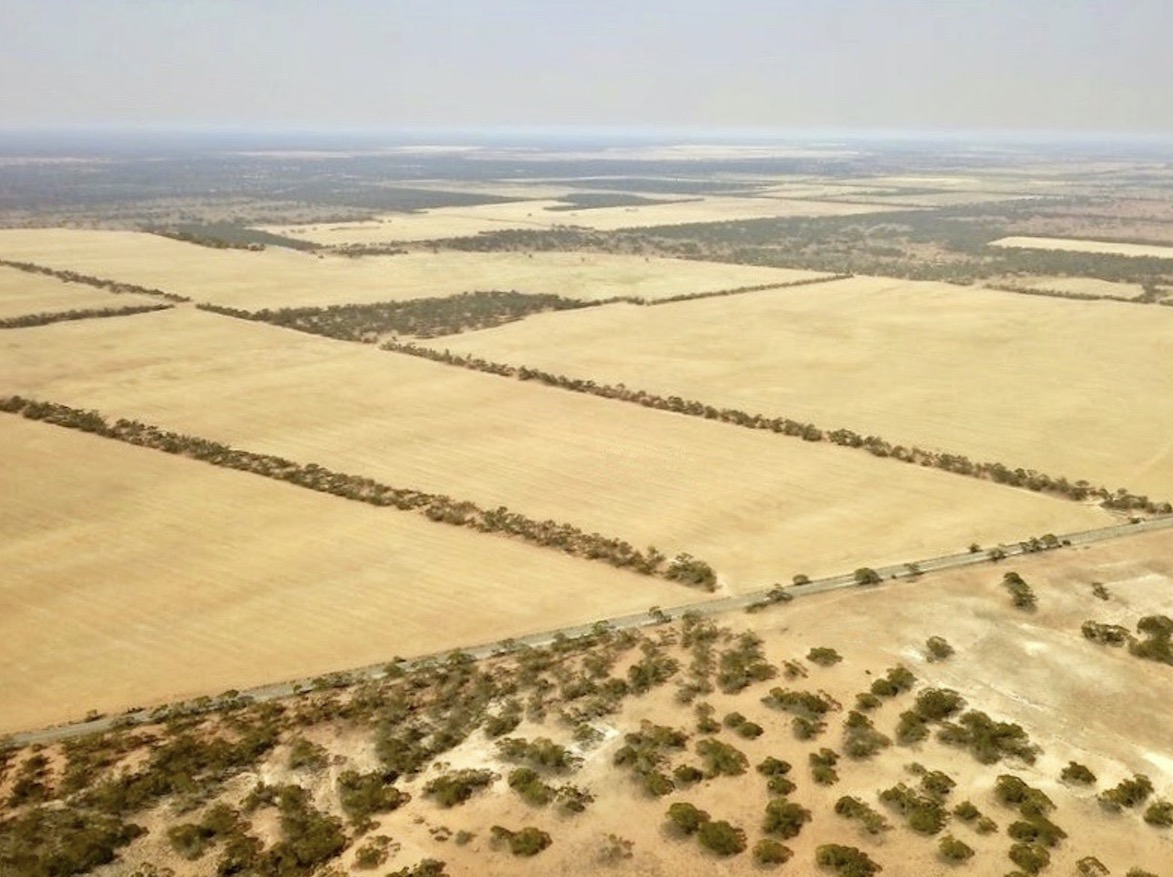
The Murray Mallee's topography is mainly flat, punctuated with gentle undulating sandy rises

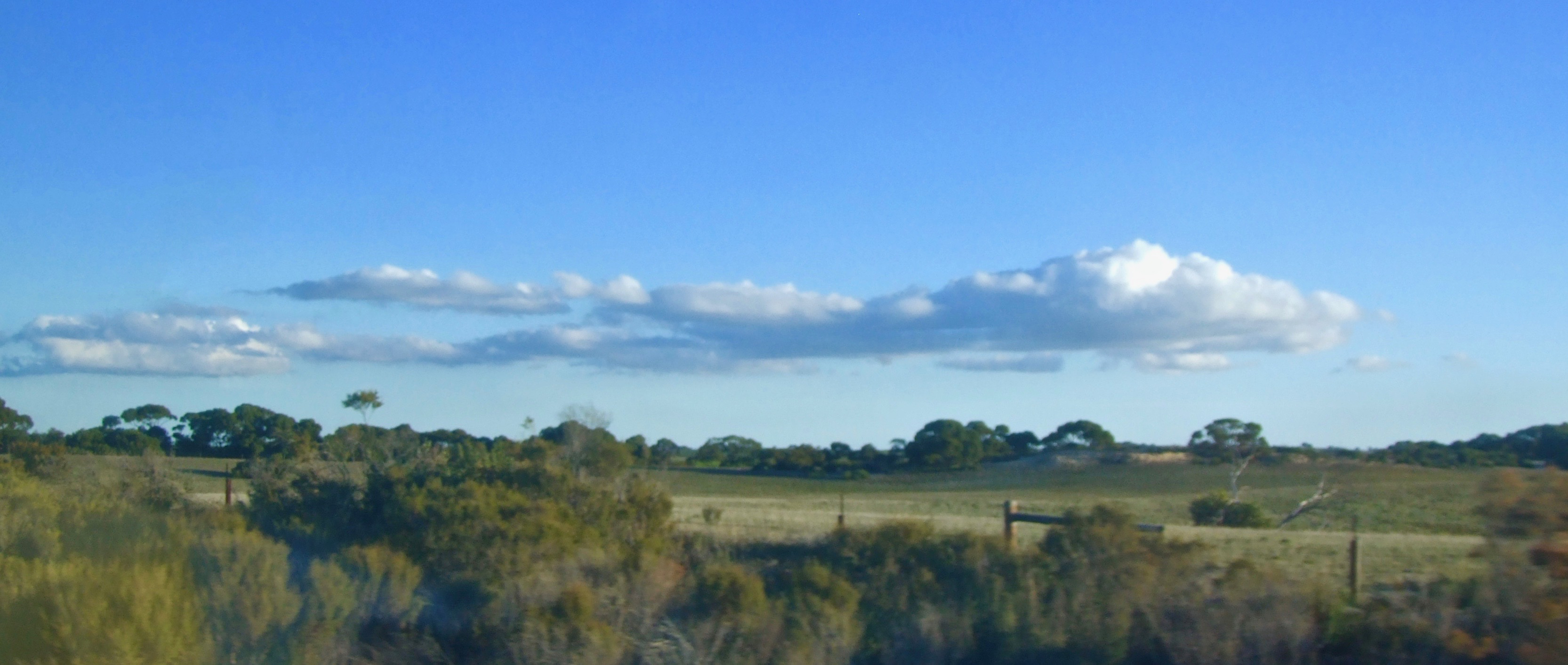
Murray Mallee country in winter

The Murray Mallee area is predominantly a vast plain of low elevation, with sandhills and gentle undulating sandy rises, interspersed by flats. The annual rainfall ranges from approximately 250 millimetres (9.8 inches) in the north to 400 millimetres (16 inches) further south.

Early European explorers described it as barren, desert country. The area was very lightly populated, with marginal pastoral runs of sheep at low stocking rates, until the beginning of the 20th century. Artesian water was discovered at moderate depth, and 707 kilometres (439 miles) of railways were opened, mainly in the 1910s, to make shipping of grain economically feasible.

The first railway was the Pinnaroo line in 1906 from Tailem Bend on the main Melbourne–Adelaide railway. The success of this line led to construction in 1913 of the Barmera railway line, curtailed at that stage on the south bank of the Murray at Paringa. Before that line had been completed, the government approved a number of lines from it. These included the Peebinga railway line into the land between the new line and the Pinnaroo line, and lines to Loxton and Waikerie. Finally, the Yinkanie railway line, opened in 1925. All lines have now closed due to the declining use of railways for grain transport in the area.

== Towns ==
The main towns in the Murray Mallee are Karoonda, Lameroo and Pinnaroo. Towns along the River Murray are generally considered to be in the Riverland or Murraylands, rather than the Mallee.

== Ecology ==
Originally the Murray Mallee was covered in thick mallee scrub. Large expanses – estimates are about 80% – of the mallee country were cleared for agricultural development, beginning as early as the 1880s. Most of the remaining natural vegetation is in protected areas such as Ngarkat Conservation Park, Billiatt Conservation Park, Karte Conservation Park, Peebinga Conservation Park, Bakara Conservation Park and Lowan Conservation Park.

== See also ==
- Ninety Mile Desert
