= Halidon, South Australia =

Halidon South Australia
- Coordinates: 34°52′41″S 140°10′20″E
- Population: 18 (2016 census)
- Established: 25 June 1914 (town); 11 November 1999 (locality)
- Postcode(s): 5309
- Time zone: ACST (UTC+9:30)
  - Summer (DST): ACDT (UTC+10:30)
- Location: 144 km (89 mi) E of Adelaide
- LGA(s): District Council of Karoonda East Murray
- Region: Murray and Mallee
- County: Buccleuch; Albert
- State electorate(s): Hammond
- Federal division(s): Barker
Mean max temp	Mean min temp	Annual rainfall
23.6 °C; 74 °F	8.7 °C; 48 °F	271.1 mm 10.7 in
Localities around Halidon:
Copeville	Mindarie; Wanbi	Wanbi
Copeville; Borrika	Halidon	Wanbi; Sandalwood
Borrika	Sandalwood	Sandalwood
- Footnotes: Locations; Adjoining localities

Halidon is a town and locality in the Australian state of South Australia located about 144 kilometres (89 mi) east of the state capital of Adelaide.

It was gazetted as a town on 25 June 1914 and boundaries for the locality were gazetted on 11 November 1999.

The 2016 Australian census reported that Halidon had a population of 18 people.

Halidon is located in the local government area of District Council of Karoonda East Murray, the state electoral district of Hammond and the federal Division of Barker.
