= Karoonda meteorite =

1930 South Australian meteorite

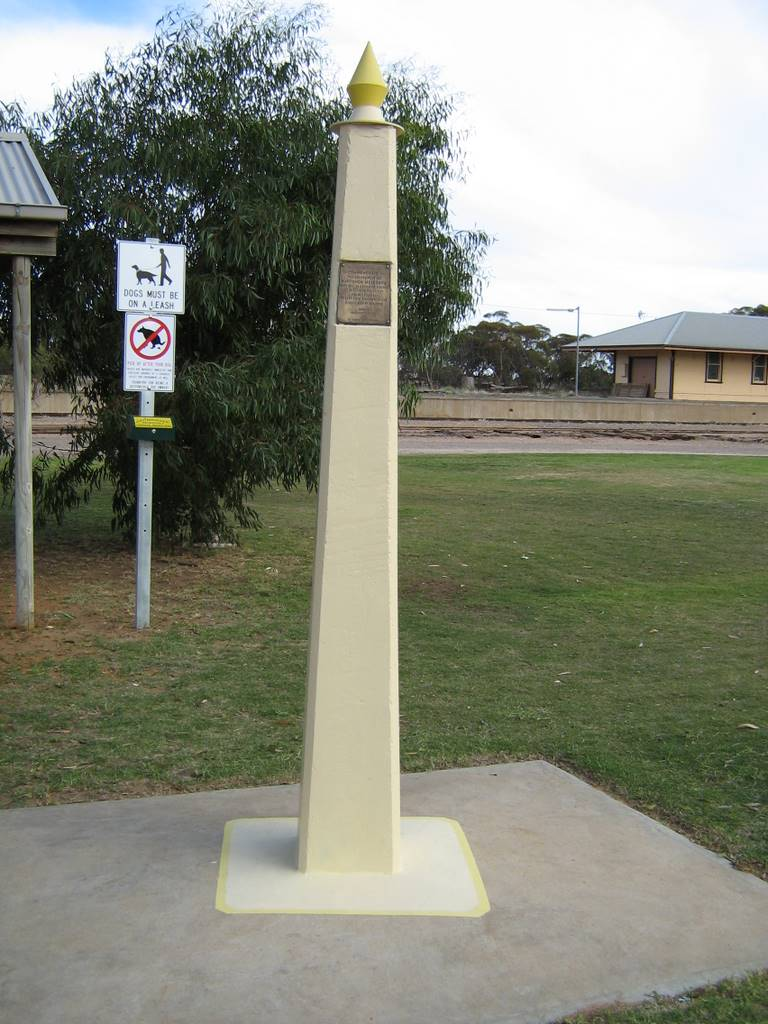
- Karoonda meteorite commemorative column
- Type: Chondrite
- Group: CK
- Country: Australia
- Region: Murray and Mallee
- Coordinates: 35°06′S 139°56′E
- Observed fall: Yes
- Fall date: 25 November 1930
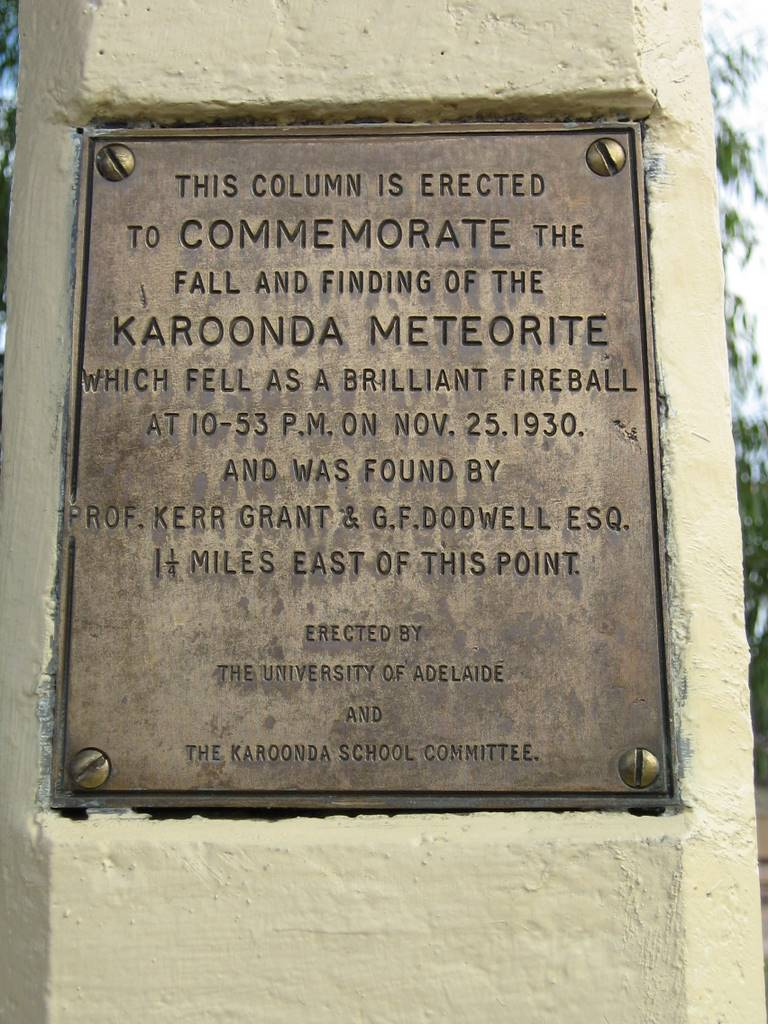
- Karoonda meteorite commemorative plaque

The Karoonda meteorite is a meteorite that fell to earth on 25 November 1930 at 10:53 pm near the South Australian town of Karoonda. It is of a rare composition, being carbonaceous chondrite, and is also rare in that it was found so soon after its landing. Several fragments are now held in the South Australian Museum in Adelaide.

== The fall and discovery ==
On 25 November 1930, the meteorite was seen falling through the sky from the Eyre Peninsula in the west to the middle of Victoria in the east. Adelaide residents reported a "huge ball of fire with a flaming tail" shooting across the eastern sky. Some reported that the colour of the flames changed from brilliant red, to pale blue to sickly yellow. Other witnesses recalled its effect as "turning light into day". Witnesses closer to Karoonda reported that a loud detonation followed by a low rumbling like thunder was heard shortly after the meteorite passed overhead.

It landed at 10:53 pm near Karoonda.

The meteorite was found on 9 December by a search party headed by Professor Kerr Grant of the University of Adelaide and state government astronomer George Dodwell, who led a team of students. They collected information from locals and then searched an area of radius 3 miles (5 km). The remains of the object were found about 2 feet (0.6 m) underground, in a crater about 2 feet (0.6 m) in diameter. It had shattered on impact, owing to its composition, causing the town to shake on impact. News of the meteorite spread worldwide.

== Composition and rarity ==
It turned out to be of a very rare type, composed mainly of iron silicates, later classified as a "chondritic asiderite". After all fragments had been collected, they weighed 41.73 kg (92.0 lb) in total. It was composed of a mixture of minerals, including magnesium, iron and nickel. Stony meteorites are relatively rare, and the fact that it is a carbonaceous chondrite, meaning that it contains carbon, adds to its rarity. This type is only present in around 4.6% of meteorites found. The CK chondrites, a group of carbonaceous chondrite (which are a class of chondritic meteorite) were named for this meteorite.

To add to its rarity value, it is one of very few meteorites to be found soon after falling, having been found within a couple of weeks.

== Commemorative obelisk ==
On 27 May 1932 a commemorative obelisk and plaque were unveiled at Karoonda by Professor Grant and his wife. It is believed to be the first commemoration of a meteorite's landing, and is situated in the RSL Park on Railway Terrace. The plaque reads:

This column is erected to commemorate the fall and finding of the Karoonda Meteorite which fell as brilliant fire-ball at 10.53 pm. on November 25, 1930, and was found by Professor Kerr Grant and G.F. Dodwell Esq., 1¾ miles east of this spot. Erected by the University at Adelaide and Karoonda school committee.

== Preservation ==
Some pieces of the meteorite were sent to the South Australian Museum for display soon afterwards, with the local council, now the District Council of Karoonda East Murray, was given one of the largest fragments. However in October 2022 the council decided to send this valuable fragment of the meteorite to the museum, as it was too costly and very difficult to insure, partly because its value was so hard to calculate. Even tiny pieces weighing less than a gram can sell for around A$100. The council retains ownership, but the museum will be responsible for its care and protection.

== See also ==
- Glossary of meteoritics
