= Bandon Conservation Park =

Protected area in South Australia

- IUCN category VI (protected area with sustainable use of natural resources)
- Location within South Australia
- Location: South Australia
- Nearest city: Copeville
- Coordinates: 34°48′34″S 140°01′26″E
- Area: 6.50 km^{2} (2.51 sq mi)
- Established: 22 August 2013
- Governing body: Department for Environment and Water

Bandon Conservation Park is a protected area located in the Australian state of South Australia in the locality of Copeville about 130 kilometres (81 mi) east of the state capital of Adelaide and about 16 kilometres (9.9 mi) east of the town of Copeville.

The conservation park consists of crown land described as "Allotment 11 in Deposited Plan 33335" in the cadastral unit of the Hundred of Bandon. It came into existence on 22 August 2013 by proclamation under the National Parks and Wildlife Act 1972. It is named after the Hundred of Bandon. A separate proclamation on 22 August 2013 ensured the continuation of "existing rights of entry, prospecting, exploration or mining" regarding the land under the Mining Act 1971 and the Petroleum and Geothermal Energy Act 2000. As of 2016, it covered an area of 6.50 square kilometres (2.51 sq mi).

The conservation park is classified as an IUCN Category VI protected area.

== See also ==
- Protected areas of South Australia
