= Barmera railway line =

Former railway line in South Australia, Australia

Overview
- Status: Closed and removed
- Locale: Murraylands
- Termini: Tailem Bend; Barmera
- Continues from: Adelaide-Wolseley line

Service
- System: South Australian Railways
- Operator(s): South Australian Railways: 1913-1978; Australian National: 1978-1990

History
- Opened: Tailem Bend-Wanbi: 6 January 1913; Wanbi-Paruna: 1 May 1913; Paruna-Meribah: 7 May 1913; Meribah-Paringa: 2 October 1913; Paringa-Renmark: 1927; Renmark-Barmera: 1 August 1928
- Closed: 1990

Technical
- Track gauge: 1,600 mm (5 ft 3 in)

The six railway lines of the Murraylands
Order built	Line	Year opened	Year closed	Length (km)	Length (mi)
1	Tailem Bend–Pinnaroo	1906	2015^{[note a]}	145.3	90.3
2	Tailem Bend–Barmera	1913 / 1928^{[note b]}	1996^{[note c]}	256.6	159.5
3	Karoonda–Peebinga	1914	1990	106.2	66.0
4	Karoonda–Waikerie	1914	1994^{[note d]}	118.7	73.8
5	Alawoona–Loxton	1914	2015^{[note e]}	35.5	22.0
6	Wanbi–Yinkanie	1925	1971	50.6	31.5
Total				712.9	443.1
Notes: 1. Previously a broad-gauge through line into Victoria, the line was closed at the border in 1996 before being converted to standard gauge in 1998.; 2. Construction of the Barmera line was paused at Paringa in 1913 pending funding of a bridge over the River Murray. The line was completed to Barmera in 1928. A branch line was built to support construction of the proposed Chowilla Dam in 1966–67. Some 27.3 kilometres (17.0 miles) long, it branched from the Barmera line 8 kilometres (5 miles) south of Paringa and proceeded to Murtho on the south bank of the River Murray. Construction of the dam was deferred in 1967 and subsequently cancelled; later the line was removed without being officially opened.; 3. Paringa–Barmera closed in 1984; Alawoona–Paringa closed in 1990; Tailem Bend–Alawoona closed in 1996.; 4. Galga–Waikerie closed in 1990.; 5. Converted to standard gauge in 1996.

The Barmera railway line was the second railway built to develop the Murray Mallee region of South Australia, in 1913. It followed the success of the Pinnaroo railway line in 1906. Both lines branched east from Tailem Bend to the north of the main Melbourne–Adelaide railway. The Brown's Well line was the more northerly, and extended into country which had not been developed much before the railway, partly due to the absence of any viable transport route for produce. The original terminus of the Brown's Well railway was at Meribah, not far from the Victorian border.

Such was the optimism about this region, that three lines from the Brown's Well line to the Murray River, and an additional line between it and the Pinnaroo line, were approved even before it was completed. It was extended further to Renmark and Barmera in the 1920s, along with construction of another spur from Wanbi to near Moorook in 1925.

== Route ==
The initial sidings and mileages from Adelaide were:—Tailem Bend, 75¼ miles; Naturi, 84½; Kulde, 89½; Wynarka, 95¼; Karoonda, 105¼; Lowalde, 111½; Borrika, 115½; Halidon, 128¼; Wanbi, 139¼; Alawoona, 151¾; Paruna, 164¾; Meribah, 172. As the locomotives were powered by steam, reliable water supplies were required as well. There are no significant rivers or lakes in the Mallee, so government bores and tanks were required. The following bores were available on the Brown's Well railway: Yalwarra bore, at 14½ miles (bad water, not suitable for railway use); Wynarka, 20 miles; Karoonda, 29 miles 66 chains; Borrika, 40 miles; Sandalwood, 47 miles 43 chains; Halidon, 55 miles 19 chains; Crecy, 58 miles 20 chains; Wanbi, 64 miles 60 chains; Cobera, 71 miles; Alawoona, 76 miles, 22 chains; Wolowa, 84 miles; Meribah, 96 miles 64 chains. The bores were situated at an average distance of 7 miles apart.

Part of the Barmera line plus most of the Loxton railway line spur from Alawoona were converted to standard gauge and remained as the Loxton line, used to carry part of the seasonal grain harvest. The section from Barmera to Alawoona closed in 1990. The Loxton line closed on 20 July 2015, with all grain traffic now taken by road.

== Extensions ==
Almost as soon as the railway to the Brown's Well district had been completed to Meribah (May 1913), it was extended 40 miles (64 km) north to the Murray River at Paringa. The extension was approved before the original length had been completed, with an additional cost estimate of £135,750 to serve an additional 296,000 acres (1,200 km^{2}). The official opening to Paringa was on 2 October 1913. The intervention of World War I delayed the construction of the Paringa Bridge to extend the railway to Renmark until 1927. Later it was extended to Barmera; the first passenger service ran on 1 August 1928.

In the 1960s, a branch line was built which joined the main line south of Paringa, near the Wonuarra siding. It was 27.3 kilometres (17.0 mi) long, and went north-east to Murtho on the south bank of the River Murray. It was built to support construction of the proposed Chowilla Dam. The dam construction was cancelled in 1967 and never built. The railway line was removed without being used.

== See also ==
- Rail transport in South Australia#Branches from the Melbourne line
