= Pinnaroo railway line, South Australia =

Former railway line in South Australia

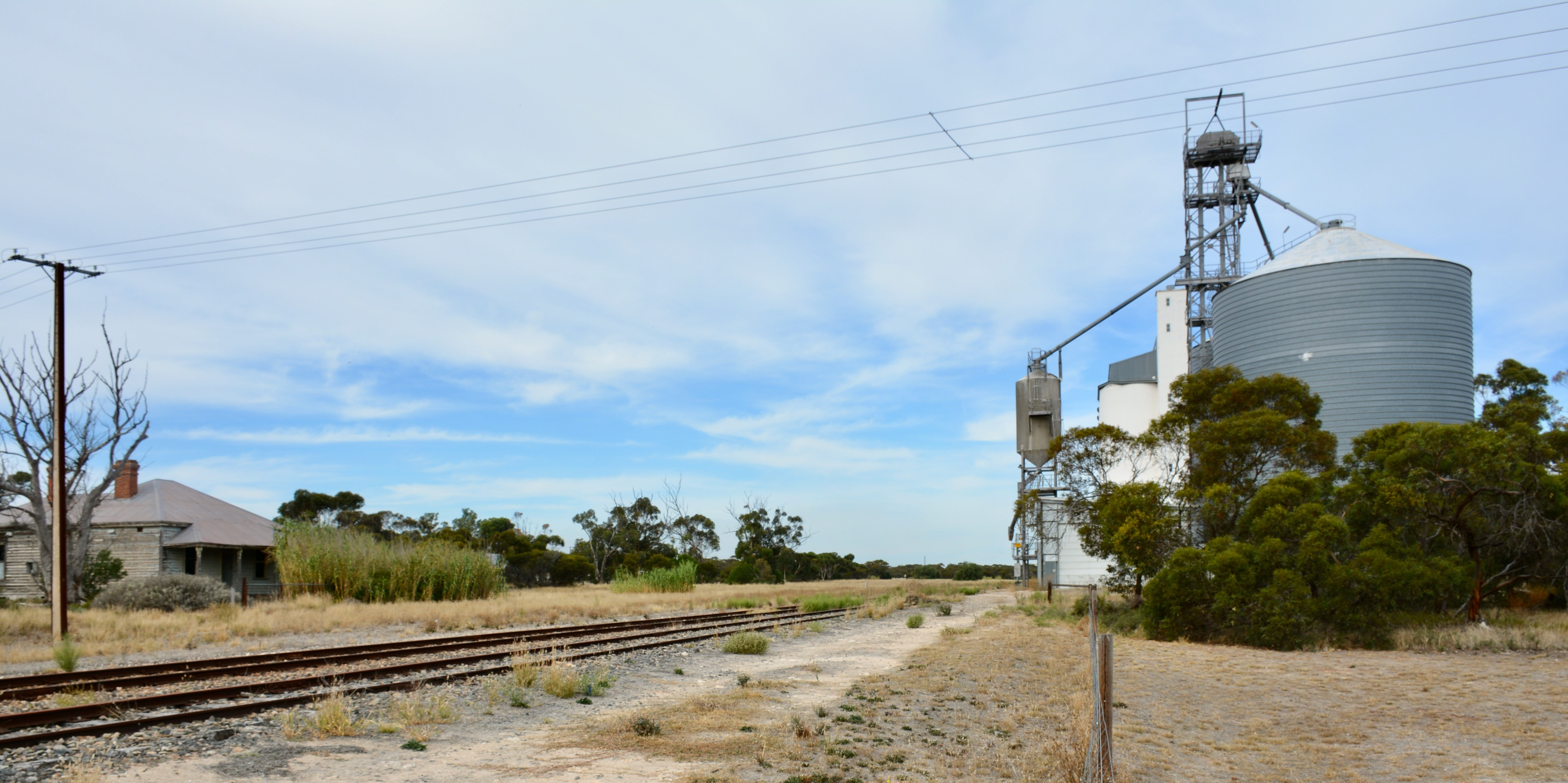
- The Pinnaroo railway line at the former station of Peake

Overview
- Status: Open, disused
- Owner: Aurizon
- Locale: Murraylands
- Coordinates: 35°23′S 140°8′E
- Termini: Tailem Bend; Pinnaroo

Service
- Operator(s): South Australian Railways to 1978; Australian National Railways Commission from 1978

History
- Opened: 14 September 1906
- Closed: 31 July 2015

Technical
- Line length: 145.3 km (90.3 mi)
- Number of tracks: 1
- Track gauge: 1435 mm (4 ft 8 1/2 in)
- Old gauge: 1600 mm (5 ft 3 in)

The Pinnaroo railway line is a closed, but as of 2024 intact, railway line in South Australia. It branches off the Adelaide-Wolseley line at Tailem Bend and extends 145.3 kilometres (90.3 miles) to the Victorian state border, 6.0 kilometres (3.7 miles) beyond Pinnaroo.

The six railway lines of the Murraylands
| Order built | Line | Year opened | Year closed | Length (mi) | Length (km) |
| 1 | Tailem Bend–Pinnaroo | 1906 | 2015^{[note a]} | 86.6 | 139.4 |
| 2 | Tailem Bend–Barmera | 1913 / 1928^{[note b]} | 1996^{[note c]} | 159.5 | 256.6 |
| 3 | Karoonda–Peebinga | 1914 | 1990 | 66.0 | 106.2 |
| 4 | Karoonda–Waikerie | 1914 | 1994^{[note d]} | 73.8 | 118.7 |
| 5 | Alawoona–Loxton | 1914 | 2015^{[note e]} | 22.0 | 35.5 |
| 6 | Wanbi–Yinkanie | 1925 | 1971 | 31.5 | 50.6 |
| Total | | | | 439.4 | 707.0 |
Notes: 1. Previously a broad-gauge through line into Victoria, the line was closed at the border in 1996 before being converted to standard gauge in 1998.; 2. Construction of the Barmera line was paused at Paringa in 1913 pending funding of a bridge over the River Murray. The line was completed to Barmera in 1928. A branch line was built to support construction of the proposed Chowilla Dam in 1966–67. Some 27.3 kilometres (17.0 miles) long, it branched from the Barmera line 8 kilometres (5 miles) south of Paringa and proceeded to Murtho on the south bank of the River Murray. Construction of the dam was deferred in 1967 and subsequently cancelled; later the line was removed without being used.; 3. Paringa–Barmera closed in 1984; Alawoona–Paringa closed in 1990; Tailem Bend–Alawoona closed in 1996.; 4. Galga–Waikerie closed in 1990.; 5. Converted to standard gauge in 1996.

== History ==
The line opened from Tailem Bend to Pinnaroo on 14 September 1906, being extended to the state border on 29 July 1915.

When the Adelaide to Wolseley line was closed east of Tailem Bend for gauge conversion, the Pinnaroo line became part of the main line between Adelaide and Melbourne for two weeks in April 1995. Journey times increased by 10 to 12 hours.

In May 1995, it was announced that the line west of Pinnaroo would be gauge converted from broad gauge to standard gauge. Work on the conversion of the line was delayed until 1996, due to a large grain crop and increased traffic by trains destined for Tocumwal and Yarrawonga in regional Victoria that were on the broad gauge network.

A small part of the line converted in 1996, was converted back for the 1997 grain harvest. To continue the journey to Adelaide, the grain was transshipped at Tailem Bend. The last broad gauge train operated on 2 July 1998 with the line reopening on 25 November 1998. As the Victorian line remained broad gauge, trains could no longer operate over the entire length with Pinnaroo becoming a break of gauge point.

On 1 November 1997, Australian Southern Railroad acquired a 50-year lease on the rail corridor and total ownership of the rail infrastructure as part of Australian National's South Australian freight assets sale to ASR.

The line became disused in July 2015 after Viterra announced that no more grain would be carried by rail after 31 July 2015, with the 2015 harvest to be entirely transported by road. As the South Australian line became disused, the Victorian government was upgrading part of its end of the line for regional freight. The lease of the land and ownership of the rail infrastructure passed to Aurizon in 2022, following their purchase of One Rail Australia (the final successor of Australian Southern Railroad).

Aurizon lists the line as open, but it is not currently used by any trains.
