= Tailem Bend railway station =

Former railway station in South Australia, Australia

Tailem Bend
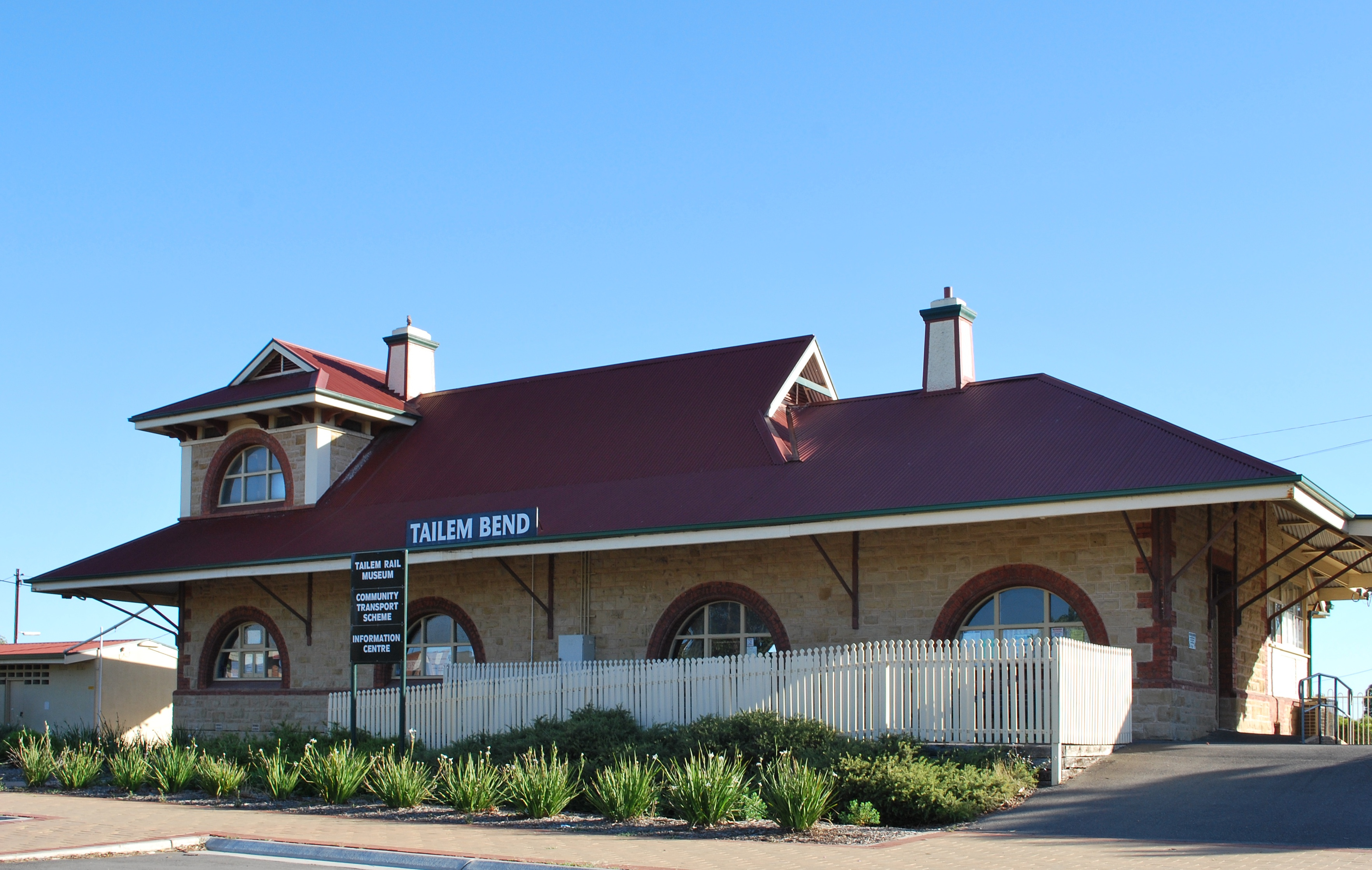
- Station front in January 2010

General information
- Location: Railway Terrace, Tailem Bend
- Coordinates: 35°15′18″S 139°27′23″E
- System: Former Australian National regional rail
- Operator: South Australian Railways 1886 - 1978 Australian National 1978 - 1997 Great Southern Rail 1997-1999
- Lines: Adelaide-Wolseley; Loxton; Pinnaroo
- Distance: 120.50 kilometres from Adelaide
- Platforms: 1

Construction
- Structure type: Ground

Other information
- Status: Closed to passenger services, now used as a museum

History
- Opened: 1 May 1886
- Closed: May 1999
- Rebuilt: 7 October 1913

Services
Preceding station	Australian Rail Track Corporation	Following station
Monteith towards Adelaide	Adelaide–Wolseley railway line	Cooke Plains towards Serviceton
Preceding station	Aurizon	Following station
Terminus	Loxton railway line	Naturi towards Loxton
Terminus	Pinnaroo railway line, South Australia	Moorlands towards Panitya
Location

Tailem Bend railway station is located on the Adelaide-Wolseley line in Tailem Bend, South Australia. It is also the junction point for the Loxton and Pinnaroo lines.

== History ==
Tailem Bend station opened on 1 May 1886 as a station on the Nairne-Bordertown extension of what became the Adelaide-Wolseley line. It became a junction station with the Pinnaroo line constructed in 1906 and the Brown's Well line in 1913. The Brown's Well line was eventually extended to Barmera in 1928, and had several branches with trains that operated back to Tailem Bend. Trains on the Peebinga, Loxton, Moorook and Waikerie lines all passed through Tailem Bend. All were built as broad gauge lines. The current station was opened on 7 October 1913. On 27 June 1926, locomotive servicing facilities were opened including a roundhouse.

In 1995, as part of the One Nation program the Adelaide-Wolseley line was converted to standard gauge, and Tailem Bend became a break of gauge station until 1998, when the remaining broad gauge branch lines to Pinnaroo and Loxton were converted to standard gauge. In May 1999, the station closed when The Overland, then operated by Great Southern Rail began operating on a new timetable that skipped multiple stations including Tailem Bend. On 22 May 2005, it was restored and reopened as a museum. The two remaining branch lines out of Tailem Bend, the Loxton and Pinnaroo lines closed in 2015 after grain train operations on those lines ceased. The Viterra owned grain silos and bunkers in Tailem Bend are still served by rail.
