= Waikerie railway line =

Former railway line in South Australia

Overview
- Status: Closed and removed
- Termini: Karoonda; Waikerie
- Continues from: Barmera line

Service
- System: South Australian Railways
- Operator(s): South Australian Railways; Australian National

History
- Opened: 23 September 1914
- Closed: Galga–Waikerie:14 March 1990; Karoonda–Galga: 4 March 1994

Technical
- Line length: 119.0 km (73.9 mi)
- Track gauge: 1600 mm (5 ft 3 in)

The six railway lines of the Murraylands
Order built	Line	Year opened	Year closed	Length (mi)	Length (km)
1	Tailem Bend–Pinnaroo	1906	2015^{[note a]}	86.6	139.4
2	Tailem Bend–Barmera	1913 / 1928^{[note b]}	1996^{[note c]}	159.5	256.6
3	Karoonda–Peebinga	1914	1990	66.0	106.2
4	Karoonda–Waikerie	1914	1994^{[note d]}	73.8	118.7
5	Alawoona–Loxton	1914	2015^{[note e]}	22.0	35.5
6	Wanbi–Yinkanie	1925	1971	31.5	50.6
Total				439.4	707.0
Notes: 1. Previously a broad-gauge through line into Victoria, the line was closed at the border in 1996 before being converted to standard gauge in 1998.; 2. Construction of the Barmera line was paused at Paringa in 1913 pending funding of a bridge over the River Murray. The line was completed to Barmera in 1928. A branch line was built to support construction of the proposed Chowilla Dam in 1966–67. Some 27.3 kilometres (17.0 miles) long, it branched from the Barmera line 8 kilometres (5 miles) south of Paringa and proceeded to Murtho on the south bank of the River Murray. Construction of the dam was deferred in 1967 and subsequently cancelled; later the line was removed without being used.; 3. Paringa–Barmera closed in 1984; Alawoona–Paringa closed in 1990; Tailem Bend–Alawoona closed in 1996.; 4. Galga–Waikerie closed in 1990.; 5. Converted to standard gauge in 1996.

The Waikerie railway line was a railway line on the South Australian Railways network.

== Route ==
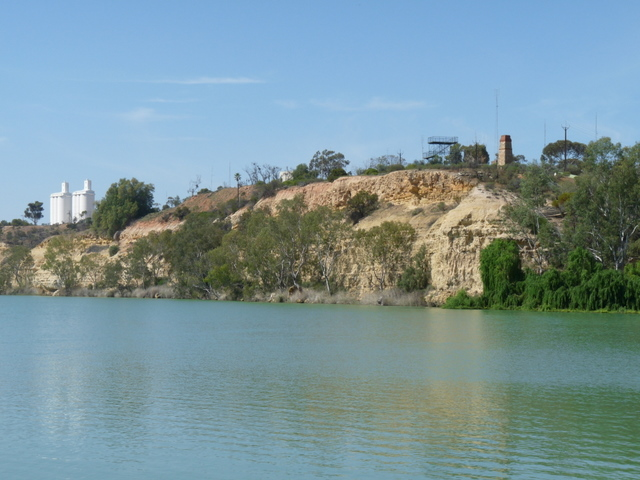
The northern terminus was near the silos at left of picture.

The Waikerie railway line branched from the Barmera railway line at Karoonda, which was also the junction for the Peebinga railway line on the other side of the main line. It extended north, north-east, and north again to Waikerie, on the cliffs above the River Murray. (Note: The Government of South Australia stipulates "River" to be placed first when referring to the two major rivers of the state, the River Murray and River Torrens. Outside of South Australia this convention is not generally followed.)

== History ==
Before construction started on the Waikerie railway, there was active discussion about where it should branch from the Barmera or Adelaide-Wolseley line. Eventually, the decision was made that it should branch from Karoonda at the 30-mile siding from Tailem Bend. Other possible branching points at that stage included the 40-mile (Borrika) and 58½ miles (Mindarie) from Tailem Bend. There was also a proposal to branch from the 20-mile mark (Wynarka). The line opened on 23 September 1914.

The Waikerie line was part of a significant expansion of the railways in South Australia in the early part of the 20th century to facilitate greater development of the rural areas of the state. The estimated cost of the 74 miles (119 km) Karoonda-Waikerie line, including rolling stock, was £251,350, with expected revenue of £10,000 per annum, working expenses of £10,820, and interest costs of £10,054. It was anticipated by the Railways Commissioner that the loss here would be £10,874 per annum. The area to be served was estimated at 956,000 acres (387,000 ha). The contract for the first 19.5 miles (31.4 km) was accepted for £16,220 in January 1914. The Galga to Waikerie section closed on 14 March 1990, followed by the Karoonda-Galga section on 4 March 1994.

== See also ==
- Rail transport in South Australia
