= Loxton railway line =

Former railway line in South Australia

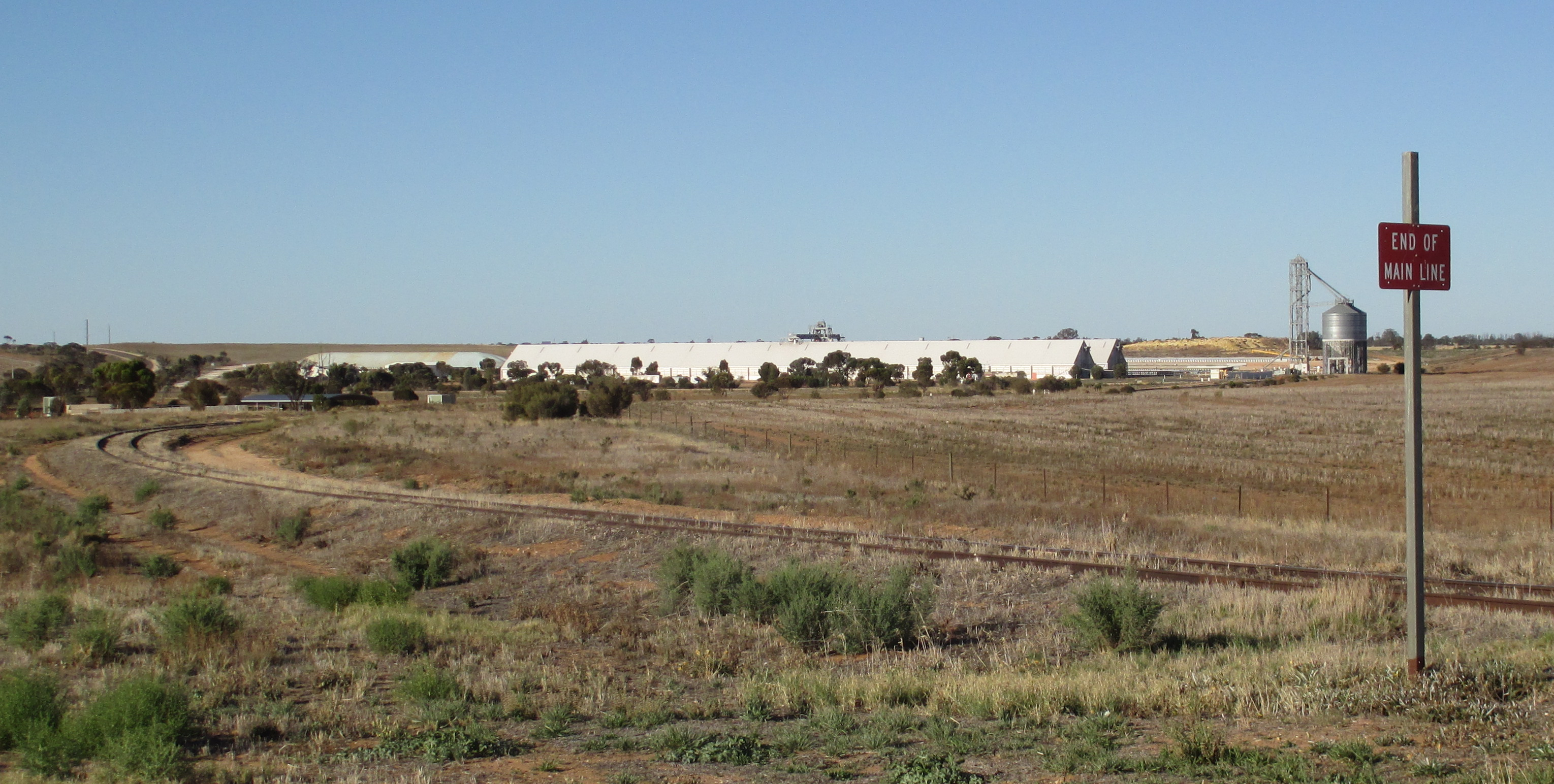
- Tookayerta grain terminal at the end of the line

Overview
- Status: No trains operating
- Locale: Murraylands
- Coordinates: 34°58′15″S 140°5′30″E
- Termini: Tailem Bend; Loxton

History
- Opened: 2 February 1914
- Converted to standard gauge: 1996
- Closed: 20 July 2015

Technical
- Line length: 271 km (168 mi)(Tailem Bend–Tookayerta)
- Number of tracks: 1
- Track gauge: 1435 mm (4 ft 8 1/2 in)
- Old gauge: 1600 mm (5 ft 3 in)

The Loxton railway line is a closed railway line in the northern Murray Mallee region of South Australia. It ran north-east from Tailem Bend to grain silos near Loxton.

The six railway lines of the Murraylands
Order built	Line	Year opened	Year closed	Length (mi)	Length (km)
1	Tailem Bend–Pinnaroo	1906	2015^{[note a]}	86.6	139.4
2	Tailem Bend–Barmera	1913 / 1928^{[note b]}	1996^{[note c]}	159.5	256.6
3	Karoonda–Peebinga	1914	1990	66.0	106.2
4	Karoonda–Waikerie	1914	1994^{[note d]}	73.8	118.7
5	Alawoona–Loxton	1914	2015^{[note e]}	22.0	35.5
6	Wanbi–Yinkanie	1925	1971	31.5	50.6
Total				439.4	707.0
Notes: 1. Previously a broad-gauge through line into Victoria, the line was closed at the border in 1996 before being converted to standard gauge in 1998.; 2. Construction of the Barmera line was paused at Paringa in 1913 pending funding of a bridge over the River Murray. The line was completed to Barmera in 1928. A branch line was built to support construction of the proposed Chowilla Dam in 1966–67. Some 27.3 kilometres (17.0 miles) long, it branched from the Barmera line 8 kilometres (5 miles) south of Paringa and proceeded to Murtho on the south bank of the River Murray. Construction of the dam was deferred in 1967 and subsequently cancelled; later the line was removed without being used.; 3. Paringa–Barmera closed in 1984; Alawoona–Paringa closed in 1990; Tailem Bend–Alawoona closed in 1996.; 4. Galga–Waikerie closed in 1990.; 5. Converted to standard gauge in 1996.

== History ==
The first stage of the Brown's Well railway line opened from Tailem Bend to Wanbi on 6 January 1913, and extended to Paruna by the end of April the same year. A branch from Alawoona to Loxton opened on 13 February 1914. The main line to Alawoona and only remaining branch to Loxton closed on 6 January 1996 to be gauge converted from broad gauge to standard gauge to retain connection to the main line from Adelaide to Melbourne after that line was converted. The last grain train left the silos on 20 June 2015, marking the closure of the line.

== Route ==
The railway branched off the main line just south of Tailem Bend, and tracked roughly north-east. The Karoonda Highway from Murray Bridge East paralleled it after about 24 kilometres at Kulde. The railway and highway continued together 100 kilometres north-east through Karoonda to Alawoona, then both turned north for the final 35 kilometres to Loxton.

The line no longer continues to Loxton station, having been curtailed at a bulk grain facility a few kilometres short of the town. The end of the main line became the grain terminal at what was originally the Tookayerta siding. The line closed on 20 July 2015, with all grain traffic now taken by road.
