= District Council of Karoonda East Murray =

- Local government area
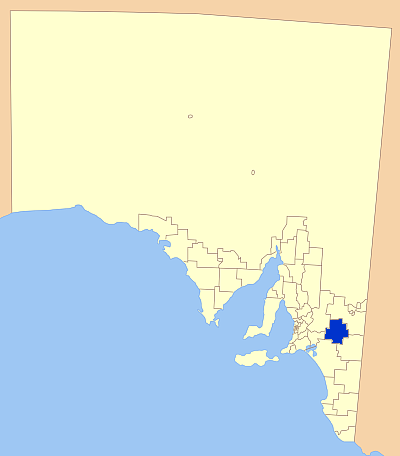
- Location of the District Council of Karoonda East Murray

- Interactive map of District Council of Karoonda East Murray
- Coordinates: 35.0188°S 140.1306°E
- Country: Australia
- State: South Australia
- Region: Murray and Mallee
- Established: 1979
- Council seat: Karoonda

Government
  - Mayor: Caroline Philips
  - State electorate: Chaffey
  - Federal division: Barker

Area
  - Total: 4,415 km^{2} (1,705 sq mi)

Population
  - Total: 1,007 (LGA 2021)
  - Density: 0.23/km^{2} (0.60/sq mi)
- Website: District Council of Karoonda East Murray
LGAs around District Council of Karoonda East Murray
Mid Murray Council	District Council of Loxton Waikerie	District Council of Loxton Waikerie
Mid Murray Council	District Council of Karoonda East Murray	Southern Mallee District Council
Rural City of Murray Bridge	Coorong District Council	Southern Mallee District Council

The District Council of Karoonda East Murray is a local government area in the Murray Mallee area of South Australia. The main council offices are in Karoonda.

The council area covers 4,415 square kilometres and had a population of approximately 1,100 at the 2016 Census. The annual average rainfall is 350 mm.

It is entirely in the state electorate of Chaffey and the federal Division of Barker.

== History ==
The council was established in 1979 when the District Council of Karoonda (established 1922) and the District Council of East Murray (established 1923) amalgamated.

The township of Karoonda was established in 1913 when the mallee railway lines were put in place to open the area to grain growing, as previous pastoral runs had failed.

== Geography ==
It includes the towns and localities of Bakara, Borrika, Copeville, Galga, Halidon, Karoonda, Marama, Mindarie, Perponda, Sandalwood, Wanbi and Wynarka, as well as parts of Bowhill, Mantung and Mercunda.

== Councillors ==
Ward	Councillor	Notes
Mayor	Caroline Phillips	
Unsubdivided	Yvonne Smith	
Unsubdivided	Kevin Burdett	
Unsubdivided	Daryl Sparks	
Unsubdivided	Russell Norman	
Unsubdivided	Simon Martin	
Unsubdivided	Darren Zadow	

The District Council of Karoonda East Murray has a directly-elected mayor.

== Mayors and chairmen of Karoonda East Murray ==
- Allan Ernest Arbon (1979-1981)
- Douglas James (Doug) Fullston (1981-1993)
- Allan Ernest Arbon (1993-2000)
- Kevin Burdett (2000-2018)
- Caroline Phillips (2018–Present)
