= Karoonda, South Australia =

Karoonda
- Town
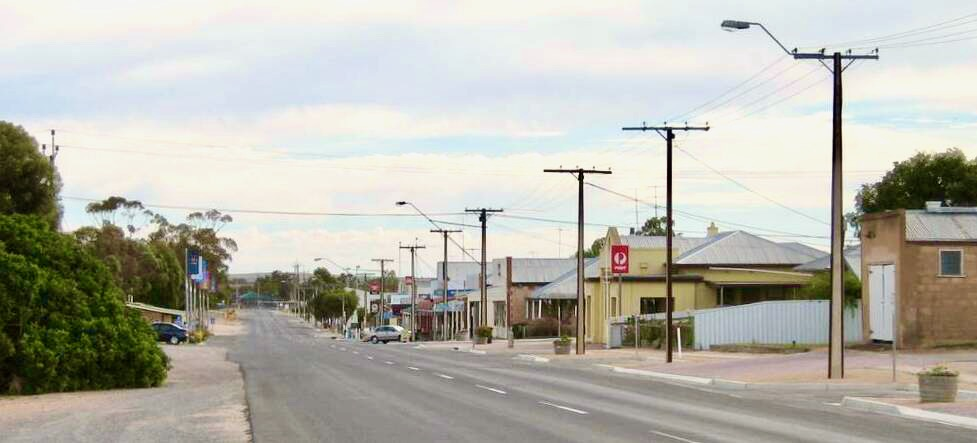
- Main Street of Karoonda

- Coordinates: 35°05′40″S 139°53′45″E
- Country: Australia
- State: South Australia
- Region: Murray and Mallee
- LGA: District Council of Karoonda East Murray
- Location: 119 km (74 mi) E of Adelaide
- Established: 11 December 1913 (town); 11 November 1999 (locality)

Government
  - State electorate: Hammond
  - Federal division: Barker

Population
  - Total: 337 (UCL 2021)
- Time zone: UTC+9:30 (ACST)
  - Summer (DST): UTC+10:30 (ACDT)
- Postcode: 5307
- County: Buccleuch
- Mean max temp: 23.6 °C (74.5 °F)
- Mean min temp: 9.3 °C (48.7 °F)
- Annual rainfall: 336.3 mm (13.24 in)
Localities around Karoonda
Bowhill	Perponda; Borrika	Borrika
Bowhill; Wynarka	Karoonda	Borrika; Marama
Sherlock	Sherlock; Peake; Jabuk	Jabuk

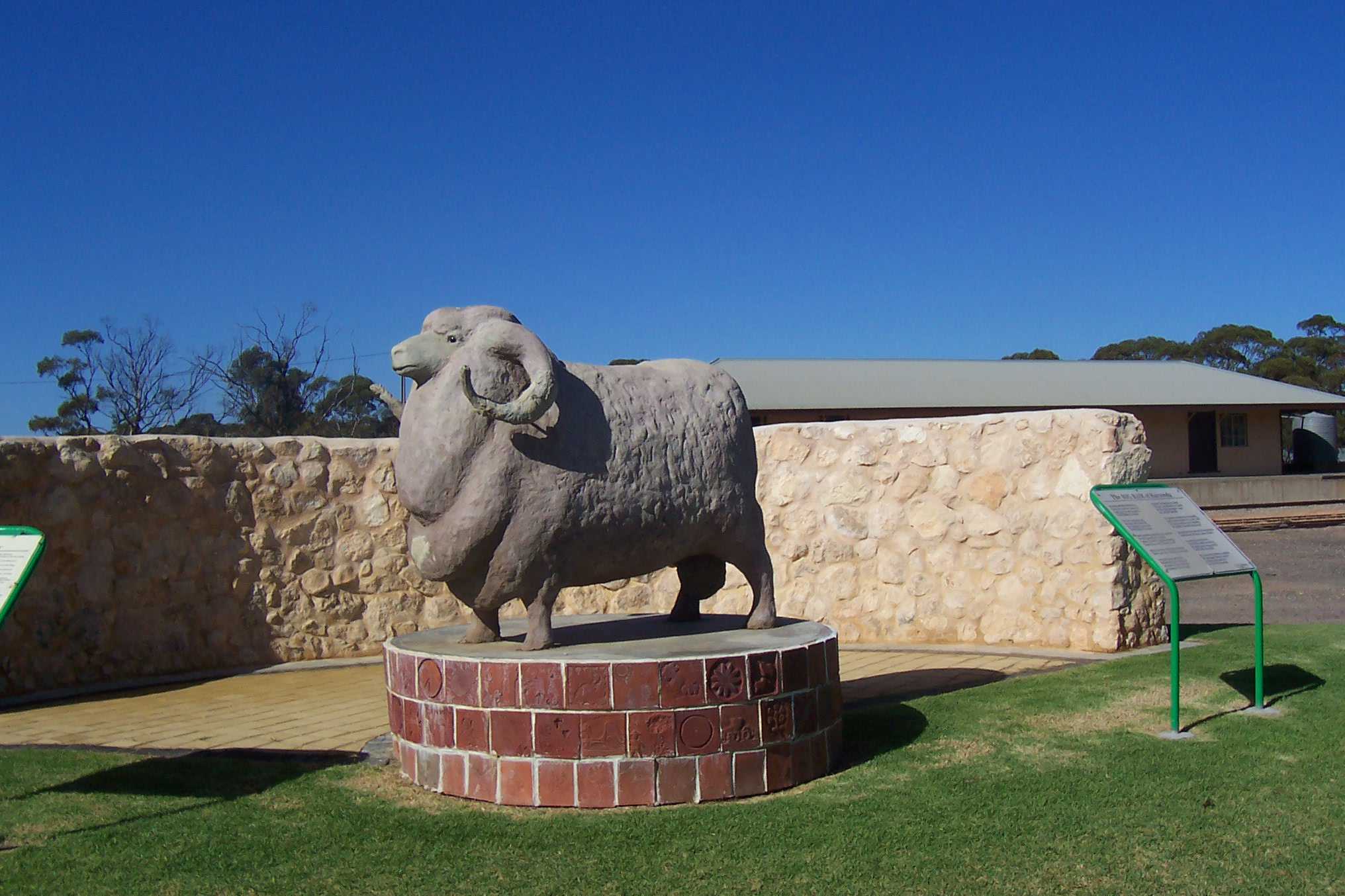
A ram statue in Karoonda recognises the significance of sheep husbandry in the region

Karoonda is a town in the middle of the Murray Mallee region of South Australia (60 km (37 mi) northeast of Murray Bridge). The current boundaries include the former town of Lowaldie, which was the next stop on the railway line away from Adelaide.

== History ==
Karoonda takes its name from the Aboriginal word for "winter camp".

The town was founded on wheat-growing early in the 20th century (proclaimed on 11 December 1913), but the cleared land is also suitable for raising merino sheep. The Karoonda Development Group instigated and built a larger-than-life sculpture of a Merino ram in the park in the main street to emphasise this. There are even seats with rams heads dotted around the town. A number of other agricultural and horticultural industries are now also represented in the district. Each year the Karoonda Farm Fair is held, a two-day event attracting over 10,000 visitors to the town.

In 1922 the District Council of Karoonda was established, bringing local-level government to the township and surrounding district for the first time.

Karoonda briefly shot to international fame in 1930 when the "Karoonda meteorite" fell to earth just to the east of the town on the night of 25 November. Being of a very rare type and being found only a couple of weeks afterwards, it raised international interest in astronomical circles.

=== Railways ===
Railways were built in 1911–1914 to open up the Murray Mallee for agriculture. Karoonda was on the railway line to Paringa, which was extended to Barmera in 1928. In 1914 the station became a junction with the Waikerie railway line to the north and the Peebinga railway line to the east (south of the main line).

The Barmera railway line closed in 1990 but the Waikerie branch line remained open until 1994. The main line through Karoonda remained open as the Loxton railway line and was converted from broad gauge to standard gauge. It closed in July 2015.

== Governance and demographics ==
Karoonda is located in the local government area of District Council of Karoonda East Murray, the state electoral district of Hammond and the federal Division of Barker.

At the 2016 census, the locality of Karoonda had a population of 512, of which 351 were living in and around the town of Karoonda. In Karoonda locality 90.6% of people were born in Australia and 93.3% of people spoke only English at home. The most common responses for religion were Uniting Church 25.0% and No Religion 22.4%.

== Facilities and attractions ==
Karoonda Area School was the first area school in South Australia. There is some amazing silo art done by Heesco over the winter months of 2019 also the playground is a good car stop for kids of all ages Pioneer Park on East Terrace is being developed as a Malleelands Pioneer Railways and farm museum, with displays of harvest machinery, ploughs, railway rolling stock and facilities already in place. The Nature Trail & Bush Walk is adjacent.

There is an obelisk to commemorate the Karoonda meteorite in the RSL Park on Railway Terrace.

== Climate ==
Karoonda has a mediterranean-influenced semi-arid climate (Köppen: BSk), with very warm, dry summers and mild, somewhat wetter winters. Mean maxima vary from 31.6 °C (88.9 °F) in January to 15.7 °C (60.3 °F) in July, while mean minima fluctuate between 14.5 °C (58.1 °F) in January and 4.8 °C (40.6 °F) in July. Annual precipitation is low, averaging 336.3 mm (13.24 in) between 93.5 precipitation days. Extreme temperatures have ranged from 47.6 °C (117.7 °F) on 20 December 2019 to −4.0 °C (24.8 °F) on 15 June 2006.

Climate data for Karoonda (35º05'24"S, 139º54'00"E, 72 m AMSL) (2002-2024 normals and extremes, rainfall to 1914)
Month	Jan	Feb	Mar	Apr	May	Jun	Jul	Aug	Sep	Oct	Nov	Dec	Year
Record high °C (°F)	47.0 (116.6)	46.3 (115.3)	42.0 (107.6)	38.0 (100.4)	29.5 (85.1)	24.9 (76.8)	26.8 (80.2)	32.0 (89.6)	34.1 (93.4)	39.2 (102.6)	44.2 (111.6)	47.6 (117.7)	47.6 (117.7)
Mean daily maximum °C (°F)	31.6 (88.9)	30.5 (86.9)	28.0 (82.4)	23.5 (74.3)	19.1 (66.4)	16.1 (61.0)	15.7 (60.3)	17.2 (63.0)	20.4 (68.7)	24.0 (75.2)	27.6 (81.7)	29.7 (85.5)	23.6 (74.5)
Mean daily minimum °C (°F)	14.5 (58.1)	14.1 (57.4)	12.2 (54.0)	9.6 (49.3)	7.1 (44.8)	5.5 (41.9)	4.8 (40.6)	4.9 (40.8)	6.5 (43.7)	8.4 (47.1)	11.2 (52.2)	13.0 (55.4)	9.3 (48.8)
Record low °C (°F)	6.4 (43.5)	6.8 (44.2)	4.0 (39.2)	0.6 (33.1)	−3.0 (26.6)	−4.0 (24.8)	−3.1 (26.4)	−2.3 (27.9)	−1.9 (28.6)	0.6 (33.1)	2.5 (36.5)	4.3 (39.7)	−4.0 (24.8)
Average precipitation mm (inches)	17.8 (0.70)	19.7 (0.78)	16.9 (0.67)	24.3 (0.96)	35.0 (1.38)	34.8 (1.37)	34.5 (1.36)	37.7 (1.48)	35.1 (1.38)	31.8 (1.25)	24.5 (0.96)	24.4 (0.96)	336.3 (13.24)
Average precipitation days (≥ 0.2 mm)	3.7	3.5	3.9	6.8	9.9	10.8	12.4	12.5	10.3	8.3	6.2	5.2	93.5
Source: Bureau of Meteorology (2002-2024 normals and extremes, rainfall to 1914)

== Lowaldie ==
The Lowaldie railway station was 6.25 miles (10.06 km) east of Karoonda and also had a small town surveyed, with a school and post office operating for some time. These have all closed, and the former institute building is used as a private residence. The station was originally named Lowalde in 1913, but when the town was proclaimed in 1914, the spelling used was Lowaldie. The name is derived from a Ngarrindjeri word meaning "summer".

== Photo gallery ==
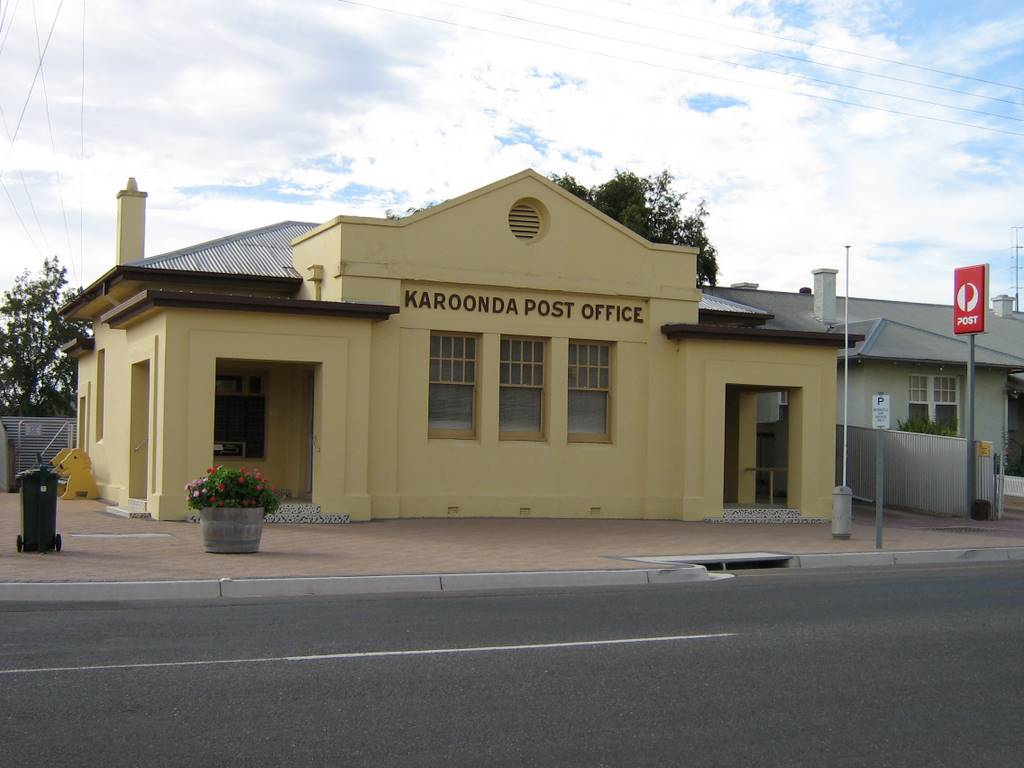
Post Office

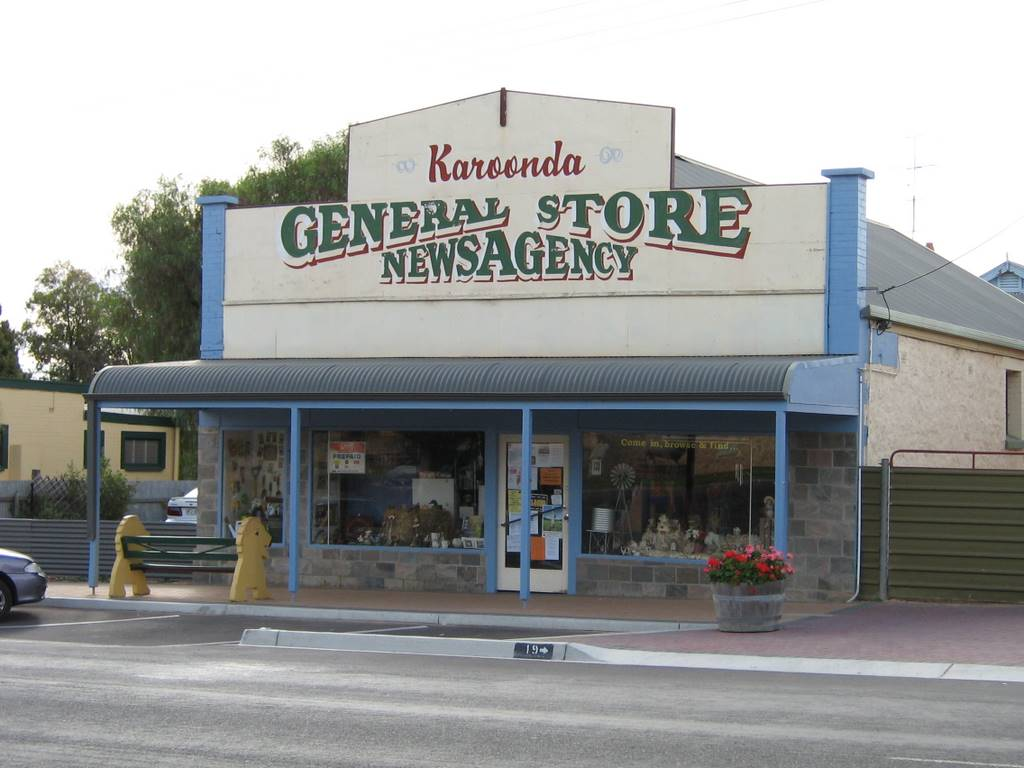
General Store

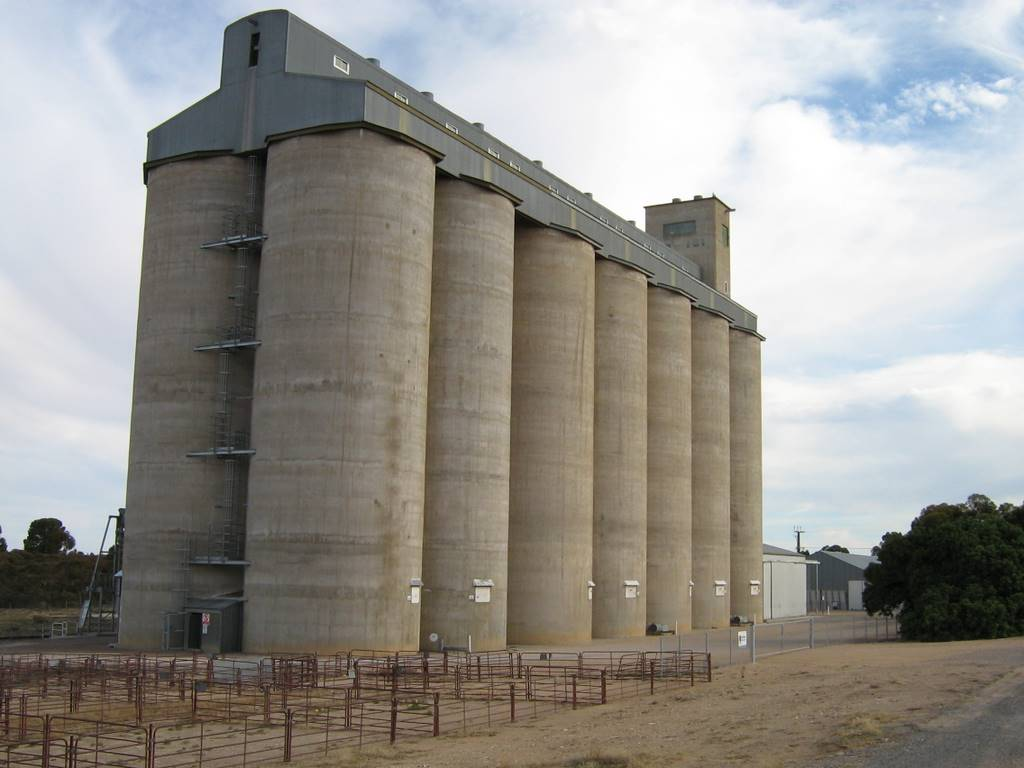
ABB Silos

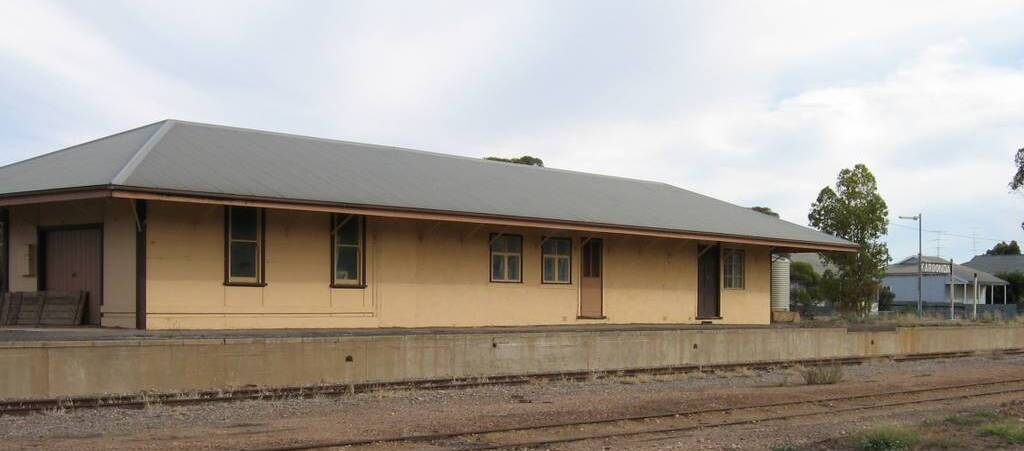
Old Railway Station

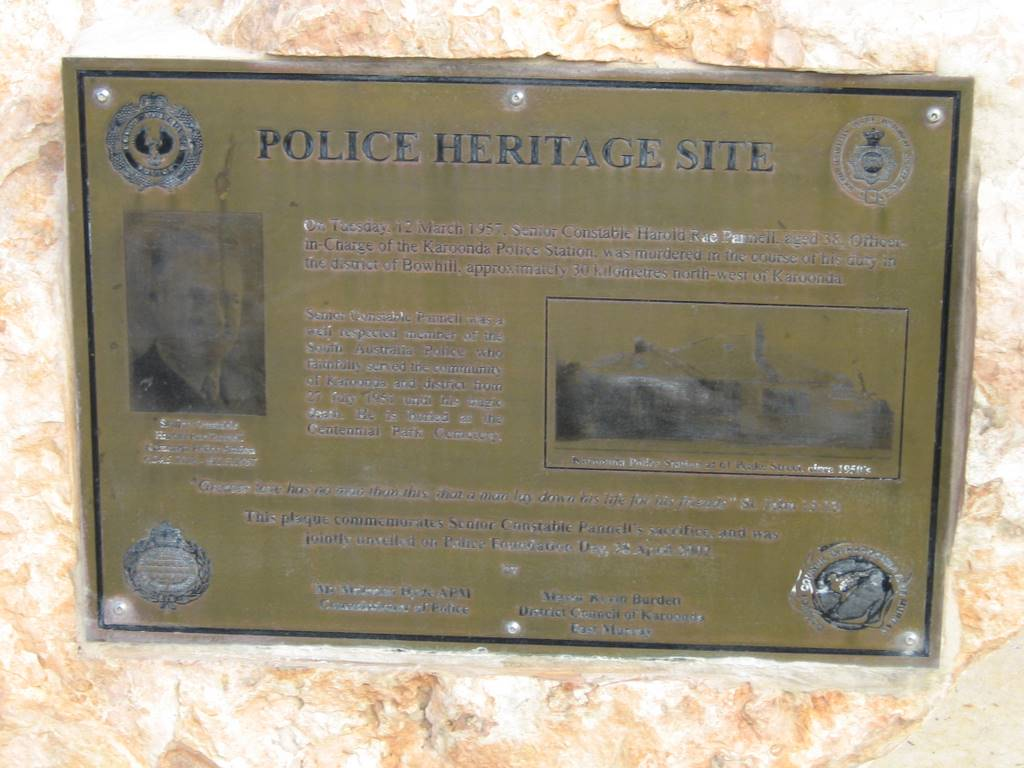
Police Memorial, Railway Tce

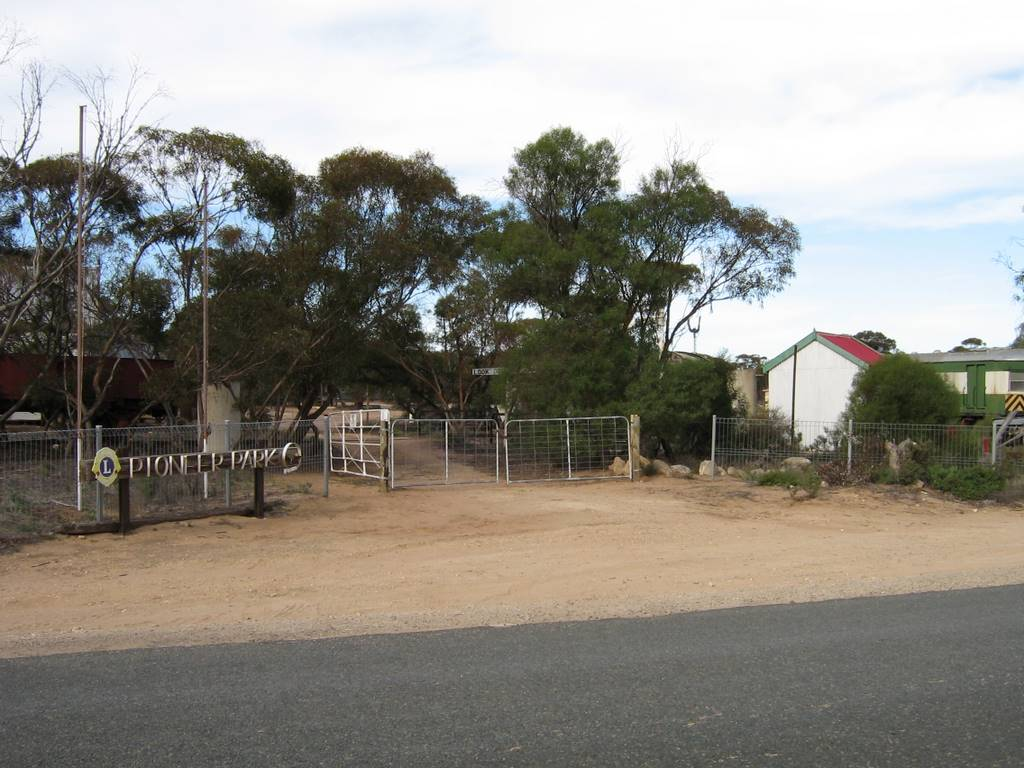
Lions Pioneer Park

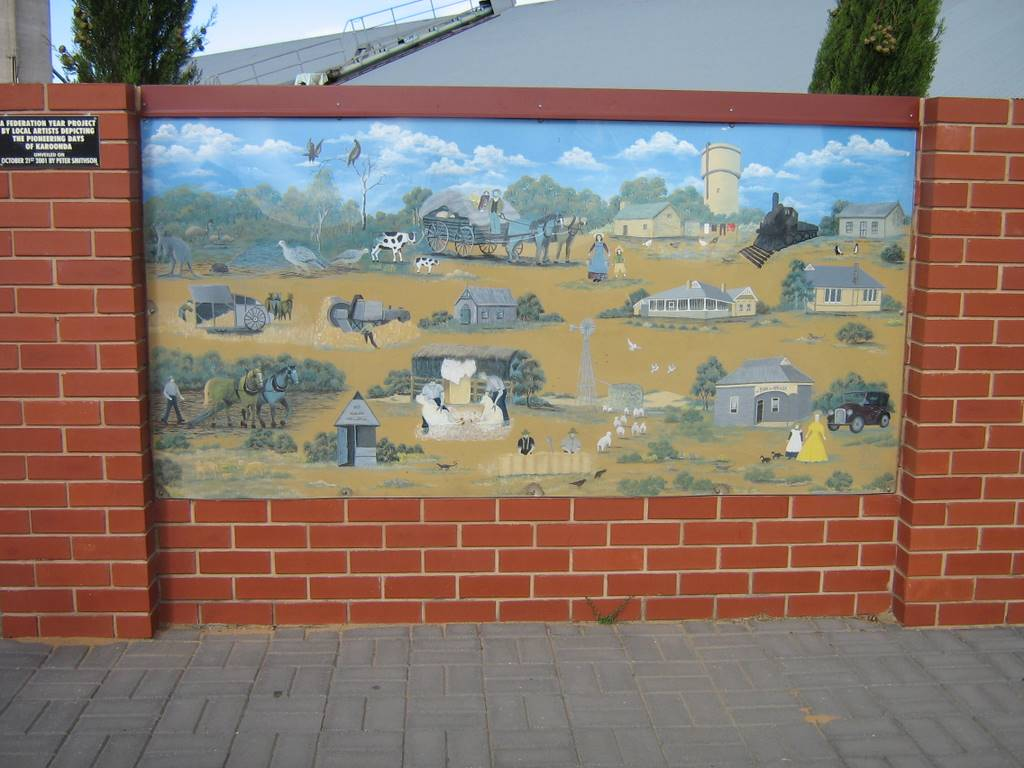
Painting at Parking Bay

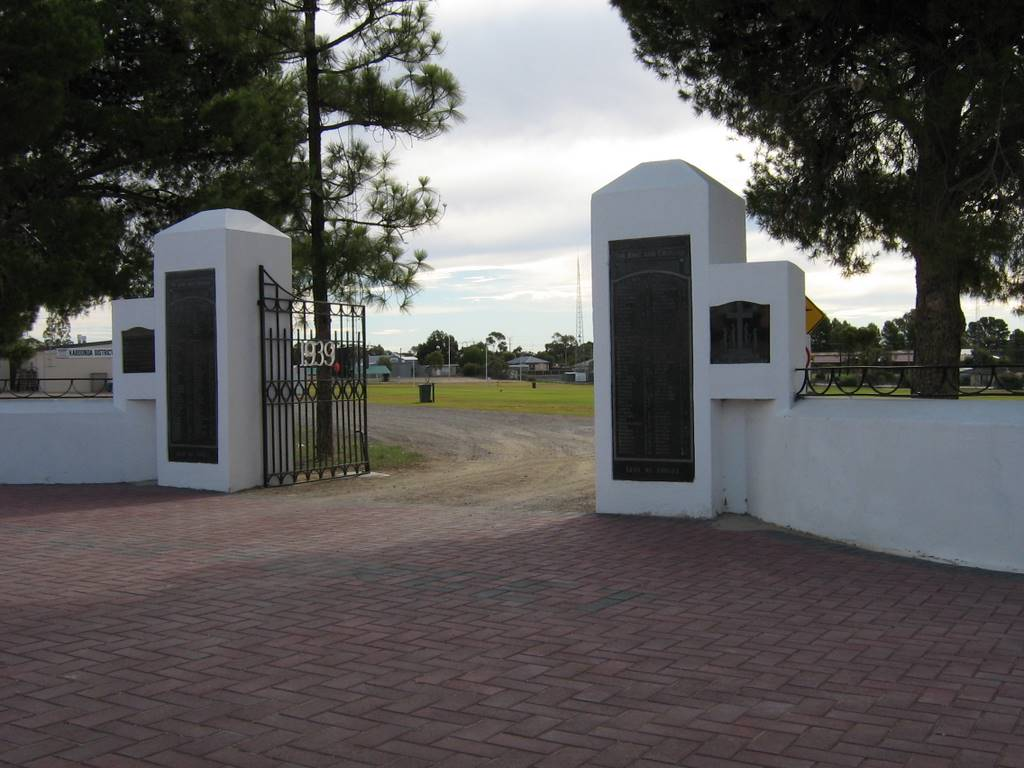
Memorial Gates at the Oval

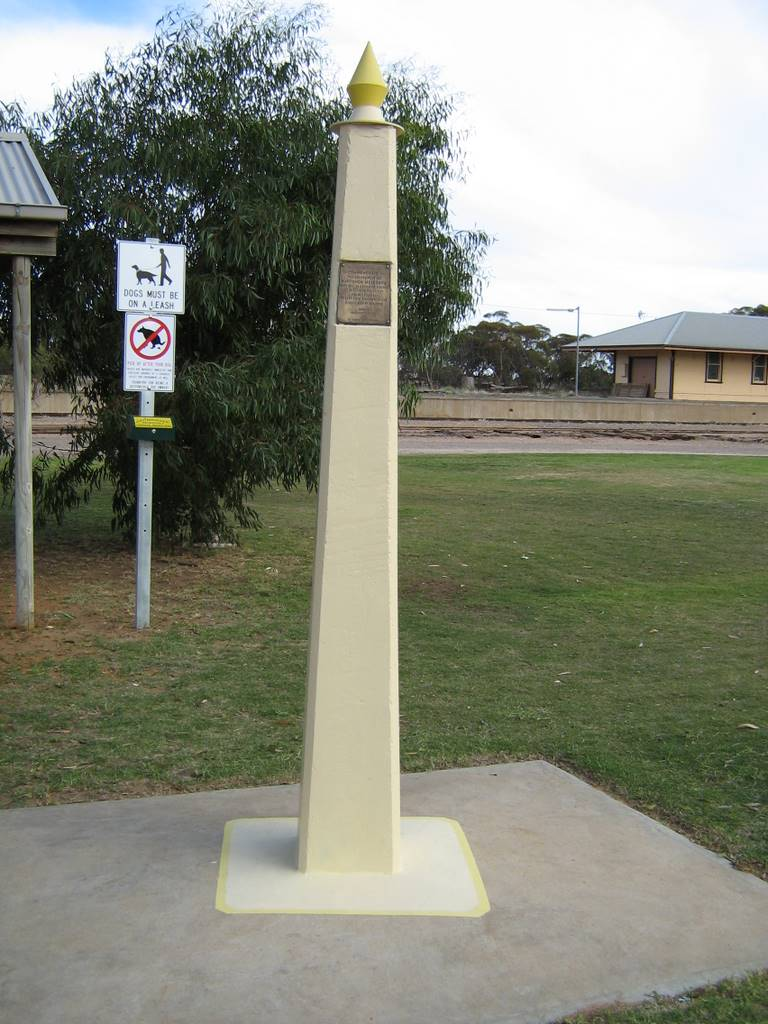
Obelisk

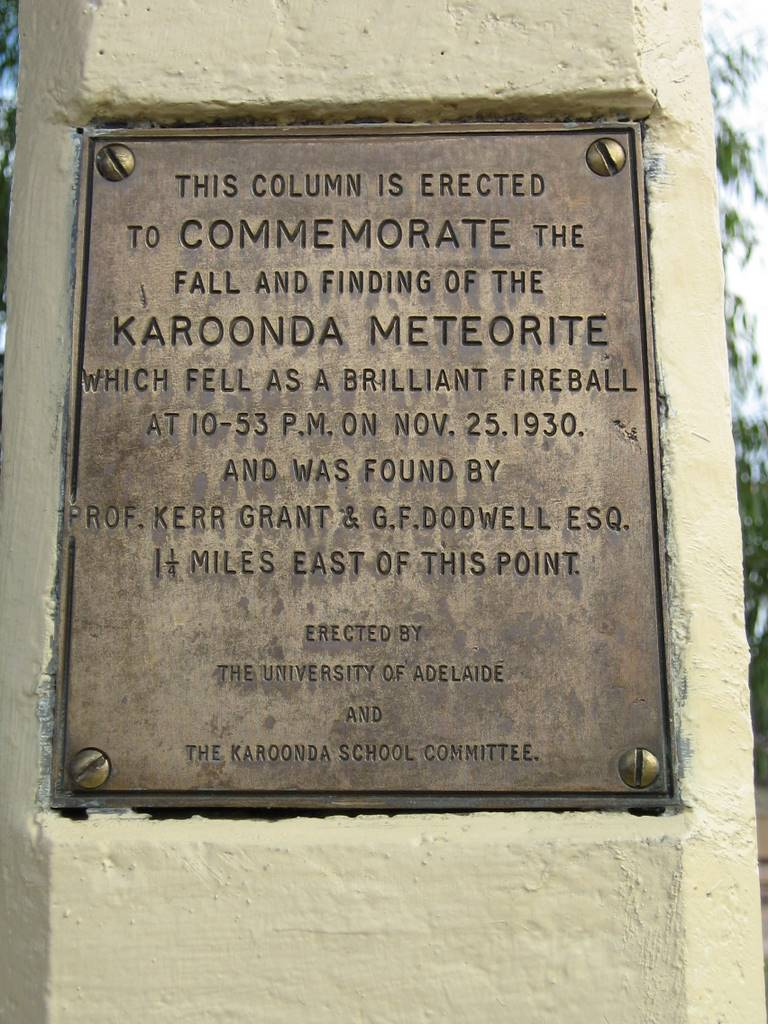
Obelisk

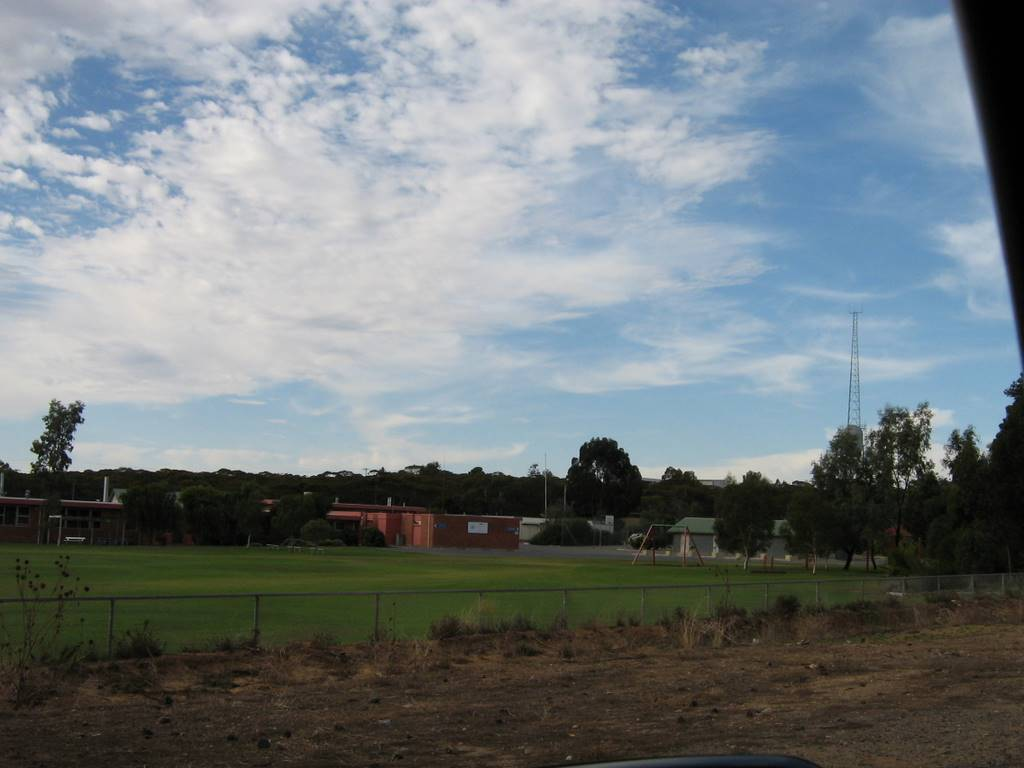
Area School

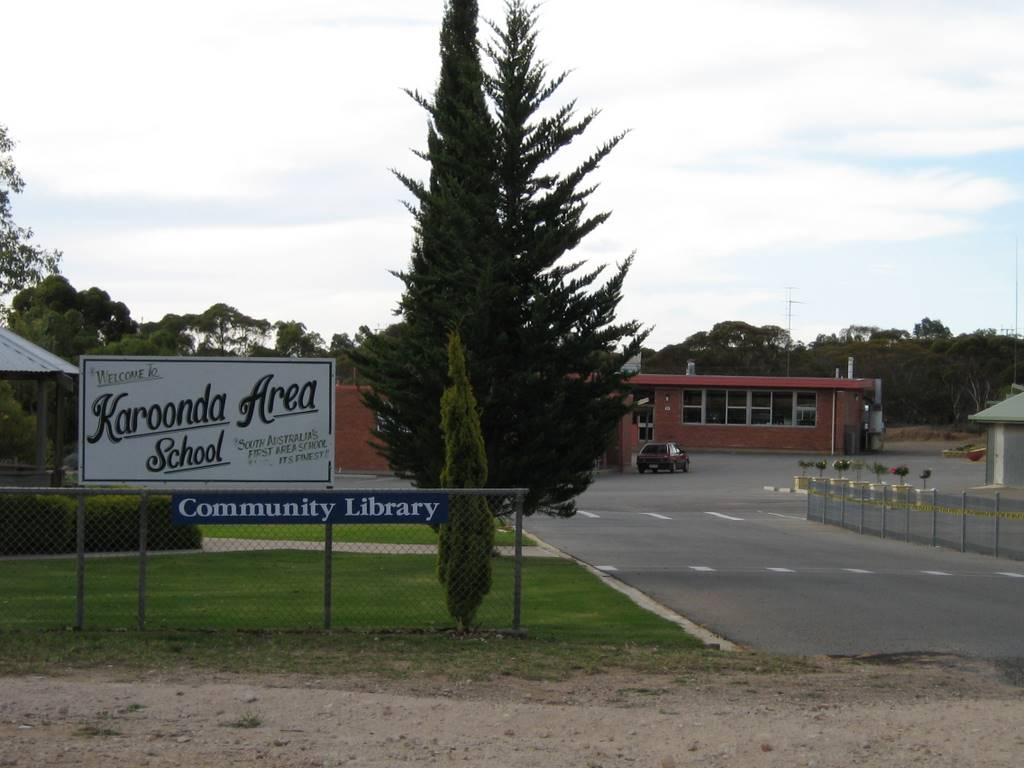
Area School

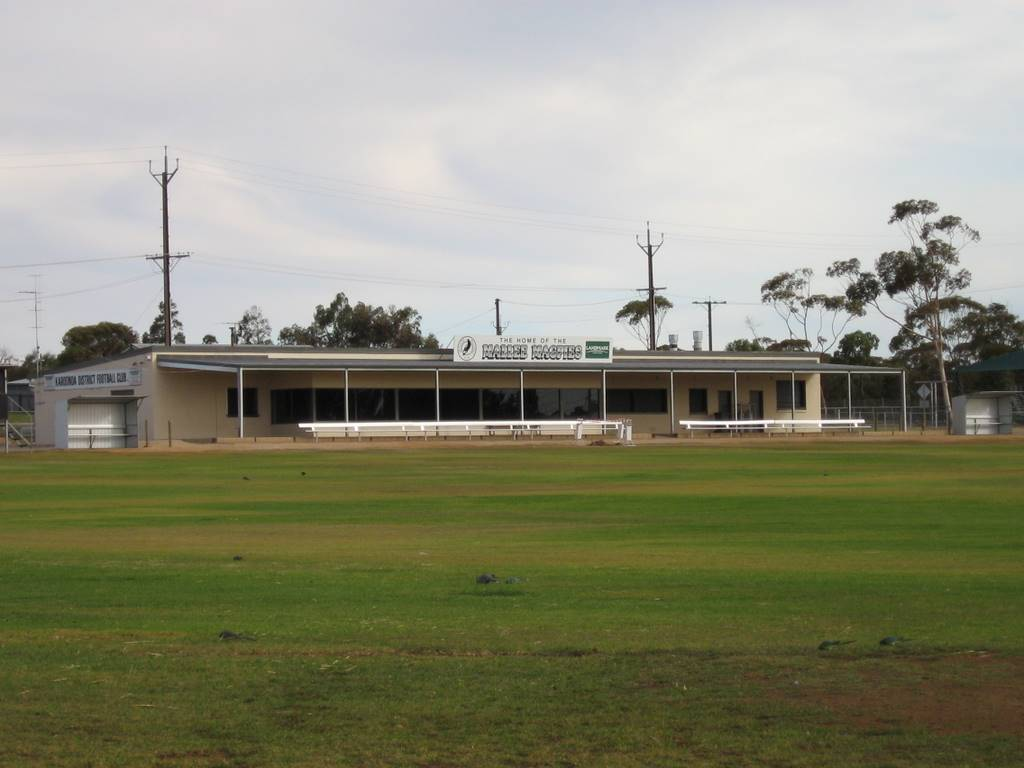
Oval

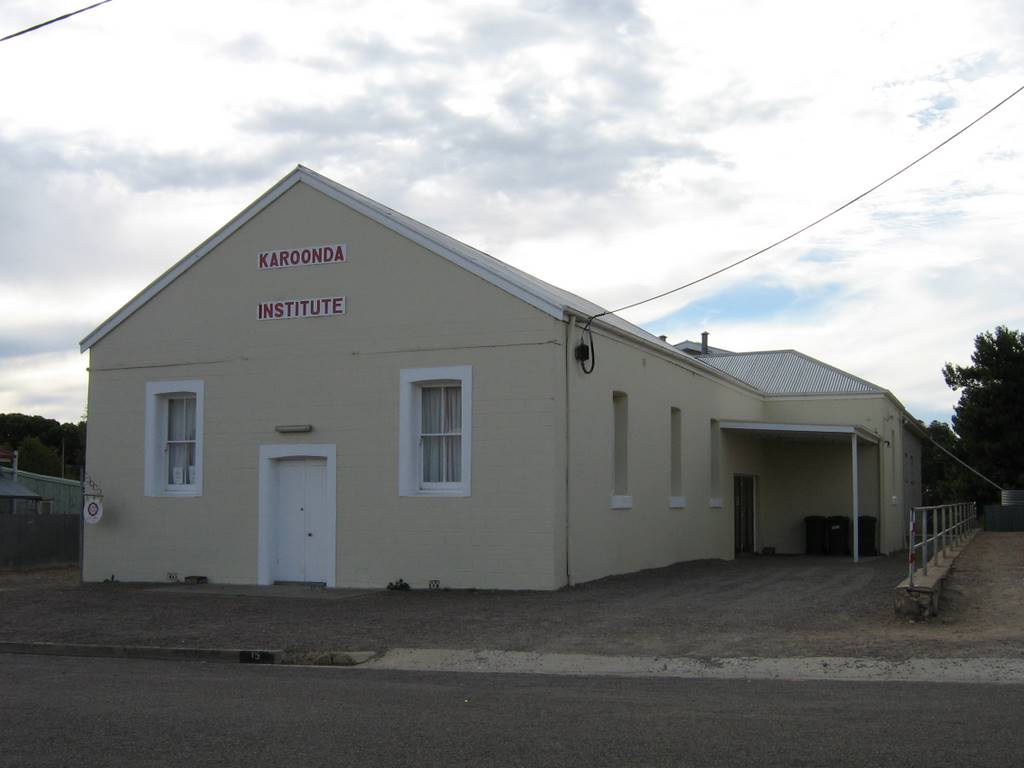
Institute

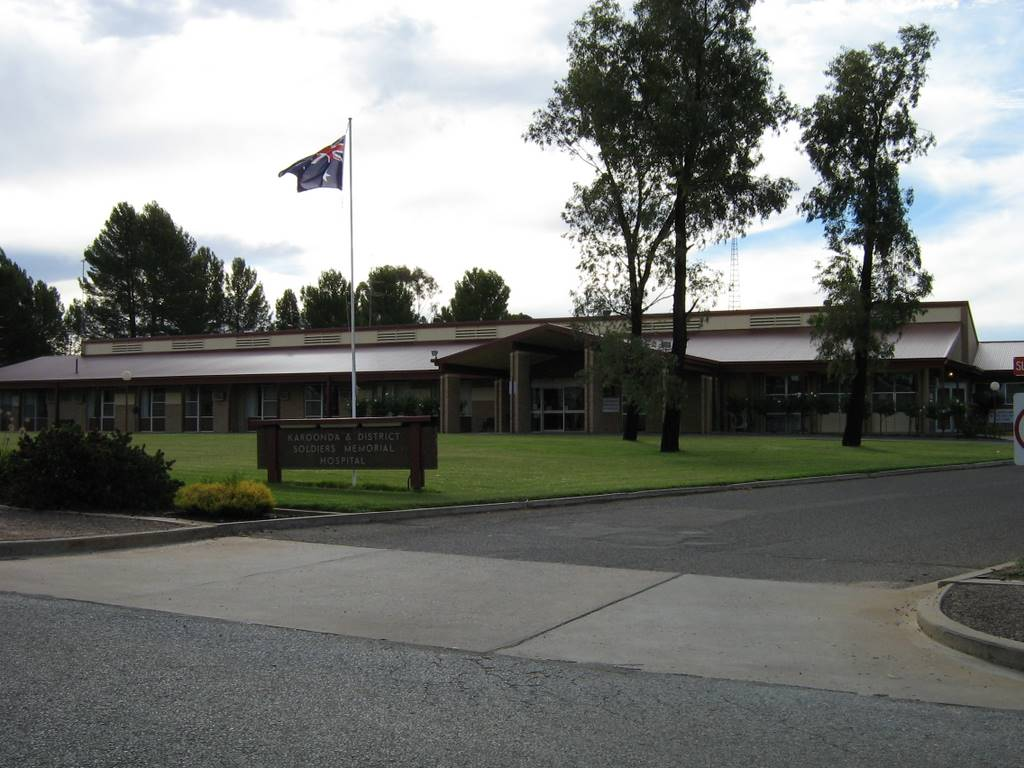
Hospital

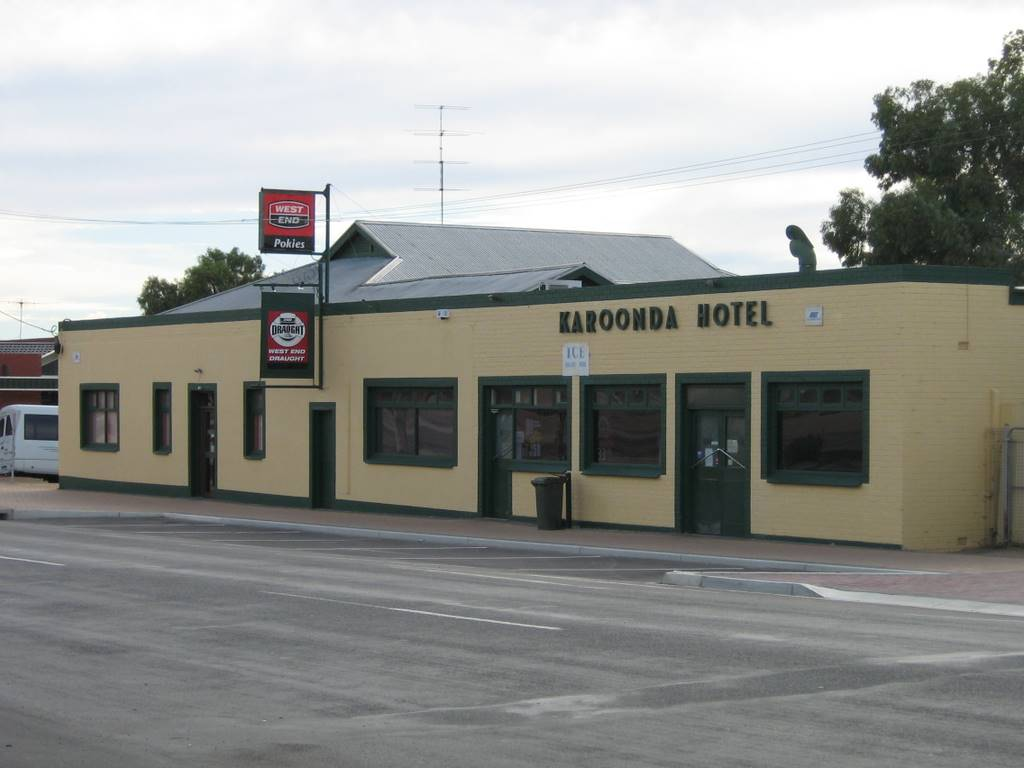
Karoonda Pub

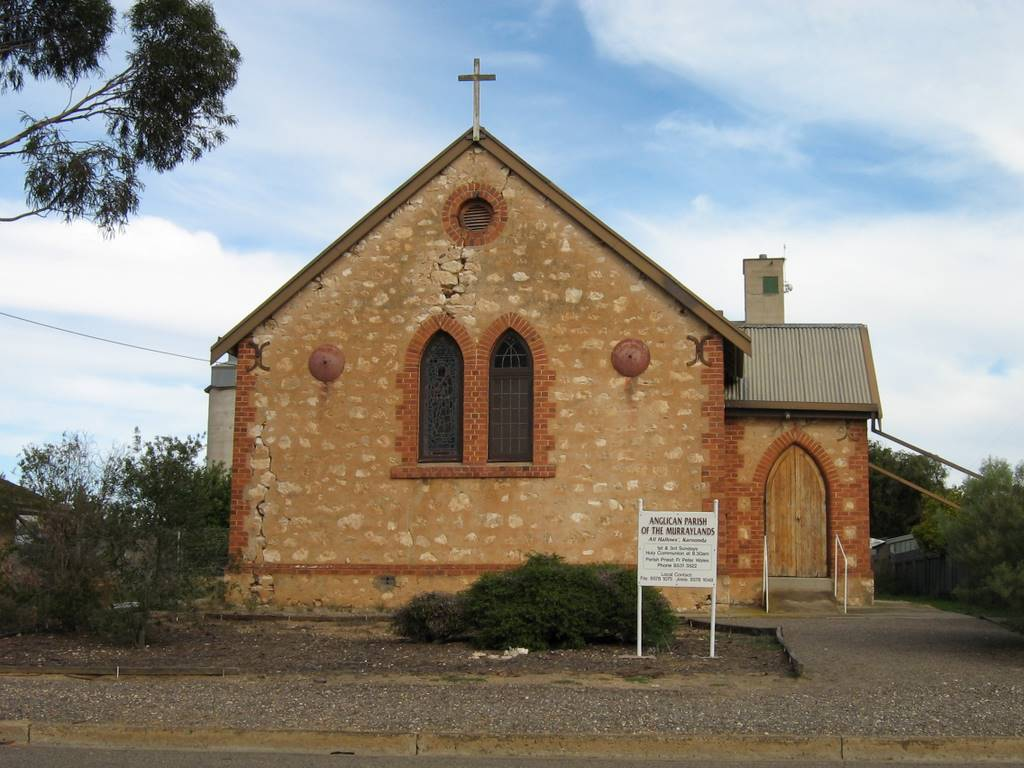
"All Hallows" Anglican Church

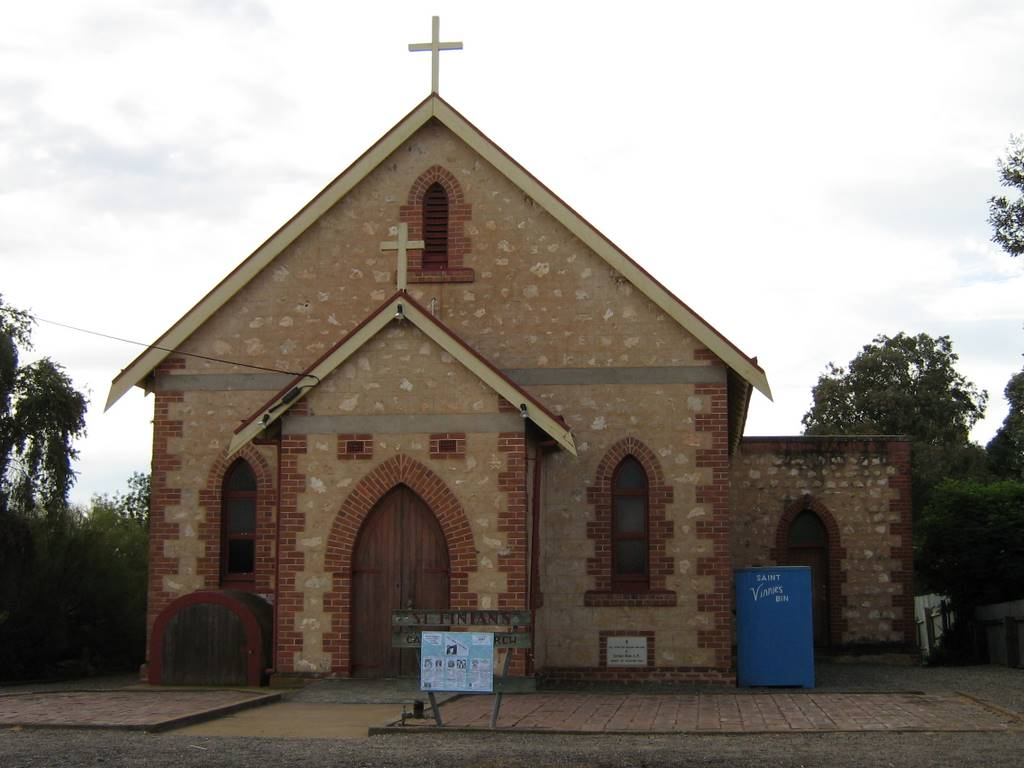
St Finian's Catholic Church

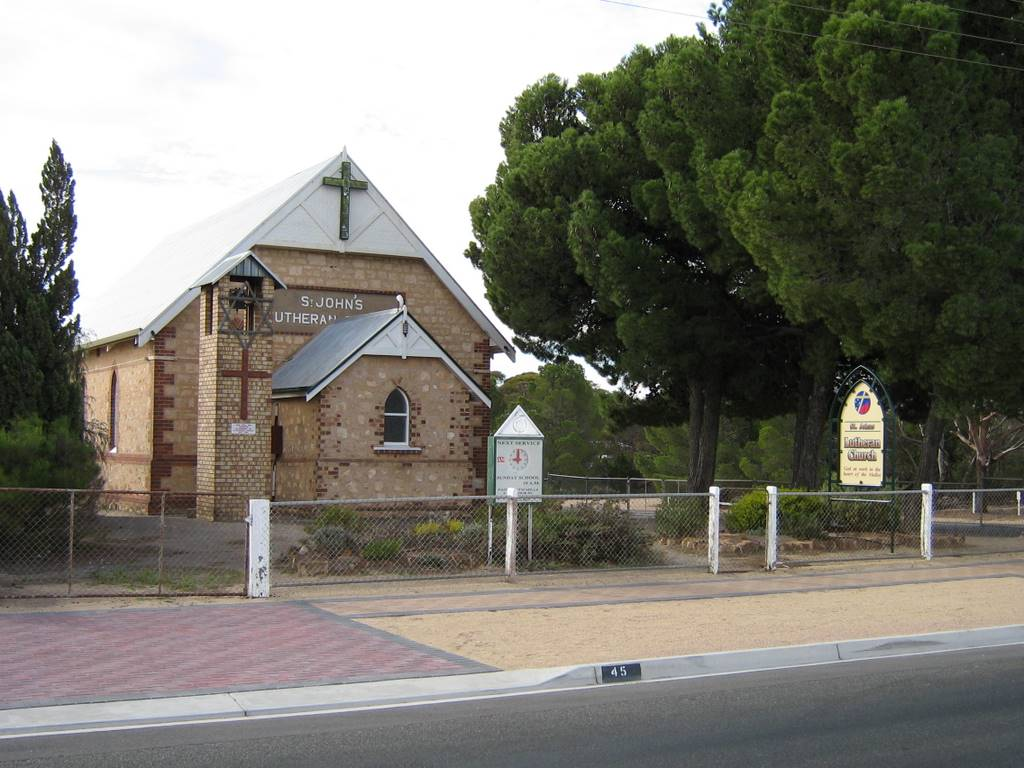
St Johns Lutheran Church

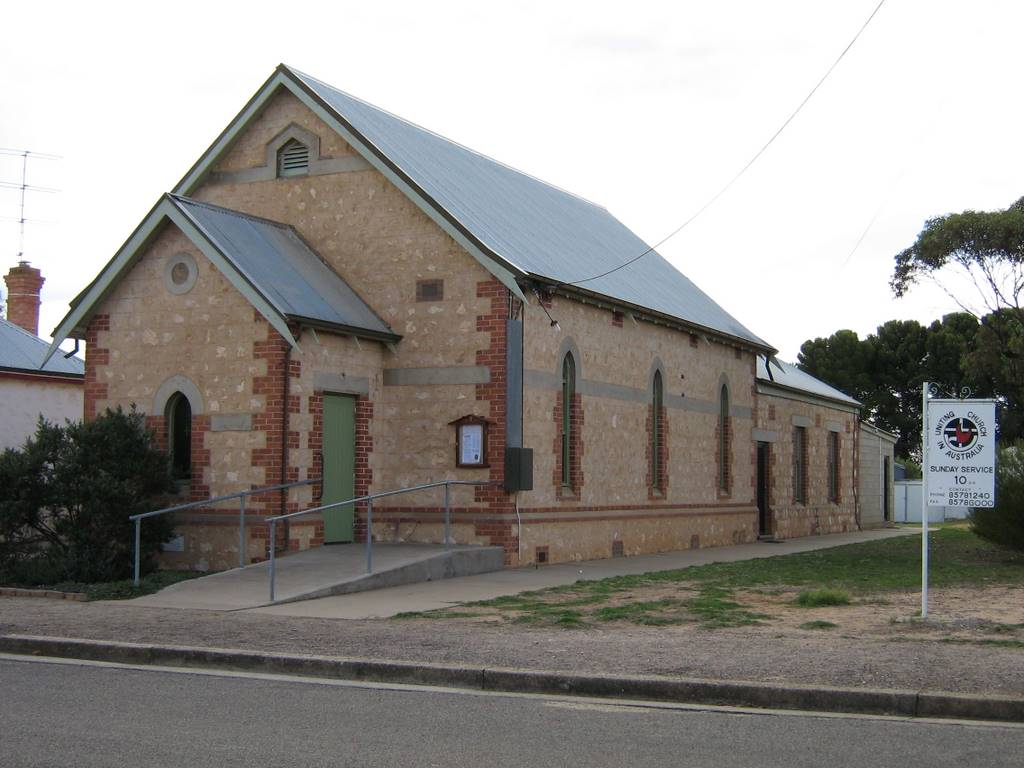
Uniting Church

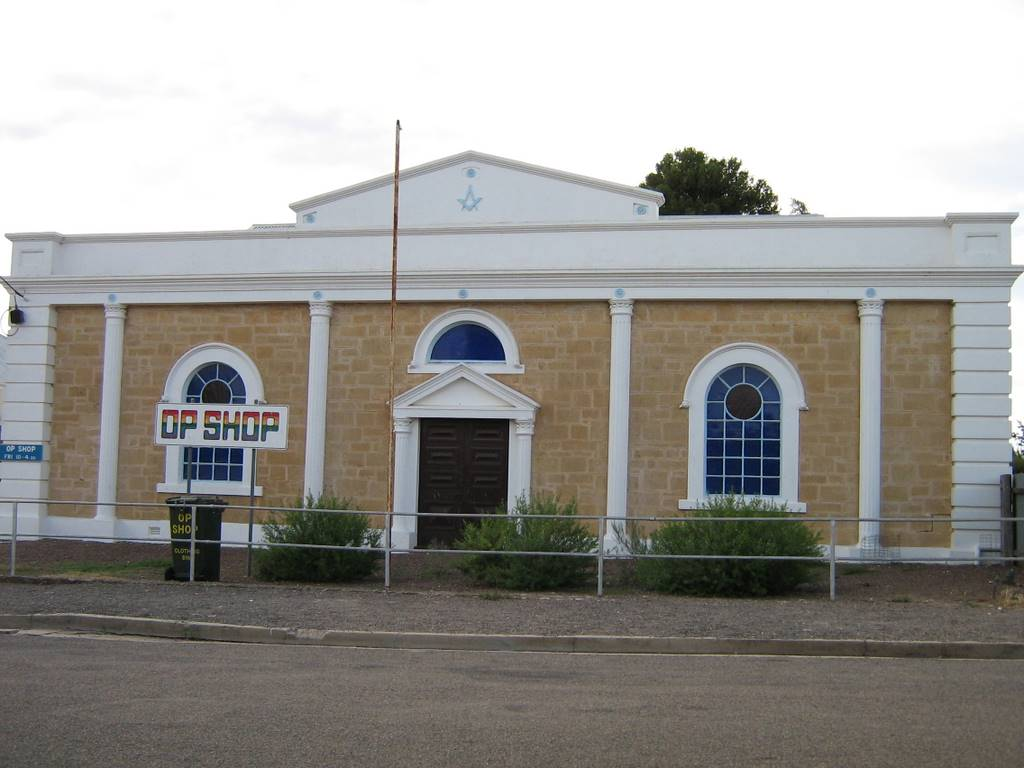
Op-Shop

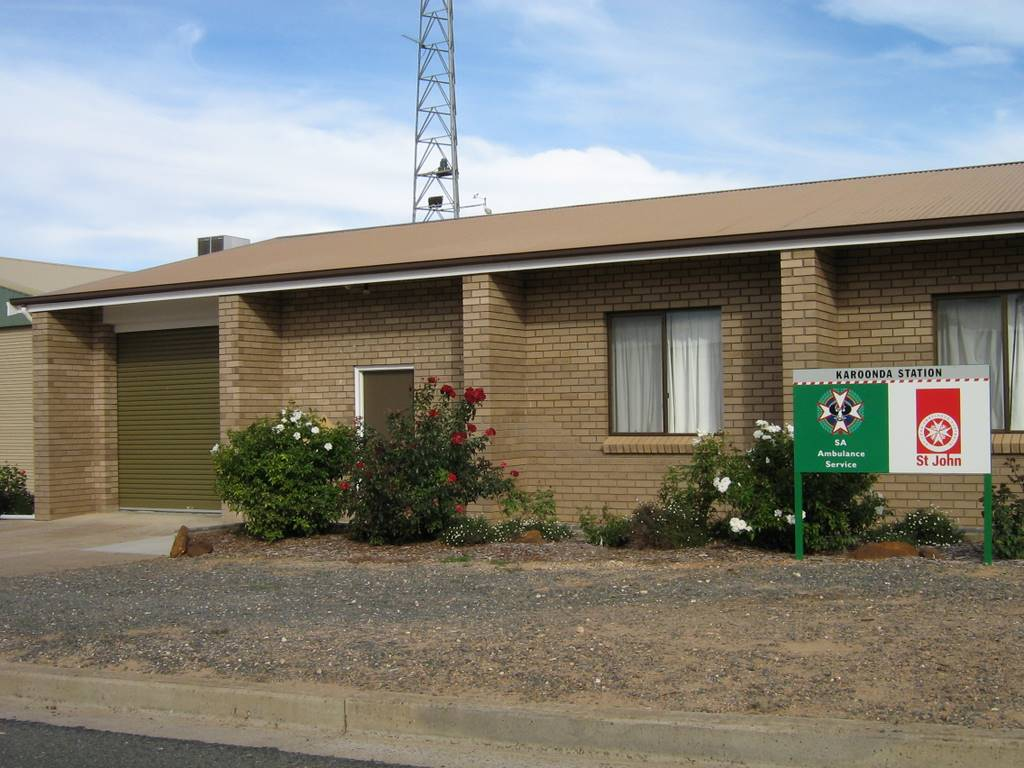
Ambulance Station

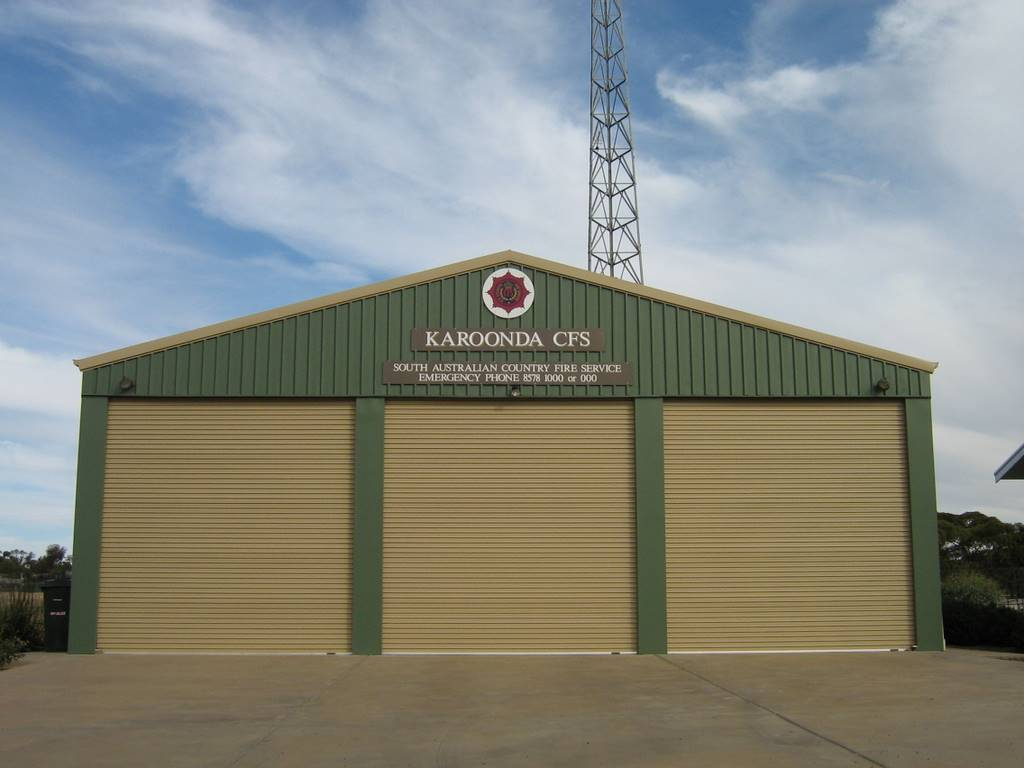
CFS Station

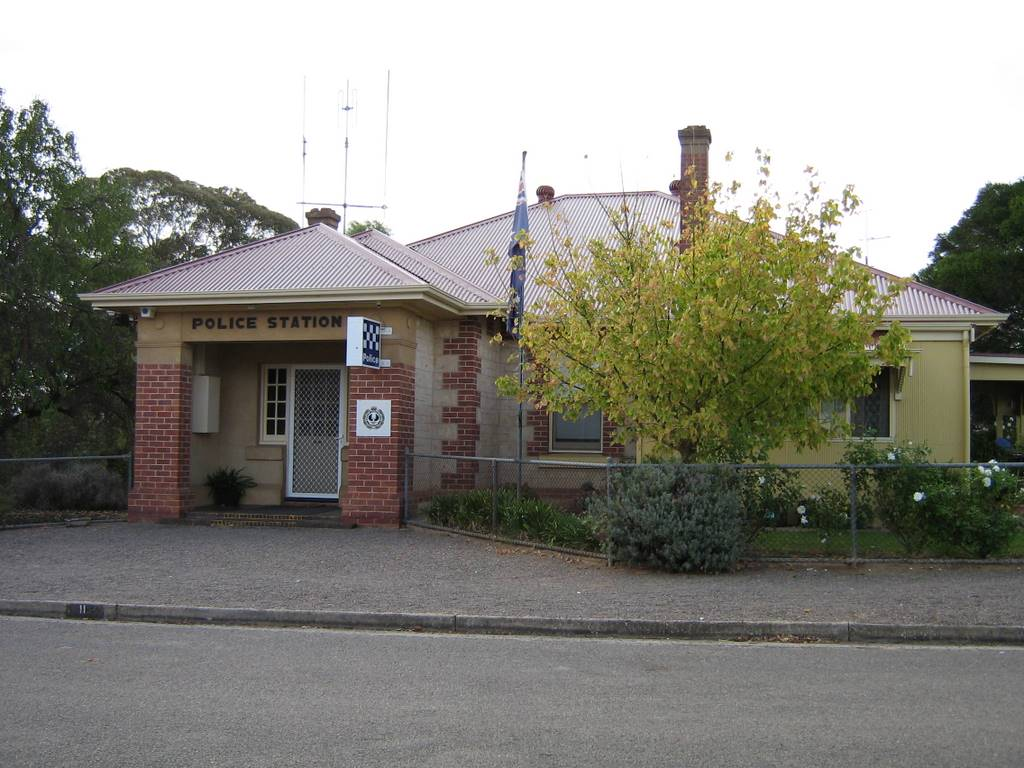
Police Station
