= Electoral district of Hammond =

South Australian state electoral district

Hammond South Australia—House of Assembly
- Interactive map of electoral district boundaries from the 2022 state election (Note: The electorate will have no change in boundaries at the 2026 state election.)
- State: South Australia
- Created: 1997
- MP: Robert Roylance
- Party: One Nation
- Namesake: Ruby Hammond
- Electors: 29,166 (2026)
- Area: 3,334 km^{2} (1,287.3 sq mi)
- Demographic: Rural
- Coordinates: 35.117°S 139.267°E
- Electorates around Hammond
Schubert	Chaffey	Chaffey
Kavel; Heysen	Hammond	Chaffey
Finniss	MacKillop	MacKillop

Hammond is a single-member electoral district for the South Australian House of Assembly. It is named after Ruby Hammond, the first Indigenous South Australian to stand for the federal parliament.

Hammond is a rural electorate east and south-east of Adelaide, covering 3,334 km^{2} (1,287 sq mi) in the east and upper south-east of the state, and takes in the towns of Callington, Cambrai, Coomandook, Karoonda, Langhorne Creek, Mannum, Murray Bridge, Nildottie, Peake, Pinnaroo, Purnong, Strathalbyn and Tailem Bend.

== History ==
Hammond was created in the 1994 redistribution as a replacement for the electoral district of Ridley, and was first contested at the 1997 election. As it covers a largely conservative rural area, it was easily won by maverick Liberal member Peter Lewis, the former member for Ridley. Lewis briefly and unsuccessfully tried to have the electorate renamed in 1998 on the basis that Ruby Hammond had few ties to the electorate, proposing the revival of the name Murray-Mallee (which had covered most of Hammond's territory from 1985 to 1993), or if a ceremonial name was required, Unaipon, in honour of Indigenous writer, preacher and inventor David Unaipon. Lewis was expelled from the Liberal Party in 2000, and successfully recontested the electorate as an independent at the 2002 election, depriving the Liberals of what would have been a safe seat. Lewis backed Labor to form government and was named as Speaker of the South Australian House of Assembly in return for his support.

Lewis attempted unsuccessfully to shift to the Legislative Council when it became clear that he had little-to-no chance of retaining the electorate at the 2006 election. Liberal Adrian Pederick reclaimed the seat for the Liberals at that election, picking up a swing large enough to revert Hammond to its traditional status as a comfortably safe Liberal seat. Pederick held the seat without serious difficulty from then until his defeat by One Nation in 2026.

== Members for Hammond ==
Member	Party	Term
Peter Lewis	Liberal	1997–2000
Peter Lewis	Independent	2000–2006
Adrian Pederick	Liberal	2006–2026
Robert Roylance	One Nation	2026–present

== Election results ==
2026 South Australian state election: Hammond
Party	Candidate	Votes	%	±%
One Nation	Robert Roylance	6,440	27.4	+20.5
Labor	Simone Bailey	6,355	27.0	+3.8
Liberal	Adrian Pederick	5,244	22.3	−18.2
Independent	Airlie Keen	2,294	9.7	−6.0
Greens	Nicole Palachicky	1,166	5.0	−1.2
Legalise Cannabis	James Murphy	780	3.3	+3.3
Family First	Robert North	422	1.8	−2.5
Animal Justice	Ruby Eckermann	356	1.5	+1.5
Independent	Lucas Hope	229	1.0	+1.0
Australian Family	Bruce Hicks	114	0.5	+0.5
United Voice	Carmelo Graziano	88	0.4	+0.4
Fair Go	Tristan Iveson	34	0.1	+0.1
Total formal votes		23,523	92.3	−3.5
Informal votes		1,961	7.7	+3.5
Turnout		25,484	87.4	−0.4
Two-party-preferred result
One Nation	Robert Roylance	12,913	54.9	+54.9
Labor	Simone Bailey	10,609	45.1	+0.2
One Nation gain from Liberal				
