= Mount Rescue Conservation Park =

Protected area in South Australia

- IUCN category Ia (strict nature reserve)
- Location within South Australia
- Location: South Australia
- Nearest city: Tintinara
- Coordinates: 35°53′08″S 140°21′14″E
- Area: 283.4 km^{2} (109.4 sq mi)
- Established: 20 August 1953
- Governing body: Department for Environment and Heritage (2004)

Mount Rescue Conservation Park (formerly Mount Rescue National Park) was a protected area in the Australian state of South Australia located in the state’s south-east in the locality of Ngarkat about 190 kilometres (120 mi) south-east of the state capital of Adelaide and about 18 kilometres (11 mi) east of the town of Tintinara.

The conservation park consisted of land in sections 7 to 10 in the cadastral unit of the Hundred of Archibald and sections 3 and 4 in the cadastral unit of the Hundred of Makin located in the south-west corner of the locality of Ngarkat. The land was given protected area status in 1953 because it was “predominantly... unsuitable for development on account of its hilly or sandy nature”. Its name was derived from Mount Rescue, a hill with a height of 129 metres (423 ft) and which is located to the immediate east of the conservation park in section 23 of the Hundred of Makin.

The history of its protected area status and the associated land tenure from 1953 to 1972 follows:

- On 20 August 1953, sections 9 and 10 in the Hundred of Archibald and sections 3 and 4 in the Hundred of Makin were dedicated under the Crown Lands Act 1929 “for flora and fauna purposes”.
- On 8 March 1962, the land in the Hundreds of Archibald and Makin which was dedicated in 1953 was resumed and dedicated as a wild life reserve under the Crown Lands Act 1929.
- On 19 July 1962, land previously as a wild life reserve under the Crown Lands Act 1929 earlier in 1962 was declared as a wild life reserve under the National Park and Wild Life Reserves Act 1891.
- On 19 June 1965, land in sections 7 and 8 of the Hundred of Archibald was dedicated as a wild-life reserve under the Crown Lands Act 1929.
- On 29 July 1965, land in the Hundred of Archibald which was dedicated as a wild-life reserve under the Crown Lands Act 1929 in June 1965 was declared a wildlife reserve under the National Park and Wild Life Reserves Act 1891.
- On 9 November 1967, land in sections 7, 8, 9 and 10 of the Hundred of Archibald and sections 3 and 4 of the Hundred of Makin was declared under the National Parks Act 1966 as the Mount Rescue National Park.
- On 27 April 1972, land in the Mount Rescue National Park was constituted under the National Parks and Wildlife Act 1972 as the Mount Rescue Conservation Park.

On 27 May 2004, the conservation park and the nearby Mount Shaugh and Scorpion Springs Conservation Parks were abolished and their land holdings were added to that of the adjoining Ngarkat Conservation Park. As of February 2004, the conservation park covered an area of 283.4 square kilometres (109.4 sq mi).

In 1980, the conservation park was described as follows:

Mount Rescue Conservation Park preserves a large area of vegetated sand plains and dunes in a region which has an average annual rainfall of 425-450mm. There is a close correlation between topography, soil type and plant communities. Nearly three quarters of the park are covered by an open heath of Xanthorrhoea australis, Banksia ornata and Casuarina pusilla, while mallee open scrub and mallee tall shrubland interrupt the heath areas. Low trees of Eucalyptus fasciculosa and E. baxteri above a heath understorey occupy small areas throughout the park…

Significant Indigenous values are known to exist in this area. The Commission is currently consulting with relevant Indigenous communities about the amount of information to be placed on public record…

In this vast expanse of native vegetation are at least five species of plants which are rare in South Australia… and over seventy bird species, two of which, Leipoa ocellata (mallee fowl) and Pachycephala rufogularis (red lored whistler), are uncommon in SA… Dark Island Heath in the south of park has been the site for important ecological studies of heath communities.

The conservation park was classified in 2002 as being an IUCN Category Ia protected area. In 1980, it was listed on the now-defunct Register of the National Estate.

== See also ==
- Protected areas of South Australia
