= Ngarkat (disambiguation) =

Ngarkat were an indigenous Australian people of South Australia.

Ngarkat may also refer to the following.

- Ngarkat, South Australia, a locality
- Ngarkat Conservation Park, a protected area in South Australia
- Ngarkat Highway, a road in South Australia
- Ngarkat language, a dialect of the indigenous Australian language of Yuyu

== See also ==
- Wyperfeld, Big Desert and Ngarkat Important Bird Area
