= Scorpion Springs Conservation Park =

Protected area in South Australia

- IUCN category Ia (strict nature reserve)
- Location within South Australia
- Location: South Australia
- Nearest city: Pinnaroo
- Coordinates: 35°32′34″S 140°53′14″E
- Area: 303.43 km^{2} (117.15 sq mi)
- Established: 9 July 1970
- Governing body: Department for Environment and Heritage (2004)

Scorpion Springs Conservation Park (formerly Scorpion Well National Park) was a protected area in the Australian state of South Australia located in the state’s south-east in the locality of Pinnaroo at the border with the state of Victoria about 215 kilometres (134 mi) south-east of the state capital of Adelaide and about 16 kilometres (9.9 mi) south of the town of Pinnaroo.

The conservation park consisted of land in the following cadastral units located at the southern end of the locality of Pinnaroo - section 16 in the Hundred of Fisk, sections 9 and 10 in the Hundred of Quirke and section 65 in “South Out of Hundreds”. The land first received protected area status as the Scorpion Well National Park proclaimed on 9 July 1970 under the National Parks Act 1966. On 27 April 1972, the national park was reconstituted as the Scorpion Springs Conservation Park under the National Parks and Wildlife Act 1972. The establishment of both it and the Mount Shaugh Conservation Park were planned “concurrently with the development of adjacent areas for farming in the late 1960s” in order “to conserve the mallee heath habitat of the 90 Mile Desert”.

Its name was derived from “Scorpion Soakage” (also known as “Scorpion Spring”), which is a water source used by the Ngarkat Aboriginal people and which was located within the conservation park’s boundaries.

On 27 May 2004, the conservation park and the nearby Mount Rescue and Mount Shaugh Conservation Parks were abolished and their land holdings were added to that of the adjoining Ngarkat Conservation Park. As of February 2004, the conservation park covered an area of 303.43 square kilometres (117.15 sq mi).

In 1980, the conservation park was described as follows:

A sand plain with irregular dunes and interdune valleys. The predominant vegetation associations are Eucalyptus incrassata / E. foecunda open scrub, with Melaleuca uncinata callitris verrucose and Xanthorrhoea australis / Banksia ornata / Casuarina pusilla heath. Areas of E baxteri low woodland are found in low lying areas and in the lee of large dunes. Indigenous values are known to exist in this area. As yet these have not been identified, documented or assessed for national estate significance by the Commission…

Scorpion Springs is a wilderness area providing habitat for a great diversity of species, including the threatened red lored whistler and mallee fowl and the Tasmanian pygmy possum. The significance of this park is further enhanced by its continuity with Ngarkat Conservation Park and a large park on the Victorian side of the border. These parks combined, form a large wilderness area of National significance…

This park is in near pristine condition having suffered little grazing and possessing limited vehicular access. Scorpion Springs forms part of the largest block of natural scrub in the settled areas of South Australia.

The conservation park was classified in 2002 as being an IUCN Category Ia protected area. In 1980, it was listed on the now-defunct Register of the National Estate.

== See also ==
- Protected areas of South Australia
