= Kelvin Powrie Conservation Park =

Protected area in South Australia

- IUCN category III (natural monument or feature)
- Location within South Australia
- Location: South Australia, Coombe and Keith
- Nearest city: Keith.
- Coordinates: 36°01′54″S 140°17′32″E
- Area: 17 ha (42 acres)
- Established: 4 March 1971
- Governing body: Department for Environment and Water

Kelvin Powrie Conservation Park, formerly the Kelvin Powrie National Parks Reserve, is a protected area in the Australian state of South Australia located in the state's south-east in the gazetted localities of Coombe and Keith about 8 kilometres (5.0 mi) north-west of the town centre in Keith.

The conservation park consists of land located between the Dukes Highway on its south-west side and the Melbourne–Adelaide railway on its north-eastern side on the boundary between the localities of Coombe and Keith. The conservation park occupies land in the cadastral units of the hundreds of Archibald and Stirling. It was originally proclaimed as the Kelvin Powrie National Parks Reserve under the National Parks Act 1966 on 4 March 1971. It was renamed as the Kelvin Powrie Conservation Park upon the proclamation of the National Parks and Wildlife Act 1972 on 27 April 1972. Its name commemorates James Kelvin Powrie, a "research scientist who discovered the trace element deficiency of the soil in this area, (formerly the Ninety Mile Desert)". As of July 2016, the conservation park covered an area of 17 hectares (42 acres).

In 1992, the conservation park was described as follows:

1. Its landscape consisted of “a uniform limestone plain with isolated gently rising sand dunes” which passes through the conservation park in “a generally east-west direction” and which has soils described as being “generally deep acid bleached sands with a yellow-grey B horizon”.
2. Remnant native vegetation within its boundaries consist of a “pink gum low open woodland with a heath understorey” in its south, a”substantially treeless heath associated with low sandy rises” in its north and with “a band of coastal white mallee … woodland” passing through its centre from the north-west to the south-east along “the crest of the dune system”.

As of 1992, visitor facilities consisted of a “parking area and picnic site” catering “mainly for short stops by people travelling along the Dukes Highway” and a walking track that “leads from the parking area In a north west direction to the crest of a dune which affords a view of the heath association In the north” of the conservation park.

The conservation park is classified as an IUCN Category III protected area. In 1980, it was listed on the now-defunct Register of the National Estate.

== See also ==
- Protected areas of South Australia
