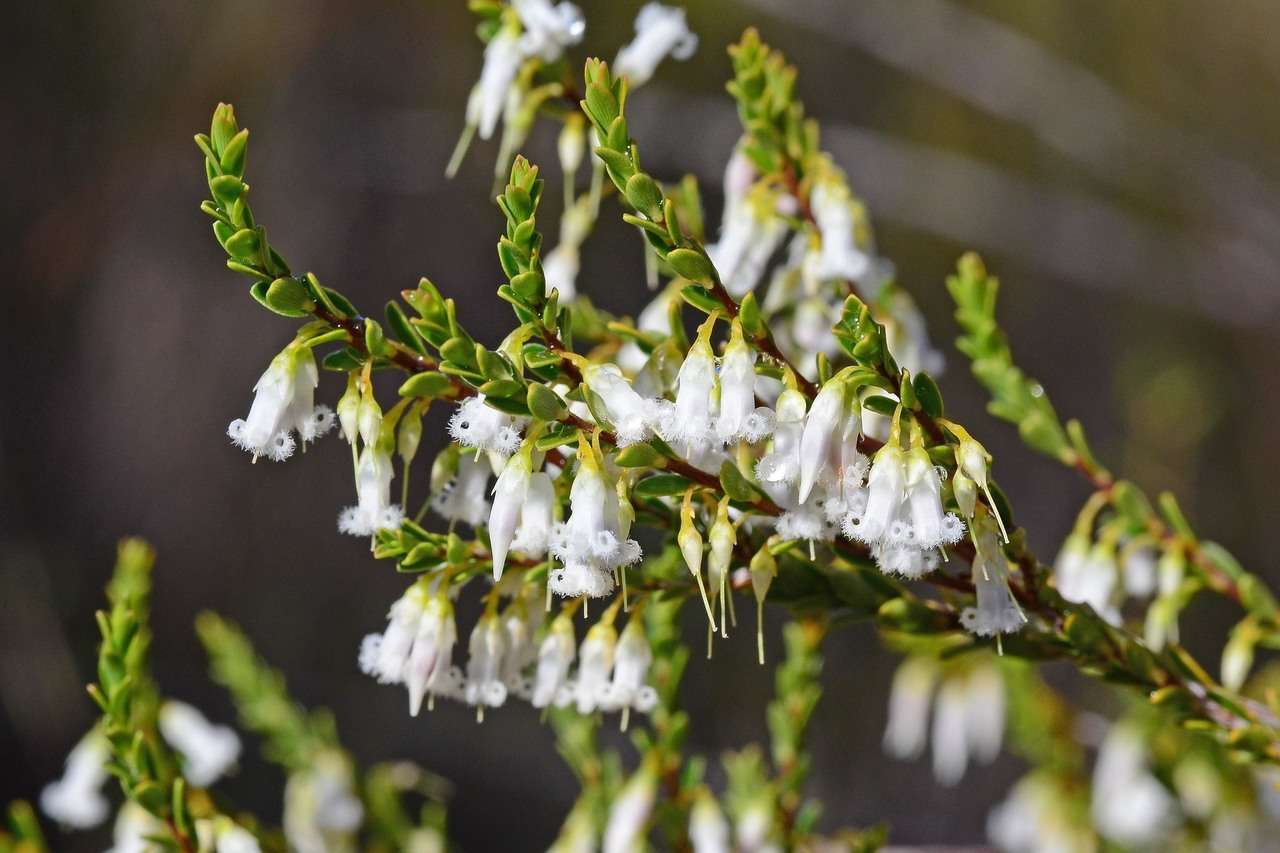
- In the Little Desert National Park

Scientific classification
- Kingdom: Plantae
- Clade: Tracheophytes
- Clade: Angiosperms
- Clade: Eudicots
- Clade: Asterids
- Order: Ericales
- Family: Ericaceae
- Genus: Styphelia
- Species: S. woodsii

Binomial name
- Styphelia woodsii (F.Muell.) F.Muell.
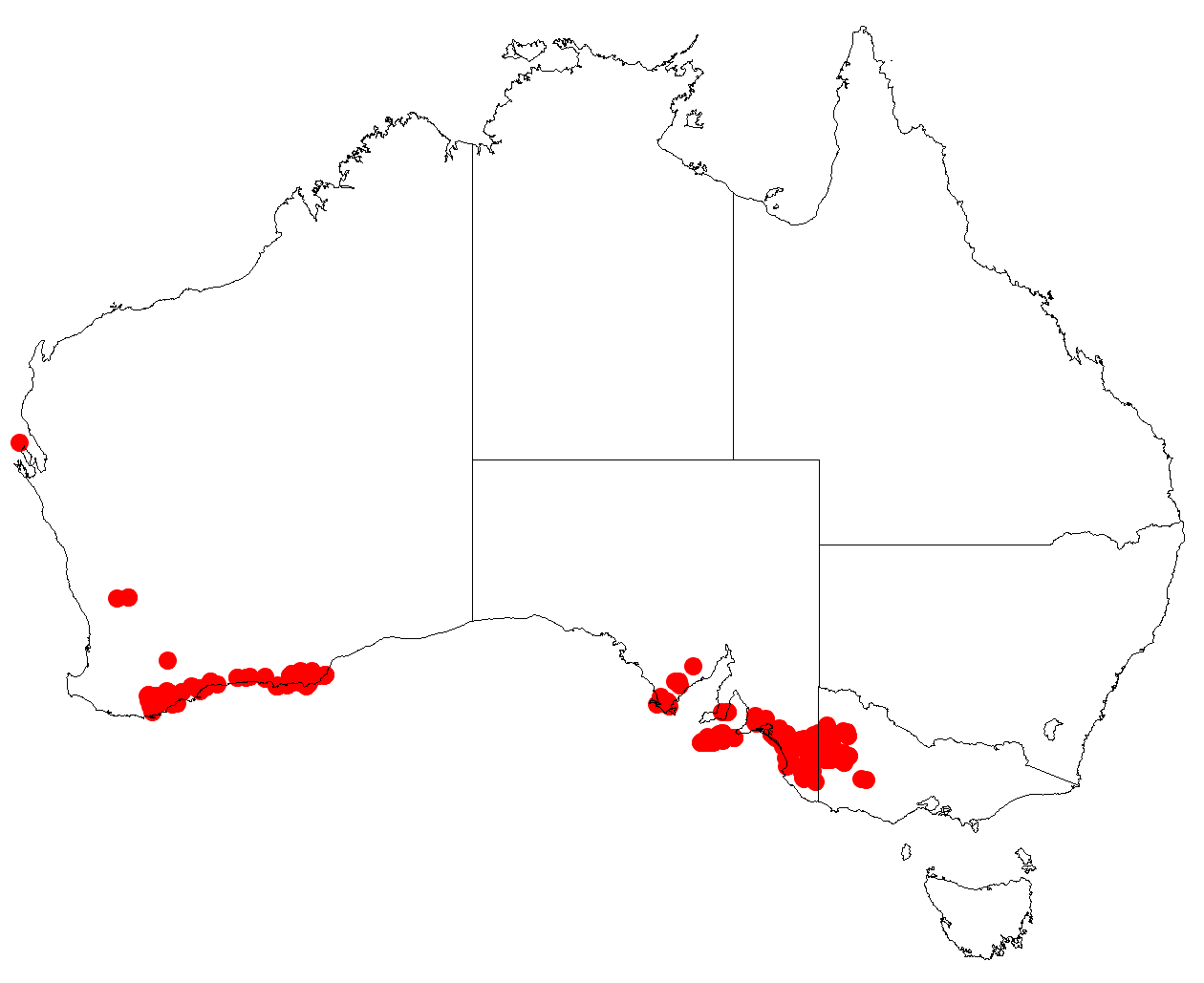
- Occurrence data from AVH

Synonyms
- Leucopogon woodsii F.Muell.

= Styphelia woodsii =

Species of plant

Styphelia woodsii, commonly known as nodding beard-heath, is a species of flowering plant in the heath family Ericaceae and is endemic to southern continental Australia. It is a slender shrub with more or less erect, egg-shaped leaves, and pendent white, tube-shaped flowers with densely bearded lobes.

== Description ==
Styphelia woodsii is a slender shrub that typically grows to a height of 20–40 cm (7.9–15.7 in), its branchlets greyish-brown and covered with tiny, soft hairs. The leaves are more or less erect, egg-shaped, sometimes with the narrower end towards the base, 3–5 mm (0.12–0.20 in) long, 1.1–1.9 mm (0.043–0.075 in) wide and more or less glabrous. The flowers are arranged singly or in pairs in leaf axils on a pendent peduncle up to 1.8 mm (0.071 in) long, with egg-shaped bracteoles 1.0–1.5 mm (0.039–0.059 in) long at the base. The sepals are egg-shaped, 1.5–2.2 mm (0.059–0.087 in) long. The petals are white 4.5–8 mm (0.18–0.31 in) long and joined at the base to form a cylindrical tube, the lobes much longer than the petal tube and densely bearded inside. Flowering occurs from February to June and the fruit is an oval drupe 4–6 mm (0.16–0.24 in) long.

== Taxonomy and naming ==
This species was first formally described in 1859 by Ferdinand von Mueller who gave it the name Leucopogon woodsii in his Fragmenta Phytographiae Australiae from specimens collected by Julian Tenison-Woods. In 1882, von Mueller transferred the species to Styphelia as S. woodsii in his Systematic Census of Australian Plants. The specific epithet (woodsii) honours the collector of the type specimens.

== Distribution and habitat ==
This styphelia grows in shrubland, mallee scrub and heath in deep sand or the crests of sand dunes in the Little Desert and southern Big Desert of western Victoria, in the south-east of South Australia, and in the Avon Wheatbelt, Esperance Plains, Jarrah Forest and Mallee bioregions of southern Western Australia.

== Conservation status ==
Styphelia woodsii is listed as "not threatened" by the Government of Western Australia Department of Biodiversity, Conservation and Attractions.
