= Powrie =

Powrie may refer to:

- Powrie or redcap, a malevolent mythological dwarf-like creature
- Powrie Castle, 16th-century castle located in the north of Dundee, Scotland
- Fiona Powrie (born 1963), head of the Kennedy Institute of Rheumatology at the University of Oxford
- Ian Powrie (1923–2011), Scottish country dance musician and fiddle player
- Polly Powrie (born 1987), New Zealand sailor
- James Powrie (1815–1895), Scottish geologist

== See also ==
- Kelvin Powrie Conservation Park, named after James Kelvin Powrie
