= Christmas Rocks Conservation Park =

Protected area in South Australia

- IUCN category III (natural monument or feature)
- Location within South Australia
- Location: South Australia, Willalooka
- Nearest city: Keith
- Coordinates: 36°21′09″S 140°21′19″E
- Area: 19 ha (47 acres)
- Established: 30 January 2014
- Governing body: Department for Environment and Water

Christmas Rocks Conservation Park is a protected area located in the Australian state of South Australia in the locality of Willalooka about 224 kilometres (139 mi) south-east of the state capital of Adelaide and about 29 kilometres (18 mi) south of the town of Keith.

The conservation park consists of crown land in Section 16 of the cadastral unit of the Hundred of Willalooka. It came into existence on 30 January 2014 by proclamation under the state's National Parks and Wildlife Act 1972. Its name is presumably derived from the geographical feature called Christmas Rocks which is located within its boundaries. As of 2016, it covered an area of 19 hectares (47 acres).

The conservation park is located on the east side of the Riddoch Highway about 4 kilometres (2.5 mi) north of the settlement of Willalooka. A visit to the conservation park is described by the Tatiara District Council as “a pleasant five minute walk” to the top of Christmas Rocks which is a hill composed of granite rocks which was part of an “archipelago” located in the “shallow sea” that covered what is now the Limestone Coast 25 million years before the present, for a view of the surrounding countryside.

Land within the conservation park's boundaries is known to be a site for Prostanthera eurybioides (Monarto mintbush), a species of plant which is listed as "endangered" both by the National Parks and Wildlife Act 1972 and the Commonwealth Environment Protection and Biodiversity Conservation Act 1999.

The conservation park is classified as an IUCN Category III protected area.

== See also ==
- Protected areas of South Australia
