= Hundred of McCallum =

McCallum
- Cadastral division
- Ngarkat Conservation Park

- Coordinates: 35.926°S 140.666°E
- Country: Australia
- State: South Australia
- Established: 19 October 1939

Area
  - Total: 360 km^{2} (138 sq mi)
- County: Buckingham
Lands administrative divisions around McCallum
Pastoral unincorporated	Pastoral unincorporated	Fisk
Makin	McCallum	Shaugh
Pendleton	Cannawigara	Senior

The Hundred of McCallum is a cadastral hundred of the County of Buckingham, centered on the rural locality of McCallum and the Ngarkat area in South Australia. It was proclaimed by Governor Malcolm Barclay-Harvey in 1939 and named for Thomas McCallum, member of the South Australian parliament upper house and pastoral pioneer in the Ngarkat area.
