= Mount Shaugh Conservation Park =

Protected area in South Australia

- IUCN category Ia (strict nature reserve)
- Location within South Australia
- Location: South Australia
- Nearest city: Bordertown
- Coordinates: 35°50′03″S 140°55′05″E
- Area: 34.74 km^{2} (13.41 sq mi)
- Established: 25 November 1971
- Governing body: Department for Environment and Heritage (2004)

Mount Shaugh Conservation Park (formerly Mount Shaugh National Park) was a protected area in the Australian state of South Australia located in the state's south-east in the locality of Ngarkat at the border with the state of Victoria about 235 kilometres (146 mi) south-east of the state capital of Adelaide and about 60 kilometres (37 mi) north of the town of Bordertown.

The conservation park consisted of land in section 5 in the cadastral unit of the Hundred of Shaugh located in the south-east corner of the locality of Ngarkat. The land first received protected area status as the Mount Shaugh National Park proclaimed on 25 November 1971 under the National Parks Act 1966. On 27 April 1972, the national park was reconstituted as the Mount Shaugh Conservation Park under the National Parks and Wildlife Act 1972. The establishment of both it and the Scorpion Springs Conservation Park were planned “concurrently with the development of adjacent areas for farming in the late 1960s” in order “to conserve the mallee heath habitat of the 90 Mile Desert”.

Its name was derived from 'Mount Shaugh', a hill with a height of 182 metres (597 ft) and which was located within the conservation park's boundaries.

On 27 May 2004, the conservation park and the nearby Mount Rescue and Scorpion Springs Conservation Parks were abolished and their land holdings were added to that of the adjoining Ngarkat Conservation Park. As of February 2004, the conservation park covered an area of 34.74 square kilometres (13.41 sq mi).

In 1980, the conservation park was described as follows:

Mount Shaugh Conservation Park is situated on an undulating sandy plain which features large irregularly shaped dunes of white-yellow sand. The principal vegetation associations are Eucalyptus incrassata / E. foecunda mallee scrub, Xanthorrhoea australis / Banksia ornata / Casuarina paludosa open heath or a blend of the two. E. baxteri low woodland over a heath understorey is commonly found on the lee side of the larger dunes…

An area of mallee / heath vegetation preserving habitat containing a wide diversity of flora and fauna. The significance of Mount Shaugh has increased with the dedication of the large adjacent Ngarkat Conservation Park. Mount Shaugh is now one of four South Australian parks which jointly form a large wilderness area continuous with a similar area in Victoria…

This park is in a minimally disturbed condition and is inaccessible to conventional vehicles. The dedication of a huge adjacent wilderness area as Ngarkat Conservation Park adds immensely to the integrity of Mount Shaugh Conservation Park.

The conservation park was classified in 2002 as being an IUCN Category Ia protected area. In 1980, it was listed on the now-defunct Register of the National Estate.

== See also ==
- Protected areas of South Australia
