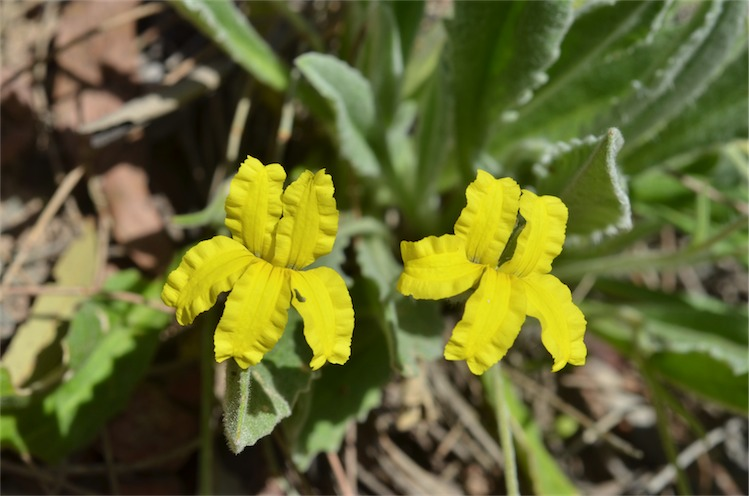
- Goodenia robusta in the Flinders Ranges

Scientific classification
- Kingdom: Plantae
- Clade: Tracheophytes
- Clade: Angiosperms
- Clade: Eudicots
- Clade: Asterids
- Order: Asterales
- Family: Goodeniaceae
- Genus: Goodenia
- Species: G. robusta

Binomial name
- Goodenia robusta (Benth.) K.Krause

Synonyms
- Goodenia geniculata var. robusta Benth.

= Goodenia robusta =

Woolly goodenia

Species of plant

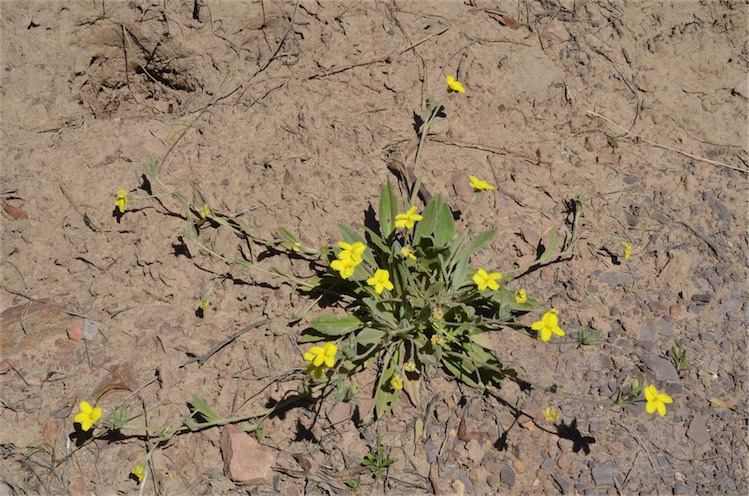
Habit in the Flinders Ranges

Goodenia robusta, commonly known as woolly goodenia, is a species of flowering plant in the family Goodeniaceae and is endemic to southern Australia. It is an erect or ascending perennial herb with crowded, hairy, elliptic to narrow oblong leaves at the base of the plant, and racemes of yellow flowers.

== Description ==
Goodenia robusta is an erect to ascending perennial herb that typically grows to a height of up to 40 cm (16 in). The leaves at the base of the plant are hairy, crowded, elliptic to narrow oblong, 40–120 mm (1.6–4.7 in) long and 8–20 mm (0.31–0.79 in) wide, often with wavy edges. The flowers are arranged in racemes up to 250 mm (9.8 in) long with leaf-like bracts, each flower on a pedicel 15–50 mm (0.59–1.97 in) long. The sepals are lance-shaped, about 5 mm (0.20 in) long and the corolla is yellow and about 15 mm (0.59 in) long. The lower lobes of the corolla are 5–6 mm (0.20–0.24 in) long with wings about 2 mm (0.079 in) wide. Flowering mainly occurs from September to January and the fruit is an elliptic capsule, about 10 mm (0.39 in) long.

== Taxonomy and naming ==
Woolly goodenia was first formally described in 1868 by George Bentham in Flora Australiensis and given the name Goodenia geniculata var. robusta.

In 1912, Kurt Krause raised the variety to species status as G. robusta in Das Pflanzenreich. In 1990, Roger Charles Carolin selected the specimens collected in the Marble Range by Johann Wilhelmi as the lectotype. The specific epithet (robusta) means "robust".

== Distribution and habitat ==
Goodenia robusta grows in mallee and woodland in the south-east of South Australia and in the Little and Big Deserts of Victoria.
