= Mount Monster Conservation Park =

Protected area in South Australia

- IUCN category VI (protected area with sustainable use of natural resources)
- Location within South Australia
- Location: South Australia
- Nearest city: Keith
- Coordinates: 36°12′00″S 140°19′07″E
- Area: 1.26 km^{2} (0.49 sq mi)
- Established: 30 September 1976
- Visitors: ‘regular use’ (in 1992)
- Governing body: Department for Environment and Water
- Website: Official website

Mount Monster Conservation Park is a protected area in the Australian state of South Australia located in the state’s south-east in the gazetted locality of Keith about 210 kilometres (130 mi) south-east of the state capital of Adelaide and about 12 kilometres (7.5 mi) south of the town centre in Keith.

The conservation park consists of land in sections 478 and 499 and in Allotment 11 of Deposited Plan 13037 all located within the cadastral unit of the Hundred of Stirling. It is located to the west of Riddoch Highway. The land includes Mount Monster, a hill with a reported height of 100 metres (330 ft) and which offers views over the surrounding area.

The conservation park was proclaimed under the National Parks and Wildlife Act 1972 on 30 September 1976 in respect to section 478 which was gifted to the state government by three surrounding land owners. Section 499 and Allotment 11 being added by proclamation on 18 February 2010. A separate proclamation made on 18 February 2010 ensured the preservation of access permitted under the state’s Mining Act 1971 to section 499 and Allotment 11. As of 2018, it covered an area of 1.26 square kilometres (0.49 sq mi).

In 1980, the conservation park was described as follows:

Small park surrounding Mount Monster, a granite inselberg of considerable geologic significance. One of few blocks of remnant natural vegetation in the vicinity, it possesses vegetation elements unique in the area, including the rare Callitris rhomboidea and Prostanthera eurybioides. Mount Monster represents the type locality and the only known South Australian outcrop of the Mount Monster quartz / feldspar / porphyry association…

A granite outcrop possessing a gradation of vegetation types. Rock and skeletal soils exhibit Acacia armata/Baeckea behrii shrubland association. At the edge of the rock where deeper soils begin a dense Eucalyptus odorata/A. pycnantha scrub association is found. Lower down over limestone ridges an open E. leucoxylon forest over a scattered herbaceous layer is common. As the soil becomes more sandy this grades into a low Woodland of E. fasciculosa /A. pycnantha and E. gracilis…

General vegetation condition is good though small areas are degraded. A small quarry adjacent to the park is of geological interest and would make a valuable addition to the park. The summit itself is a trig point reserve…

Land within and around the conservation park's boundaries is known to be a site for Prostanthera eurybioides (Monarto mintbush), a species of plant which is listed as "endangered" both by the National Parks and Wildlife Act 1972 and the Commonwealth Environment Protection and Biodiversity Conservation Act 1999.

As of 1992, it was reported that the conservation park was “used regularly by local residents for picnics, bushwalking and bird watching” and that it was “also a popular destination for bushwalkers and field naturalists”.

The conservation park is categorised as an IUCN Category VI protected area. In 1980, it was listed on the now-defunct Register of the National Estate.

== See also ==
- Protected areas of South Australia
