= Willalooka, South Australia =

Willalooka
- Town
- Coordinates: 36°23′38″S 140°20′56″E
- Country: Australia
- State: South Australia
- Region: Limestone Coast
- LGA(s): Tatiara District Council
- Location: 255 km (158 mi) southeast of Adelaide; 34 km (21 mi) south of Keith; 75 km (47 mi) north of Naracoorte
- Established: 16 March 2000

Government
  - State electorate(s): MacKillop
  - Federal division(s): Barker

Population
  - Total(s): 143 (2016 census)
- Time zone: UTC+9:30 (ACST)
  - Summer (DST): UTC+10:30 (ACST)
- Postcode: 5267
- County: Buckingham
- Mean max temp: 22.9 °C (73.2 °F)
- Mean min temp: 8.0 °C (46.4 °F)
- Annual rainfall: 414.9 mm (16.33 in)
Localities around Willalooka
Laffer	Keith	Brimbago
Petherick	Willalooka	Carew; Kongal; Swede Flat
Marcollat	Marcollat	Swede Flat

Willalooka is a small service town and locality in the Limestone Coast region of South Australia. it is located on the Riddoch Highway between Keith and Padthaway. Christmas Rocks Conservation Park is north of the town adjacent to the highway.

Services in the town include the Country Fire Service, a community hall, tavern, fuel and general store. The dominant industry in the area is farming, especially sheep.

Near Willalooka is the Darwent Waterhole, called by the local Aborigines kongal, meaning 'water mallee'.

Joseph Darwent, an American steamship owner who took up several pastoral properties near Willalooka in the 1870s. Not to be confused with Joseph Darwent (c. 1824 – 20 October 1872), an English accountant, secretary of the Adelaide City and Port Railway Company, then partner in Darwent & Dalwood who contracted for the northernmost section of the Overland Telegraph Line. Nor his nephew, Joseph Darwent, jun. (1847 – 10 August 1926), from Sheffield, who had a property near Coonawarra and lived in Penola, where he was a member of the District Council for 35 years and Chairman for 25.

The 2016 Australian census which was conducted in August 2016 reports that Willalooka had a population of 143 people.

Willalooka is located within the federal division of Barker, the state electoral district of MacKillop and the local government area of the Tatiara District Council.

== Hundred of Willalooka ==
Hundred of Willalooka
- Cadastral division
- Country: Australia
- State: South Australia
- LGA(s): Tatiara District Council
- Established: March 3, 1921

Area
  - Total: 380 km^{2} (147 sq mi)

Population
  - Total(s): 136 (SAL 2021)
- County: County of Buckingham
Lands administrative divisions around Hundred of Willalooka
Laffer	Stirling	Pendleton
Petherick	Willalooka	Wirrega
Peacock	Marcollat	Parsons

The bounded locality of Willalooka corresponds precisely in land area to the cadastral Hundred of Willalooka in the County of Buckingham. The hundred was named in 1921 after the earlier pastoral property in the area. Its surveyed area is a rectangle of 147 square miles (380 km^{2}).

== See also ==
- Aberdour Conservation Park
