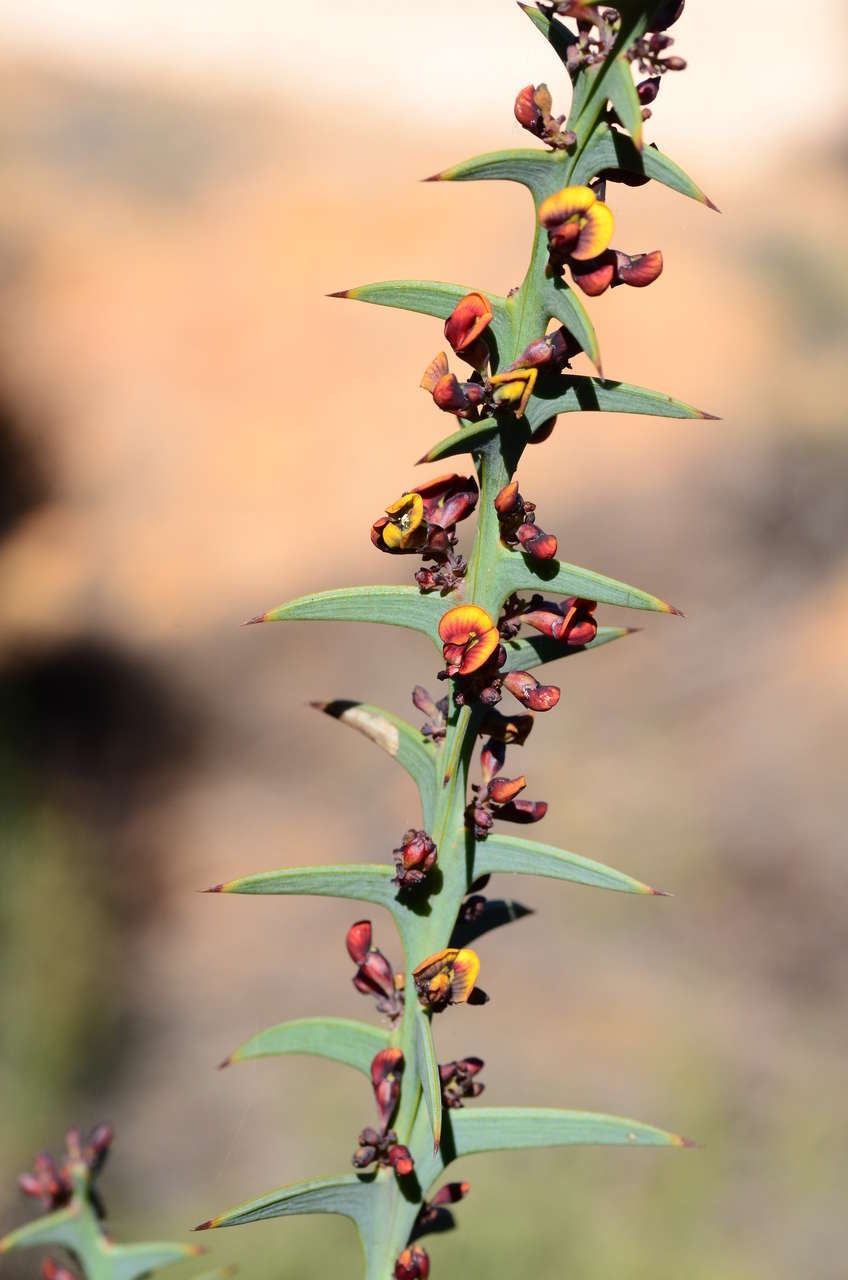

Scientific classification
- Kingdom: Plantae
- Clade: Tracheophytes
- Clade: Angiosperms
- Clade: Eudicots
- Clade: Rosids
- Order: Fabales
- Family: Fabaceae
- Subfamily: Faboideae
- Genus: Daviesia
- Species: D. pectinata

Binomial name
- Daviesia pectinata Lindl.

Synonyms
- Daviesia latipes F.Muell.; Daviesia pectinata Lindl. var. pectinata

= Daviesia pectinata =

Species of flowering plant

Daviesia pectinata, commonly known as thorny bitter-pea, is a species of flowering plant in the family Fabaceae and is endemic to south-eastern continental Australia. It is a dense, rigid shrub with erect, flattened branchlets, crowded, flattened, triangular phyllodes, and yellow to orange and reddish flowers.

== Description ==
Daviesia pectinata is a dense, rigid shrub that typically grows to a height of up to 1.5 m (4 ft 11 in) and has branchlets that are triangular in cross-section. Its phyllodes are vertically flattened, triangular and often crowded, 8–70 mm (0.31–2.76 in) long, 2–9 mm (0.079–0.354 in) high and sharply pointed. The flowers are arranged in leaf axils in one or two racemes of three to ten flowers, the racemes on a peduncle 1.0–1.5 mm (0.039–0.059 in) long, the rachis 2–10 mm (0.079–0.394 in) long, each flower on a pedicel 0.75–1.5 mm (0.030–0.059 in) long. The sepals are 3–4 mm (0.12–0.16 in) long and joined to form a bell-shaped base, the upper two lobes joined for most of their length and the lower three 0.5–1.0 mm (0.020–0.039 in) long. The standard petal is elliptic with a notched centre, 4.5–5.0 mm (0.18–0.20 in) long and 5–6 mm (0.20–0.24 in) wide, yellow grading to an orange to dark reddish base and yellow centre. The wings are about 5 mm (0.20 in) long and orange with a reddish centre, the keel 4–5 mm (0.16–0.20 in) long and orange-brown. Flowering occurs in September and October and the fruit is a flattened, triangular pod 8–10 mm (0.31–0.39 in) long.

== Taxonomy and naming ==
Daviesia pectinata was first formally described in 1838 by John Lindley in Thomas Mitchell's journal, Three Expeditions into the interior of Eastern Australia. The specific epithet (pectinata) means "in the form of a comb".

== Distribution and habitat ==
Thorny bitter-pea grows in open forest, woodland or mallee from the Eyre and Fleurieu Peninsulas to Goolwa in South Australia and in the Little Desert and Horsham areas of western Victoria.
