= Poocher Swamp Game Reserve =

Protected area in South Australia

- IUCN category VI (protected area with sustainable use of natural resources)
- Location within South Australia
- Location: South Australia, Cannawigara
- Nearest city: Bordertown
- Coordinates: 36°18′12″S 140°41′04″E
- Area: 77 ha (190 acres)
- Established: 14 November 1985
- Visitors: local use (no numbers stated) (in 1997)
- Governing body: Department for Environment and Water

Poocher Swamp Game Reserve is a protected area in the Australian state of South Australia located about 240 kilometres (150 miles) south-east of the state capital of Adelaide and about 8 kilometres (5.0 miles) west of the municipal seat of Bordertown in the locality of Cannawigara.

The game reserve consists of sections 12, 661 and 662 in the cadastral unit of the Hundred of Wirrega. It was proclaimed under the National Parks and Wildlife Act 1972 on 14 November 1985 in respect to sections 12 and 661 to provide "opportunities for hunting and other recreational activities". On 16 March 1989, land in section 662 of the Hundred of Wirrega was added to the game reserve. As of 2018, it covered an area of 77 hectares (190 acres).

The game reserve is classified as an IUCN Category VI protected area.

== See also ==
- Duck hunting in South Australia
- Protected areas of South Australia
