= Makin =

Makin may refer to:

== Places ==
- Makin, South Australia, Australia, a locality
- Division of Makin, an electoral division in South Australia
- Hundred of Makin, a cadastral unit in South Australia
- Makin (atoll), an atoll in Kiribati
- Butaritari, an atoll in Kiribati known to American military forces during World War II as "Makin Atoll" and "Makin Island"
- Makin, Pakistan, a town in South Waziristan, Federally Administered Tribal Areas
- Makin Tehsil, South Waziristan Agency, Federally Administered Tribal Areas, Pakistan
- Makin, Indiana, United States, a small town

== Military ==
- Makin Island raid, a 1942 raid by U.S. Marines on Japanese military forces on Butaritari during World War II
- Battle of Makin, the 1943 U.S. invasion of Butaritari during World War II
- USS Makin Island, two United States Navy ships

== People ==
- Makin (surname), a list of people

== See also ==
- Makin v. Attorney General for New South Wales (1894), a Privy Council decision on similar fact evidence
