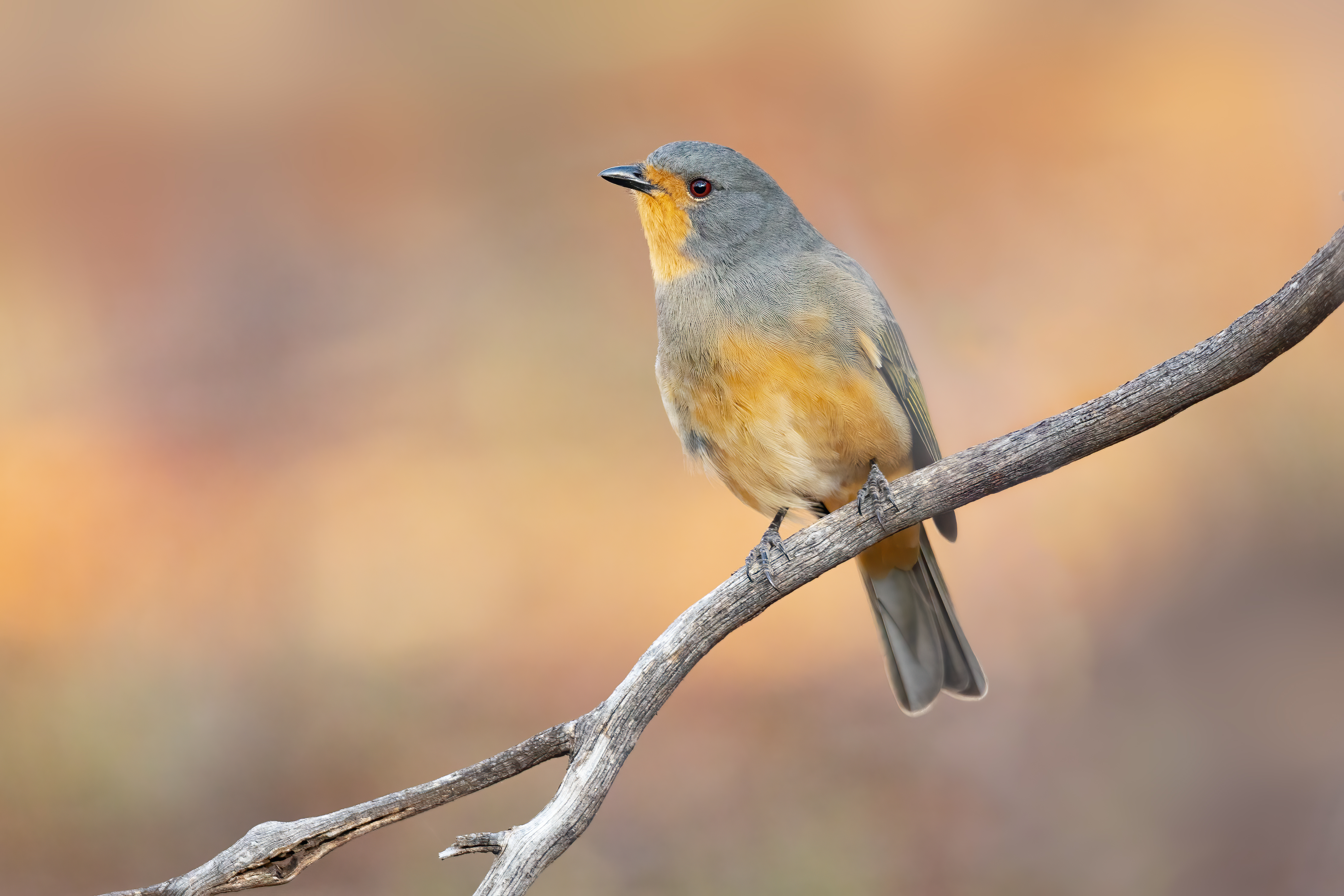

Conservation status
- Vulnerable (IUCN 3.1)

Scientific classification
- Kingdom: Animalia
- Phylum: Chordata
- Class: Aves
- Order: Passeriformes
- Family: Pachycephalidae
- Genus: Pachycephala
- Species: P. rufogularis

Binomial name
- Pachycephala rufogularis Gould, 1841

= Red-lored whistler =

Species of bird

The red-lored whistler (Pachycephala rufogularis) is one of nine species of whistler occurring in Australia and a member of the family Pachycephalidae which includes whistlers, shrike-thrushes, pitohuis and allies. The limited range of this endemic bird of the Mallee woodland in one small area in New South Wales and another, larger area encompassing north-western Victoria and adjacent South Australia has seen it listed nationally as vulnerable.

== Taxonomy and systematics ==
The scientific name refers to the red throat, lores and face and literally translates to thick head red throat (pachy – 'thick'; cephala – 'head'; rufo – 'red'; gularis – 'throat'). Whistlers were once known as thickheads. Alternate names include buff- breasted, red-throated or rufous-throated whistler or thickhead, and red-lored thickhead.

The monotypic red-lored whistler is a part of the corvoid radiation of oscine passerines, although there remains no clear consensus as to the position of whistlers within the Corvoidea or to the relationships within the Pachycephalidae.

== Description ==
The male has an orange/buff face and throat, a grey breastband extending around the neck and over the head and rufous underparts with pale yellow/olive edging to primaries. Some males are reported having a buff collar. The female is similar but with paler throat and underparts, with a hint of buff. The eye is red, and bill and legs are dark. They weigh 30–38 g (1.1–1.3 oz) and have a length of 19–22 cm (7.5–8.7 in). Unlike other whistler species the throat colour of the red-lored whistler extends upwards to include the lores and face, distinguishing it from the closely related and similar Gilbert's whistler (Pacycephalas inornata) which also has a red throat. Females and juveniles of both species are very similar, making them harder to distinguish although the red-lored whistler has a slightly more buff colouring. Field identification is further compounded by the fact that the range of the red-lored whistler fits wholly within that of Gilbert's whistler. Both species share the same habitat and have similar behaviour and calls. John Gould, who described both species, was not familiar with the Gilbert's whistler at the time he identified the red-lored whistler: this is surprising, as the path that he travelled took him through areas where the Gilbert's whistler is not uncommon. It is possible that, in the absence of specimens, even Gould confused the two species.

== Distribution and habitat ==
The red-lored whistler is a bird of the low mallee, spinifex, cypress pine and broombush woodland in the desert of central New South Wales, north-western Victoria and adjacent south-eastern South Australia, preferring low mallee woodlands or shrublands with open canopy, above a moderately dense but patchy scrub layer. Preferred vegetation has a post-fire age of 4–40 years, but it is most abundant in areas with a post-fire age of 21–40 years.

The species has long been regarded as sedentary, although the type specimen was collected in the Adelaide area suggesting some movement does occur. In South Australia, it is generally restricted to the Ninety Mile Desert country and mostly limited to the Riverland Biosphere Reserve. It is now regularly observed north of the Murray River at Gluepot Reserve. The population on the Eyre Peninsula is thought to be extinct, in central New South Wales the red-lored whistler is restricted to the mallee within Round Hill Nature Reserve and nearby Nombinnie Nature Reserve where it is regularly observed, although it was previously recorded at Scotia in south-western New South Wales. In Victoria, the red-lored whistler can be found in the Ngarkat / Big Desert / Wyperfield complex and the Murray-Sunset / Hattah complex of National Parks.

== Behaviour and ecology ==
=== Ecology ===
This red-lored whistler is shy, secretive and inconspicuous, with its cryptic behaviour making it difficult to see. While it is often seen perched in trees and shrubs, it feeds, for the most part, on the ground, and may be quite difficult to find. Little is known about the movement of this species, although it is thought to be sedentary, with some movement possibly after breeding, the extent of which is unknown. The red-lored whistler builds a substantial, cup-shaped nest made mostly of coarse bark and mallee leaves, neatly woven around the rim in low shrubs and lays 2-3 eggs.

=== Call ===
The presence of the red-lored whistler is most often revealed by its calls, which are described as charming, sweet, wistful and haunting with varied notes. Individuals respond to 'pishing' and will approach a 'pisher'.

=== Threats ===
Threats to the red-lored whistler include: loss of habitat through clearing, degradation, fragmentation and grazing by feral animals such as goats; fire and inappropriate fire regimes; population fragmentation from clearing and degradation of habitat; predation by foxes and cats; catastrophe, such as drought and wildfire; and climate change. ^{[6]}

== Status ==
Listed as Vulnerable on the IUCN Red List since 1 October 2016 and in the Commonwealth Environment Protection and Biodiversity Conservation Act 1999 (EPBC Act), large parts of its range are protected, as national parks and other reserves. The red-lored whistler is subject to a different conservation status in each state where it occurs. Population estimates in the year 2000 were around 10,000 and decreasing. The most recent estimate is not more than 2,000 mature individuals, with about half of these in the Riverland Biosphere Reserve.

New South Wales: Critically endangered under the Threatened Species Conservation Act 1995 since 2009.

South Australia: Vulnerable under the National Parks and Wildlife Act 1972.

Victoria: Threatened under the Flora and Fauna Guarantee Act 1988. Under this Act, an Action Statement for the recovery and future management of this species has not yet been prepared. On the 2007 advisory list of threatened vertebrate fauna in Victoria, the red-lored whistler is listed as endangered.
