= Makin Island =

Makin Island may refer to:

== Places ==
- Butaritari, an atoll in Kiribati known to U.S. military forces during World War II as "Makin Atoll" and "Makin Island"
- Makin (atoll), the local, and now preferred, name for an atoll in Kiribati adjacent to Butaritari, known to U.S. military forces during World War II as "Little Makin"

== Ships ==
- USS Makin Island (CVE-93), a United States Navy escort aircraft carrier in commission from 1944 to 1946
- USS Makin Island (LHD-8), a United States Navy amphibious assault ship commissioned in 2009

== See also ==
- Makin (disambiguation)
- Makian, a volcanic island in Indonesia
