= Aberdour Conservation Park =

Protected area in South Australia

- IUCN category III (natural monument or feature)
- Location within South Australia
- Location: South Australia, Willalooka
- Nearest city: Keith
- Coordinates: 36°19′28″S 140°25′38″E
- Area: 1.45 km^{2} (0.56 sq mi)
- Established: 28 February 1991
- Governing body: Department for Environment and Water

Aberdour Conservation Park is a protected area in the Australian state of South Australia located in the state's south-east in the locality of Willalooka about 226 kilometres (140 mi) south-east of the state capital of Adelaide and about 35 kilometres (22 mi) south of the town of Keith.

The conservation park consists of land in sections 7 and 80 in the cadastral unit of the Hundred of Willalooka. The Cannawigara Road which extends from Bordertown in the east to the Riddoch Highway in the west in Willalooka passes between sections 7 and 80 while Nankivell Road adjoins the eastern boundary with section 7. A fire access track is located inside the fence line on the western and northern boundaries while a disused quarry is located on the eastern boundary.

It was proclaimed under the National Parks and Wildlife Act 1972 on 28 February 1991 in respect to section 7, which was gifted to the state government by the Nankivell family. Land in section 80 which was formerly a stone reserve under the control of the District Council of Tatiara was added by proclamation to the conservation park on 16 February 2006. The name is derived from Aberdour Homestead located to the west of the conservation park on the east side of the Riddoch Highway in the locality of Willalooka. As of 2016, it covered an area of 1.45 square kilometres (0.56 sq mi).

In 1997, the conservation park was described as follows:

The park preserves an area of remnant vegetation typical of undulating dune and limestone country. Due to the extensive clearance in the surrounding area, the park provides an important habitat and stepping stone for many fauna species, particularly birds.

The conservation park supports the following three vegetation associations:

1. An open scrub of Eucalyptus diversifolia and Eucalyptus leptophylla located on a "rocky calcrete" ridge passing through the conservation park in a north–south direction and including other dominant species such as broombush (Melaleuca uncinata), slaty sheoak (Allocasuarina muelleriana), and silver broombush (Baeckea behrii).
2. An open scrub of Eucalyptus incrassata located on a "small strip" of sandy soil on the conservation park's northern boundary including other dominant species such as broombush, slaty sheoak and silver broombush, but distinguished from the previous association by "the presence of the canopy species E. incrassate and the scattering throughout the community of the dryland tea-tree (Melaleuca lanceolata)".
3. A woodland of Eucalyptus fasciculosa located along the eastern boundary.

Land within the conservation park's boundaries is known to be a site for jumping-jack wattle (Acacia enterocarpa), a species of plant which is listed as "endangered" both by the National Parks and Wildlife Act 1972 and the Commonwealth Environment Protection and Biodiversity Conservation Act 1999.

As of 1997, visitation consisted mainly of "local school groups" undertaking "environmental education".

The conservation park is classified as an IUCN Category III protected area.

== See also ==
- Protected areas of South Australia
