= Coombe, South Australia =

Coombe South Australia
- Coordinates: 35°57′38″S 140°13′02″E
- Established: 24 August 2000
- Postcode(s): 5267
- Elevation: 24 m (79 ft)
- Time zone: ACST (UTC+9:30)
  - Summer (DST): ACST (UTC+10:30)
- Location: 186 km (116 mi) SE of Adelaide; 105 km (65 mi) SE of Tailem Bend
- LGA(s): Coorong District Council
- Region: Murray and Mallee
- County: Buckingham; Cardwell
- State electorate(s): Mackillop
- Federal division(s): Barker
Mean max temp	Mean min temp	Annual rainfall
22.9 °C; 73 °F	8.0 °C; 46 °F	407.9 mm 16.1 in
Suburbs around Coombe:
Tintinara	Tintinara; Ngarkat	Makin
Tintinara	Coombe	Makin
Mount Charles	Mount Charles; Keith; Sherwood	Sherwood
- Footnotes: Locations; Adjoining localities

Coombe is a locality in the Australian state of South Australia located about 186 kilometres (116 mi) south-east of the state capital of Adelaide and about 105 kilometres (65 mi) south-east of the municipal seat in Tailem Bend.

Coombe ’s boundaries were created on 24 August 2000 and given the “local established name” which is derived from the Coombe Railway Station and ultimately from the cadastral unit of the Hundred of Coombe. Despite its name, the locality consists of land in south-east corner of the Hundred of Coombe in the west and the southern ends of the adjoining hundreds of Archibald and Makin in the east.

The Dukes Highway and Adelaide-Wolseley railway line both pass thought the locality from the town of Tintinara in the north-west to the town of Keithin the south-east.

Land use within the locality is ’primary production’ with exception to some land zoned for conservation on its southern boundary over the area proclaimed as the Kelvin Powrie Conservation Park.

Coombe is located within the federal division of Barker, the state electoral district of Mackillop and the local government area of the Coorong District Council.
