= Ngarkat Highway =

Highway in South Australia

Ngarkat Highway South Australia
- Coordinates: 35.304739°S 140.871435°E (North end); 36.253236°S 140.673883°E (South end)

General information
- Type: Highway
- Length: 115 km (71 mi)
- Route number(s): B57 (1998–present)

Major junctions
- North end: Mallee Highway; Pinnaroo, South Australia
- South end: Dukes Highway; Cannawigara, South Australia

Location(s)
- Region: Murray and Mallee, Limestone Coast

Highway system
- Highways in Australia; National Highway • Freeways in Australia; Highways in South Australia

Ngarkat Highway is a road in the southeastern part of South Australia, connecting Pinnaroo and Bordertown. It is designated as part of route B57 which continues north from Pinnaroo along Browns Well Highway to Loxton (concurrent with B12 on Mallee Highway for 7km west of Pinnaroo), and south from Bordertown along Naracoorte Road to Naracoorte (concurrent with A8 on Dukes Highway for 10km east of Cannawigara).

The Ngarkat Highway passes through Ngarkat Conservation Park.

== Major intersections ==
LGA	Location	km	mi	Destinations	Notes
Southern Mallee	Pinnaroo	0	0.0	Mallee Highway (B12) – Tailem Bend, Lameroo, Ouyen	Northern terminus of highway, route B57 continues north along Mallee Highway for 7km to Browns Well Highway
Southern Mallee	Sherwood	61	38	Emu Flat Road – Keith	
Tatiara	Cannawigara	104	65	Dukes Highway (A8) – Tailem Bend, Keith, Bordertown, Horsham	Southern terminus of highway, route B57 continues east along Dukes Highway for 11km to Naracoorte Road
Route transition
