= Makin (surname) =

Makin is a Spanish surname. Notable people with the surname include:

- Andrey Makin, birth name of Andreï Makine, French writer
- Bathsua Makin, English proto-feminist
- Callum Makin (born 2003), English boxer
- Chris Makin, British footballer
- Joel Makin (born 1994), Welsh squash player
- John and Sarah Makin, Australian baby farmers
- Kelly Makin, Canadian director
- Norman Makin, Australian politician
- Rex Makin (1925–2017), English solicitor and philanthropist
- Titus Makin Jr. (born 1989), American actor, singer, and dancer

== See also ==
- Makin (disambiguation)
