= Danielle Clode =

Australian author (born 1968)

- Clode in 2026
- Born: 1968 (age 57–58); Adelaide, South Australia, Australia
- Education: University of Adelaide (BA); University of Oxford (DPhil)
- Occupations: Academic; author; zoologist
- Website: danielleclode.com.au

Danielle Clode (born 1968) is an Australian author of literary nonfiction, history and children's books. She is an associate professor of creative writing at Flinders University.

Clode was born in Adelaide in 1968 and spent her early years in Port Lincoln, South Australia. She later lived on a boat with her parents travelling around Australia and completing her schooling by correspondence.

Clode received her B.A. at the University of Adelaide in 1989 and her D.Phil. in zoology at the University of Oxford in 1993.

== Career ==
Clode worked at Melbourne University and the Victorian Writers Centre. In 2011, she moved to Flinders University.

She has written reviews for Australian Book Review.

== Awards and honors ==
Clode was a Rhodes Scholar in 1990. She has received the Victorian Premier's Literary Award for Nonfiction in 2007 and a Whitley Award for Best Popular Zoology book in 2016.

Clode's 2018 biography of Australian naturalist Edith Coleman, The Wasp and the Orchid, was shortlisted for the 2019 National Biography Award. In Search of the Woman Who Sailed the World was shortlisted for the 2022 Adelaide Festival Awards for Literature Nonfiction Award.

== Bibliography ==
- Koala: A Natural History and Uncertain Future, W. W. Norton & Company 2023.
- Koala, Black Inc 2022.
- John Long: Fossil Hunter, Wild Dingo Press 2021.
- In Search of the Woman Who Sailed the World, Pan Macmillan 2020.
- First Wave: Exploring early coastal contact history in Australia (ed. with Gillian Dooley), Wakefield Press 2019.
- The Wasp and the Orchid: The Remarkable Life of Edith Coleman, Picador 2018.
- From Dinosaurs to Diprotodons: Australia's Amazing Fossils, Museums Victoria 2018.
- Killers In Eden: The True Story Of Killer Whales And Their Remarkable Partnership With The Whalers Of Twofold Bay, Museum Victoria 2011.
- Prehistoric Marine Life in Australia's Inland Sea, Museums Victoria 2015.
- A Future in Flames, Ligature 2010.
- Prehistoric Giants: The Megafauna of Australia, Museum Victoria 2009.
- Voyages To The South Seas: In Search Of Terres Australes, Ligature 2007.
- Continent of Curiosities: A Journey Through Australian Natural History, Cambridge University Press 2007.
- As If for a Thousand Years, Victorian Environmental Assessment Council 2006.
