= Ngarkat Conservation Park =

Protected area in South Australia

- IUCN category Ia (strict nature reserve)
- Looking north near Tym's Lookout, showing the effects of a past bushfire

- Location within South Australia
- Location: South Australia, Ngarkat, Parilla, Parrakie and Pinnaroo
- Nearest city: Keith, Lameroo & Pinnaroo
- Coordinates: 35°43′S 140°36′E
- Area: 2,666.23 km^{2} (1,029.44 sq mi)
- Established: 13 September 1979
- Governing body: Department for Environment and Water
- Website: Official website

Ngarkat Conservation Park is a protected area located in South Australia's south-eastern corner about 200 kilometres (120 miles) south east of the Adelaide city centre.

The conservation park was proclaimed in 1979 "to conserve the mallee heath habitat of the 90 Mile Desert". On 27 May 2004, the following conservation parks which adjoined the boundaries of the Ngarkat Conservation Park were incorporated into the conservation park and then abolished - Mount Rescue Conservation Park, Mount Shaugh Conservation Park and Scorpion Springs Conservation Park.

The conservation park is classified as an IUCN Category Ia protected area.

The conservation park occupies in land in a number of gazetted localities with the majority being in Ngarkat and the remainder being in Parilla, Parrakie and Pinnaroo.

== See also ==
- Ngarkat Highway
- Wyperfeld, Big Desert and Ngarkat Important Bird Area
- Mallee emu-wren
