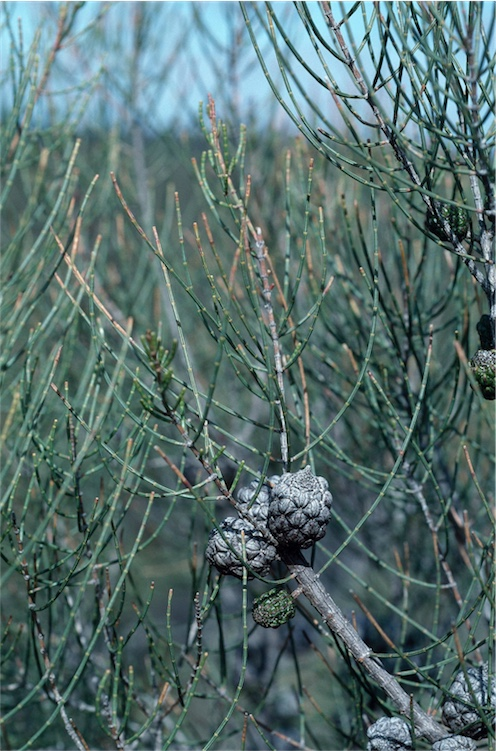
- In Wyperfeld National Park

Scientific classification
- Kingdom: Plantae
- Clade: Tracheophytes
- Clade: Angiosperms
- Clade: Eudicots
- Clade: Rosids
- Order: Fagales
- Family: Casuarinaceae
- Genus: Allocasuarina
- Species: A. pusilla

Binomial name
- Allocasuarina pusilla (Macklin) L.A.S.Johnson
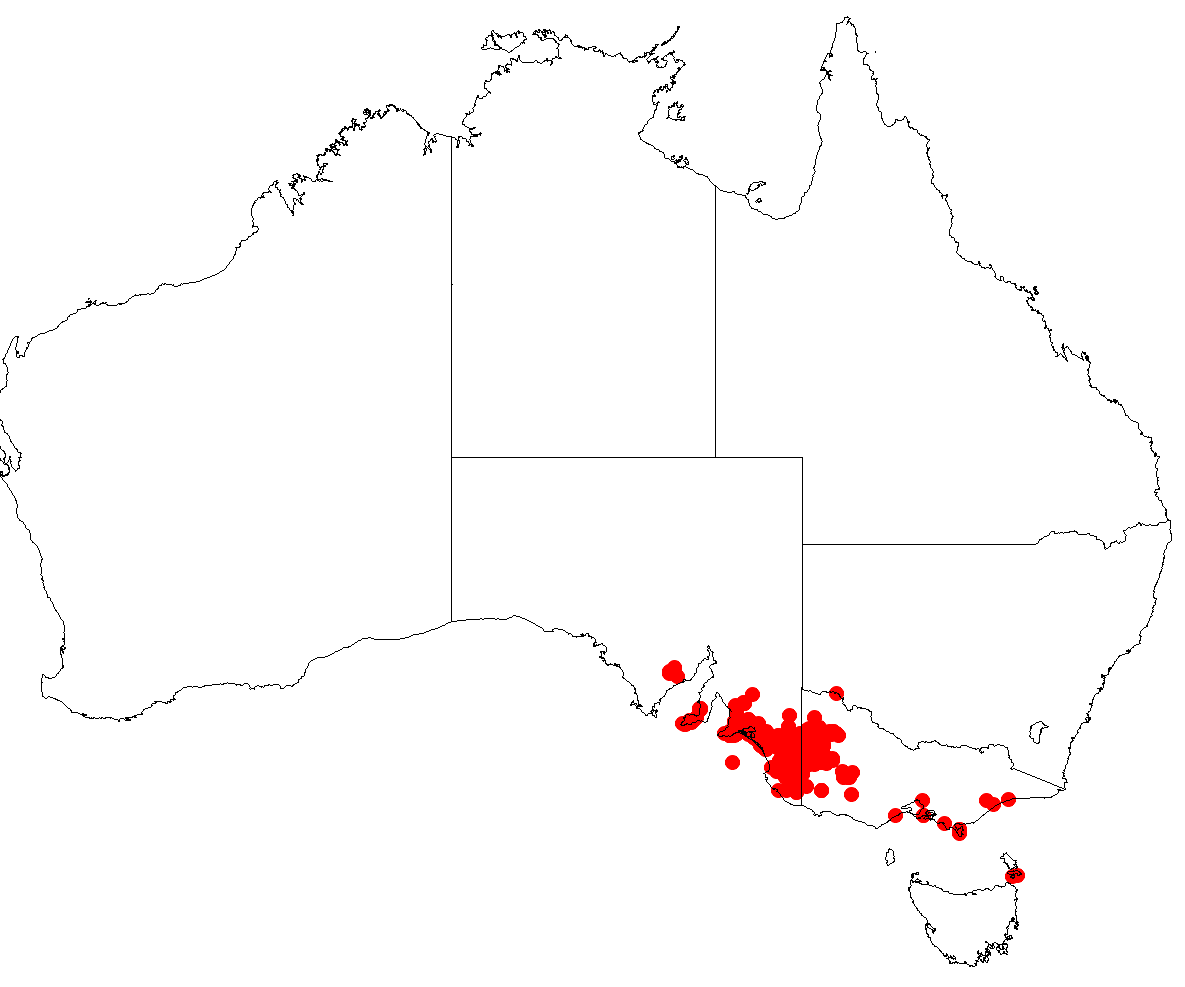
- Occurrence data from AVH

= Allocasuarina pusilla =

Species of plant

Allocasuarina pusilla, commonly known as heath oak-bush or dwarf sheoak, is a species of flowering plant in the family Casuarinaceae and is endemic to south-eastern continental Australia. It is a spreading, dioecious shrub with branchlets up to 120 mm (4.7 in) long, the leaves reduced to scales in whorls of five to seven, the fruiting cones 10–15 mm (0.39–0.59 in) long containing winged seeds about 5 mm (0.20 in) long.

== Description ==
Allocasuarina pusilla is a spreading, dioecious shrub that typically grows to a height of 0.2–2 m (7.9 in – 6 ft 6.7 in) and has smooth bark. Its branchlets are erect to spreading, up to 120 mm (4.7 in) long, the leaves reduced to overlapping, scale-like teeth 0.3–0.5 mm (0.012–0.020 in) long, arranged in whorls of five to seven around the branchlets. The sections of branchlet between the leaf whorls are 3–9 mm (0.12–0.35 in) long and 0.4–1 mm (0.016–0.039 in) wide. Male flowers are arranged in spikes 3–20 mm (0.12–0.79 in) long, with about 8 to 11 whorls per centimetre (per 0.39 in.), the anthers 0.6–1 mm (0.024–0.039 in) long. Female cones are sessile, the mature cones shortly cylindrical to more or less spherical, 10–15 mm (0.39–0.59 in) long and 8–11 mm (0.31–0.43 in) in diameter, the winged seeds dark brown to black and about 5 mm (0.20 in) long.

== Taxonomy ==
This sheoak was first formally described in 1927 by Ellen Dulcie Macklin who gave it the name Casuarina pusilla in the Transactions and Proceedings of the Royal Society of South Australia. It was reclassified in 1982 as Allocasuarina pusilla by Lawrie Johnson in the Journal of the Adelaide Botanic Gardens. The specific epithet (pusilla) means "very small", possibly referring to the habit of the plant.

== Distribution and habitat ==
Allocasuarina pusilla grows in heath on sandy soils from the Yorke Peninsula in south-eastern South Australia to the Big and Little Deserts of western Victoria in the south-east of continental Australia.

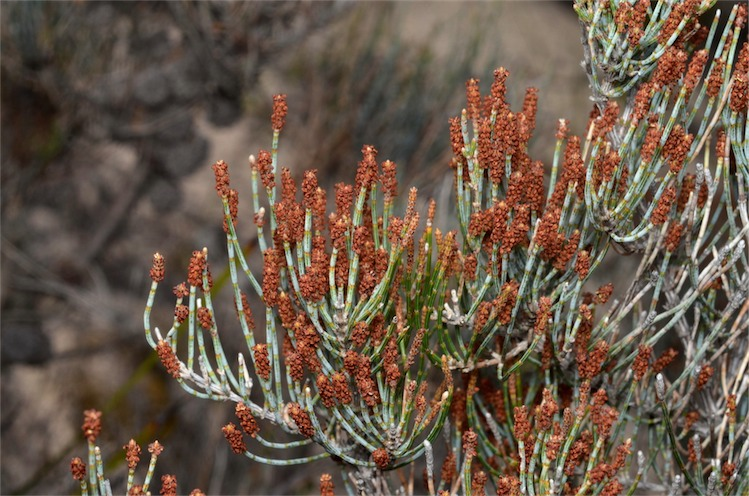
Male spikes

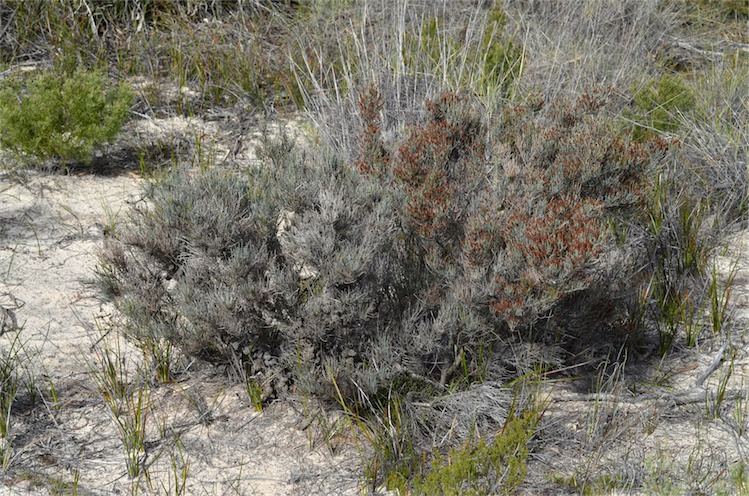
Habit in the Big Desert Wilderness Park
