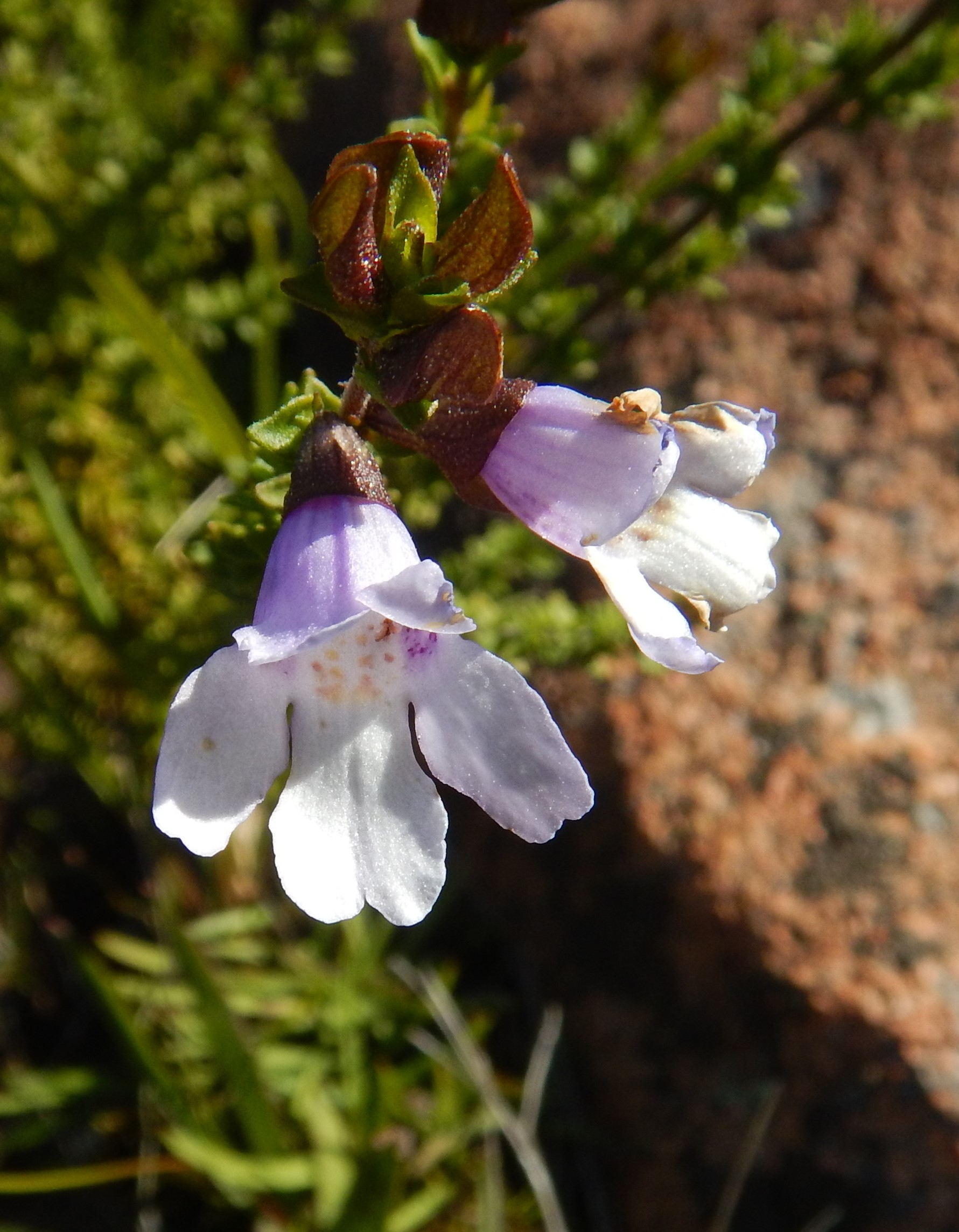
- In Mount Monster Conservation Park

Conservation status
- Endangered (EPBC Act)

Scientific classification
- Kingdom: Plantae
- Clade: Tracheophytes
- Clade: Angiosperms
- Clade: Eudicots
- Clade: Asterids
- Order: Lamiales
- Family: Lamiaceae
- Genus: Prostanthera
- Species: P. eurybioides

Binomial name
- Prostanthera eurybioides F.Muell.
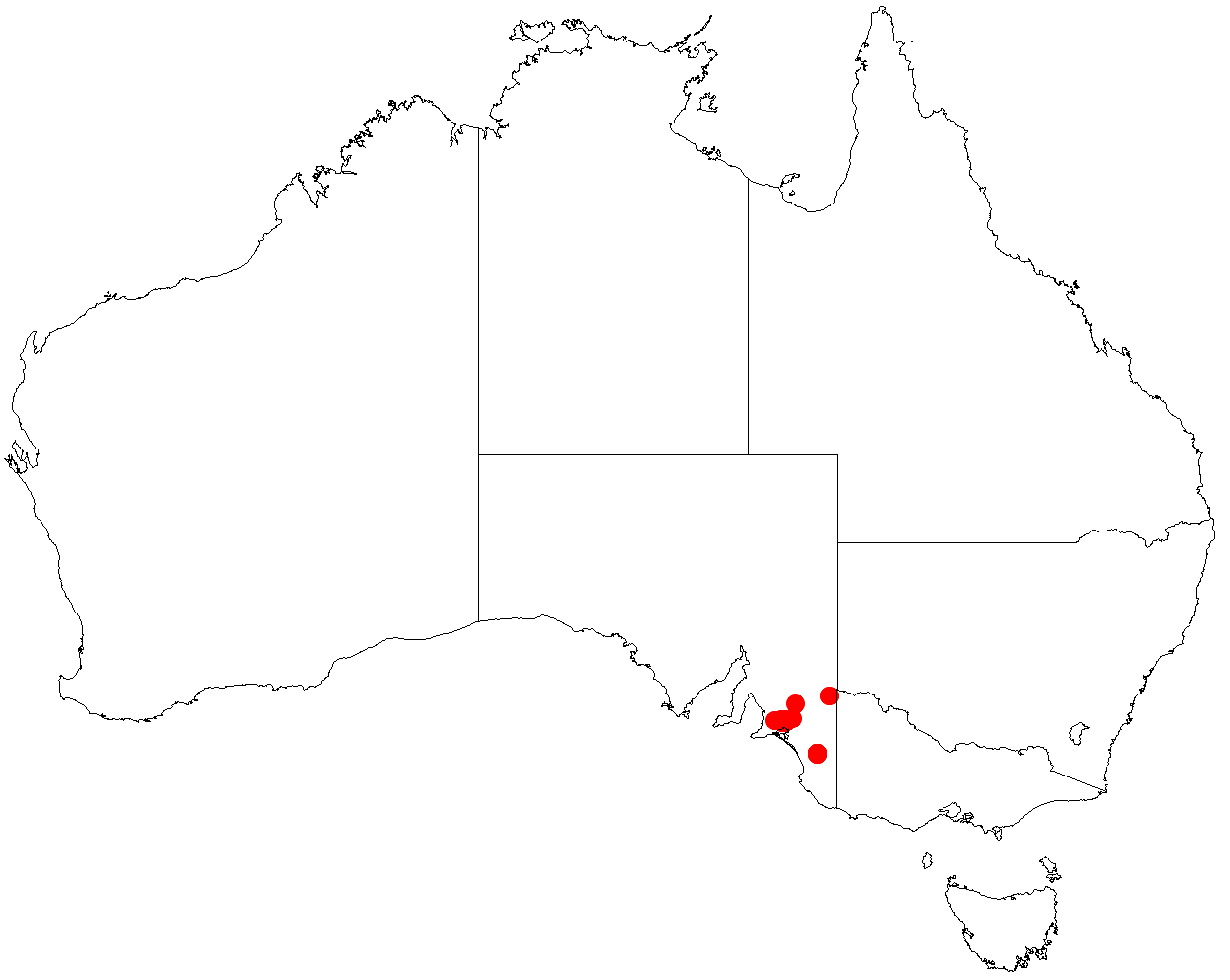
- Occurrence data from AVH

= Prostanthera eurybioides =

Monarto mintbush

Species of plant

Prostanthera eurybioides, commonly known as Monarto mintbush, is a species of flowering plant in the family Lamiaceae and is endemic to the south-east of South Australia. It is a low, spreading shrub with densely hairy branches, thick, elliptic to egg-shaped leaves clustered on short shoots, and violet to mid-purple flowers that are white with orange and dark purple dots inside the petal tube.

== Description ==
Prostanthera eurybioides is a low, spreading shrub that typically grows to less than 1 m (3 ft 3 in) high and wide and has more or less cylindrical, densely hairy branches. The leaves are thick, elliptical to egg-shaped, strongly aromatic when crushed, 2–2.5 mm (0.079–0.098 in) long and 1–2 mm (0.039–0.079 in) wide, clustered on short shoots and sessile. The flowers are arranged singly in twelve to fourteen leaf axils near the ends of branchlets, each flower on a pedicel 0.5–1.5 mm (0.020–0.059 in) long. The sepals form a tube 2.5–3 mm (0.098–0.118 in) long with two lobes, the lower lobe 1.5–3 mm (0.059–0.118 in) long, the upper lobe 1.5–2 mm (0.059–0.079 in) long. The petals are 10–12 mm (0.39–0.47 in) long, form a tube 6–7 mm (0.24–0.28 in) long, and are violet to mid-purple and white with orange and dark purple dots inside the tube. The lower lip of the petal tube has three lobes, the centre lobe spatula-shaped, 2.5–5 mm (0.098–0.197 in) long and 4–5 mm (0.16–0.20 in) wide and the side lobes 4–6 mm (0.16–0.24 in) long and 3–3.5 mm (0.12–0.14 in) wide. The upper lip is egg-shaped, 3–6 mm (0.12–0.24 in) long and 7–12 mm (0.28–0.47 in) wide with a central notch 0.5–2.5 mm (0.020–0.098 in) deep. Flowering occurs from September to November.

== Taxonomy ==
Prostanthera eurybioides was first formally described in 1855 by Ferdinand von Mueller in his book Definitions of rare or hitherto undescribed Australian plants.

== Distribution and habitat ==
Monarto mintbush grows amongst granite outcrops in mallee woodland in the Monarto and Mount Monster areas.

== Conservation status ==
This mintbush is classified as "endangered" under the Australian Government Environment Protection and Biodiversity Conservation Act 1999 and the Government of South Australia National Parks and Wildlife Act 1972. The main threats to the species are land clearing, quarry operation at Mount Monster, weed invasion, illegal rubbish dumping, trampling by walkers, and trail bike damage.
