= Victorian Environmental Assessment Council =

Victorian government advisory body

The Victorian Environmental Assessment Council (VEAC) was a body that provided independent advice to the State Government of Victoria, Australia. VEAC was granted the power to "conduct investigations and assessments, provide advice and make recommendations relating to the protection and ecologically sustainable management of the environment and natural resources of public land" (Victorian Environmental Assessment Council Act 2001). VEAC was established under the Victorian Environmental Assessment Council Act 2001, replacing the Environment Conservation Council (ECC), which in turn replaced the Land Conservation Council (LCC) which operated from 1971 to 1997. VEAC was abolished in 2026 when the Victorian Environmental Assessment Council Act 2001 was repealed.

The scope of the VEAC legislation was initially proposed to include assessments and recommendations about private land, although this was subsequently amended to focus solely on public land.

VEAC established the Bill Borthwick Scholarship to commemorate the 40th anniversary of the LCC and to honour the Hon Bill Borthwick, the Minister for Lands and Minister for Conservation during the establishment of the LCC.

The recommendations of VEAC and its predecessors have led to the protection of most of the national parks that exist today in Victoria. The most recent declared parks in Victoria (as of 2026) were the Wombat-Lerderderg national park, Pyrenees National Park and Mount Buangor national park, which were recommended by VEAC in their Central West Investigation.

Other investigations that led to the declaration of new national parks included the River Red Gum Forests Investigation, leading to the creation of the Barmah, Gunbower, Lower Goulburn River and Warby Range-Ovens River national parks.

Land-use change can be controversial and many VEAC investigations and assessments led to public debate about appropriate land use classifications for public land.

A history of the ECC and LCC by Danielle Clode was published in 2006.
