= Sherwood, South Australia =

Sherwood South Australia
- Coordinates: 36.088390°S 140.610370°E
- Population: 97 (2016 census)
- Established: 16 March 2000
- Postcode(s): 5267
- Time zone: ACST (UTC+9:30)
  - Summer (DST): ACST (UTC+10:30)
- Location: 222 km (138 mi) south-east of Adelaide; 30 km (19 mi) north-west of Bordertown
- LGA(s): Tatiara District Council
- Region: Limestone Coast
- County: MacDonnell
- State electorate(s): MacKillop
- Federal division(s): Barker
Mean max temp	Mean min temp	Annual rainfall
22.3 °C; 72 °F	9.1 °C; 48 °F	460.9 mm 18.1 in
Suburbs around Sherwood:
Coombe	Coombe; Makin; McCallum	Shaugh
Keith	Sherwood	Senior; Lowan Vale
Keith	Brimbago; Wirrega; Lowan Vale	Lowan Vale
- Footnotes: Coordinates; Locations; Climate; Adjoining localities

Sherwood is a locality in the Australian state of South Australia located about 222 kilometres (138 mi) south-east of the state capital of Adelaide and about 30 kilometres (19 mi) north-west of the municipal seat of Bordertown.

Boundaries for the locality were created on 16 March 2000 for the “long established name.”

Sherwood is served by Emu Flat Road which passes through the locality from the Ngarkat Highway in the east where the highway forms the locality’s eastern boundary to Keith in the west where the road terminates in the Keith town centre.

The principal land use in the locality is primary production. A parcel of land at its eastern boundary has protected area status as the Hardings Springs Conservation Reserve.

The 2016 Australian census which was conducted in August 2016 reports that Sherwood had a population of 97 people.

Sherwood is located within the federal division of Barker, the state electoral district of MacKillop and the local government area of the Tatiara District Council.
