= County of Buckingham (South Australia) =

Buckingham South Australia
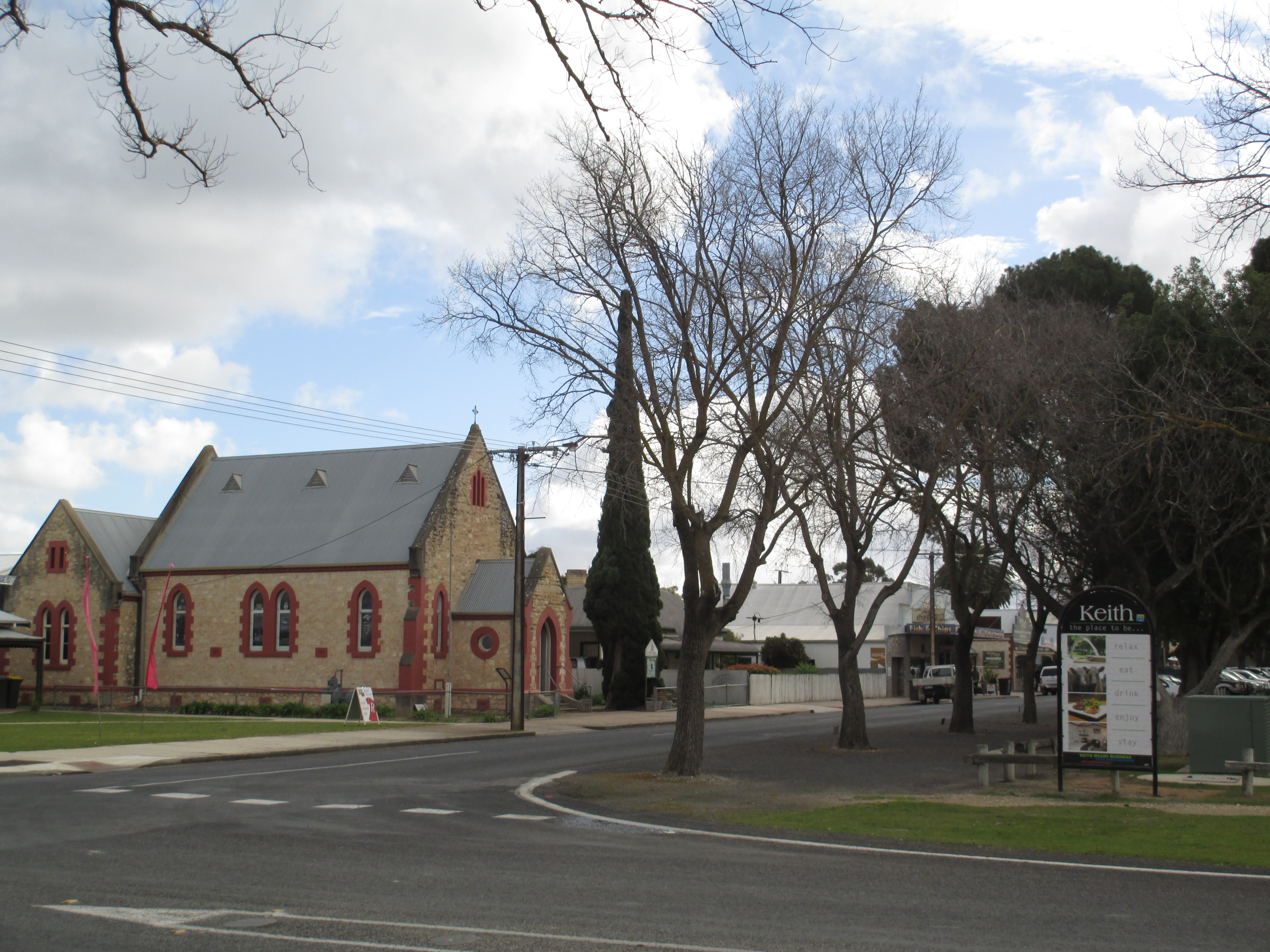
- Former church at Keith in the Hundred of Stirling

- Coordinates: 36.13°S 140.62°E
- Established: 1869
- Area: 4,652 km^{2} (1,796.1 sq mi)
- LGA(s): Tatiara District Council; Coorong District Council
Lands administrative divisions around Buckingham:
Buccleuch	Chandos	Weeah (Vic)
Cardwell	Buckingham	Lowan (Vic)
MacDonnell	MacDonnell	Lowan (Vic)

The County of Buckingham is one of the 49 cadastral counties of South Australia. It was proclaimed by Governor James Fergusson in 1869 and named for the third Duke of Buckingham and Chandos, Richard Temple-Nugent-Brydges-Chandos-Grenville who was appointed Secretary of State for the Colonies in 1867. It is located adjacent to the Victorian border in the state's upper south east. This includes most of the contemporary local government area of Tatiara District Council and a small east portion of Coorong District Council.

== Hundreds ==
The County of Buckingham is divided into the following 11 hundreds:

- Hundred of Archibald (Ngarkat, Coombe)
- Hundred of Makin (Ngarkat, Makin)
- Hundred of McCallum (Ngarkat, McCallum)
- Hundred of Shaugh (Shaugh)
- Hundred of Stirling (Keith)
- Hundred of Pendleton (Sherwood, Brimbago)
- Hundred of Cannawigara (Sherwood, Lowan Vale, northern half of Cannawigara)
- Hundred of Senior (Senior)
- Hundred of Willalooka (Willalooka)
- Hundred of Wirrega (Buckingham, Mundulla, southern part of Cannawigara)
- Hundred of Tatiara (Bordertown, Wolseley)
