= Cannawigara =

Cannawigara South Australia
- Coordinates: 36.25°S 140.67°E
- Population: 147 (SAL 2021)
- Established: 16 March 2000
- Postcode(s): 5268
- Elevation: 71 m (233 ft)
- Location: 264 km (164 mi) southeast of Adelaide; 10 km (6 mi) northwest of Bordertown
- State electorate(s): MacKillop
- Federal division(s): Barker
Localities around Cannawigara:
Wirrega	Lowan Vale	Senior
Carew	Cannawigara
Buckingham	Mundulla	Bordertown

Cannawigara is a locality in the Limestone Coast region of South Australia. It is crossed by the Dukes Highway and Adelaide-Melbourne railway line northwest of Bordertown. The southern end of the Ngarkat Highway is the Dukes Highway adjacent to the Cannawigara railway station. While the Dukes Highway runs northwest from Bordertown, Cannawigara Road runs due west.

The name of the locality is drawn from the railway station, which in turn was named for an 1851 pastoral lease. The word is an Aboriginal name for a long line of gum trees or a pathway of sticks over soft ground, and one of the six clans in the Tatiara region.

One of the major enterprises in the area is onion growing and there is a large packing shed near the former railway siding.

== See also ==
- Poocher Swamp Game Reserve
