= Wyperfeld, Big Desert and Ngarkat Important Bird Area =

Important Bird Area in Victoria, Australia

Coordinates: 35°37′49″S 141°18′53″E

Location of the Wyperfeld, Big Desert and Ngarkat Important Bird Area in Australia

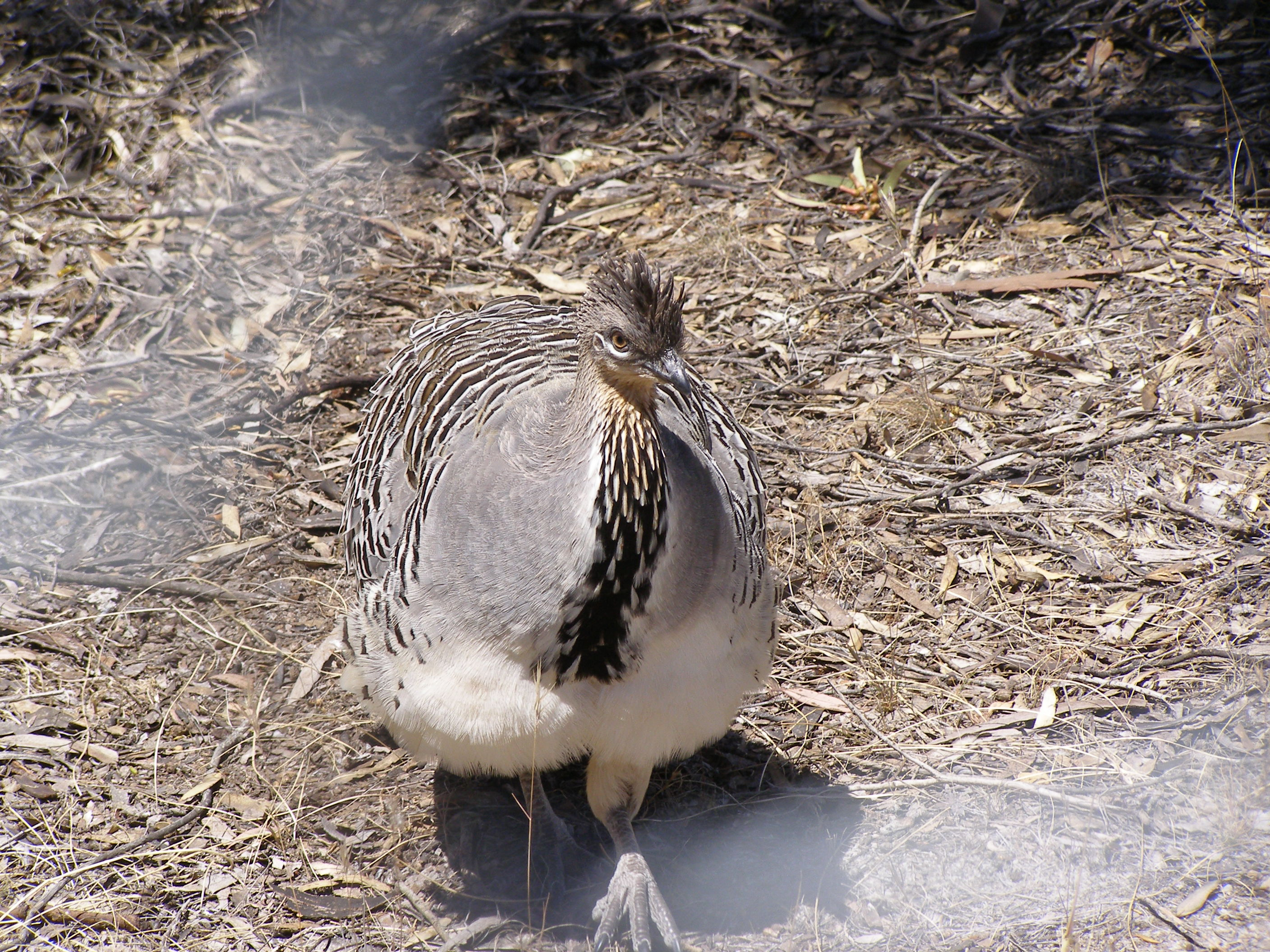
The IBA is important for malleefowl conservation

The Wyperfeld, Big Desert and Ngarkat Important Bird Area comprises a 9743 km^{2} tract of semiarid mallee woodlands and shrublands in south-eastern Australia, straddling the border between the states of South Australia and Victoria.

== Description ==
The site incorporates a large area of contiguous mallee habitat. It overlaps the following protected areas, the Ngarkat Conservation Park in south-east South Australia and the Wyperfeld National Park and the Big Desert Wilderness Park in north-west Victoria, as well as several adjacent smaller reserves and state forests. The Victorian part of the site contains a chain of ephemeral lakes connected by Outlet Creek, the northern section of the Wimmera River. The lakes only fill when the river over-fills Lake Hindmarsh, to the south of Lake Albacutya which adjoins the site.

== Criteria for nomination as an IBA ==
The site has been identified as an Important Bird Area (IBA) by BirdLife International because it supports populations of malleefowl, black-eared miners, mallee emu-wrens, red-lored whistlers, regent parrots and purple-gaped honeyeaters. The IBA is also thought to support up to ten pairs of Australian bustards and western whipbirds, the latter being one of very few remaining inland populations of the eastern mallee subspecies P. n. leucogaster.

== See also ==
- List of birds of South Australia
