= Makin, South Australia =

Makin South Australia
- Coordinates: 35°57′19″S 140°31′01″E
- Population: 30 (2016 census)
- Established: 16 March 2000
- Postcode(s): 5267
- Time zone: ACST (UTC+9:30)
  - Summer (DST): ACST (UTC+10:30)
- Location: 208 km (129 mi) south-east of Adelaide; 50 km (31 mi) north-west of Bordertown
- LGA(s): Tatiara District Council
- Region: Limestone Coast
- County: Buckingham
- State electorate(s): MacKillop
- Federal division(s): Barker
| Mean max temp | Mean min temp | Annual rainfall |
| 22.3 °C; 72 °F | 9.1 °C; 48 °F | 460.9 mm 18.1 in |
Suburbs around Makin:
| Ngarkat | Ngarkat | Ngarkat |
| Ngarkat; Coombe | Makin | McCallum |
| Sherwood | Sherwood | Sherwood |
- Footnotes: Coordinates; Locations; Climate; Adjoining localities

Makin is a locality in the Australian state of South Australia located on the state’s south-east, about 208 kilometres (129 mi) south-east of the state capital of Adelaide and about 50 kilometres (31 mi) north-west of the municipal seat of Bordertown.

Its name and boundaries for the locality were assigned in March 2000 for the portion within the Tatiara District Council, while the portion within the Coorong District Council was added in August 2000. Makin’s name is derived from the cadastral unit of the Hundred of Makin, which was named after James Bain Makin 1855-1933), a pastoralist who lived in the vicinity of what is now the hundred.

The principal land use in the locality is primary production.

The 2016 Australian census, which was conducted in August 2016, reports that Makin had a population of 30 people.

Makin is located within the federal division of Barker, the state electoral district of Mackillop, and the local government area of the Tatiara District Council.
