= James Powrie =

19th-century Scottish geologist, palaeontologist and astronomer

James Powrie FRSE FGS (1814–1895) was a 19th-century Scottish geologist, palaeontologist, and astronomer remembered primarily for his contributions to the geology and palaeoichthyology of the Old Red Sandstone in Scotland

== Life ==
Powrie was born in Dundee in 1814 the son of William Powrie (1770–1845), a Dundee merchant and manufacturer with premises at East Chapelshade (sic). Powrie Lane in Dundee appears to be named after him. His brother Thomas Powrie appears to have run the family business in the 1830s.

James studied at St Andrews University, matriculating in 1830 and later receiving an MA. In 1845 he inherited his father's business in Dundee and the Reswallie estate.

Powrie was elected a fellow of the Geological Society of London and the Edinburgh Geological Society. In 1865 he was elected a Fellow of the Royal Society of Edinburgh; his proposer was David Page. In 1868/9 he served as vice president of the Edinburgh Geological Society.

Powrie regularly corresponded with the botanist George Gordon, Charles William Peach, Sir Edwin Lankester, Henry Woodward, among others.

He died of a heart attack on 25 May 1895. He is buried in the family plot at Rescobie churchyard near Forfar.

Much of his important fossil collection was purchased by the National Museum of Scotland. Some of Powrie's fossils can also be found in the Natural History Museum (London) and the Hancock Museum (Newcastle upon Tyne).

== Publications ==
- On the Old Red Sandstone and its Fossil Fish in Forfarshire (1860)
- On the Old Red Sandstone Rocks of Forfarshire (1861)
- Fish in the Old Red Sandstone (1867)

== Family ==
He was married to Mary Dickson (died 1903).

They had a son Thomas Powrie (1843–1933) and daughter Isabella Powrie (died 1939).
