= Hundred of Senior =

The Hundred of Senior is a Hundred of the County of Buckingham (South Australia) centered on the locality of Senior, South Australia.
