= Hundred of Makin =

- Cadastral division
- Coordinates: 35°55′06″S 140°30′24″E
- Country: Australia
- State: South Australia
- Region: Limestone Coast
- LGA(s): Coorong District Council Tatiara District Council
- Established: 19 October 1939

Area
  - Total: 348 km^{2} (134.5 sq mi)
- County: Buckingham
Lands administrative divisions around Hundred of Makin
nil	nil	nil
Archibald	Hundred of Makin	Cannawigara
Stirling	Pendleton	Pendleton
- Coordinates; Adjoining Hundreds

The Hundred of Makin is a cadastral unit of hundred located in the Australian state of South Australia within the County of Buckingham and the state government region of the Limestone Coast about 210 kilometres (130 mi) south-east of the state capital of Adelaide and about 50 kilometres (31 mi) north-west and 120 kilometres (75 mi) south-east respectively of the municipal seats of Bordertown and Tailem Bend.

Its extent includes part of the locality of Ngarkat in its northern half while its southern half is occupied by the entirety of the locality of Makin along with portions of Coombe and MacCallum in the west and in the east respectively.
