= Hundred of Stirling =

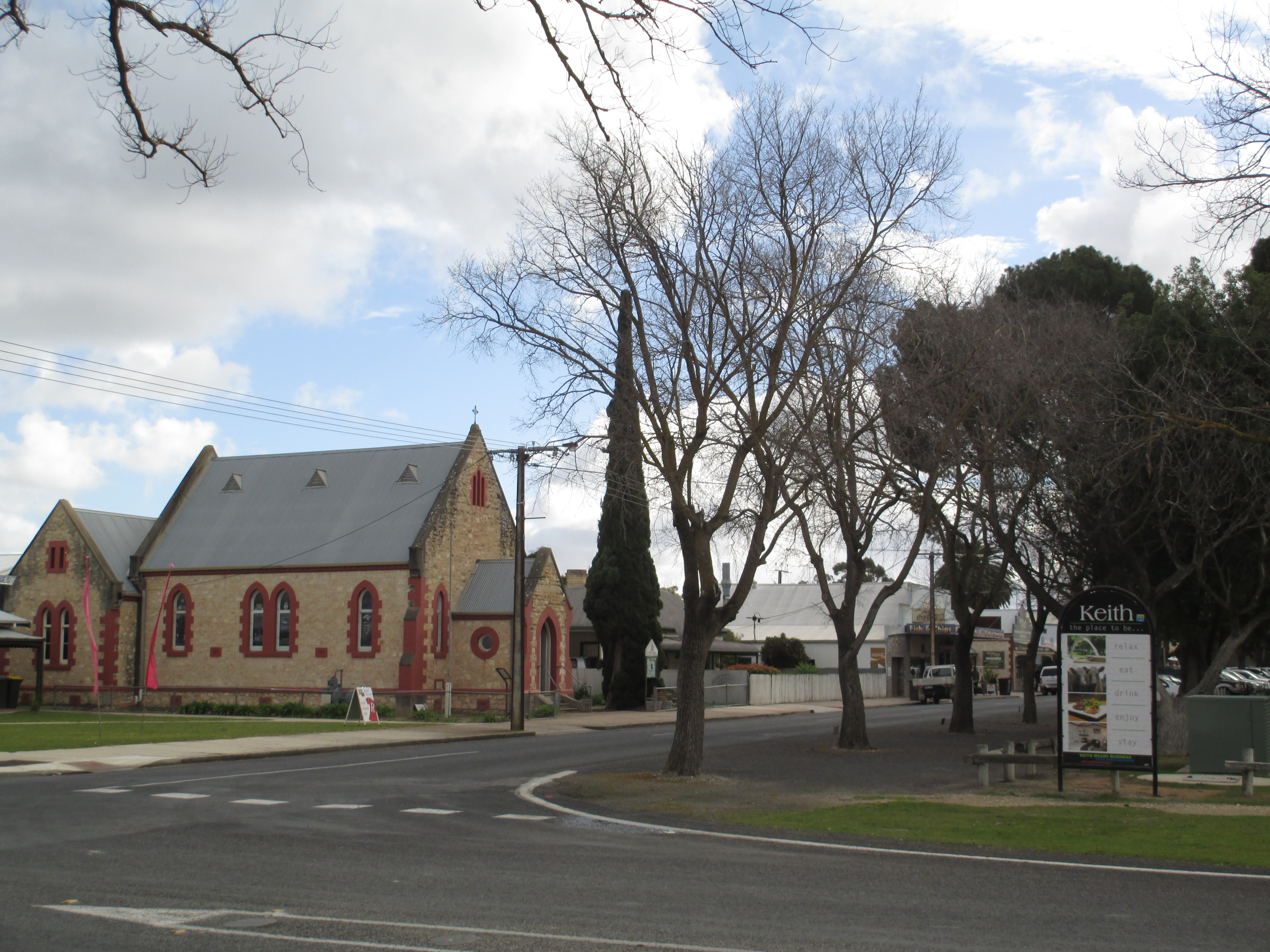
Former church at Keith.

The Hundred of Stirling is a Hundred of the County of Buckingham (South Australia), centered on Keith, South Australia, South east of Adelaide, South Australia.

It is in the Tatiara District Council Area.
