= Big Desert Wilderness Park =

- IUCN category Ib (wilderness area)
- Location within Victoria
- Location: Victoria
- Coordinates: 35.6582°S 141.1326°E
- Area: 1,417.49 km^{2} (547.30 sq mi)
- Established: 26 April 1979
- Governing body: Parks Victoria

The Big Desert Wilderness Park is a protected area in the Australian state of Victoria, Australia located in the state's west adjoining the border with South Australia. It is the oldest of Victoria's three wilderness parks.

The wilderness park consists of an area of 1,417.49 square kilometres (547 sq mi), with no vehicular access, and no defined walking tracks. It includes part of the Big Desert and also adjoins Ninety Mile Desert across the border in South Australia. As it is a dedicated wilderness area, there are no facilities of any kind, including toilets or campsites. However, hiking and small fuel stoves are permitted. The wilderness park is overlapped by the Wyperfeld, Big Desert and Ngarkat Important Bird Area which identified as such by BirdLife International because of its importance for the conservation of malleefowl and other species of mallee birds.

A large bushfire was ignited by lightning in the park in 2002 then spread rapidly due to strong winds and dry fuel. The fire soon joined another in the adjoining Wyperfield National Park and an area of 1,814 square kilometres (700 sq mi) was burned out. The fire burned for two weeks resulting in the loss of an abandoned house and 400 hectares (988 acres) of private property.

== See also ==
- Protected areas of Victoria
