= Ninety Mile Desert =

Desert in South Australia

Coordinates: 35°53′23″S 140°05′37″E

Location in South Australia

The Ninety Mile Desert is an area in the Australian state of South Australia. It is described either as a desert or as a plain and which has been officially known as Coonalpyn Downs since 1949.
