= Keith, South Australia =

Keith
- Town
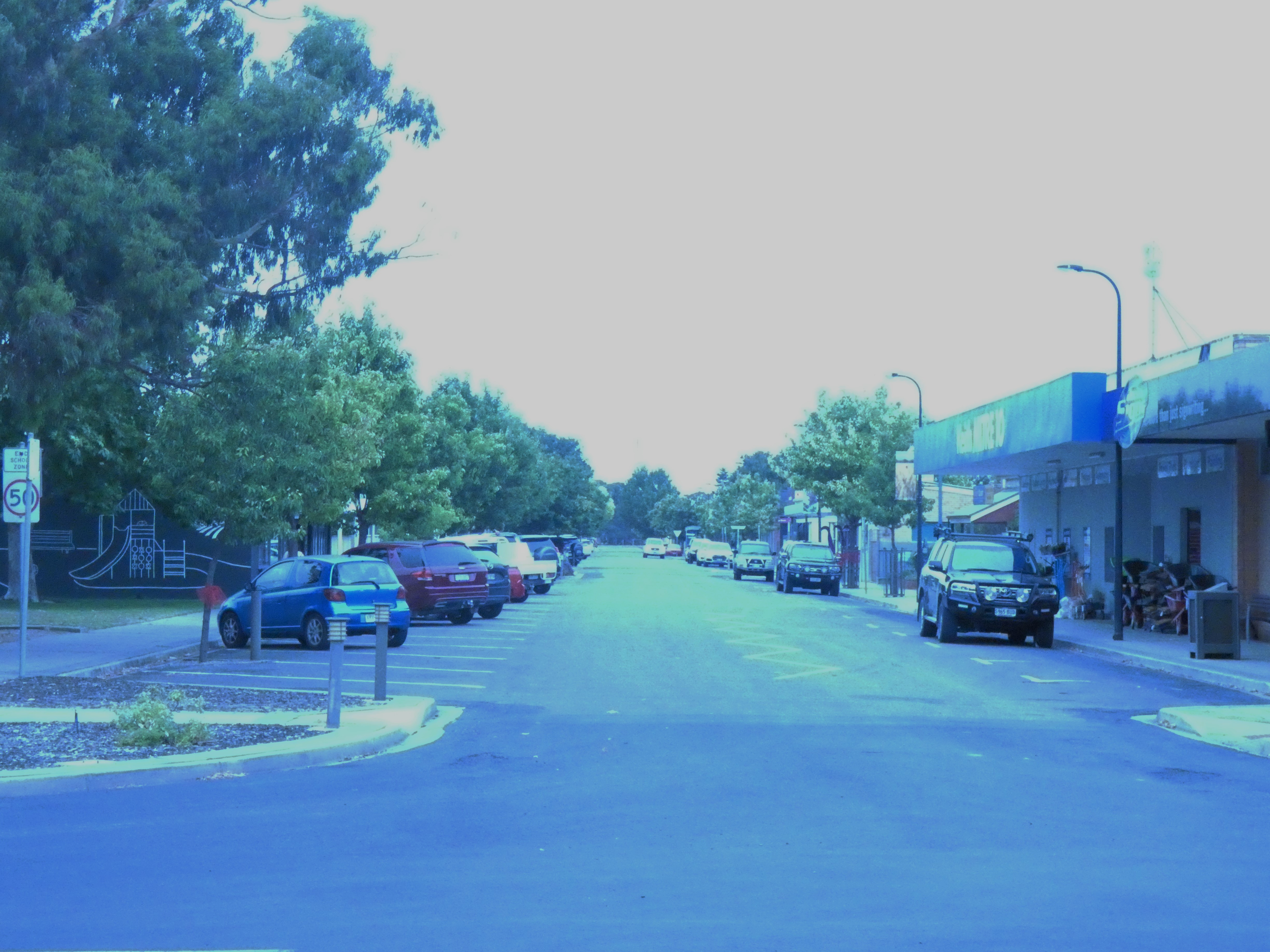
- Hender Street in 2022

- Coordinates: 36°05′57″S 140°21′15″E
- Country: Australia
- State: South Australia
- Region: Limestone Coast
- LGA: Tatiara District Council
- Established: 5 September 1669(town); 16 March 2000 (locality)

Government
  - State electorate: MacKillop
  - Federal division: Barker
- Elevation: 31 m (102 ft)

Population
  - Totals: 1,140 (town) (2021 census); 1,405 (locality) (2021 census)
- Time zone: UTC+9:30 (ACST)
  - Summer (DST): UTC+10:30 (ACST)
- Postcode: 5267
- County: MacDonnell
- Mean max temp: 22.2 °C (72.0 °F)
- Mean min temp: 9.1 °C (48.4 °F)
- Annual rainfall: 462.0 mm (18.19 in)
Localities around Keith
| Coombe | Coombe | Coombe |
| Mount Charles; Laffer | Keith | Sherwood; Brimbago |
| Petherick | Willalooka | Carew |

Keith is a town and a locality in the Australian state of South Australia located in the state's south-east about 225 kilometres (140 mi) from the state capital of Adelaide at the junction of the Dukes Highway and the Riddoch Highway. It is sometimes referred to as the "lucerne capital of Australia" due to the high number of lucerne growers in the region.

At the 2021 Australian census, Keith had a population of 1,405, of whom 1,140 lived in the town centre.

== History ==
A large granite outcrop outside the town called Mount Monster was a basis for the area's name until it was surveyed in 1884 and officially proclaimed Keith in 1889. It is believed that the town is named after the home town of the Governor of South Australia at the time, Lord Kintore. His home in Aberdeenshire in Scotland was called Keith Hall and he was also known as Earl of Kintore. The post office opened around 1874 as Mount Monster and was renamed Keith in 1904. In 1905 the general store was opened, and in 1907 the education department rented rooms out of the local institute to use as the school. 1910 saw the opening of Keith Hotel and the town's provisional school became a public school in 1912.

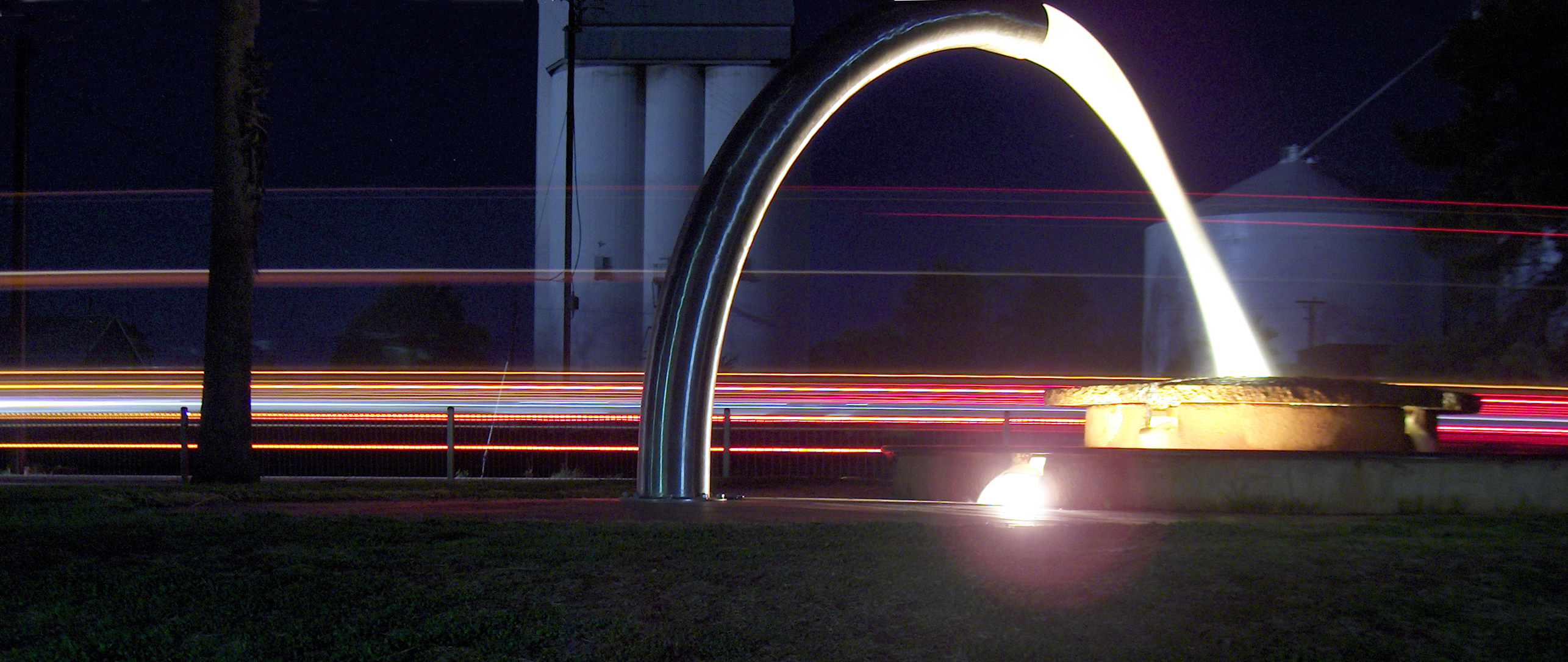
Water feature in Keith

During the 1940s, the CSIRO found prosperity in the area. With the addition of trace elements, the area became very productive. The AMP Society funded the clearing of land to set up farming establishments. A Land Rover sits atop a pole in a historical landmark in the town. In 1957, the local school was made into an area school to accommodate the influx of students.

On 16 March 2000, boundaries were created for the locality of Keith. These align with those of the cadastral unit of the Hundred of Stirling and include the town of Keith.

== Today ==
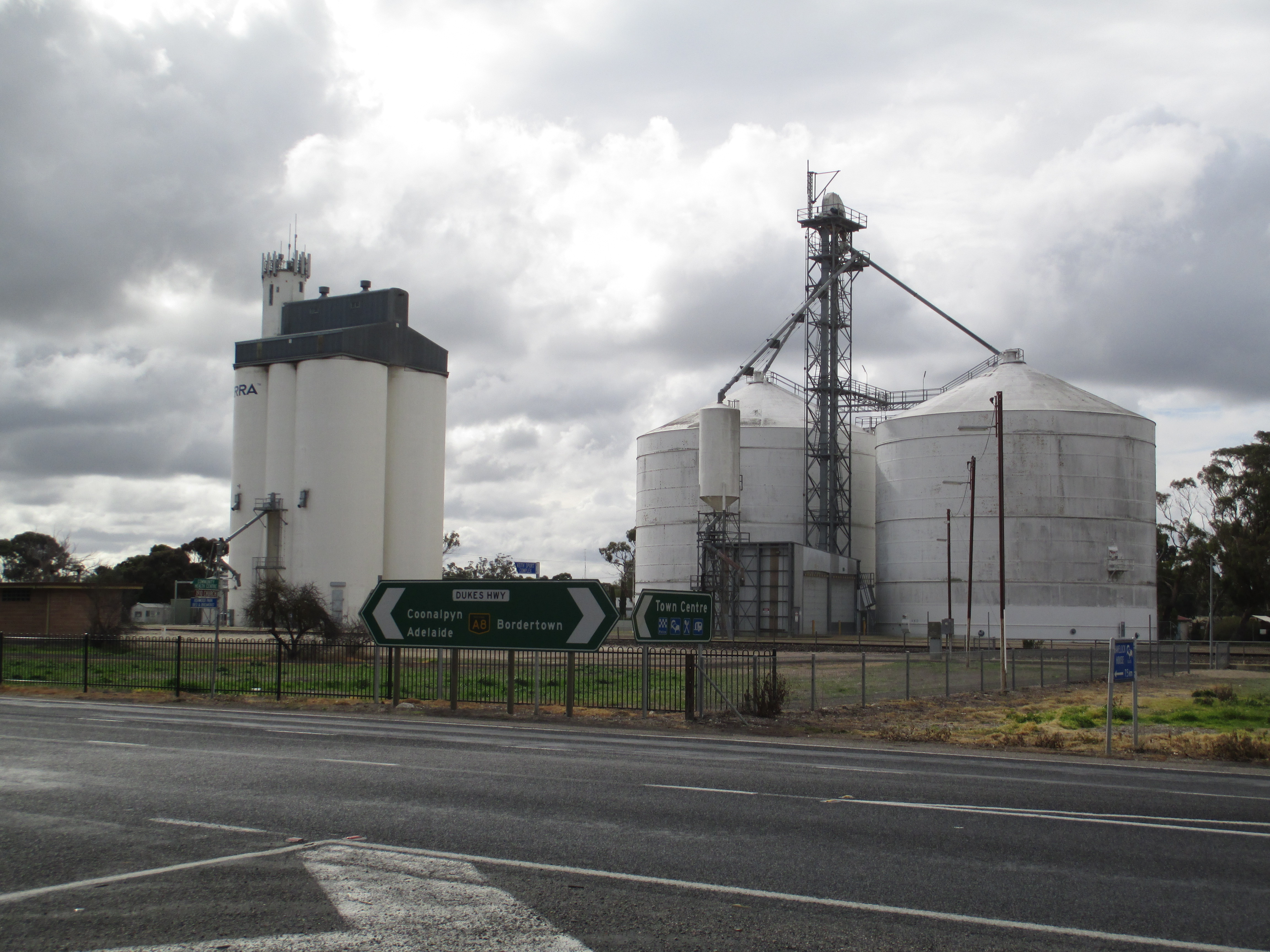
Grain silos by the railway at Keith

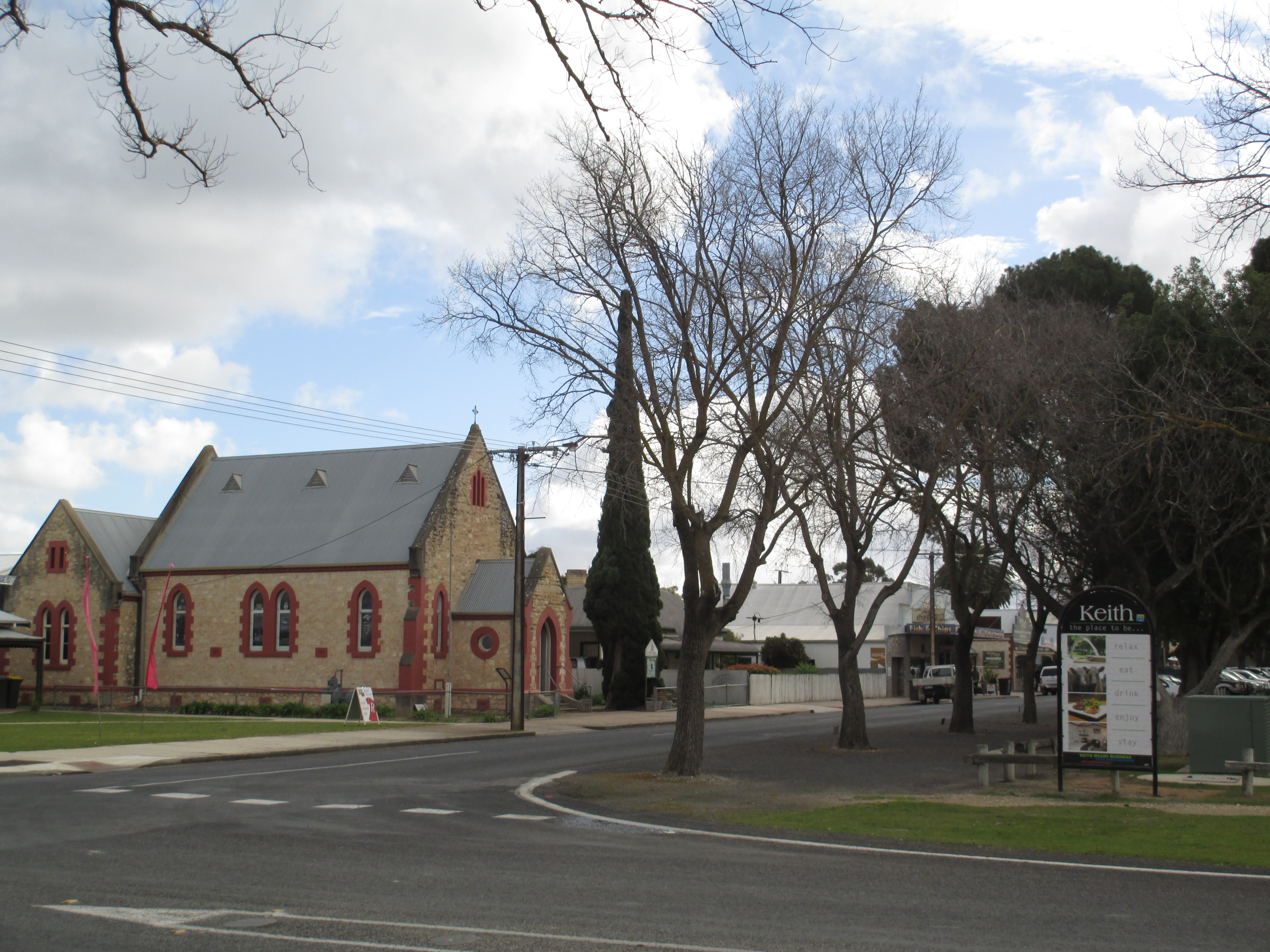
Former church building, now the National Trust museum

Several historical buildings still stand today, and many are still in use. The first school building built in the township is still in use by the school. The 1910 church with contemporary lead light windows inspired by local history is a common tourist attraction.

Local artist James Darling designed the local water feature, which celebrates the cycle of water through the Australian landscape and the region's widespread water irrigation.

The local industry is predominantly grain production and livestock grazing. More recently, olive production has been gaining momentum around the area, with a large processing plant opening recently.

The Catholic Church in the suburb is dedicated to Saint James.

The town slogan is "You're in the good country now"; it can be found on stubby holders and fridge magnets at the town's main roadhouse.

The town has an Australian rules football team competing in the Kowree-Naracoorte-Tatiara Football League.

== Governance ==
Keith is in the Tatiara District Council, the state electoral district of MacKillop and the federal division of Barker.

== Notable residents ==
- Chris Bailey – Rock musician
- Andy Caldecott – Professional motorcycle rider who won four Australian Safari races, and competed in the Paris Dakar Rally in 2004 (DNF) and was placed 6th in the 2005 race. He died from a severe neck injury during the ninth stage of the Paris Dakar Rally in 2006.
- Simon Cox – Professional Australian rules footballer, who played AFL for the Hawthorn Hawks and Western Bulldogs.
- James Darling – Artist
- Jack Redden – Professional AFL player for the West Coast Eagles
- Les Densley (14 Sep 1894 – 14 Nov 1974) – Pioneering farmer of the Keith district and Member of the Legislative Council of South Australia from 1944 to 1967

== Climate ==
Keith has a Mediterranean climate with cool, damp winters and warm to hot, dry summers. In the months of January and February 2014, Keith broke its record high temperature on two occasions, recording 46.0 °C on 14 January and 46.5 °C on 2 February, breaking the previous record by 0.5 °C and 1 °C respectively. On 20 December 2019 a maximum temperature of 49.2 °C was recorded.

Climate data for Keith, elevation 29 m (95 ft), (1991–2020 normals, extremes 1947–present)
| Month | Jan | Feb | Mar | Apr | May | Jun | Jul | Aug | Sep | Oct | Nov | Dec | Year |
|---|---|---|---|---|---|---|---|---|---|---|---|---|---|
| Record high °C (°F) | 46.0 (114.8) | 46.5 (115.7) | 42.4 (108.3) | 37.6 (99.7) | 30.8 (87.4) | 25.3 (77.5) | 26.2 (79.2) | 29.2 (84.6) | 36.1 (97.0) | 39.2 (102.6) | 45.0 (113.0) | 47.8 (118.0) | 47.8 (118.0) |
| Mean daily maximum °C (°F) | 30.5 (86.9) | 30.0 (86.0) | 26.8 (80.2) | 22.8 (73.0) | 18.5 (65.3) | 15.7 (60.3) | 15.2 (59.4) | 16.3 (61.3) | 18.7 (65.7) | 22.2 (72.0) | 25.6 (78.1) | 27.9 (82.2) | 22.5 (72.5) |
| Mean daily minimum °C (°F) | 13.7 (56.7) | 13.5 (56.3) | 11.5 (52.7) | 9.3 (48.7) | 7.8 (46.0) | 6.0 (42.8) | 5.8 (42.4) | 5.9 (42.6) | 7.1 (44.8) | 8.3 (46.9) | 10.4 (50.7) | 12.2 (54.0) | 9.3 (48.7) |
| Record low °C (°F) | 4.3 (39.7) | 4.3 (39.7) | 2.3 (36.1) | −1.2 (29.8) | −2.3 (27.9) | −4.3 (24.3) | −2.9 (26.8) | −3.8 (25.2) | −1.7 (28.9) | −1.7 (28.9) | 0.5 (32.9) | 2.7 (36.9) | −4.3 (24.3) |
| Average precipitation mm (inches) | 21.8 (0.86) | 16.5 (0.65) | 17.6 (0.69) | 27.5 (1.08) | 43.3 (1.70) | 52.8 (2.08) | 57.0 (2.24) | 57.4 (2.26) | 48.4 (1.91) | 31.0 (1.22) | 30.5 (1.20) | 28.5 (1.12) | 432.4 (17.02) |
| Average precipitation days (≥ 0.2 mm) | 5.1 | 4.1 | 5.6 | 7.8 | 12.6 | 14.1 | 15.7 | 16.1 | 14.3 | 10.0 | 7.7 | 6.8 | 119.9 |
| Average afternoon relative humidity (%) | 34 | 34 | 38 | 44 | 57 | 65 | 64 | 57 | 56 | 46 | 38 | 35 | 47 |
Source: Australian Bureau of Meteorology
