= Little Desert National Park =

National park in Victoria, Australia

- IUCN category II (national park)
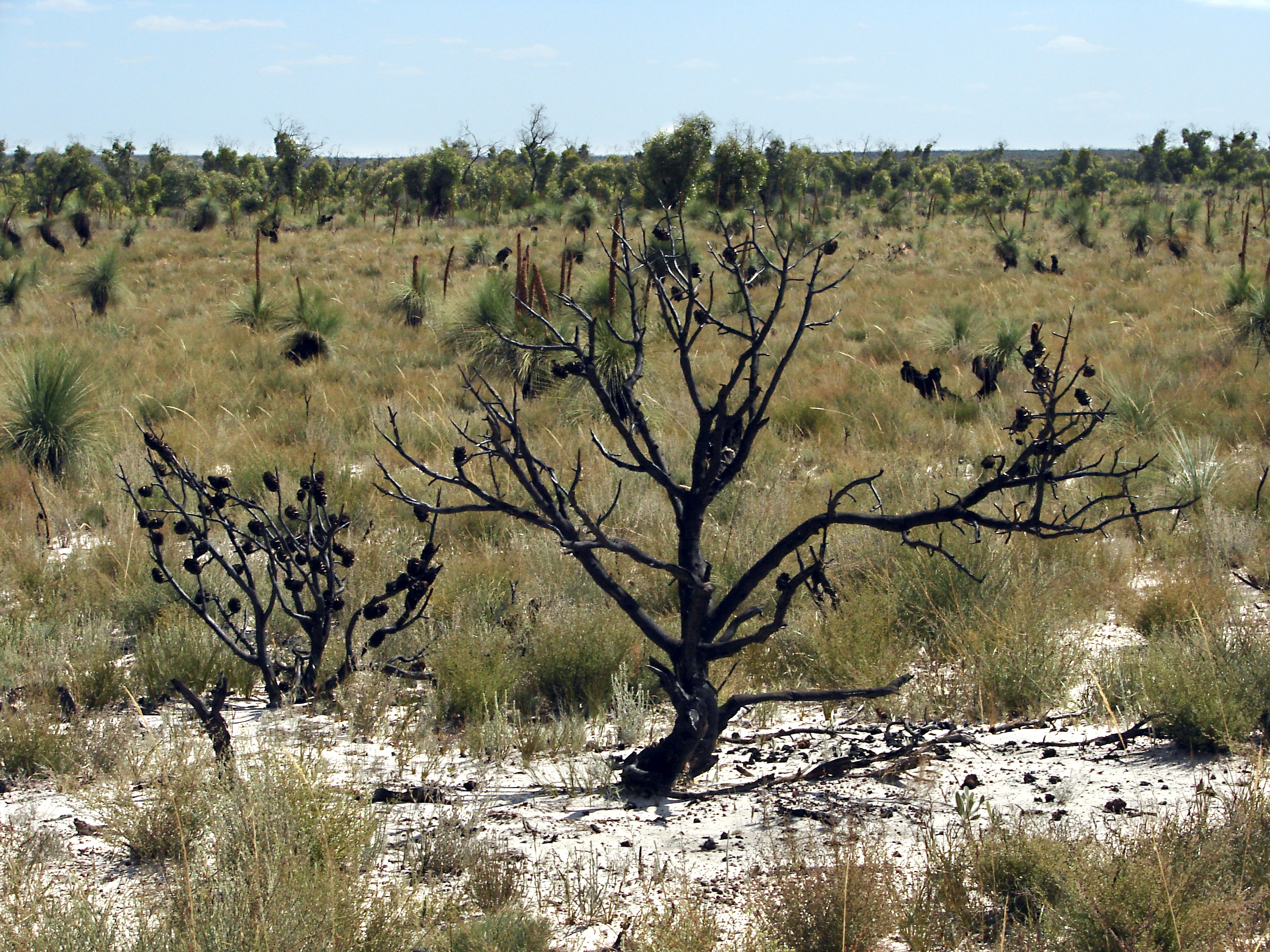

- Location within Victoria
- Location: Victoria
- Nearest city: Dimboola
- Coordinates: 36°36′24″S 141°11′19″E
- Area: 1,326.47 km^{2} (512.15 sq mi)
- Established: 1988
- Governing body: Parks Victoria
- Website: Official website

The Little Desert National Park is a national park in the Wimmera Mallee region of Victoria, Australia. The 132,647-hectare (327,780-acre) national park is situated near Dimboola, approximately 375 kilometres (233 mi) west of Melbourne and extends from the Wimmera River in the east to the South Australian border in the west near Naracoorte.

While the region is surrounded by agricultural land, the area of the Little Desert itself "consists mainly of deep sandy soils with very low fertility, interspersed with small pockets of clay soils. There are occasional rocky, sandstone outcrops and buckshot rises. Average yearly rainfall varies remarkably from the east to the west." The Little Desert "remains relatively undisturbed by human activity, even though in the earlier years of European settlement it experienced some industry in the way of grazing and woodcutting." Now the desert is a National Park, and is "broken up into three blocks": Western Block, Central Block and Eastern Block; demarcated by two north–south roads, the Nhill-Harrow road and the Kaniva-Edenhope road.

Today the National Park is an important tourist destination receiving about 50,000 visitors each year. Parks Victoria maintain multiple camping sites, walking tracks, look-outs and four-wheel-driving tracks throughout the park. Although most internal roads within the National Park are only accessible by four-wheel-drive vehicles and some are closed during winter or after wet weather.

== History ==
=== Pre-National Park ===
Prior to the establishment of the park, small Aboriginal family groups camped along the Wimmera River. European activity began with grazing from the 1840s but had ceased by the 1960s. During the Second World War the Central Block was used as a bombing and gunnery range and the remains of several concrete observation bunkers are still present.

=== National Park ===
The low-nutrient sandy soil combined with low rainfalls made farming difficult. After the Second World War, the State Government considered clearing and selling land in the Little Desert region. Local opposition to selling the land for farming was intense and quickly gathered support around Victoria. The Bolte Government was initially unmoved by environmental concerns. Public outrage over the proposed subdivision resulted in the responsible minister's losing his safe seat in a by-election. The Little Desert debate galvanised Victoria's conservation movement into forming a peak body, the Conservation Council of Victoria, and the conservative Victorian government of Henry Bolte to adopt environmental policies, such as establishing the Land Conservation Council to systematically and independently review all future public land use across the state. The architect of the Land Conservation Council was the newly appointed Minister of Lands, Conservation and Soldier Settlement, William Borthwick, who supported retaining the area as a nature reserve. So in 1955 the Kiata Lowan Sanctuary was established to preserve the 'Eastern block' of the Desert and protect the local Malleefowl. In 1969 this Sanctuary became 'The Little Desert National Park' in the 'Eastern Block' and in 1986 the 'Central' and 'Western' Blocks were added.

=== 2025 bushfire ===
On 27 January a fire was burning out of control in Little Desert National Park. Residents of nearby Dimboola were evacuated. More than 65,000 hectares (160,000 acres) were burnt in under 8 hours. On 31 January it was deemed contained after burning 70,887 hectares (175,170 acres). Little Desert Nature Lodge, a "popular wedding and conference centre" near the parks' boundary, was destroyed.

== Flora and fauna ==
The Little Desert receives an annual rainfall of approximately 480 millimetres (19 in), though there is a gradient from 400 millimetres (16 in) in the east to 600 millimetres (24 in) near Naracoorte. The vegetation of the park ranges from pure mallee heathland in the Eastern Block to cypress pine and casuarina woodlands in the moister Western Block. In the Western Block, there are large areas of seasonal swampland formed over claypans. Laterites are scattered throughout the sandy areas of the park and characterised by broombush. Brush-tailed possums and Grey kangaroos are common throughout the park, and lizards can be observed basking in the sun.

=== Birds ===
With over 200 species of birds the national park has been identified by BirdLife International, an international NGO, as an Important Bird Area because it supports populations of malleefowl and diamond firetails. The malleefowl is a rare bird found on the site and their protection was a contributory factor in the decision to preserve the area in 1968.

== See also ==
- Dimboola
- Edenhope
- Kaniva
- Protected areas of Victoria
- List of national parks of Australia
