= Peebinga =

Peebinga may refer to:

- Peebinga, South Australia, a town and locality and the site of a historic railway station.
- Peebinga Conservation Park, a protected area in South Australia
- Peebinga railway line, a railway line in South Australia
- Peebinga Important Bird Area, a designation associated with the Peebinga Conservation Park
- Hundred of Peebinga, a cadastral unit in South Australia
