= District Council of Loxton =

Local government area in Australia

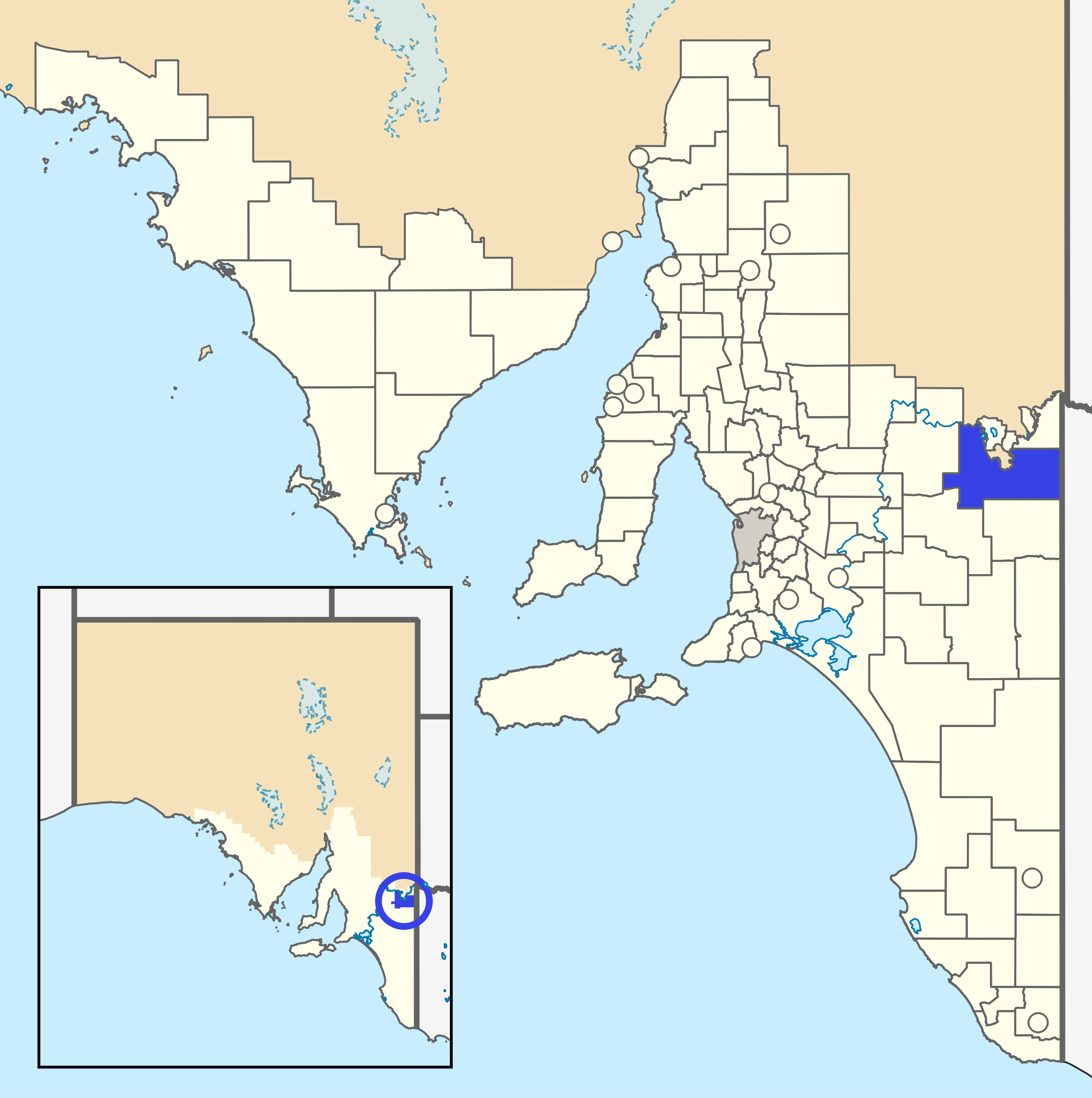
The District Council of Loxton as it was prior to disestablishment (blue)

The District Council of Loxton was a local government area in South Australia from 1910 to 1997, centring on the town of Loxton.

It was proclaimed on 12 May 1910, following the naming and settling of the town in 1907. The district included the whole of the cadastral hundreds of Murtho, Paringa, Gordon, Bookpurnong, Pyap and Moorook, as well as "that portion of county Alfred south of the hundreds of Bookpurnong and Pyap." It was divided into three wards at its inception (North, South and West), each electing three councillors. A subsequent redistribution of wards created a five-ward system (East, Central, Pyap, West and Town), with a sixth ward (Irrigation Ward) created in 1953 to represent an influx of soldier settlers to the irrigation settlement around Loxton North. This reflected the increasing importance of irrigation to the district, with farmers growing citrus, stone fruit and vines on what had formerly been agricultural land. In 1912, a permanent council chamber and library were added to the Loxton Institute building. A new council chamber was built in 1938, but in the 1970s the Institute building was converted into new council chambers. The council undertook a wide range of responsibilities: it was involved in land development for some years, operated the Loxton Hospital from 1925 to 1964 and opened a public library in 1982.

In 1923, the council covered an area of 666,880 acres, with a population of 2,811 residing in 277 dwellings, with the capital value of ratable property being £900,680. By 1936, the population had increased to 4,580, living in 900 dwellings, and a capital value of £1,657,928. This had increased to 7,100 by 1984. In 1986, it was responsible for an area of 2804 square kilometres, including the townships of Loxton, Kingston-on-Murray, Moorook, Nadda, New Residence, Pata, Pyap, Taldra, Taplan and Wunkar. In that year, the primary industries were reported as being the growing of cereals, the production of lamb, beef and pig meats and the growing of citrus, grapes and stone fruits in the irrigated areas.

The council ceased to exist on 3 May 1997, when it amalgamated with the District Council of Brown's Well and the District Council of Waikerie to form the District Council of Loxton Waikerie. The new council continued to operate out of the offices of the former District Council of Loxton.

== Chairmen and mayors of the District Council of Loxton ==
- Adolph Wilhelm Robert Drabsch (1910–1916)
- Francis John Petch (1926–1946)
- Charles Earl Murday Tonkin (1946–1952)
- John Leonard Wetherall (1952–1955)
- Roy Vernon Glatz (1955–1961)
- Alfred Bruce Busbridge (1961–1964)
- Otto Wilfred Kaesler (1964–1969)
- Roy Vernon Glatz (1972–1974)
- Leatrice Shirley Pfitzner (1974–1977)
