= Billiatt =

Billiatt may refer to:

- Billiatt, South Australia, a locality in the Murray Mallee region
- Billiatt Conservation Park, protected area in South Australia
- Billiatt National Park, the former name of the Billiatt Conservation Park
- Billiatt Wilderness Protection Area, protected area in South Australia
- Hundred of Billiatt, one of the cadastral divisions of South Australia

== See also ==
- Billiat, a commune in France
