= Cameron Highway =

Road in South Australia

Cameron Highway Alawoona-Paruna Road South Australia
- Coordinates: 34.735817°S 140.514967°E (West end); 34.720168°S 140.733942°E (East end)

General information
- Type: Highway
- Length: 20.4 km (13 mi)
- Gazetted: 2008

Major junctions
- West end: Karoonda Highway; Alawoona, South Australia
- East end: Browns Well Highway; Paruna, South Australia

Location(s)
- Region: Murray and Mallee

Highway system
- Highways in Australia; National Highway • Freeways in Australia; Highways in South Australia

Cameron Highway is an arterial road in South Australia, connecting Alawoona on the Karoonda Highway to Paruna on the Browns Well Highway. It follows part of the former Barmera railway line.

The Cameron Highway was named around 2008 after either Archie Cameron (a local state and Federal politician who reached the level of Deputy Prime Minister of Australia) or Alex Cameron who had been Chairman of the District Council of Brown's Well from 1919 to 1939.

== Major junctions ==
Cameron Highway is entirely contained within the District Council of Loxton Waikerie local government area.

| Location | km | mi | Destinations | Notes |
|---|---|---|---|---|
| Alawoona | 0 | 0.0 | Karoonda Highway (B55) – Karoonda, Loxton | Western end of highway |
| Paruna | 21 | 13 | Browns Well Highway (B57) – Loxton, Pinnaroo | Eastern end of highway |
Route transition
