= Meribah, South Australia =

Small settlement in the far east of South Australia

Meribah South Australia
- Coordinates: 34°42′S 140°51′E
- Population: 39 (SAL 2021)
- Postcode(s): 5311
- Elevation: 36 m (118 ft)
- LGA(s): District Council of Loxton Waikerie
- State electorate(s): Electoral district of Chaffey
- Federal division(s): Division of Barker
Localities around Meribah:
Woodleigh	Taplan
Paruna	Meribah	Murray-Sunset
Kringin	Peebinga

Meribah is a small settlement in the Brown's Well district of the Murray Mallee region of South Australia. It is 10 kilometres (6 miles) from the border with Victoria, 62 kilometres (39 miles) north of Pinnaroo, and 37 kilometres (23 miles) south-east of Loxton.

The township was a short-lived terminus of the Barmera railway line in 1913 until construction extended to Paringa later in the year.

The town was proclaimed on 26 November 1914; it was named after a nearby bore styled Meribah, the biblical place where Moses "struck the rock and water gushed forth".

The post office opened in March 1916 and closed in June 1985.
