= Pimelea williamsonii =

Scientific classification
- Kingdom: Plantae
- Clade: Tracheophytes
- Clade: Angiosperms
- Clade: Eudicots
- Clade: Rosids
- Order: Malvales
- Family: Thymelaeaceae
- Genus: Pimelea
- Species: P. williamsonii

Binomial name
- Pimelea williamsonii J.M.Black

Species of shrub

Pimelea williamsonii, commonly known as Williamson's rice-flower, is a species of flowering plant in the family Thymelaeaceae and is endemic to the southern continental Australia. It is a bushy annual subshrub with more or less elliptic leaves and elongated heads of many hairy, brownish flowers.

== Description ==
Pimelea williamsonii is a bushy annual subshrub that typically grows to a height of 10–30 cm (3.9–11.8 in) and has densely hairy young stems. The leaves are more or less elliptic, 7–15 mm (0.28–0.59 in) long and 2–4 mm (0.079–0.157 in) wide on a short petiole. The flowers are bisexual, arranged on the ends of branches in elongated heads up to 65 mm (2.6 in) long. Each flower is on a hairy pedicel, the flower tube about 3 mm (0.12 in) long, the sepals about 1 mm (0.039 in) long, the flowers brownish and covered with short white and long brown hairs. Flowering occurs in most months with a peak in October and November.

== Taxonomy ==
Pimelea williamsonii was first formally described in 1919 by John McConnell Black in the Transactions and Proceedings of the Royal Society of South Australia. The specific epithet (williamsonii) honours Herbert Bennett Williamson who discovered the species near Pinnaroo in 1917.

== Distribution and habitat ==
Williamson's rice-flower grows in sand from the Eyre Peninsula and Billiatt Conservation Park in south-eastern South Australia to Annuello and Hattah-Kulkyne National Park in north-western Victoria.
