= Billiatt, South Australia =

Locality in South Australia

Billiatt South Australia
- Coordinates: 34°55′52″S 140°34′03″E
- Population: 0 (SAL 2016)
- Established: 28 September 2000
- Postcode(s): 5311
- Time zone: ACST (UTC+9:30)
  - Summer (DST): ACST (UTC+10:30)
- Location: 168 km (104 mi) north-east of Adelaide city centre; 52 km (32 mi) south of Loxton
- LGA(s): District Council of Loxton Waikerie
- Region: Murray and Mallee
- County: Chandos
- State electorate(s): Chaffey
- Federal division(s): Barker
| Mean max temp | Mean min temp | Annual rainfall |
| 23.6 °C; 74 °F | 8.7 °C; 48 °F | 268.7 mm 10.6 in |
Suburbs around Billiatt:
| Schell Well | Schell Well; Malpas; Kringin | Kringin |
| Sandalwood | Billiatt | Kringin |
| Sandalwood | Lameroo | Karte |
- Footnotes: Locations; Adjoining localities

Billiatt is a locality in the Australian state of South Australia located in the south-east of the state in the Murray Mallee region about 168 kilometres (104 miles) north-east of the state capital of Adelaide.

Its boundaries were created on 28 September 2000 for the "long established local name". Its name is derived from the Billiatt Conservation Park and the cadastral unit of the Hundred of Billiatt.

The principal land use within the locality is conservation with the majority of its land area being occupied by the Billiatt Wilderness Protection Area.

Billiatt is located within the federal Division of Barker and the state electoral district of Chaffey and the local government area of the District Council of Loxton Waikerie.
