= District Council of Brown's Well =

Former local government area in South Australia

Coordinates: 34°44′12″S 140°30′23″E

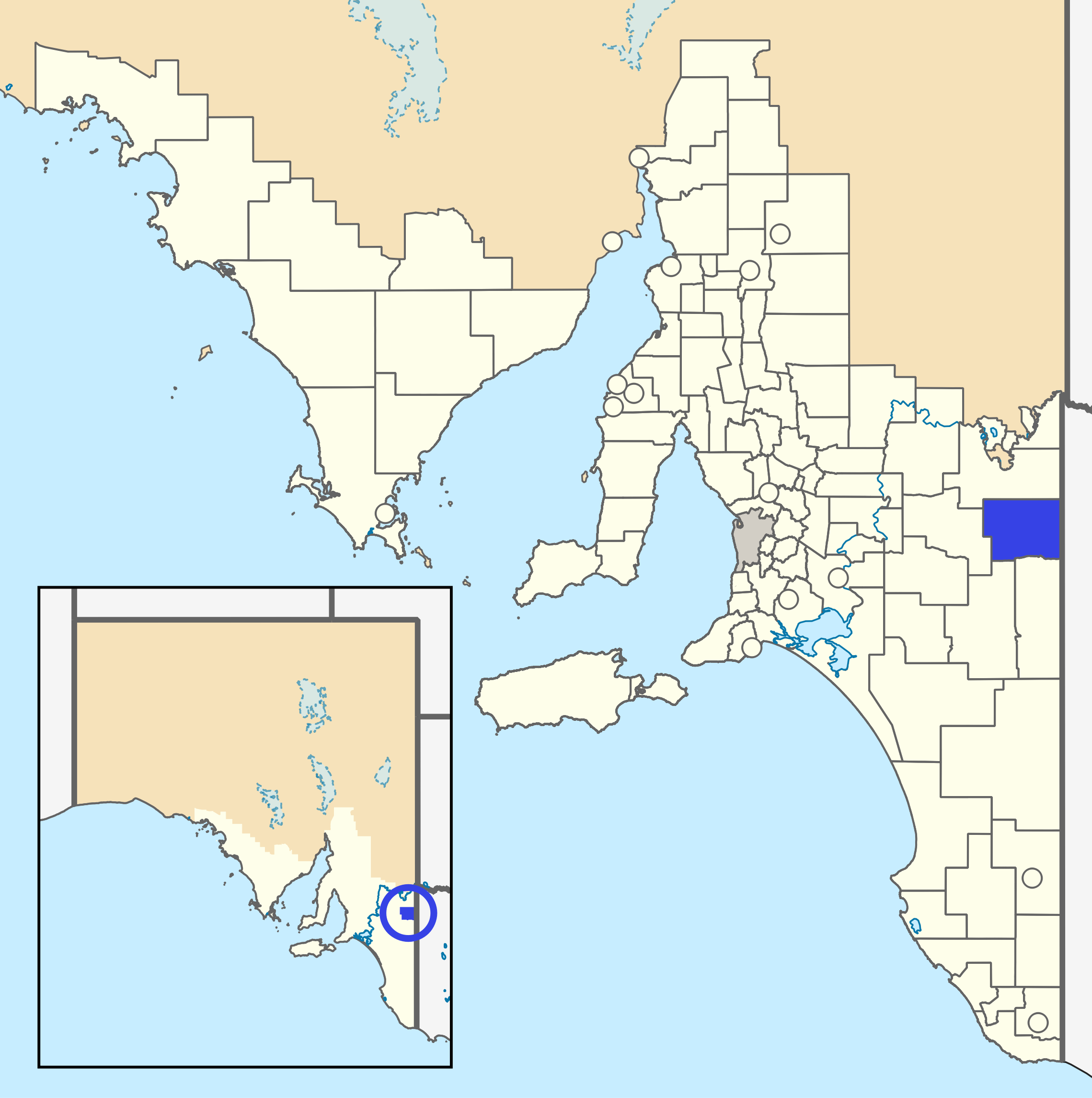
The District Council of Brown's Well as it was prior to disestablishment (blue)

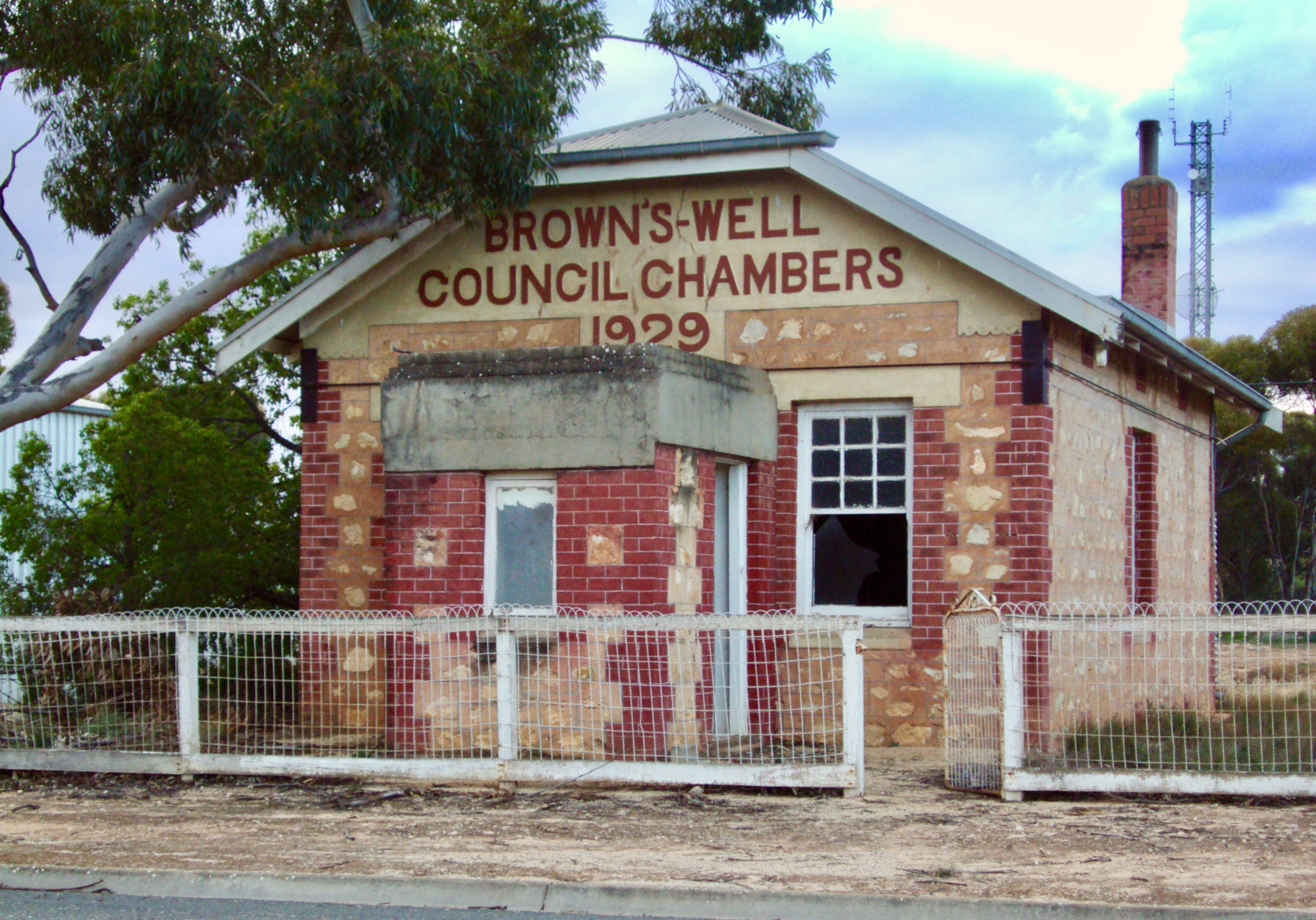
Former Brown's Well Council Chambers

The District Council of Brown's Well was a local government area in South Australia from 1916 to 1997. The name stemmed from the Brown's Well pastoral station, which was located near the council seat of Paruna. Meetings were also held on a regular basis in the institute at Alawoona, which was the district's major centre.

It was proclaimed on 16 November 1916, and held its first meeting on 16 December. The area had formerly been part of the District Council of Loxton. The first council chamber was a ten by ten shed and it was reported that there were "no roads and very few grubbed tracks" and "the population of the entire district [was] very small."

A permanent council chambers building was opened in May 1929. In 1935, the council had a total population of 1,100, with 85 miles of main roads and 409 miles of district roads. In 1936, it comprised the cadastral hundreds of Allen, Kekwick and McGorrery, with a total land area of 340,800 acres, having increased since the initial proclamation. The main towns were Paruna, Alawoona, Cobera (now incorporated into Alawoona), Malpas, Meribah and Veitch. It was divided into six wards: North-East, South-East, North, South, South-West and North-West.

Much of the area was isolated Mallee country that was still being opened up in the 1930s. In 1932, it was reported that the council's road-building works were sufficiently large that there was "not a single man in the whole of the area who was unemployed."

The council ceased to exist on 3 May 1997, when it amalgamated with the District Council of Loxton and the District Council of Waikerie to form the District Council of Loxton Waikerie.

The Brown's Well council's former honour board was re-unveiled in the Loxton council offices in March 2016, following calls for its reinstatement from a former Brown's Well councillor.

== Chairmen of the District Council of Brown's Well ==
- Cecil Stone (1916–1917)
- L. V. Shannon (1917–1919)
- Alex Cameron (1919–1939)
- John Joseph Elwood (1939–1940)
- Arthur Alan Petch (1940–1944)
- Eric Milton Edwards (1944–1949)
- Albert Wyndham Broad (1949–1951)
- Eric Milton Edwards (1951–1952)
- Albert Wyndham Broad (1952–1954)
- William Westley Claude Tiller (1954–1958)
- Victor Norman Henschke (1958–1962)
- Thomas Allen Nance (1962–1963)
- Victor Norman Henschke (1963–1964)
- Norman John Flavel (1964–1967)
- Kenneth Griffiths (1967-after 1985)
