= Veitch, South Australia =

Veitch South Australia
- Coordinates: 34.6579°S 140.5117°E
- Population: 16 (SAL 2021)
- Location: 25 km (16 mi) south of Loxton; 10 km (6 mi) north of Alawoona
- LGA(s): District Council of Loxton Waikerie
- State electorate(s): Chaffey
- Federal division(s): Barker
Localities around Veitch:
Pyap West	Pata
Caliph	Veitch
	Alawoona	Malpas

Veitch is a settlement in the Murray Mallee region of South Australia. It is on the Loxton railway line and Karoonda Highway about 25 kilometres (16 mi) south of Loxton.

== History ==
Veitch was named after Mr Veitch, who sunk wells in the area around 1882. The town was surveyed in 1916.
