= County of Alfred =

Alfred
- Cadastral division
- Coordinates: 34.528°S 140.697°E
- Country: Australia
- State: South Australia
- LGA(s): Loxton Waikerie
- Established: 1868

Area
  - Total: 3,890 km^{2} (1,502 sq mi)
Lands administrative divisions around Alfred
Young	Hamley	Tara (NSW)
Albert	Alfred	Millewa (Vic)
Buccleuch	Chandos	Weeah (Vic)

The County of Alfred is one of the 49 cadastral counties of South Australia on the south banks of the River Murray. It was proclaimed by Governor James Fergusson in 1868 and named for Prince Alfred, second son of Queen Victoria, who visited the state in 1867.

The entirety of the county, along with the Hundred of Moorook in the adjacent County of Albert, was proclaimed as the District Council of Loxton in 1910. In 1916 the hundreds of Paringa and Murtho seceded from Loxton's north to form the new District Council of Paringa, and the hundreds of Allen, Kekwick and McGorrery seceded from the south to form the new District Council of Brown's Well. Paringa and Murtho became part of a larger council—the Renmark Paringa Council—when Paringa council amalgamated with Renmark town in 1996. When Loxton council re-amalgamated with Brown's Well and Waikerie in 1997, the remaining southern bulk of the county became part of the larger District Council of Loxton Waikerie.

== Hundreds ==
The county is divided into eight hundreds: from west to east on the south bank of the Murray are the hundreds of Murtho, Paringa, Gordon, Bookpurnong and Pyap. In the south of the county from east to west are the hundreds of Allen, Kekwick and McGorrery.

== See also ==
- Lands administrative divisions of South Australia
