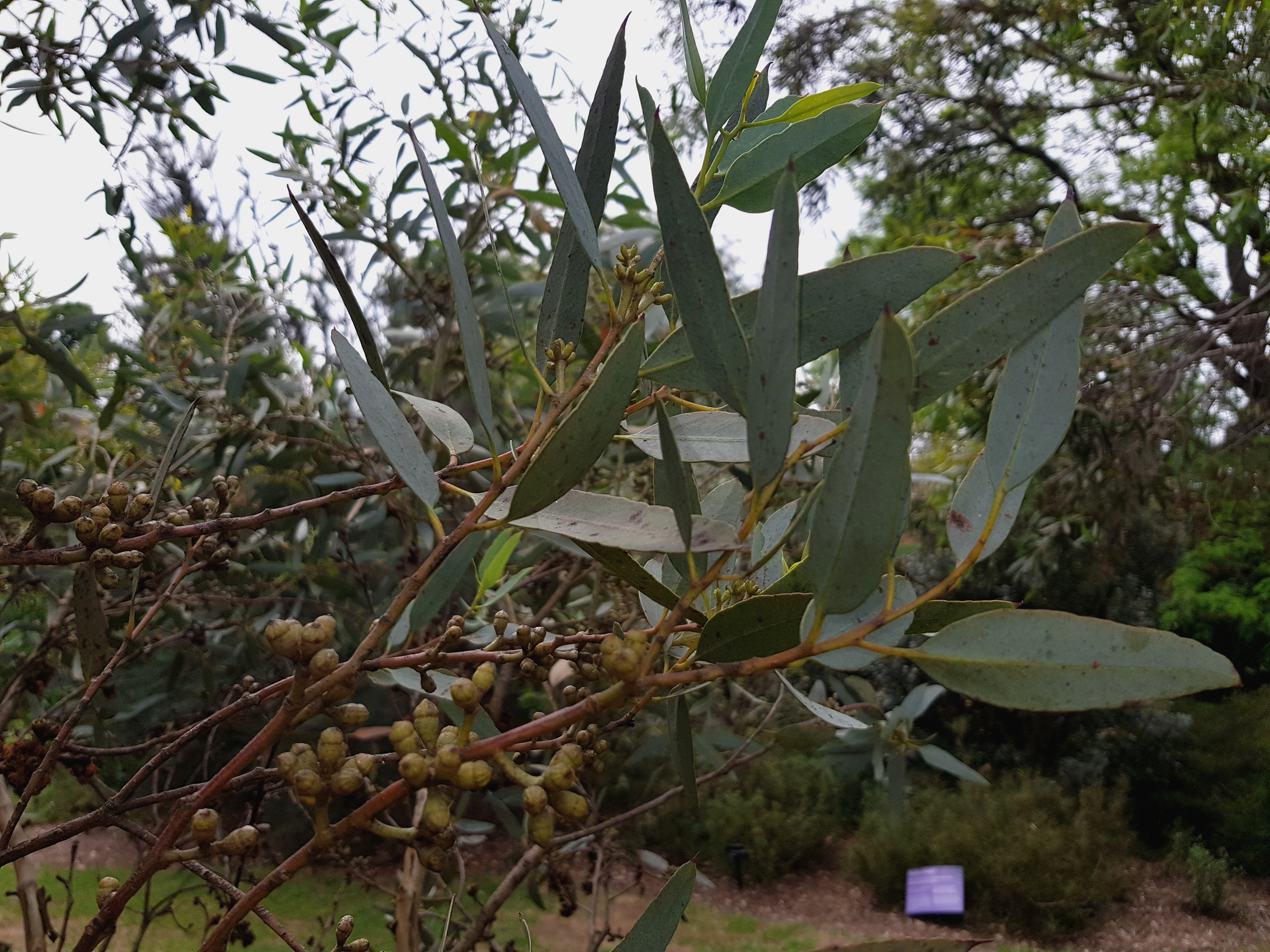
- Eucalyptus cyanophylla foliage and fruit in Royal Botanic Gardens Victoria

Conservation status
- Vulnerable (IUCN 3.1)

Scientific classification
- Kingdom: Plantae
- Clade: Tracheophytes
- Clade: Angiosperms
- Clade: Eudicots
- Clade: Rosids
- Order: Myrtales
- Family: Myrtaceae
- Genus: Eucalyptus
- Species: E. cyanophylla

Binomial name
- Eucalyptus cyanophylla Brooker

= Eucalyptus cyanophylla =

Murraylands mallee

Species of eucalyptus

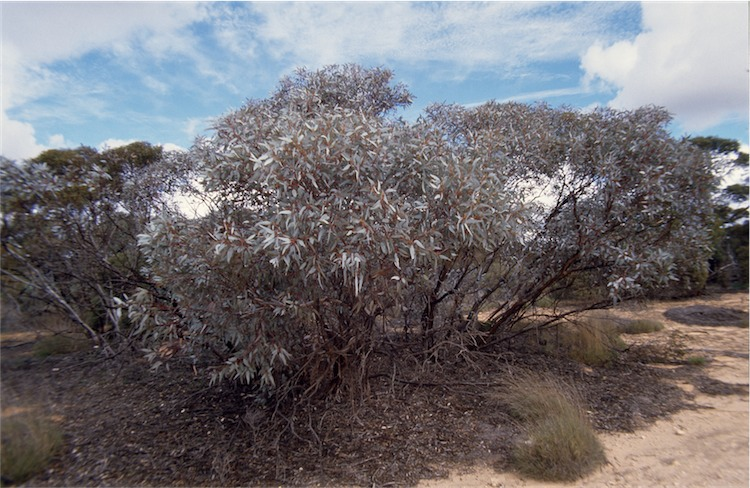
Eucalyptus cyanophylla growing near Allawoona, South Australia

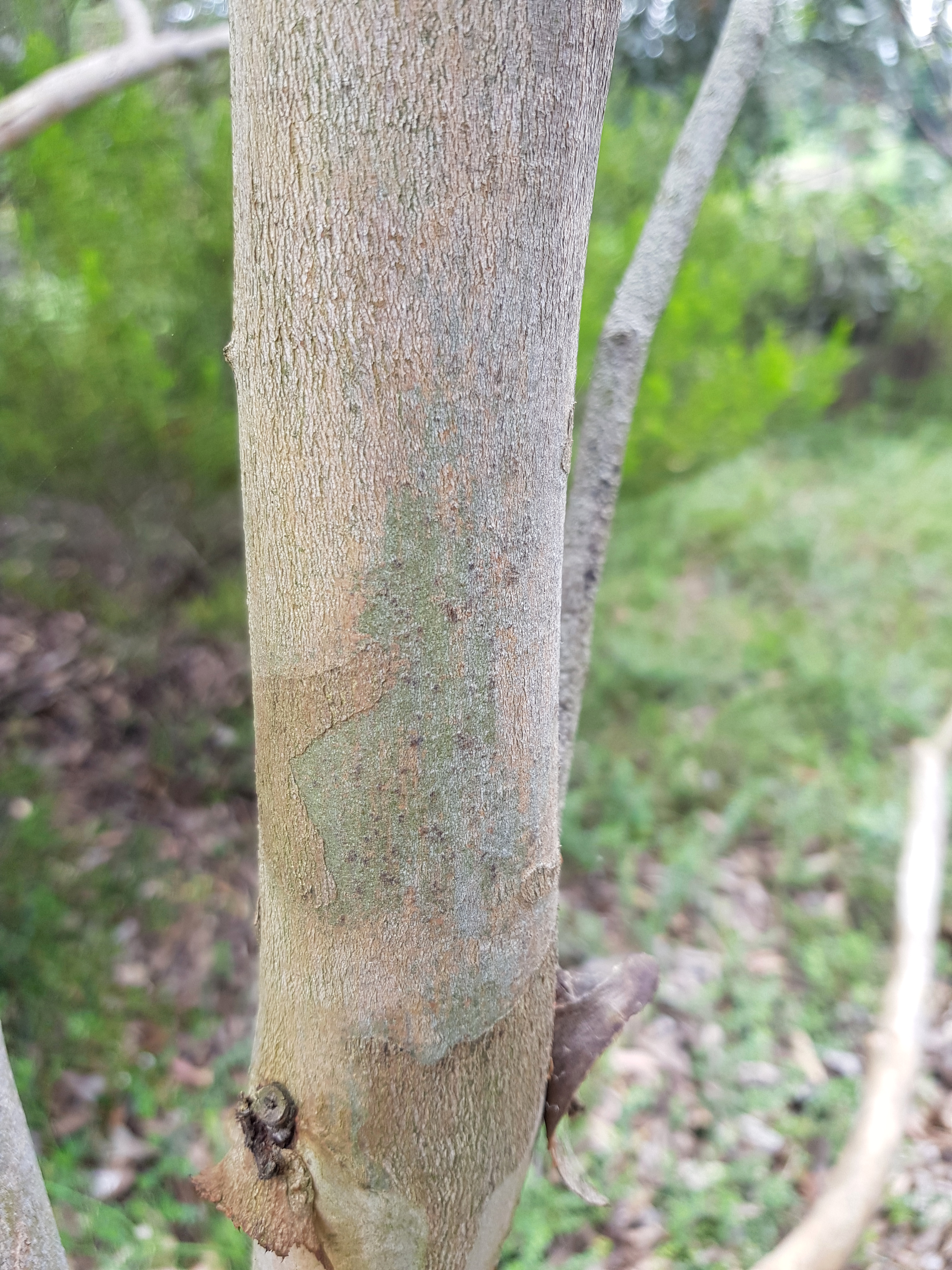
Bark of Eucalyptus cyanophylla.

Eucalyptus cyanophylla, commonly known as the Murraylands mallee, blue-leaved mallee or ghost mallee, is a species of mallee that is endemic to southern Australia. It has mostly smooth bark, greyish blue, lance-shaped or curved adult leaves, flower buds in groups of seven, white flowers and conical, cup-shaped or barrel-shaped fruit.

== Description ==
Eucalyptus cyanophylla is a mallee that typically grows to a height of 5–6 m (16–20 ft) and forms a lignotuber. It has pinkish brown or white to orange bark, often with rough, fibrous grey or reddish bark on the lower trunk. Young plants and coppice regrowth have thick, greyish blue, elliptic to broadly egg-shaped leaves that are 60–120 mm (2.4–4.7 in) long and 25–70 mm (0.98–2.76 in) wide. Adult leaves are lance-shaped or curved, the same dull bluish grey on both sides, 70–160 mm (2.8–6.3 in) long and 17–35 mm (0.67–1.38 in) wide on a petiole 15–27 mm (0.59–1.06 in) long. The flower buds are arranged in leaf axils on an unbranched peduncle 5–13 mm (0.20–0.51 in) long, the individual buds sessile or on a pedicel up to 3 mm (0.12 in) long. Mature flower buds are oblong, 7–13 mm (0.28–0.51 in) long and 5–8 mm (0.20–0.31 in) wide with a rounded or conical operculum. Flowering occurs between August and October and the flowers are white. The fruit is a woody conical, cup-shaped or barrel-shaped capsule 6–10 mm (0.24–0.39 in) long and 7–10 mm (0.28–0.39 in) wide with the valves close to rim level.

== Taxonomy and naming ==
Eucalyptus cyanophylla was first formally described in 1977 by Ian Brooker from a specimen collected near Berri by Bruce Copley. The description was published in Transactions of the Royal Society of South Australia. The specific epithet (cyanophylla) is derived from the Ancient Greek words kyanos meaning "dark blue" and phyllon meaning "leaf" referring to the colour of the leaves.

== Distribution and habitat ==
Blue-leaved mallee grows in sandy soil, usually over limestone, in open shrubland. It is mainly found between Waikerie, Renmark and Alawoona in South Australia and in northwestern Victoria.

== See also ==
- List of Eucalyptus species
