= Taplan, South Australia =

Taplan South Australia
- Coordinates: 34°32′S 140°52′E
- Population: 114 (2011)
- Postcode(s): 5333
- Elevation: 68 m (223 ft)
- Time zone: ACST (UTC+9:30)
  - Summer (DST): ACDT (UTC+10:30)
- Location: 260 km (162 mi) east of Adelaide
- LGA(s): District Council of Loxton Waikerie
- State electorate(s): Chaffey
- Federal division(s): Barker
Localities around Taplan:
Bugle Hut	Taldra
Woodleigh	Taplan	Murray-Sunset
Paruna	Meribah

Taplan (postcode 5333) is a town in the Murray Mallee region of South Australia near the border with Victoria. Taplan is an Aboriginal word meaning grass tree. The town was laid out by Henry George in 1914. The railway from Adelaide to Paringa was laid past the site of the future township in 1913, 183.25 miles (294.91 km) by rail from Adelaide. The Taplan Post Office was open from 1 July 1914 to 14 May 1982.

== Nadda ==
The next railway siding south of Taplan was named Nadda (34.61°S 140.89°E). It is now "incorporated into the bounded locality of Taplin" (sic). The name was proposed to be changed to Nalyilta (an Aboriginal name for a bough shelter) in 1916, but if it changed, it was changed back soon after. A school opened at Nadda in 1924 and closed in 1962. A postal receiving office opened at Nadda on 2 January 1914, became a post office around 1916, and closed on 13 June 1974.
