= Karara and Lochada Important Bird Area =

Important Bird Area in Western Australia

Coordinates: 29°08′14″S 116°43′33″E

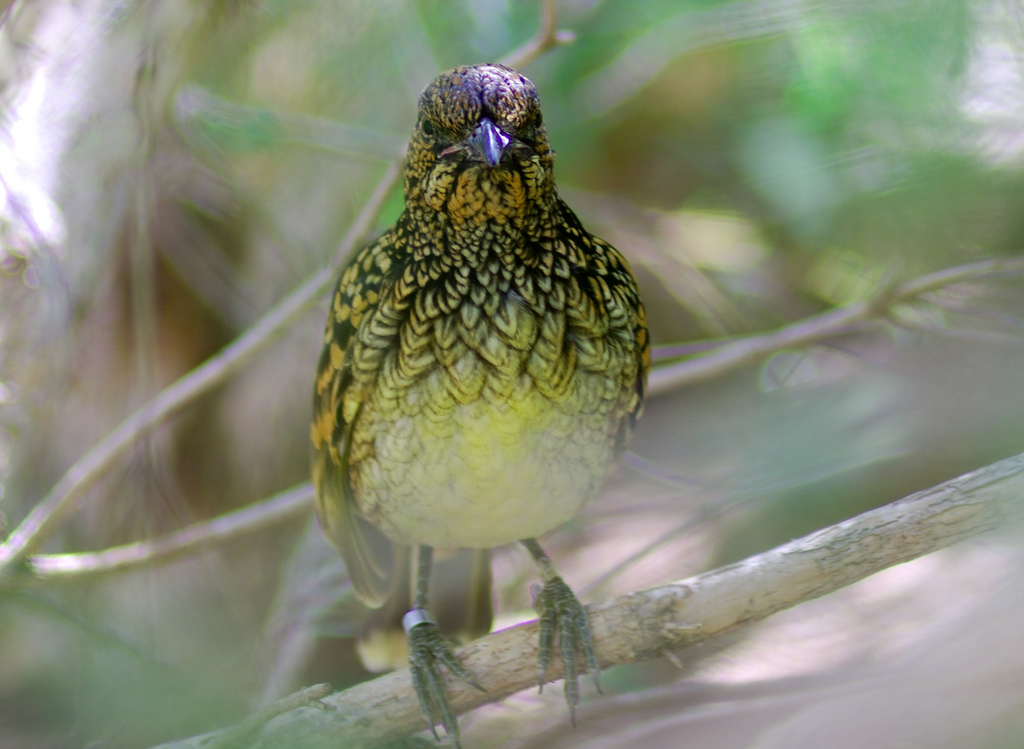
The IBA is an important site for western bowerbirds

The Karara and Lochada Important Bird Area is a 2404 km^{2} tract of land in the Mid West region of Western Australia, about 30 km east of the town of Morawa and 320 km north-east of Perth.

== Description ==
The Important Bird Area (IBA) incorporates the former pastoral properties of Karara and Lochada, with small areas of adjacent land. It contains large areas of Acacia shrubland with some open eucalypt woodland. It lies at an altitude of 280–400 m above sea level in pastoral country adjacent to the wheatbelt. Its average annual rainfall of about 300 mm is highly variable and falls mainly in winter.

== Birds ==
The site has been identified by BirdLife International as an IBA because it supports populations of the vulnerable malleefowl and the restricted-range western corella, as well as of Bourke's and regent parrots, western bowerbirds, rufous treecreepers, black honeyeaters, slaty-backed thornbills, chiming wedgebills, chestnut-breasted quail-thrushes and western yellow robins.
