= Woodleigh, South Australia =

Woodleigh South Australia
- Coordinates: 34.5682°S 140.71509°E
- Population: 62 (2016 census)
- Gazetted: 28 September 2000
- Postcode(s): 5311
- Elevation: 55 m (180 ft)
- Location: 20 km (12 mi) southeast of Loxton
- LGA(s): District Council of Loxton Waikerie
- State electorate(s): Chaffey
- Federal division(s): Barker
Mean max temp	Mean min temp	Annual rainfall
24.0 °C; 75 °F	9.1 °C; 48 °F	263.1 mm 10.4 in
Localities around Woodleigh:
Loxton	Bugle Hut	Taldra
Pata	Woodleigh	Taplan
Malpas	Paruna

Woodleigh is a locality in the Murray Mallee region of South Australia. It is southeast of Loxton along the Browns Well Highway and the Taplan Road. The terrain is predominantly flat, sandy soil cleared for cropping. The population is dispersed among farmhouses with no population centre in the district. Mean annual rainfall is 263.1 millimetres (10.36 in) falling on 78.9 days of the year. Woodleigh was never serviced directly by rail. The Loxton railway line was to the west and the Paringa railway line was to the east.

There was a hall at Woodleigh proposed as a Congregational hall to also be used as a community hall and school in 1912 on an acre of land donated by Mr J. Day. The hall had opened by the end of 1914 but was destroyed by fire on 16 October 1919. There was immediate enthusiasm to rebuild the hall.
