= Wandown Important Bird Area =

Important Bird Area in Victoria, Australia

Coordinates: 34°47′22″S 143°02′17″E

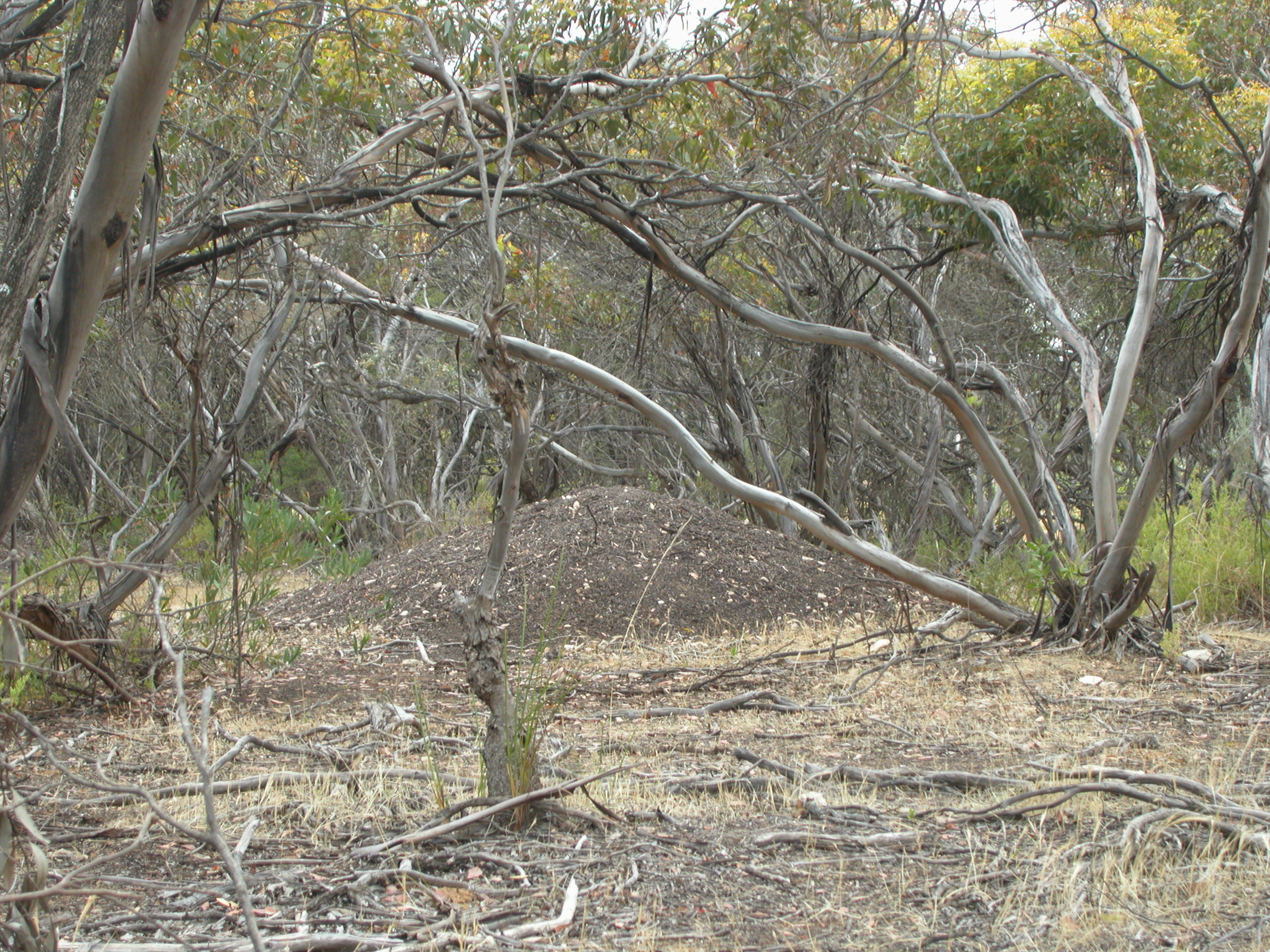
Mallefowl nesting-mound in mallee woodland

The Wandown Important Bird Area comprises a 48 km^{2} disjunct tract of remnant mallee habitat in northern Victoria, south-eastern Australia. It lies close to the junction of the Murray and Murrumbidgee Rivers, some 50 km south-east of the town of Robinvale and 75 km north-west of the city of Swan Hill.

== Description ==
The Important Bird Area (IBA) consists of three separate properties: Wandown Flora and Fauna Reserve, Menzies Nature Conservation Reserve, and the Boundary Bend property owned and managed by Trust For Nature. The vegetation is dominated by mallee woodland and shrubland communities with patches of semiarid non-eucalypt woodland on calcareous dunes with loamy or sandy soils. The northernmost section of Boundary Bend is dominated by lignum and other non-mallee communities. The area has a warm, dry climate with mean maximum temperatures ranging from 33 °C in January to 15.7 °C in July, and mean annual rainfall of 320 mm.

== Flora and fauna ==
Of the more than 200 species of plants recorded in the IBA, several are listed as threatened, including the yellow Swainson-pea. Mitchell's hopping mice and common brushtail possums are present.

=== Birds ===
The site has been identified as an IBA by BirdLife International because it supports a breeding population of malleefowl as well as foraging habitat for regent parrots. Other birds recorded in the IBA include striated grasswrens, shy heathwrens, black honeyeaters, flame robins, southern scrub-robins, chestnut quail-thrushes, chestnut-crowned babblers and black honeyeaters.
