= Billiatt Wilderness Protection Area =

Protected area in South Australia

- IUCN category Ib (wilderness area)
- Location within South Australia
- Location: South Australia, Billiatt, Lameroo and Sandalwood
- Nearest city: Alawoona
- Coordinates: 35°00′50″S 140°23′25″E
- Area: 591.25 km^{2} (228.28 sq mi)
- Established: 24 July 2008
- Governing body: Department for Environment and Water

Billiatt Wilderness Protection Area is a protected area located about 30 kilometres (19 miles) north of Lameroo in South Australia.

The wilderness protection area occupies in land in the gazetted localities of Billiatt, Lameroo and Sandalwood.

The wilderness protection area was proclaimed under the Wilderness Protection Act 1992 on 24 July 2008 on land excised from the Billiatt Conservation Park.

It is classified as an IUCN Category Ib protected area.

== See also ==
- Protected areas of South Australia
