= Pata, South Australia =

Pata South Australia
- Coordinates: 34.564°S 140.525°E
- Population: 81 (SAL 2021)
- Elevation: 45 m (148 ft)
- Location: 15 km (9 mi) south of Loxton; 20 km (12 mi) north of Alawoona
- LGA(s): District Council of Loxton Waikerie
- State electorate(s): Chaffey
- Federal division(s): Barker
Localities around Pata:
	Loxton
Pyap West	Pata	Woodleigh
	Veitch	Malpas

Pata is a locality and former town in the Murray Mallee region of South Australia. It lies on the Loxton railway line and Karoonda Highway between Alawoona and Loxton. The town was surveyed as Muljarra in 1915, and renamed to Pata (an Aboriginal name meaning swamp gum trees) in 1929.

The Congregational Union church opened in 1911.
