= Browns Well Highway =

Highway in South Australia

Browns Well Highway South Australia
- Coordinates: 34.452560°S 140.570751°E (North end); 35.260949°S 140.911784°E (South end)

General information
- Type: Highway
- Length: 104 km (65 mi)
- Gazetted: 2008
- Route number(s): B57 (1998–present)

Major junctions
- North end: Karoonda Highway; Loxton, South Australia
- Cameron Highway
- South end: Mallee Highway; Pinnaroo, South Australia

Location(s)
- Region: Murray and Mallee
- Major settlements: Paruna

Highway system
- Highways in Australia; National Highway • Freeways in Australia; Highways in South Australia

Browns Well Highway is a road connecting Loxton, South Australia through the Murray Mallee to Pinnaroo in South Australia. It was named in 2008 after the Browns Well district for areas traversed by the highway.

Railways were evenly spaced across the Mallee before road transport improved. The Browns Well highway crosses the Loxton railway line on the outskirts of the town, the former Barmera railway line at Paruna about 34 km along the route, and the former Peebinga railway line 64 km along the route. It crosses the Pinnaroo railway line in Pinnaroo near the southern terminus of the highway. These all provided reliable transport to pioneer settlers in the region, including transporting grain and produce through Tailem Bend to markets.

== Major intersections ==
LGA	Location	km	mi	Destinations	Notes
Loxton Waikerie	Loxton	0	0.0	Bookpurnong Road (B55) – Waikerie, Kingston On Murray, Berri	Northern terminus of highway and route B57
Loxton Waikerie	Paruna	34	21	Cameron Highway – Alawoona	
Loxton Waikerie	Peebinga	61	38	Butchers Soak Road – Peebinga	
Southern Mallee	Pinnaroo	104	65	Mallee Highway (B12) – Tailem Bend, Lameroo, Ouyen	Southern terminus of highway, route B57 continues south along Mallee Highway for 7km to Ngarkat Highway
Route transition
