= Holleton Important Bird Area =

Important Bird Area in Western Australia

Coordinates: 31°51′04″S 118°58′16″E

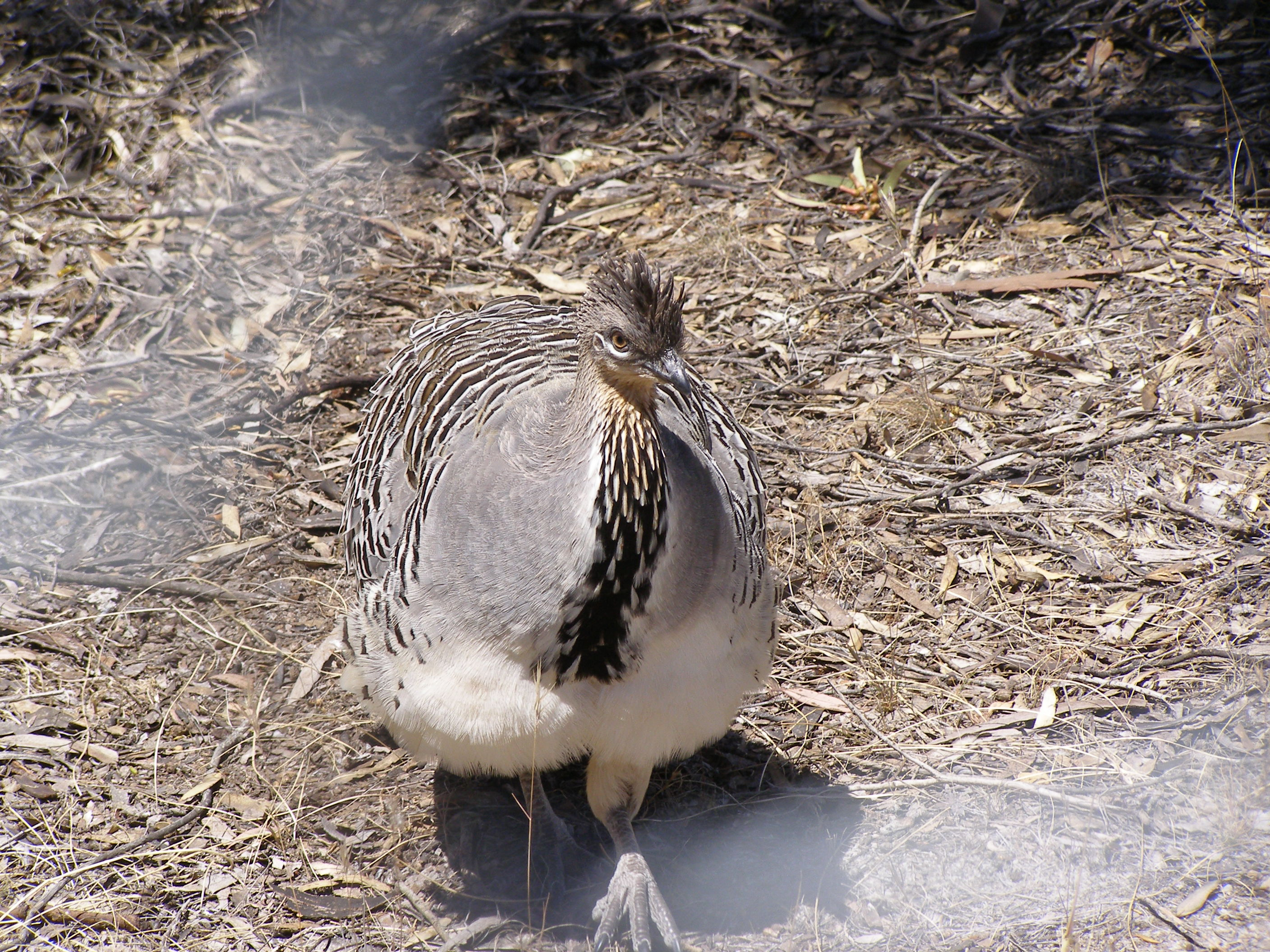
The IBA is important for malleefowl conservation

Holleton Important Bird Area is a tract of land in the eastern wheatbelt region of Western Australia about 290 km east of Perth.

== Description ==
The 322 km^{2} site represents one of the largest areas of continuous Acacia and Allocasuarina shrublands left within the wheatbelt. It also contains eucalypt woodlands. The area has cool winters and hot dry summers, with an annual rainfall of about 300 mm.

== Birds ==
It has been identified by BirdLife International as an Important Bird Area (IBA) because it contains habitat for the vulnerable malleefowl as well four bird species restricted to the mallee and south-western biome, the blue-breasted fairywren, rufous treecreeper, western yellow robin and purple-gaped honeyeater.
