= Peebinga railway line =

Former railway line in South Australia

Overview
- Status: Closed and removed
- Locale: Murraylands
- Coordinates: 34°56′5″S 140°54′17″E
- Termini: Karoonda; Peebinga
- Continues from: Barmera line

Service
- System: South Australian Railways
- Operator(s): South Australian Railways (to 1978); Australian National Railways Commission (from 1978)

History
- Opened: 18 December 1914
- Closed: 7 December 1990

Technical
- Line length: 106.2 km (66.0 mi)
- Track gauge: 1600 mm (5 ft 3 in)

The Peebinga railway line was a 106 kilometres (66 miles) 1600 mm (5 ft 3 in) broad-gauge railway line of the South Australian Railways. It opened on 18 December 1914, originating from a junction with the Barmera line at Karoonda. The line extended eastward through the Murraylands region, ultimately terminating at Peebinga, two kilometres from the Victorian state border. The railway was officially closed on 7 December 1990.

== History ==
The six railway lines of the Murraylands
Order built	Line	Year opened	Year closed	Length (mi)	Length (km)
1	Tailem Bend–Pinnaroo	1906	2015^{[note a]}	86.6	139.4
2	Tailem Bend–Barmera	1913 / 1928^{[note b]}	1996^{[note c]}	159.5	256.6
3	Karoonda–Peebinga	1914	1990	66.0	106.2
4	Karoonda–Waikerie	1914	1994^{[note d]}	73.8	118.7
5	Alawoona–Loxton	1914	2015^{[note e]}	22.0	35.5
6	Wanbi–Yinkanie	1925	1971	31.5	50.6
Total				439.4	707.0
Notes: 1. Previously a broad-gauge through line into Victoria, the line was closed at the border in 1996 before being converted to standard gauge in 1998.; 2. Construction of the Barmera line was paused at Paringa in 1913 pending funding of a bridge over the River Murray. The line was completed to Barmera in 1928. A branch line was built to support construction of the proposed Chowilla Dam in 1966–67. Some 27.3 kilometres (17.0 miles) long, it branched from the Barmera line 8 kilometres (5 miles) south of Paringa and proceeded to Murtho on the south bank of the River Murray. Construction of the dam was deferred in 1967 and subsequently cancelled; later the line was removed without being used.; 3. Paringa–Barmera closed in 1984; Alawoona–Paringa closed in 1990; Tailem Bend–Alawoona closed in 1996.; 4. Galga–Waikerie closed in 1990.; 5. Converted to standard gauge in 1996.

The railway ran eastward from Karoonda, then veered northeast, helping to open agricultural lands between the Pinnaroo line, which had been operational since 1906, and the Barmera line, which was still under construction when approval for the Peebinga line was granted. Construction costs were estimated at £207,000 plus £56,690 for rolling stock. Although the net operating loss was projected at £11,804 per annum, the amount was deemed acceptable since it enabled agriculture on 621,000 acres (2510 km^{2}) of previously undeveloped land.

The last scheduled goods train service ran on the line on 29 April 1980, The line becoming grain-only by the end of 1981, and limited grain haulage continued for a few more seasons. The last train out of Peebinga was on 11 July 1991. The line was dismantled in 1995; rails and sleepers were collected and all infrastructure was removed.

Stations and unstaffed sidings were established along the route, and several townships grew, but none have survived today. They included:

- Nunkeri
- Yurgo
- Marama (a 1930 hall still stands on the Karoonda-Lameroo road)
- Kulkami (with bulk grain silos on the Karoonda-Lameroo road)
- Mulpata
- Wirha (located near Billiat Road)
- Gurrai (with bulk grain silos)
- Karte
- Kringin (near Peebinga Conservation Park)
- Mootatunga (near Peebinga Conservation Park, 2.5 kilometres (1.6 mi) west of Browns Well Highway)
- Peebinga (bulk grain silos remain on the station site).

== Consideration of extension ==
In 1927–28, consideration was given to extending the Peebinga railway line across the state border into Victoria then northward to Morkalla. This extension would have connected with what later became the Victorian Railways' Morkalla railway line, which at that time terminated at Meringur. Nothing came of the proposal.
