= Kringin, South Australia =

Kringin South Australia
- Coordinates: 34°59′12″S 140°46′53″E
- Population: 3 (SAL 2016)
- Established: 25 September 1924 (town); 28 September 2000 (locality)
- Postcode(s): 5304
- Elevation: 89 m (292 ft)(railway station)
- Time zone: ACST (UTC+9:30)
  - Summer (DST): ACST (UTC+10:30)
- Location: 199 km (124 mi) E of Adelaide; 61 km (38 mi) S of Loxton; 40 km (25 mi) NW of Pinnaroo
- LGA(s): District Council of Loxton Waikerie
- Region: Murray and Mallee
- County: Chandos
- State electorate(s): Chaffey
- Federal division(s): Barker
Mean max temp	Mean min temp	Annual rainfall
22.9 °C; 73 °F	8.8 °C; 48 °F	382.3 mm 15.1 in
Suburbs around Kringin:
Malpas	Malpas; Paruna; Merbah	Merbah
Malpas	Kringin	Merbah; Peebinga
Karte	Karte	Karte
- Footnotes: Locations; Adjoining localities

Kringin is a town and a locality in the Australian state of South Australia located in the state’s east about 199 kilometres (124 mi) east of the state capital of Adelaide and about 61 kilometres (38 mi) south of the municipal seat of Loxton.

The government town of Kringin was proclaimed on 25 September 1924 on land on the boundaries of the cadastral units of the hundreds of Kingsford and Peebinga to the immediate north-west of the Kringin Railway Station. The town was named after the railway station, a stop on the now-closed Peebinga railway line, and whose name is derived from an aboriginal word meaning “growing” or “springing up.” The boundaries for the locality were created on 28 September 2000 and includes the site of the Government Town of Kringin which is located in its south-eastern corner adjacent to the Peebinga Conservation Park.

A school operated in the town from 1926 to 1945. In 1991, it was reported that members of the Vietnam Veterans’ Association were planning to purchase the town and develop it both as holiday accommodation and as a retirement community for Vietnam veterans.

Land use within the locality is mainly concerned with “primary production” while land in its south-east corner located in the protected area, the Peebinga Conservation Park, is zoned for “conservation”.

Kringin is located within the federal division of Barker, the state electoral district of Chaffey and the local government area of the District Council of Loxton Waikerie.
