= District Council of Waikerie =

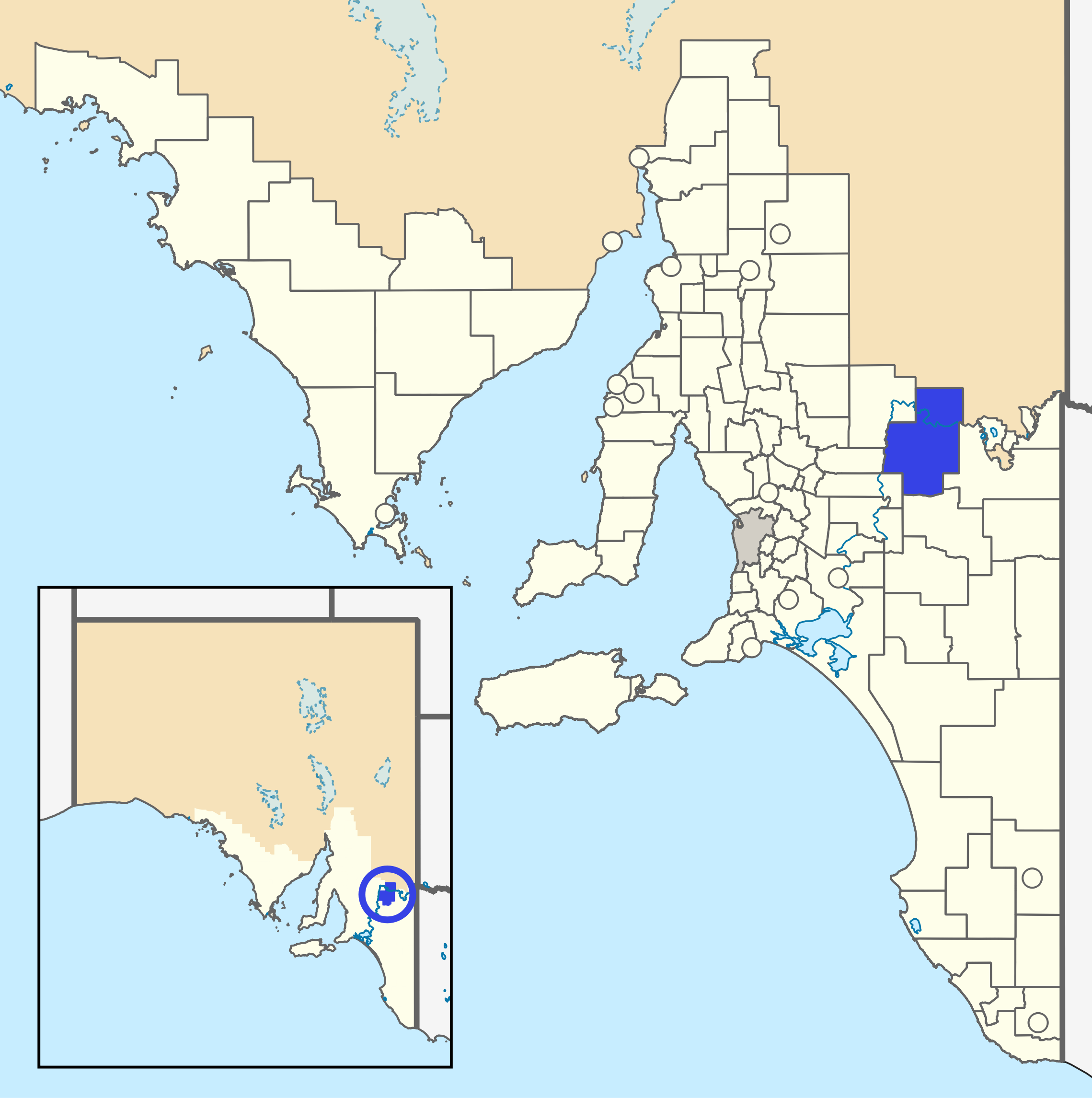
The District Council of Waikerie as it was prior to disestablishment (blue)

The District Council of Waikerie was a local government area in South Australia from 1914 to 1997, centring on the town of Waikerie.

It was proclaimed on 19 February 1914 as a seven-member council comprising the cadastral Hundreds of Waikerie and Holder. It adopted a ward system in February 1923, with seven wards (Town, Waikerie, Ramco, Qualco, New Well, Holder South and Holder North) each electing one councillor. In 1923, the council was described as "the hub of what is one of the best fruitgrowing areas in the state", with Waikerie "a comparatively new township of rapid growth". In that year, the council was responsible for an area of 300,800 acres, with a population estimated at 1,866, including 400 ratepayers, and capital value of ratable property of £476,700. It initially operated out of the business office of its district clerk in Waikerie, but opened its own chambers on 12 May 1933.

It gained the Hundred of Paisley from the District Council of Swan Reach on 7 September 1933, a change that "very nearly doubled" the municipality in size. In 1936, it covered an area of 546,000 acres, with 3,148 acres of irrigable land and 7,291 acres of non-irrigable land under cultivation, and had a population estimated at 2,916, including 707 ratepayers. In that year, the capital value of the ratable property in the irrigation area was £461,000, and in the whole of the district £752,720. On 4 July 1960 the unincorporated Hundreds of Markaranka and Pooginook were added to the municipality, becoming the new Taylorville Ward. A boundary dispute with the District Council of Morgan followed, and both hundreds were severed from Waikerie and attached to Morgan on 18 April 1963, but returned to Waikerie on 1 July 1965 following further controversy.

The council was heavily involved in the local response to the 1956 Murray River flood, which badly affected the area. In 1965, it switched to a system of ten wards (Holder Irrigation, Holder South, New Well, Paisley, Qualco, Ramco, River, Taylorville, Town and Waikerie), each with one councillor, as well as an elected mayor; Town Ward subsequently received a second councillor in July 1977. On 11 April 1980, the council opened a new council chamber, library and offices. By 1986, the irrigation holdings in the district had increased to 5,000 hectares, of a total of 3002 square kilometres – growing, amongst other things, almost 50% of the stone fruit production of South Australia. In that year, the district had a population of 4,700, with 1,700 in Waikerie itself.

The council ceased to exist on 3 May 1997, when it amalgamated with the District Council of Brown's Well and the District Council of Loxton to form the District Council of Loxton Waikerie, with Loxton being selected as the new council seat.

== Chairmen and mayors of the District Council of Waikerie ==
- John Handcock Strangman (1930–1957)
- Jack Clover Andrew (1957–1961)
- Arthur Clair Kleemann (1961–1966)
- Donald Rex Elliott (1966-?)
- Ian Ronald Oliver (1985-?)

== Notable councillors ==
- Neil Andrew, future Speaker of the Australian House of Representatives (1976–1983)
