= Paruna, South Australia =

Paruna
- Town
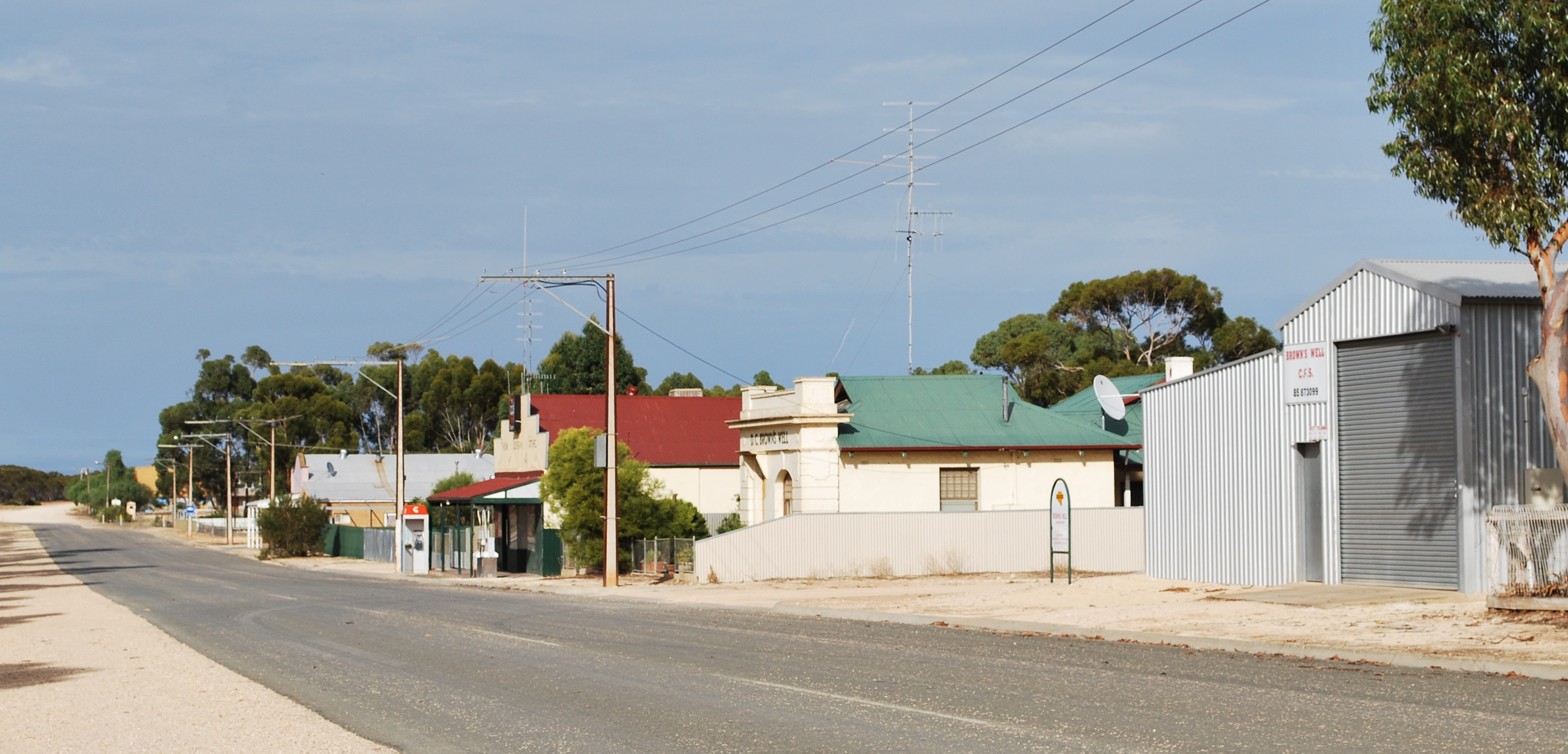
- Railway Terrace, the main street of Paruna

- Coordinates: 34°43′12″S 140°43′42″E
- Country: Australia
- State: South Australia
- Region: Murray and Mallee
- LGA: District Council of Loxton Waikerie
- Location: 237 km (147 mi) E of Adelaide; 34 km (21 mi) S of Loxton; 70 km (43 mi) N of Pinnaroo
- Established: 23 July 1914 (town); 28 September 2000 (locality)

Government
  - State electorate: Chaffey
  - Federal division: Barker
- Elevation at former railway station: 59 m (194 ft)

Population
  - Total: 36 (SAL 2021)
- Time zone: UTC+9:30 (ACST)
  - Summer (DST): UTC+10:30 (ACST)
- Postcode: 5311
- County: Alfred
- Mean max temp: 24.0 °C (75.2 °F)
- Mean min temp: 9.1 °C (48.4 °F)
- Annual rainfall: 263.2 mm (10.36 in)
Localities around Paruna
Pata	Pata; Woodleigh	Woodleigh
Malpas	Paruna	Meribah
Kringin	Kringin	Meribah

Paruna is a township in eastern South Australia on the Browns Well Highway, where it crosses the former Barmera railway line, 237 kilometres (147 mi) east of the state capital, Adelaide.

In the 2021 census, Paruna and the surrounding area had a population of 36, one-third lower than at the 2016 Australian census.

Purana is an Aboriginal word meaning "stopping place".

The government town of Paruna was proclaimed on 23 July 1914 on land in the cadastral unit of the Hundred of Kekwick to the immediate north of the Paruna railway station. The locality's boundaries were created on 28 September 2000 with the site of the government town of Paruna being located in its approximate centre.

The Barmera railway line from Adelaide was opened to Paruna on 1 May 1913 and a further 11 km to Meribah within the week. It was later extended north to Paringa then across the Paringa Bridge to Renmark and Barmera, but has now been closed and removed.

Paruna School operated between 1917 and 1965, and Paruna North School between 1925 and 1941. Brown's Well District Area School closed in 2007. The effects of prolonged drought and the movement of population to larger centres led to the closure of other facilities over recent years, including the general store and the golf club.

Paruna was the seat of the District Council of Brown's Well until a merger that created the District Council of Loxton Waikerie in 1997.

Paruna is located within the federal division of Barker, the state electoral district of Chaffey and the local government area of the District Council of Loxton Waikerie.

== Gallery ==
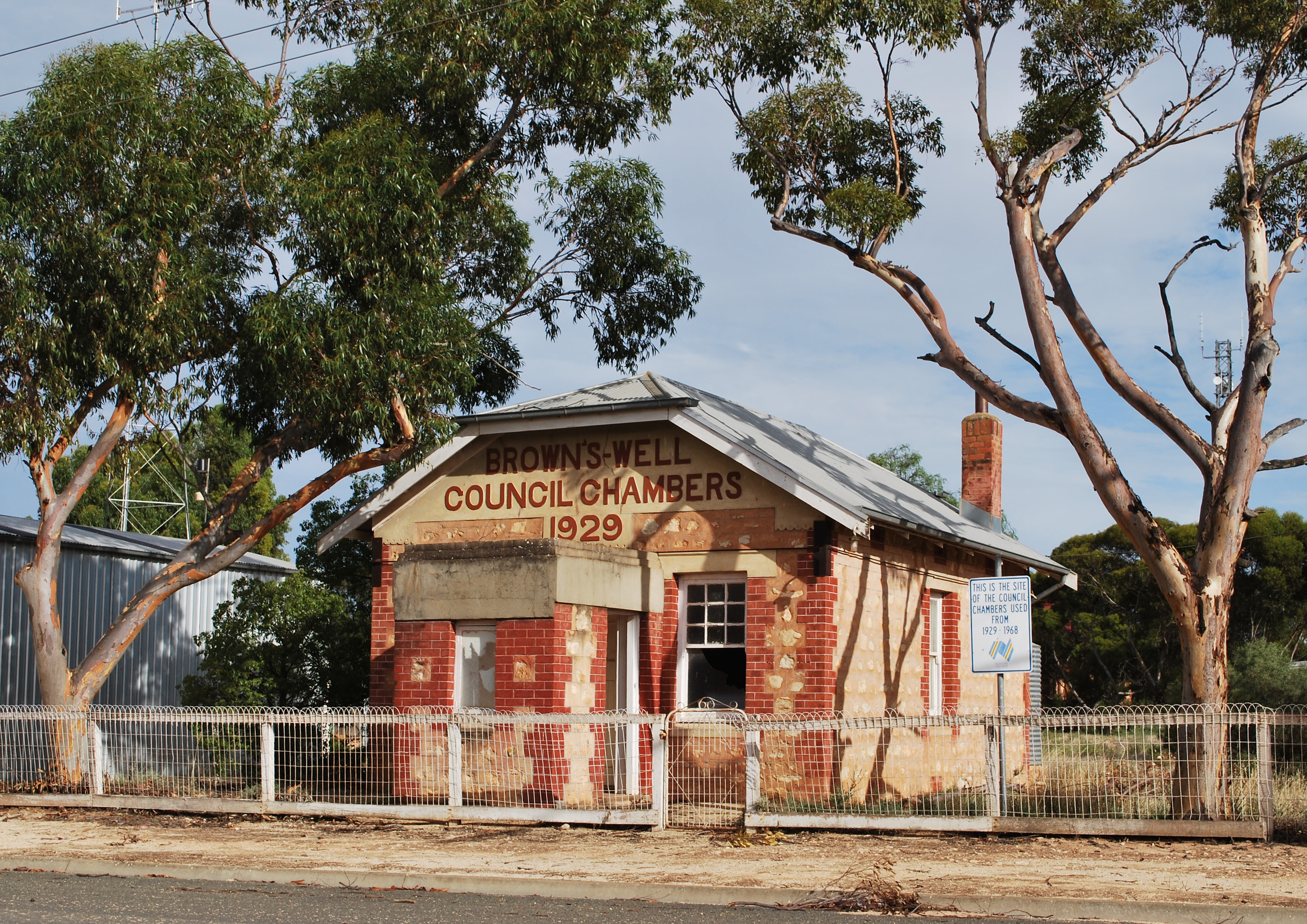
Former Brown's Well District Council chambers, Railway Terrace, Paruna

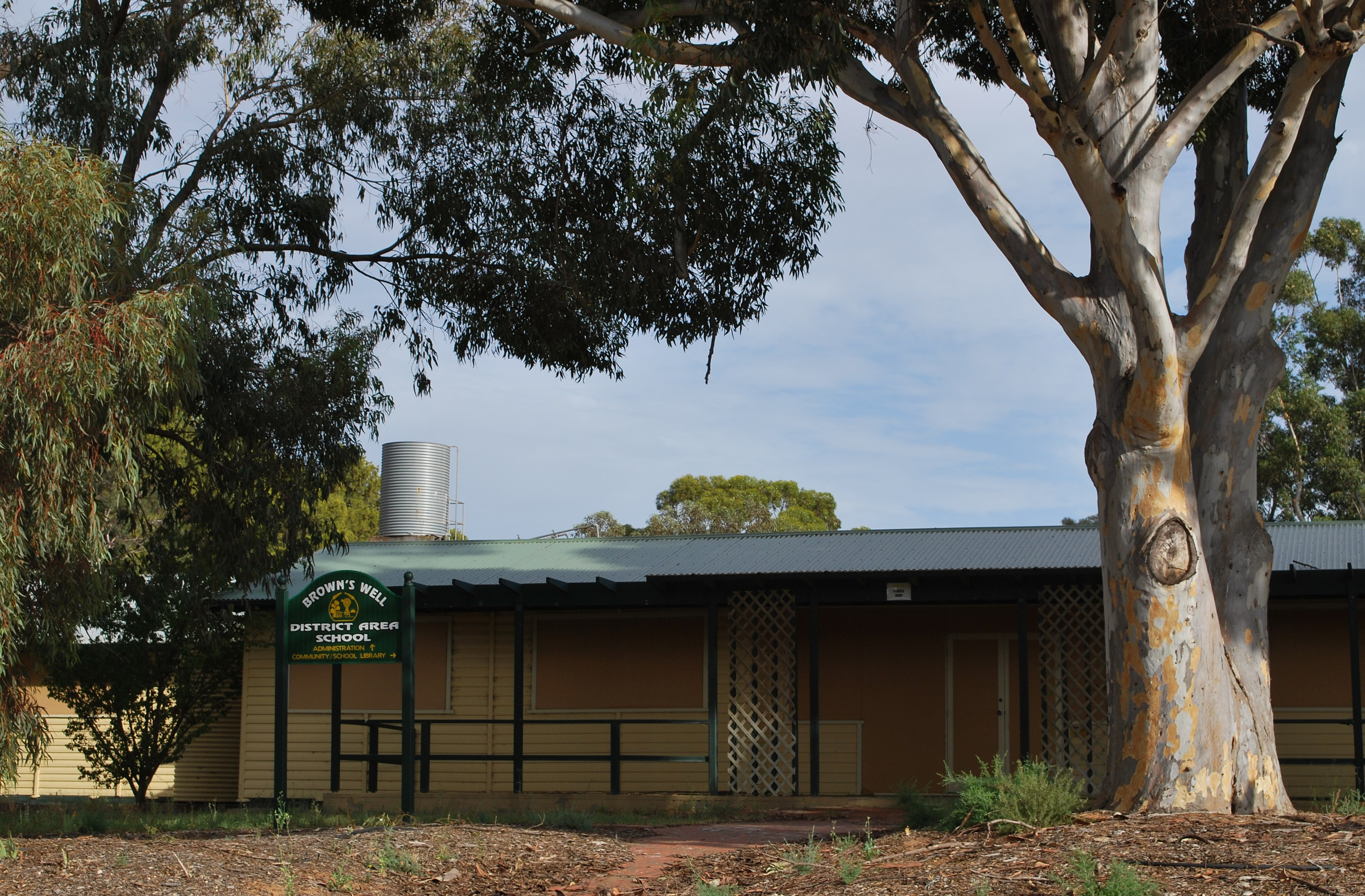
Former Brown's Well District area school

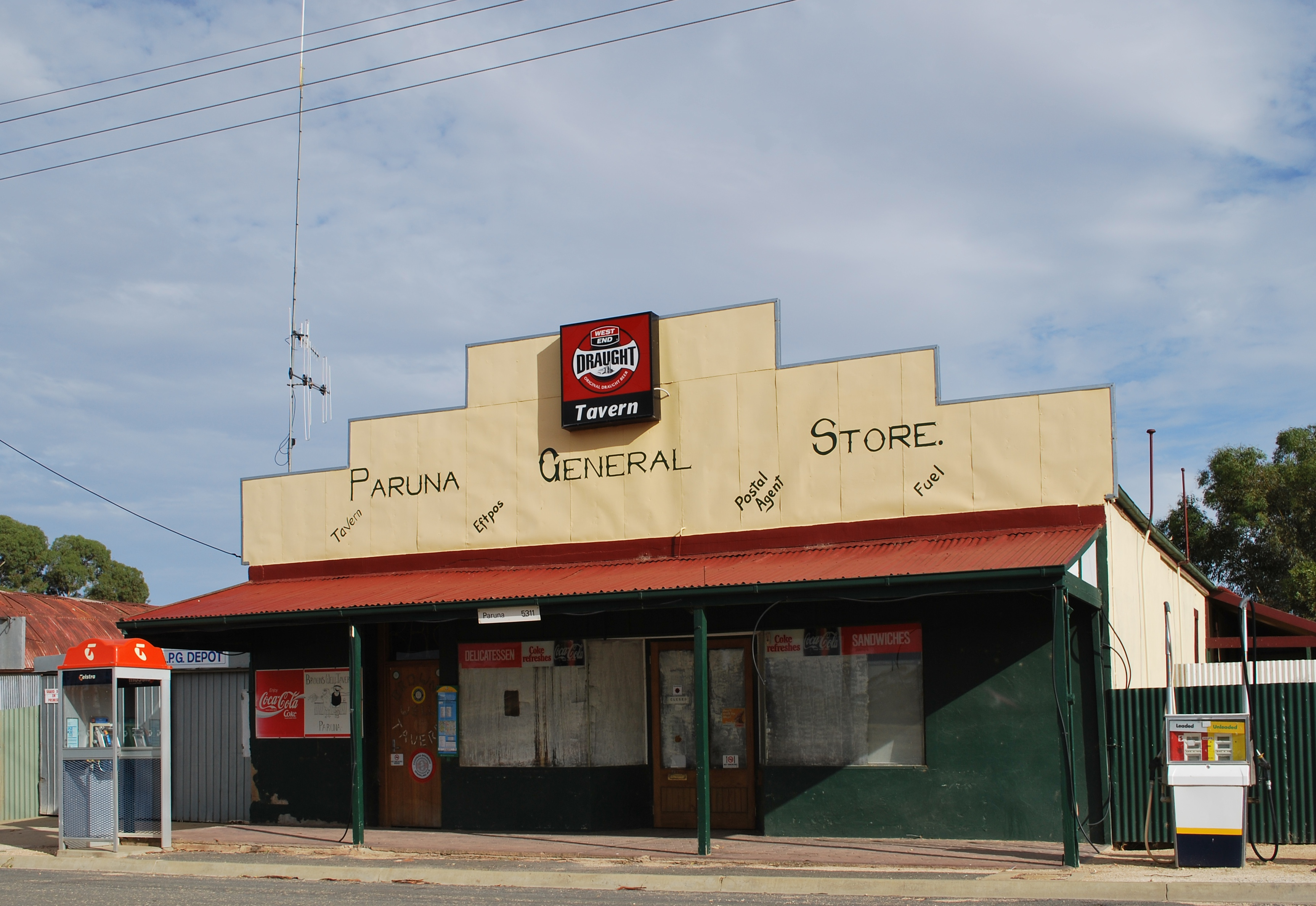
Paruna general store

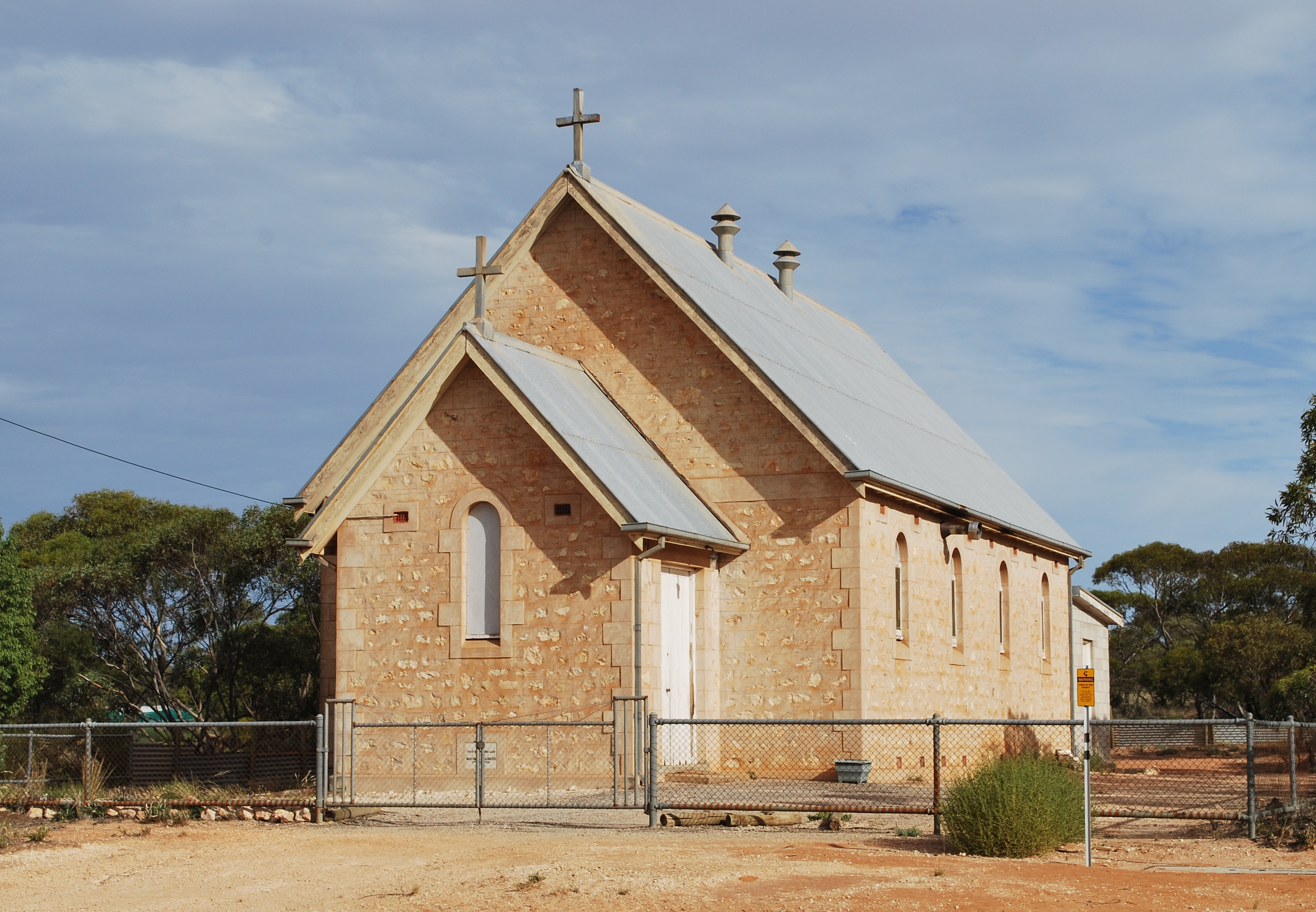
Closed church in High Street, Paruna
