= Peebinga Conservation Park =

Protected area in South Australia

- IUCN category Ia (strict nature reserve)
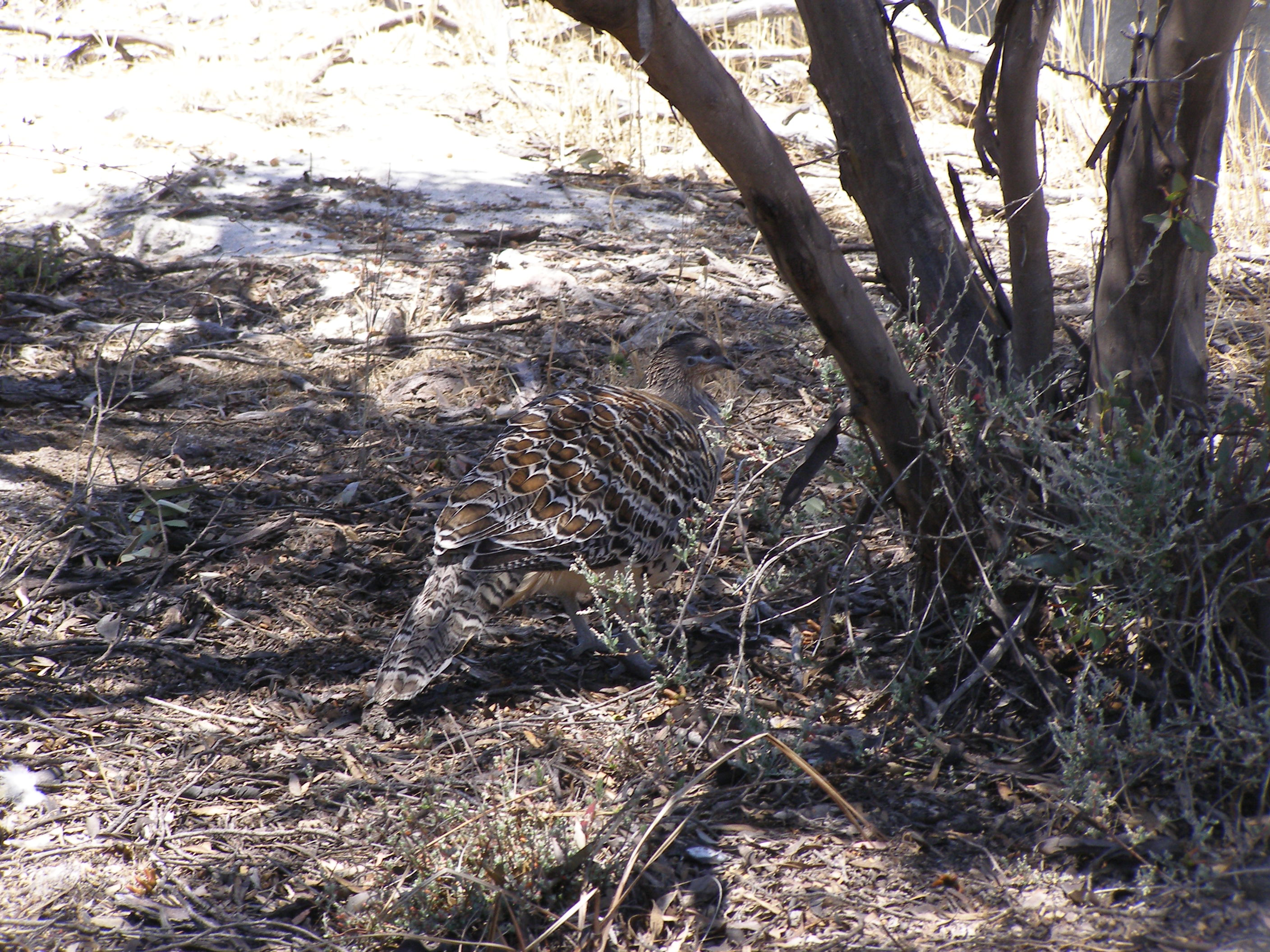
- The conservation park is an important site for malleefowl

- Location within South Australia
- Location: South Australia
- Nearest city: Peebinga
- Coordinates: 34°58′52″S 140°49′30″E
- Area: 33.61 km^{2} (12.98 sq mi)
- Established: 14 March 1940
- Governing body: Department for Environment and Water

Peebinga Conservation Park (formerly Peebinga National Park ) is a 34 km^{2} protected area lying 40 km north of the town of Pinnaroo in the Murray Mallee region of south-eastern South Australia, about 240 km east of Adelaide and 10 km west of the Victorian border.

== Description ==
The conservation park occupies a parcel of land that extends across the localities of Karte, Kringin and Peebinga from west to east and consists of all of the land in sections 19, 21, 22, 30, and 31 of the cadastral unit of the Hundred of Peebinga.

The conservation park contains much land that was previously cleared for agriculture. It is characterised by remnants of mallee woodland on low, stabilised dunes. with regenerating open shrubland and grassland on sand plains.

The conservation park is classified as an IUCN Category Ia protected area.

== History ==
The land under protection was first proclaimed as a flora and fauna reserve under the Crown Lands Act 1929 on 14 March 1940 in respect to sections 21, 22, 30, and 31 in the Hundred of Peebinga. On 30 September 1965, sections 19 and 30 were proclaimed under the Crown Lands Act 1929 as the Peebinga Wildlife Reserve. On 9 November 1967, the Peebinga National Park was proclaimed under the National Parks Act 1966 in respect to sections 19, 21, 22, 30, and 31. On 27 April 1972, the national park was reconstituted as the Peebinga Conservation Park upon the proclamation of the National Parks and Wildlife Act 1972. In 1982, the conservation park was listed on the now-defunct Register of the National Estate.

== Flora and fauna ==
As well as grasses, the vegetation features ridge-fruited and slender-leaved mallee with warty cypress pine over broombush; the higher areas have square-fruited, red and white mallees.

Fauna found in the conservation park includes western grey kangaroos and short-beaked echidnas.

=== Peebinga Important Bird Area ===
The conservation park has been identified by BirdLife International as an Important Bird Area (IBA) because it supports a relatively large population of malleefowl. It previously had a population of the eastern mallee subspecies of the western whipbird (Psophodes nigrogularis leucogaster), which is now locally extinct. Purple-gaped honeyeaters are present.

== See also ==
- Protected areas of South Australia
