= Karoonda Highway =

Road in South Australia

Karoonda Highway South Australia
- Coordinates: 35.116009°S 139.306968°E (Southwest end); 34.452555°S 140.570774°E (Northeast end)

General information
- Type: Highway
- Length: 172 km (107 mi)
- Route number(s): B55 (1998–present)

Major junctions
- Southwest end: Old Princes Highway; Murray Bridge, South Australia
- Cameron Highway; Browns Well Highway
- Northeast end: Bookpurnong Road; Loxton, South Australia

Location(s)
- Region: Murray and Mallee
- Major settlements: Karoonda, Alawoona

Highway system
- Highways in Australia; National Highway • Freeways in Australia; Highways in South Australia

Karoonda Highway is a 172-kilometre-long (107 mi) state-controlled highway in South Australia linking the Murray River towns of Murray Bridge and Loxton. It was created after local councils called for the renaming of the B55 road route.

== Route ==
Karoonda Highway begins at Murray Bridge East. It heads north-east to the town of Karoonda, and from there, continues on to Alawoona. Thereafter it heads north to Kingston Road, where it turns east to Loxton, its north-eastern terminus. Bookpurnong Road continues on from Loxton, connecting the highway to Berri and the Sturt Highway. Most of the route is close to the former Loxton railway line.

== History ==
In 2006, the local governments in the area, including Loxton Waikerie Council and Karoonda East Murray Council, called for the Loxton to Murray Bridge section of the B55 road route to be named Karoonda Highway, after the major town along the route. The B55 route actually extended past Loxton to Berri, which the councils initially didn't realise. By 2011, the route had been renamed Karoonda Highway from Loxton to Murray Bridge, and Bookpurnong Road north of Loxton to Berri.

In 2014, Karoonda Highway was rated as one of the worst roads in the states by South Australian motorists.

In the mid-2010s, the body of a little girl was found next to the highway and after a few months, authorities stated that the body was that of Khandalyce Pearce.

== Major intersections ==
| LGA | Location | km | mi | Destinations | Notes |
|---|---|---|---|---|---|
| Murray Bridge | Murray Bridge East | 0 | 0.0 | Old Princes Highway – Murray Bridge | Southwestern terminus of highway, route B55 continues west along Old Princes Highway through Murray Bridge |
| Murray Bridge | Burdett | 6 | 3.7 | Burdett Road – Mannum | |
| Karoonda East Murray | Kulde, Wynarka | 38 | 24 | Kulde Road – Tailem Bend | |
| Karoonda East Murray | Karoonda | 62 | 39 | Kulkami Road – Lameroo | |
| Loxton Waikerie | Alawoona | 137 | 85 | Cameron Highway – Paruna | |
| Loxton Waikerie | Loxton | 169 | 105 | Kingston Road – Kingston On Murray, Waikerie | |
| Loxton Waikerie | Loxton | 172 | 107 | Browns Well Highway (B57 south) – Paruna, Pinnaroo | |
| Loxton Waikerie | Loxton | 172 | 107 | Bookpurnong Road (B55 east) – Berri | Northeastern terminus of highway, route B55 continues east along Bookpurnong Road to Berri |
Route transition

== See also ==
- List of road routes in South Australia
