= Taldra, South Australia =

Taldra South Australia
- Coordinates: 34°21′S 140°50′E
- Population: 32 (2016 census)
- Postcode(s): 5311
- Elevation: 24 m (79 ft)
- Time zone: ACST (UTC+9:30)
  - Summer (DST): ACDT (UTC+10:30)
- LGA(s): District Council of Loxton Waikerie
- State electorate(s): Chaffey
- Federal division(s): Barker
Localities around Taldra:
Pike River	Yamba
Bugle Hut	Taldra	Murray-Sunset
Woodleigh	Taplan

Taldra (postcode 5311) is a small settlement in the northeastern Murray Mallee region of South Australia adjoining the border with Victoria. The aboriginal word taldra means kangaroo. At the 2016 census, Taldra had a population of 36.

The railway through Taldra opened on 13 October 1913 but closed in the 1980s. The former towns and sidings between Taplan and Taldra are now incorporated in the Bounded Locality of Taldra. They were Nangari, Pungonda, Noora and Ingalta (all south of Taldra township). Little remains of any of these settlements. Nangari once had a shop, Noora once had a football team. Taldra still has grain silos at the former railway station erected in the 1950s, but if they are used, they are cleared by road, not rail.
