= Peebinga, South Australia =

Peebinga South Australia
- Coordinates: 34°55′52″S 140°54′32″E
- Population: 35 (SAL 2021)
- Established: 25 September 1924 (town); 28 September 2000 (locality)
- Postcode(s): 5304
- Time zone: ACST (UTC+9:30)
  - Summer (DST): ACST (UTC+10:30)
- Location: 211 km (131 mi) E of Adelaide; 45 km (28 mi) N of Pinnaroo; 69 km (43 mi) SE of Loxton
- LGA(s): District Council of Loxton Waikerie
- Region: Murray and Mallee
- County: Chandos
- State electorate(s): Chaffey
- Federal division(s): Barker
| Mean max temp | Mean min temp | Annual rainfall |
| 23.0 °C; 73 °F | 7.8 °C; 46 °F | 326.9 mm 12.9 in |
Localities around Peebinga:
| Kringin | Meribah | Victoria |
| Kringin | Peebinga | Victoria |
| Karte | Karte | Victoria |
- Footnotes: Adjoining localities

Peebinga is a town and locality in the Australian state of South Australia. Peebinga was the terminus of the Peebinga railway line which was built in 1914 as part of a major state government project to open up the Murray Mallee for grazing and cropping.

When the railway was built, it terminated in the scrub in the district of Peebinga. The town was later surveyed in 1924 adjacent to the railway station. The current locality of Peebinga includes the historic place of Mootatunga. Mootatunga was the next-to-last stop on the railway line, and is now adjacent to Peebinga Conservation Park and the Browns Well Highway, 5 km west of Peebinga itself. Peebinga was named by Governor of South Australia, Tom Bridges after the district, which had previously been named by Governor Day Bosanquet in 1912 from the Aboriginal name for a rock hole in the area. Mootatunga was the native name for a totem of the tribe. The town was also surveyed in 1924.

The railway closed in 1990. The post office opened in 1926 and closed in 1986. Peebinga school opened in 1938 but is now also closed.

Peebinga is located within the federal division of Barker, the state Electoral district of Chaffey and the local government area of the District Council of Loxton Waikerie.
