= Billiatt Conservation Park =

Protected area in South Australia

- IUCN category VI (protected area with sustainable use of natural resources)
- Location within South Australia
- Location: South Australia, Sandalwood
- Nearest city: Sandalwood
- Coordinates: 34°55′27″S 140°17′13″E
- Area: 8.02 km^{2} (3.10 sq mi)
- Established: 12 December 1940
- Governing body: Department of Environment and Water

Billiatt Conservation Park, formerly the Billiatt National Park, is a protected area in the Australian state of South Australia located in the locality of Sandalwood about 200 kilometres (120 mi) east of the state capital of Adelaide.

== Description ==
The conservation park occupies a parcel of land known as "Allotment 101 of Deposited Plan 51151" in the cadastral unit of the Hundred of Auld in the locality of Sandalwood.

The country is characterised by sand dunes with a mosaic of open mallee scrub. Ridge-fruited and red-tipped slender leaf mallees add colour to the dunes with broombush growing in the mottled shade.

Since 2008, "certain existing and future rights of entry, prospecting, exploration or mining" permitted under the state's Mining Act 1971 have applied to the extent of the conservation park.

As of 2018, it covered an area of 8.02 square kilometres (3.10 sq mi).

The conservation park is classified as an IUCN Category VI protected area.

== History ==
The land under protection was first proclaimed as a "flora and fauna reserve" under the Crown Lands Act 1929 on 12 December 1940 in respect to section 15 in the Hundred of Billiatt.

On 23 September 1965, the following land was proclaimed under the Crown Lands Act 1929 as the Billiatt Wildlife Reserve - section 26 in the Hundred of Auld and section 18 in the Hundred of Billiatt.

On 30 September 1965, land proclaimed as a wildlife reserve earlier in the month was re-proclaimed as a wildlife reserve under the National Park and Wild Life Reserves Act 1891.

On 9 November 1967, the Billiatt National Park was proclaimed under the National Parks Act 1966 in respect to section 26 in the Hundred of Auld and sections 15 and 18 in the Hundred of Billiatt.

On 27 April 1972, the national park was reconstituted as the Billiatt Conservation Park upon the proclamation of the National Parks and Wildlife Act 1972. Its boundaries were subsequently enlarged by the addition of the following land:

1. On 11 January 1973, sections 21 and 22 in the Hundred of Billiatt were added.
2. On 10 January 1980, section 13 in the Hundred of Auld and section 19 in the Hundred of Billiatt were added.
3. On 3 November 1983, sections 24 to 30 in the Hundred of Billiatt were added.
4. On 16 May 1985, section 27 in the Hundred of Auld, section 23 in the Hundred of Billiatt and sections 42 to 45, 48, 49 and 53 in the Hundred of Kingsford were added.
5. On 28 November 1985, section 28 in the Hundred of Auld was added.
6. On 24 July 2008, sections 14 and 16 in the Hundred of Billiatt and "Allotment 101 of Deposited Plan 51151" in the Hundred of Auld were added.

Also, on 24 July 2008, all of the land within the conservation park with the exception of "Allotment 101 of Deposited Plan 51151" was constituted by proclamation under the Wilderness Protection Act 1992 as a wilderness protection area named as the Billiatt Wilderness Protection Area and thereby was removed from the conservation park.

In 1980, when the conservation park's area was 368.14 square kilometres (142.14 sq mi), it was listed on the now-defunct Register of the National Estate.

== Fauna ==
Pygmy possums and eighteen species of reptile inhabit the park.

== Recognition by non-government organisations ==
Billiatt Conservation Park is part of an area of land considered by BirdLife International to be an Important Bird Area because it contains small but globally important populations of malleefowl, mallee emu-wren and purple-gaped honeyeater, as well as the rare western whipbird and red-lored whistler.

== See also ==
- Protected areas of South Australia
- Caladenia tensa
