= Hundred of Peebinga =

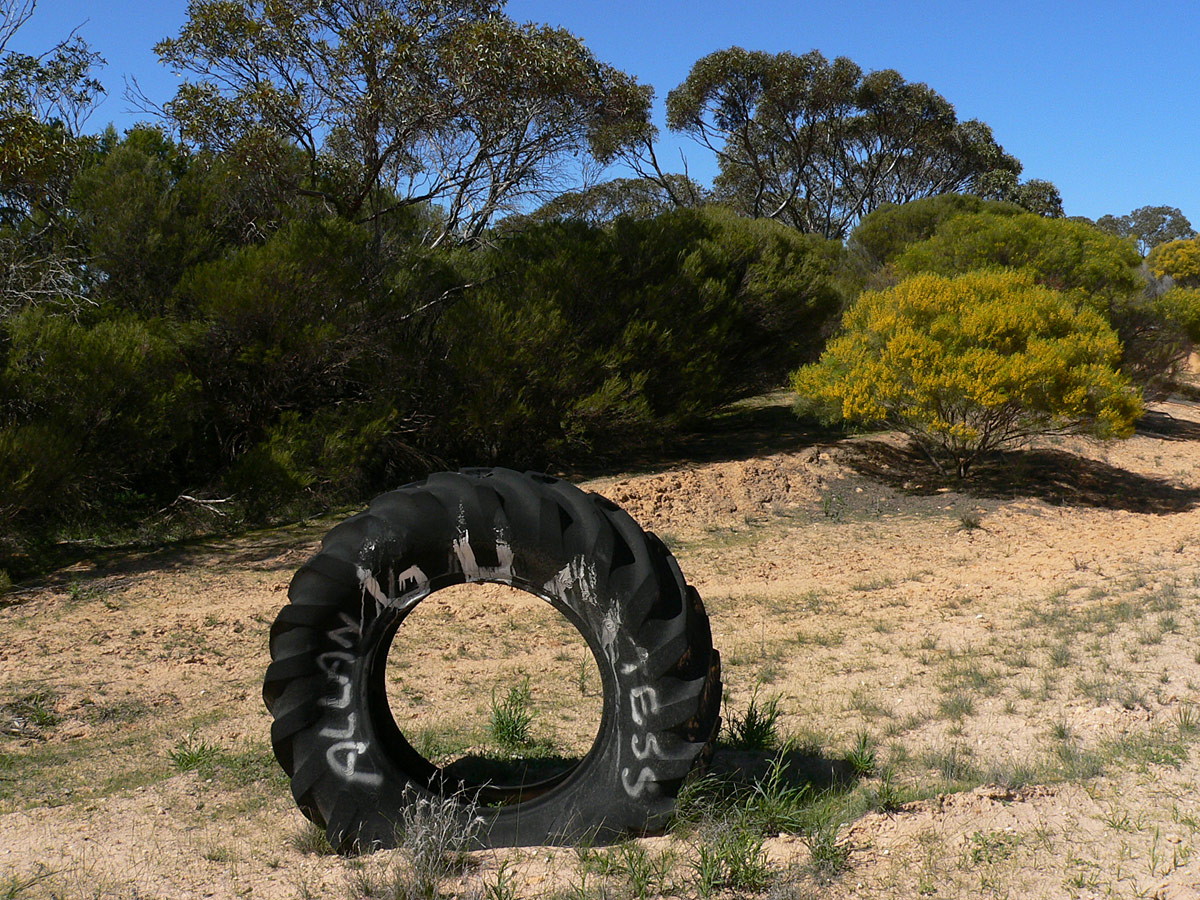
Peebinga, South Australia

Peeninga is a hundred within the County of Chandos, South Australia established in 1912.

== History ==
The traditional owners of the land are the Ngargad Australian Aboriginal tribes.

== See also ==
- Lands administrative divisions of South Australia
