= Alawoona =

- Town
- Coordinates: 34°44′11″S 140°30′33″E
- Country: Australia
- State: South Australia
- LGA: District Council of Loxton Waikerie
- Location: 35 km (22 mi) S of Loxton; 75 km (47 mi) NE of Karoonda
- Established: 9 July 1914 (town)

Government
  - State electorate: Chaffey
  - Federal division: Barker
- Elevation: 70 m (230 ft)

Population
  - Total: 25 (SAL 2021)
- Postcode: 5311

Alawoona is a town in the Murray Mallee region of South Australia. At the 2021 census, Alawoona had a population of 25. It lies on the Karoonda Highway and Loxton railway line where they both change direction from easterly to continue northwards for 35 km to Loxton.

== History ==
Alawoona was established as one of the original sidings during the construction of the Barmera railway line in 1906, 76.5 miles (123.1 km) from Tailem Bend. Soon after, Alawoona became a junction when the spur line to Loxton was built. The town was surveyed in 1914 and is named for the local Aboriginal word for place of hot winds. The post office opened on 1 March 1915 and was closed on 18 March 1988.
