= Friends of Parks South Australia =

South Australian organisation representing community conservation groups

Friends of Parks and Nature South Australia
- Formation: 1993
- Type: Umbrella organisation
- Headquarters: Adelaide, South Australia
- Members: 5,000+ (2022)
- President (2015–): Duncan MacKenzie OAM
- Website: friendsofparkssa.org.au

Friends of Parks and Nature South Australia, registered as Friends of Parks and Nature Inc., (FoPInc), is an independent umbrella organisation established to serve and represent the interests of volunteer community groups helping to protect flora, fauna, heritage and other significant sites within South Australia's protected area system. FoPInc collaborates with the South Australian Department for Environment and Water (DEW) and the National Parks and Wildlife Service South Australia (NPWS). As of August 2024 FoPInc has 144 member groups.

== History ==
"Friends" groups are typically affiliated with a specific conservation park, historic site or other protected area. The first such group started at Fort Glanville Conservation Park in 1980, where there had been an existing historical society. The second group was formed at Ferguson Conservation Park in Stonyfell. In 1983, the National Parks and Wildlife Service set up the Friends of Old Government House in Belair National Park. The success of the Friends model had been demonstrated and in the following years many more groups were set up.

FoPInc was established as a charitable organisation on 1 November 1999, and has an associated gift fund with Deductible Gift Recipient status.

Originally named Friends of Parks South Australia, the organisation changed its name to Friends of Parks and Nature South Australia in August 2024.

== Description and structure ==
FoPInc is governed by a board, and is supported by a secretariat provided through DEW's Volunteer and Visitor Programs Unit, based in Adelaide, which coordinates the network of member groups.

Member groups may be either "full" (working on-park, and may or may not be incorporated in their own right), or "affiliate" (involved with other DEW-endorsed projects, and incorporated in their own right). Each group is supported by a NPWS Liaison Ranger, to ensure co-ordination with the goals and policies of DEW and park management plans.

The objectives of "Friends" groups are: to provide opportunities for public participation in the management of national parks and historic sites; to raise funds to support national parks, historic sites and the social functions of the Friends group; to publicise national parks and historic sites as well as the objectives of the Friends; and to provide cultural and social events for the benefit of members, staff and the general public.

Each Friends group is financially self-supporting, through a combination of members fees and fund-raising. In addition, the Department of Environment and Water (DEW) provides "Small Grants" for which individual groups may apply on a project basis.

Collectively FoPInc represents over 5,000 individual volunteers in South Australia, who are each affiliated with one or more specific member groups associated with a national park or historic site. In 2015–16, members of Friends groups contributed the equivalent of 11,161 days of volunteer work to the state's protected areas.

As of January 2022 the president of Friends of Parks is Duncan MacKenzie OAM.

== List of places with Friends groups ==
=== Parks ===
- Aldinga Scrub Conservation Park
- Althorpe Islands Conservation Park
- Angove Conservation Park
- Anstey Hill Recreation Park
- Beachport Conservation Park
- Belair National Park
- Black Hill Conservation Park
- Blackwood Forest Recreation Park
- Blue Lake
- Brookfield Conservation Park
- Brown Hill Creek
- Burra Parks
- Butchers Gap Conservation Park
- Canunda National Park
- Cape Gantheaume Conservation Park
- Cleland National Park
- Clements Gap Conservation Park
- Cobbler Creek Recreation Park
- Coffin Bay National Park
- Coorong National Park
- Cox Scrub Conservation Park
- Deep Creek National Park
- Dingley Dell Conservation Park
- Ferguson Conservation Park
- Ikara–Flinders Ranges National Park
- Gammon Ranges National Park
- Gawler Ranges National Park
- Granite Island Recreation Park
- Great Victoria Desert Parks
- Hallett Cove Conservation Park
- Harding Springs Park
- The Innamincka Reserves
- Dhilba Guuranda–Innes National Park
- Kaiserstuhl Conservation Park
- Kangaroo Island Parks
- Kenneth Stirling Conservation Park
- Kimba, South Australia District Parks
- Kyeema Conservation Park
- Lake Newland and Waldegrave Islands
- Lake Ormerod
- Little Dip Conservation Park
- Lobethal Bushland Park
- Lower Field River
- Marino Conservation Park
- Mark Oliphant Conservation Park
- Moana Sands Conservation Park
- Monarto Safari Park
- Morialta Conservation Park
- Mound Springs
- Mount Billy Conservation Park
- Mount Gambier Area Parks
- Mount George Conservation Park
- Mount Monster Conservation Park
- Mount Osmond Conservation Park
- Mount Remarkable National Park
- Murray River (Friends of the River Inc)
- Mutton Cove
- Mylor Conservation Park
- Naracoorte Caves
- Nene Valley Conservation Park
- Newland Head Conservation Park
- O'Halloran Hill Recreation Park
- Onkaparinga Park
- Para Wirra Conservation Park
- Riverland Parks
- Sandy Creek Conservation Park
- Sceale Bay
- Scott Conservation Park
- Scott Creek Conservation Park
- Sellicks Beach
- Shepherds Hill Recreation Park
- Simpson Desert Parks
- Southern Eyre Peninsula Parks
- Southern Mallee Parks
- Spring Gully Conservation Park
- St Peter and St Francis Island Parks
- Streaky Bay District Parks
- Sturt Gorge Recreation Park
- Telowie Gorge Conservation Park (Note: Now part of Wapma Thura–Southern Flinders Ranges National Park)
- The Dutchmans Stern Conservation Park
- Totness Recreation Park
- Troubridge Island Conservation Park
- Whyalla Conservation Park
- Woorabinda Bushland Reserves

=== Buildings ===
- Adelaide Gaol
- Fort Glanville
- Martindale Hall
- Mt Lofty Fire Tower
- Old Government House

=== Other ===
- Adelaide Dolphin Sanctuary
- Gamble Garden
- Gulf St Vincent
- Heysen Walking Trails and other Walking Trails
- Society for Underwater Historical Research (2002 to 2012)
- Sporting Shooters Association of Australia's Conservation and wildlife management branch
- State Herbarium of South Australia

=== Gallery ===
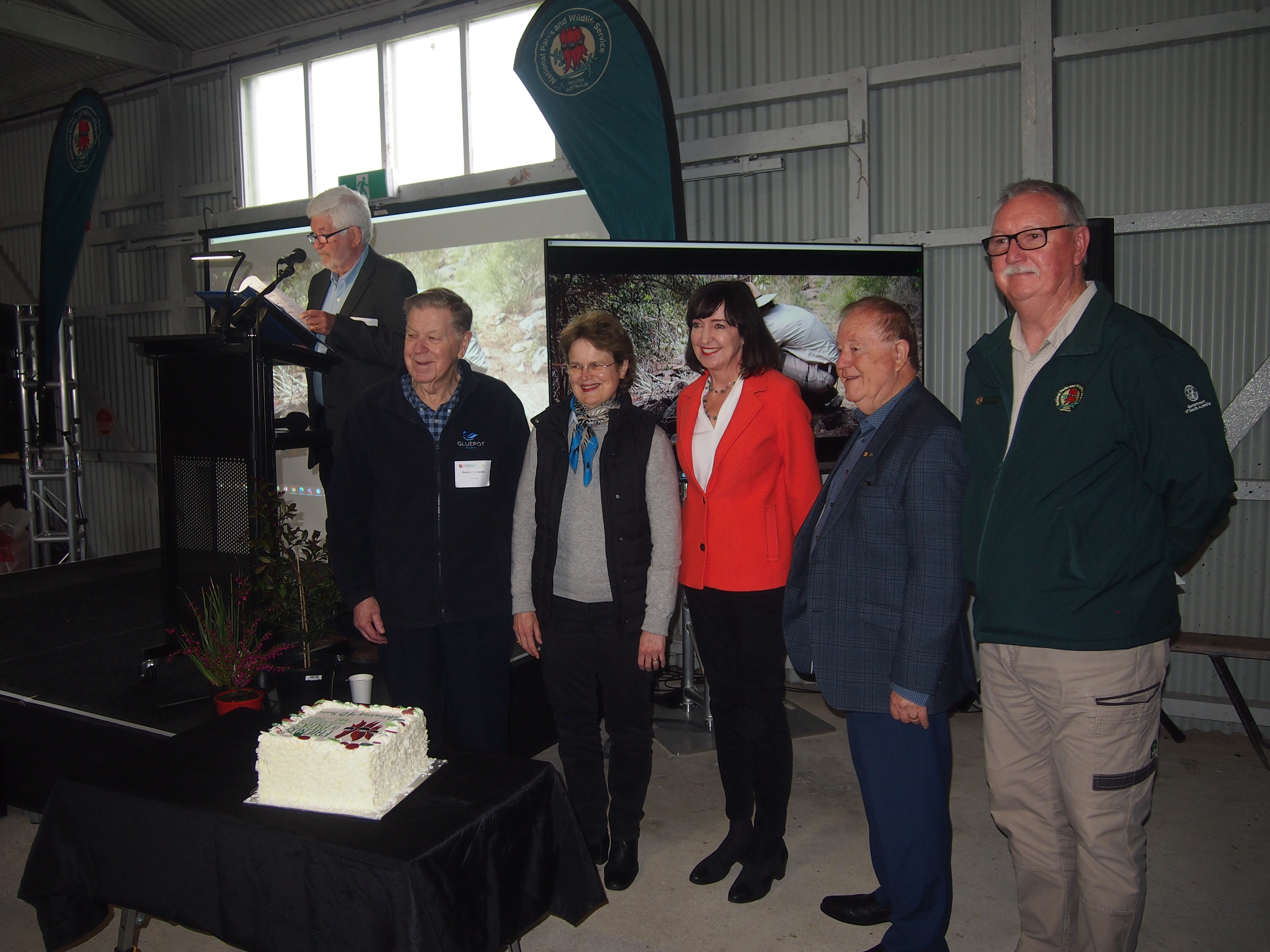
Dignitaries at the Friends of Parks 40th anniversary celebration at the Belair National Park,
25 September 2022.

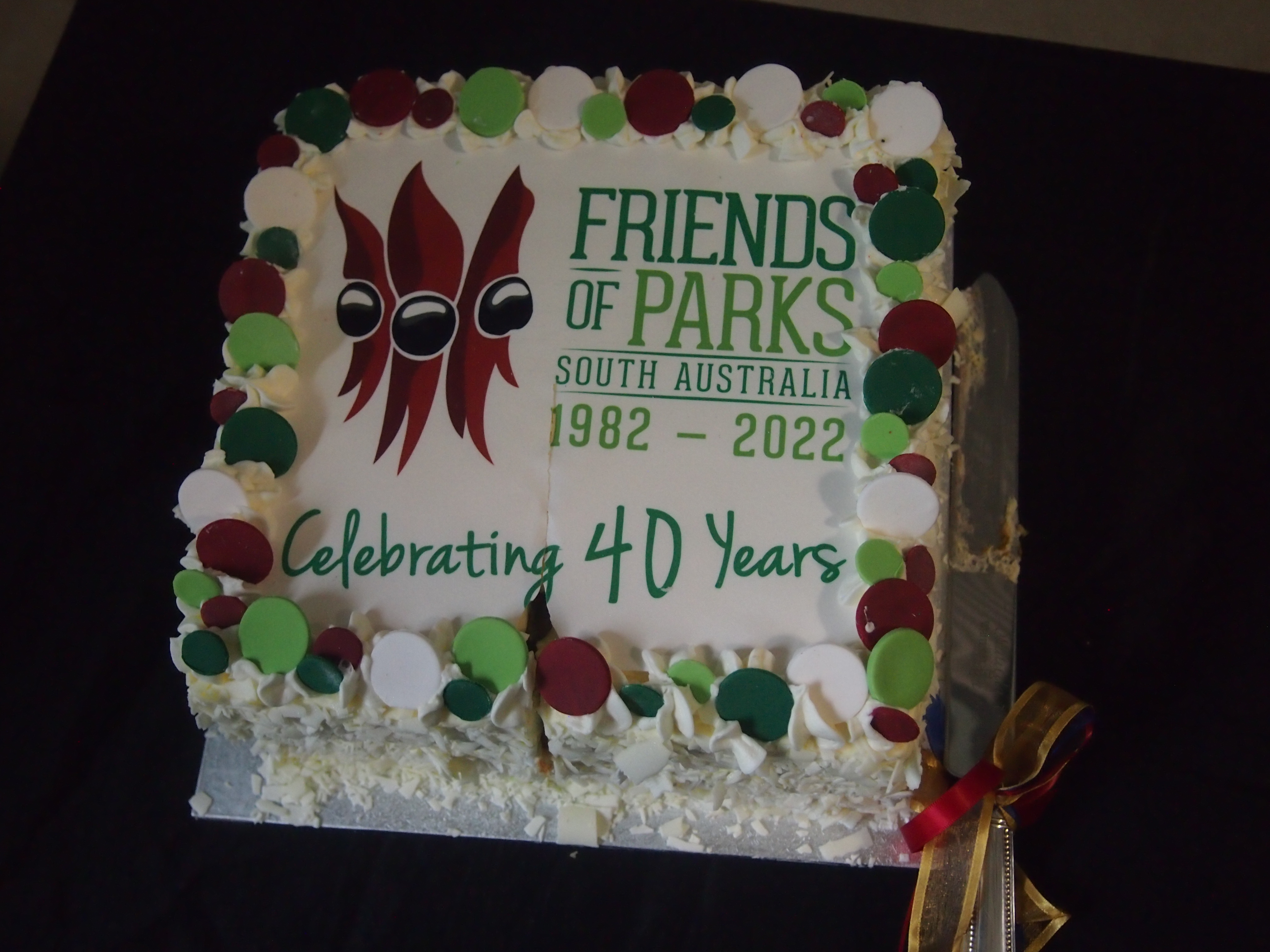
Friends of Parks 40th anniversary cake, 25 September 2022.

== See also ==
- Protected areas of South Australia
