= Port Noarlunga =

Port Noarlunga may refer to:

- Port Noarlunga, a former port associated with the current suburb of Port Noarlunga, South Australia
- Port Noarlunga Football Club, an Australian rules football club in South Australia
- Port Noarlunga South, South Australia, a suburb
- Port Noarlunga Reef, a reef located within the Port Noarlunga Reef Aquatic Reserve
- Port Noarlunga Reef Aquatic Reserve, a marine protected area in South Australia

== See also ==
- Noarlunga (disambiguation)
