= Morialta =

Morialta is a word derived from the Kaurna (Adelaide Plains Aboriginal) word mariyatala, with mari meaning east, and yertala meaning flowing water.

Morialta may refer to one of the following places in South Australia:

- Electoral district of Morialta, an electoral district
- Morialta Conservation Park, a protected area
- Morialta Secondary College, a public high school

== See also ==
- Norwood International High School, originally created from an amalgamation of Morialta High and Norwood High Schools
