= Parks and Wildlife Service =

Parks and Wildlife Service may refer to:

- Department of Parks and Wildlife, Western Australian government agency
- National Parks and Wildlife Service South Australia
- NSW National Parks & Wildlife Service
- Queensland Parks and Wildlife Service
- Tasmania Parks and Wildlife Service
