= Ferguson Conservation Park =

Protected area in South Australia

- IUCN category III (natural monument or feature)
- Location within South Australia
- Location: South Australia
- Nearest city: Adelaide city centre
- Coordinates: 34°55′52″S 138°40′13″E
- Area: 8 ha (20 acres)
- Established: 24 June 1949
- Visitors: 83 (per week) (in 1977)
- Governing body: Department for Environment and Water
- Website: Official website

Ferguson Conservation Park, formerly Ferguson National Pleasure Resort and Ferguson Recreation Park, is a protected area in the Australian state of South Australia located within the Adelaide metropolitan area in the suburb of Stonyfell, about 6.5 kilometres (4.0 miles) east of the Adelaide city centre.

The conservation park consists of land in section 687 (formerly part section 289) of the cadastral unit of the Hundred of Adelaide. It is bounded by St Peter's Collegiate Girls' School to the north-west, a private residence to the east, and by the following roads: Stonyfell Road to the north-east, Marble Terrace to the south and Hallett Road to the west.

The land which is occupied by the conservation park was originally donated to the Government of South Australia on 24 June 1949 by its previous owner, Alice Effie Ferguson, with the request that it be dedicated as a national pleasure resort “for the benefit of the public in perpetuity”. The national pleasure resort was managed by the South Australian Government Tourist Bureau until 27 April 1972 when the land was re-dedicated under the National Parks and Wildlife Act 1972 as the Ferguson Recreation Park. The recreation park was abolished on 24 June 1976 and then re-constituted as a conservation park, with the latter being dedicated on 2 June 1977 following the discovery of a procedural error. The land was part of a larger holding of which the remainder is now occupied by St Peter's Collegiate Girls' School.

The conservation park is classified as an IUCN Category III protected area. In 1980, the conservation park was listed on the former Register of the National Estate.

== See also ==
- List of protected areas in Adelaide
