= Moana Sands Conservation Park =

Protected area in South Australia

- IUCN category III (natural monument or feature)
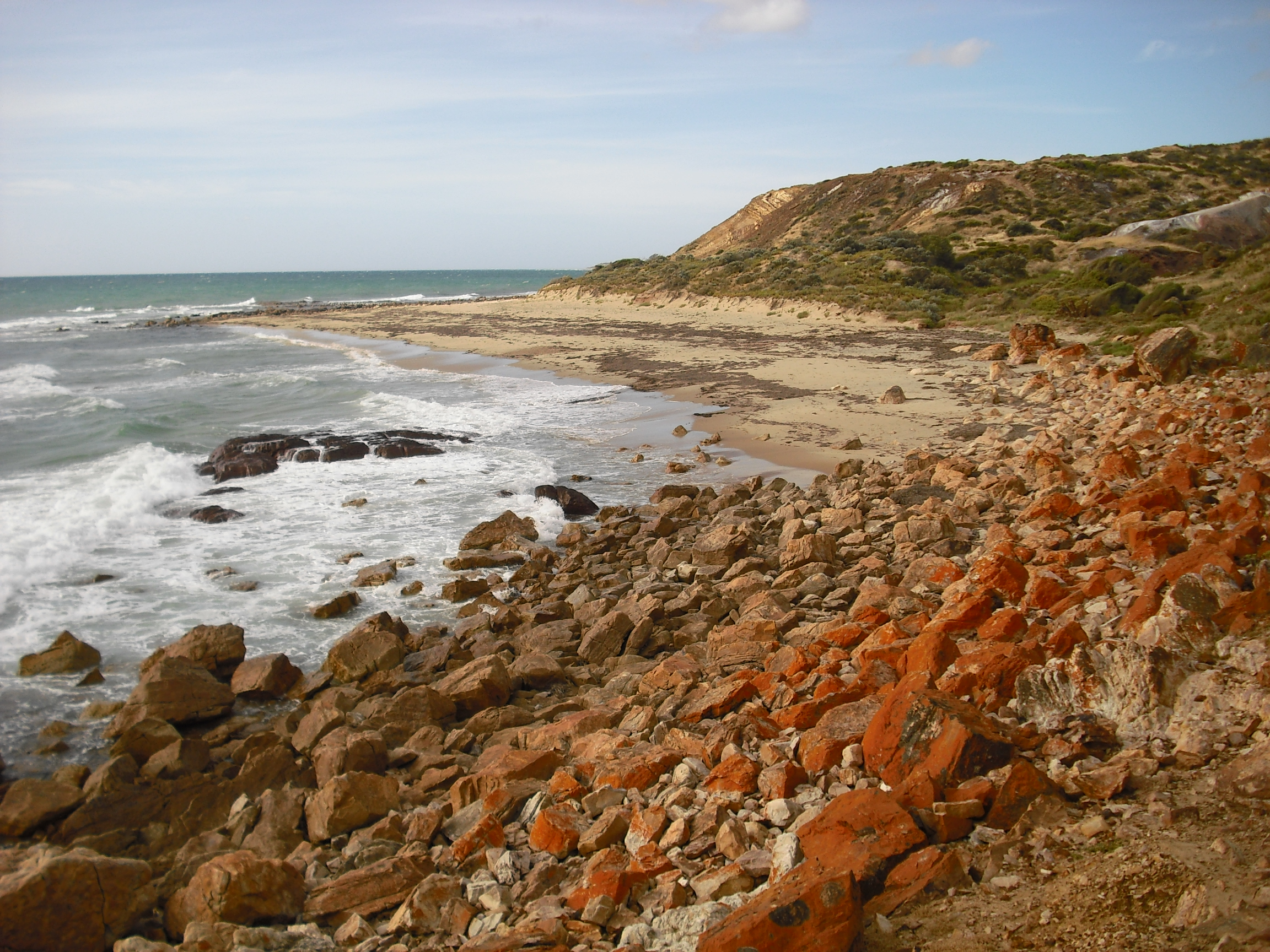
- Ochre Point

- Location within South Australia
- Location: South Australia
- Nearest city: Adelaide
- Coordinates: 35°12′9″S 138°28′22″E
- Area: 22 ha (54 acres)
- Established: 7 November 1985
- Governing body: Department of Environment, Water and Natural Resources
- Website: Official website

Moana Sands Conservation Park is a protected area located in the suburb of Moana in South Australia about 35 kilometres (22 miles) south of Adelaide. It was proclaimed under the National Parks and Wildlife Act 1972 in 1985 for the purpose of conserving a ‘significant Aboriginal cultural heritage site' associated with the Kaurna people.’ A statement of significance published after the park's dedication in 1985 advises: ‘prehistoric significance (aboriginal flakes, implements, evidence of burials)’ and ‘unusual red sands.’ The conservation park is classified as an IUCN Category III protected area.

== See also ==
- List of protected areas in Adelaide
