= Woorabinda Bushland Reserves =

Protected natural vegetation reserves in the Adelaide Hills

- Interactive map of Woorabinda Bushland Reserves
- Location: Stirling & Heathfield
- Coordinates: 35°00′55″S 138°42′48″E
- Area: 934 hectares (2,310 acres)
- Website: Friends of Woorabinda Bushland Reserves

Woorabinda Bushland Reserves, formerly known as the Stirling Linear Park, is a 34 ha network of four parks and reserves located in the suburbs of Stirling and Heathfield in the Mount Lofty Ranges, South Australia. The parks are part of the Aldgate Creek catchment which feeds into the Onkaparinga River. 4 km of walking trails connect Stirling Park and Woorabinda to Madurta and Hender Reserves, all of which are open to the general public. The parks contain notable natural and early European heritage value and a network of interpretive signage provides information to park visitors.

== Conservation ==
The park contains native flora and fauna of conservation significance, 20 ha of bushland and several resident threatened species. Colonies of the nationally endangered Southern brown bandicoot exist in the park, as do over 12 species of conservation listed plants. The creek contains native fish such as Mountain galaxias (state-listed as Rare) and the wetland supports native Eastern long-necked turtles and native water rats. 47% of the declining birds of the greater Mt Lofty Ranges have been observed in the park.

== History ==
=== Stirling Park ===
Stirling Park was previously known as 'Halliday's Gully' and was owned by the Halliday family from 1855 to about 1930. The Hallidays farmed the land as a market garden.

=== Woorabinda ===
In 1922, the South Australian Railways needed a permanent source of fresh water to service steam locomotives at the Aldgate station. Land was purchased from the Hallidays, and a depression at the confluence of two streams was excavated to function as a large dam. It became known as Woorabinda Lake. The area was used as a camp site for disadvantaged families from 1960 to the mid 1990s. It was transferred into public ownership in the 1970s. Threatened by the encroachment of private development, the area was defended by local residents and in 1995 Stirling Council purchased the site. A vision to restore the site to a 'natural bush setting' is in place, and volunteer revegetation work is ongoing. Woorabinda Lake is a popular nesting site for many waterfowl, and several outdoor seats and a bird hide afford bird-watching vantage points. Woorabinda is considered a high biodiversity area.

=== Madurta Reserve ===
In 1972 Madurta Reserve was created for the preservation of open space. Local volunteers have helped with tree planting works in the reserve since 1983. Prior to 1972, the Madurta Creek and adjacent areas were used for the grazing of cattle. As of July 2011, the reserve is divided into three 'precincts' for the purpose of biodiversity assessment. The two larger precincts were both assessed to have 'high' biodiversity value, while the remaining smaller precinct was considered 'moderate'.

=== Hender Reserve ===
This park is located west of Woorabinda and the two parks are connected via a pedestrian railway crossing. It contains some of the district's largest and oldest stringybark eucalypts. It was proclaimed as a large public reserve in 1879, but is now only a fraction of its former size. All three precincts of Hender Reserve are considered to have high biodiversity value.

== Access ==
There are twelve different points of entry to the Woorabinda Bushland Reserves with limited car parking available at many of them. Dog walking in the parks is permitted, but dogs must be kept on leads less than 2 m in length at all times. Popular activities in the park include walking, picnicking, bird watching and wetland study.

== Management ==
Woorabinda Bushland Reserves are owned and managed by the Adelaide Hills Council.

=== Friends of Woorabinda Bushland Reserves ===
The Friends of Worrabinda Bushland Reserves (formerly the Friends of Stirling Linear Park) are a member group of Friends of Parks Inc. The group's volunteer members assist with land care projects and the development of information and signage for visitors to the park. As at February 2014, the Friends' patron is Chris Daniels, Professor of Urban Ecology at the University of South Australia and presiding member of the Adelaide & Mount Lofty Ranges Natural Resources Management Board. The Friends' first patron was Anita Aspinall AM, a former president of the National Trust of South Australia, who supported the Friends of Stirling Linear Park for close to 25 years. Aspinall played a pivotal role in the acquisition and protection of Woorabinda.
