= Port Noarlunga Reef Aquatic Reserve =

Protected area in South Australia

- IUCN category VI (protected area with sustainable use of natural resources)
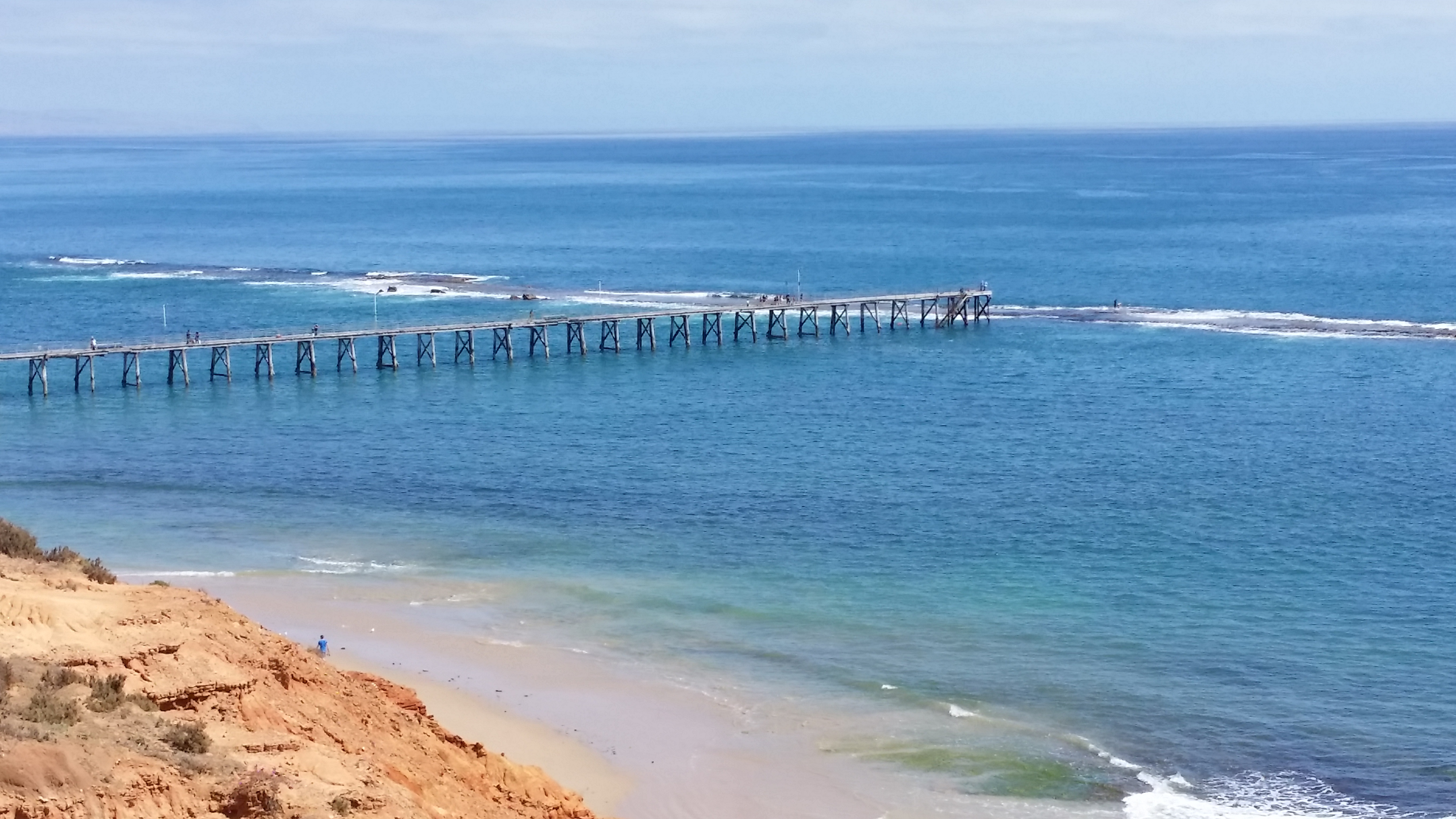
- Port Noarlunga Jetty and the submerged Port Noarlunga Reef

- Location within South Australia
- Location: South Australia
- Nearest city: Christies Beach; Port Noarlunga; Port Noarlunga South; Noarlunga Downs; Seaford Meadows; Seaford
- Coordinates: 35.2702°S 138.4619°E
- Area: 5.79 km^{2} (2.24 sq mi)
- Established: 1 December 1971
- Visitors: 170,000 (in 1987)
- Governing body: Primary Industries and Regions SA (PIRSA)

Port Noarlunga Reef Aquatic Reserve is a marine protected area in the Australian state of South Australia located in waters in Gulf St Vincent adjoining the Adelaide metropolitan area and including part of the Onkaparinga River about 28 kilometres (17 mi) south-west of the state capital of Adelaide.

As of 2016, the aquatic reserve extends seaward for a distance of about 1.75 kilometres (1.09 miles) from Gulfview Road in the suburb of Christies Beach in the north with its seaward boundary finishing in the south at the shoreline near the west end of Helmsman Terrace in the suburb of Seaford and includes the full extent of the Onkaparinga River from its mouth to the bridge on the South Road in the suburbs of Noarlunga Downs and Seaford Meadows.

The portion of the aquatic reserve located within Gulf St Vincent includes two reef systems that are exposed at low tide - the Horseshoe Reef located off the coast at Christies Beach and the Port Noarlunga Reef located off the coast at Port Noarlunga. The Port Noarlunga Reef is connected to the shore by a jetty.

The aquatic reserve was declared on 30 November 1971 to protect “reef organisms from exploitation and for the conservation of the estuary and swamps of the lower Onkaparinga River, for the purposes of recreation and education”.

The aquatic reserve is classified as an IUCN Category VI protected area.

== Fishing activity ==
Fishing activity is limited to the use of rod and handline except for the waters within 25 metres (82 feet) of Horseshoe Reef and can only be carried out at Port Noarlunga from the beach and the jetty to within 50 metres (160 feet) of the Port Noarlunga Reef. The use of "hand nets for the taking of shrimps for bait only" is permitted in estuary and the Onkaparinga River.

Concerns have arisen at various times regarding the potential impacts of illegal fishing within the aquatic reserve.

== Underwater trail ==
In 1994, the South Australian Research and Development Institute installed an “underwater interpretation trail” in order to “raise community awareness of temperate reef environments and marine life”. The trail which covers a distance of 800 metres (2,600 ft) consists of 12 concrete plinths installed on the seabed and each fitted with a plaque providing information about the reef’s sub-tidal flora and fauna. The trail which starts at the jetty heads south on the east side of the reef and passes through a passage in the reef known as The Gap and then heads north on the west side of the reef to a point opposite the end of the jetty.

== Encounter Marine Park ==
Since 2012, its full extent has been located within the boundaries of the protected area known as the Encounter Marine Park and is fully occupied by four "habitat protection zones" and two "sanctuary zones" including one extending along the coastline from Witton Bluff in the north and Onkaparinga Head in the south.

== See also ==
- Protected areas of South Australia
- List of protected areas in Adelaide
- Onkaparinga River Recreation Park
