= Black Hill Conservation Park =

National park in South Australia

- IUCN category III (natural monument or feature)
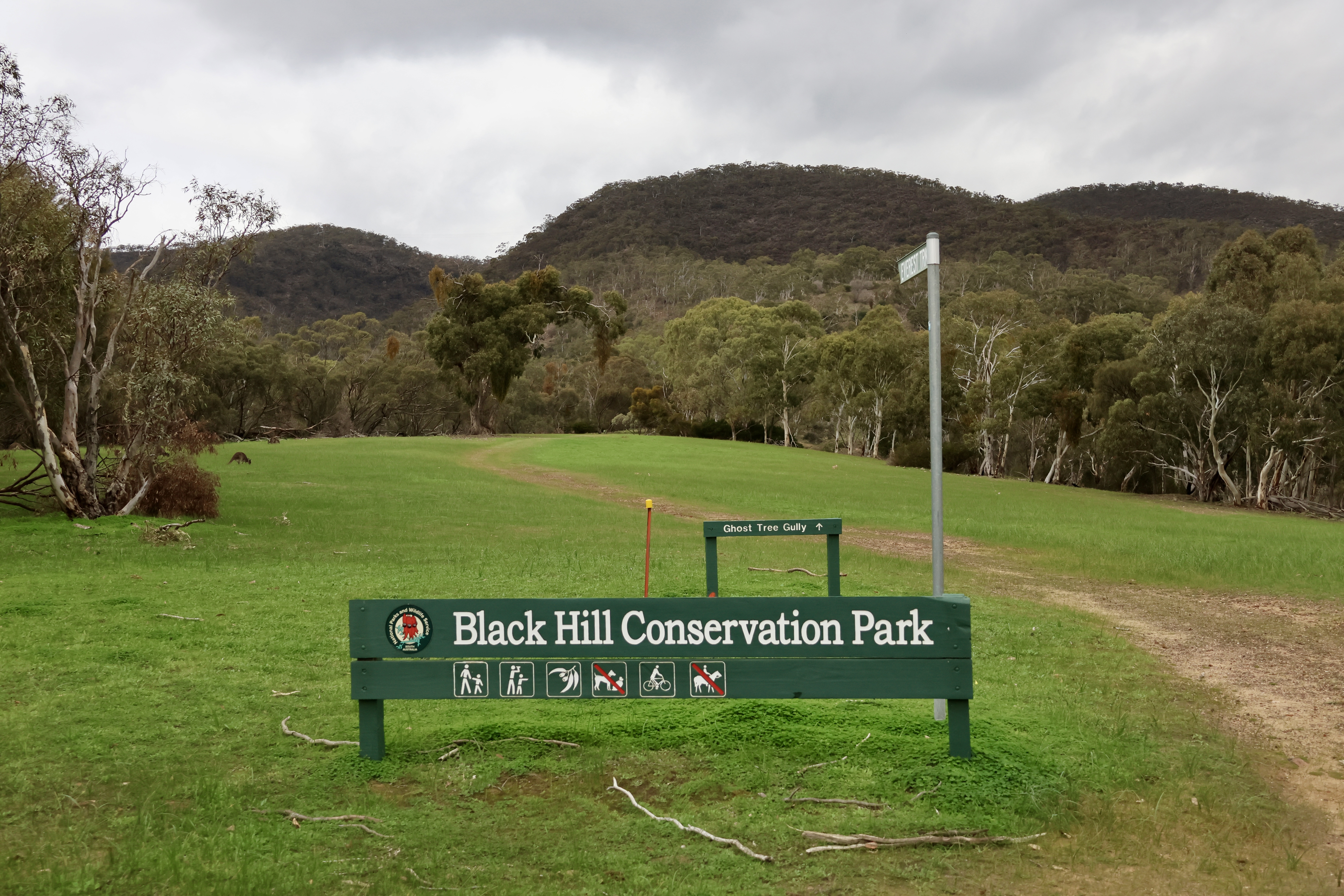
- Access track in Black Hill Conservation Park

- Location within South Australia
- Location: South Australia, Athelstone and Montacute
- Nearest city: Adelaide
- Coordinates: 34°52′34″S 138°43′23″E
- Area: 7.58 km^{2} (2.93 sq mi)
- Established: 27 January 1972
- Governing body: Department for Environment and Water
- Website: http://www.environment.sa.gov.au/parks/Find_a_Park/Browse_by_region/Adelaide_Hills/Black_Hill_Conservation_Park

Black Hill Conservation Park, formerly the Black Hill National Park, is a protected area in the Australian state of South Australia located approximately 10 kilometres (6.2 mi) northeast of the state capital of Adelaide. With its close proximity to the city and extensive network of hiking trails, this park is a popular site for bushwalkers from suburban Adelaide. Black Hill Summit is the highest point in the park (467m), bound by steep ridges on both the northern and southern slopes.

The name "Black Hill" originally comes from the dark colour of she-oaks (Allocasuarina sp.) that cover much of the park.

== Geography and climate ==
Black Hill Conservation Park covers around 7.58 square kilometres (2.93 sq mi) within the Mount Lofty Ranges, which run north–south to the east of Adelaide's coastal plain.

It is adjacent to the suburbs of Athelstone and Montacute and is bounded to the north by Gorge Road and to the south by Montacute Road. The conservation park lies mostly on the northern side of Fifth Creek. It is directly to the north of Morialta Conservation Park, forming a contiguous region with shared floristic, geological and climactic features.

While the park can be accessed through a multitude of smaller entrances within both Athelstone and Montacute, the primary vehicle entrance and carpark is located at the end of Addison Avenue.

Black Hill Conservation Park shares Adelaide's Mediterranean climate, with average temperatures of 17 °C (63 °F) in winter, to 28 °C (82 °F) during summer. The conservation park receives average annual rainfall of 800 millimetres (31 in) mostly between May and September. During the summer months (December to February) temperatures can rise above 40 °C (104 °F).

The conservation park is classified as an IUCN Category III protected area.

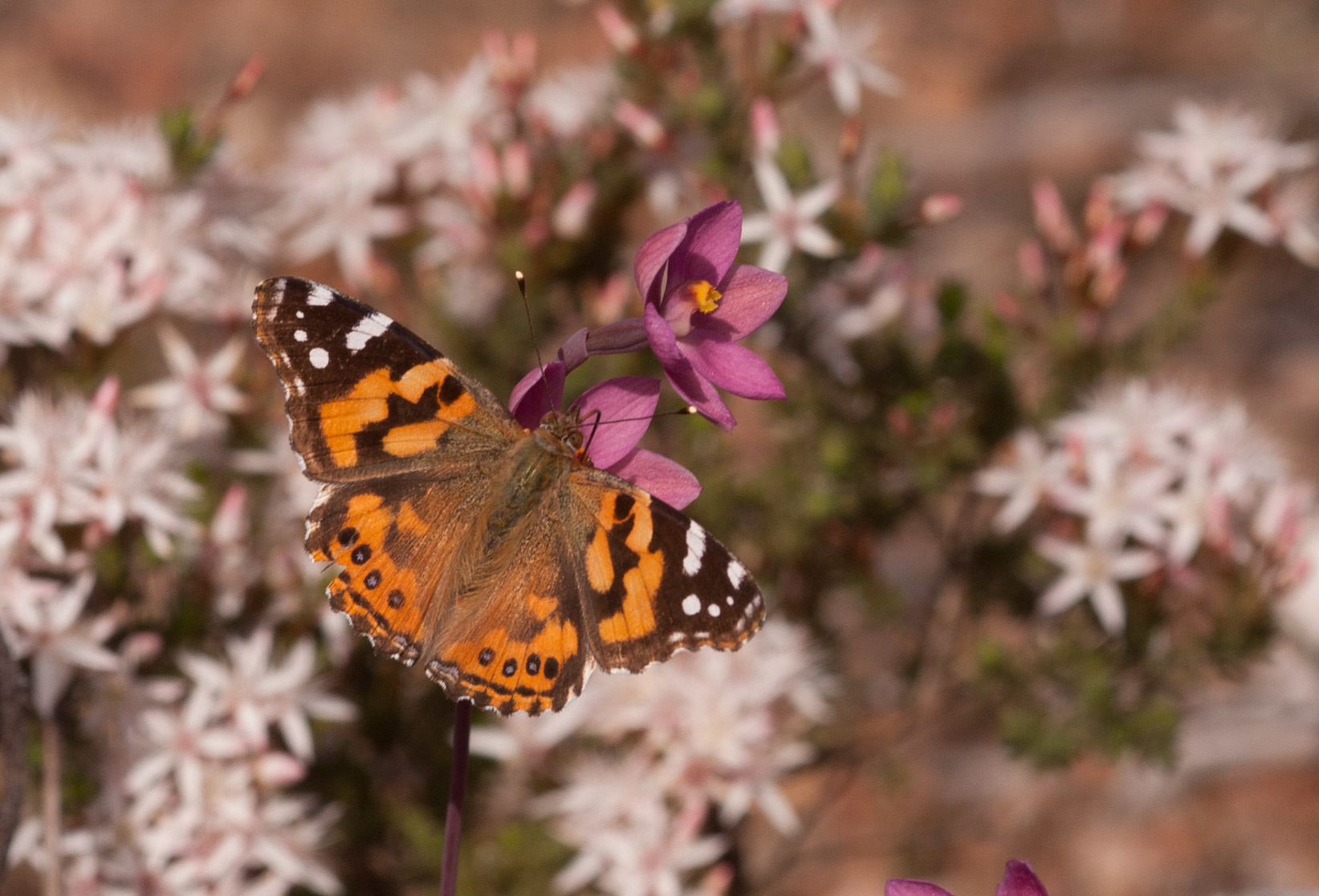
A native Australian painted lady butterfly feeding from a salmon sun-orchid within the park

== History ==
The land first received protected area status as the Black Hill National Park proclaimed on 27 January 1972 under the National Parks Act 1966 in respect to land in sections 669, 670 and 671 of the cadastral unit of the Hundred of Adelaide and section 526 of the Hundred of Onkaparinga. On 27 April 1972, the national park was reconstituted as the Black Hill Conservation Park under the National Parks and Wildlife Act 1972. As of 2019, it covered an area of 7.58 square kilometres (2.93 sq mi).

In 1982, it was listed on the now-defunct Register of the National Estate.

== Activities ==
The conservation park caters for a variety of activities, including bushwalking, picnics and bird watching. There are a wide variety of walking paths, exploring the various peaks and valleys within the conservation park. The reserve is also bisected by two long-distance routes, the Yurrebilla and Heysen Trails. The Yurrebilla trail typically finishes within the park, at the outflow of Amber's Gully.

Being only 10 kilometres (6.2 mi) from the centre of Adelaide, Black Hill is an accessible but often overlooked conservation park area. There are picnic grounds near the conservation park's Administration buildings and this area links in with the Athelstone oval and Wadmore Park, a Campbelltown City Council reserve.

== Prior use of the land ==
The Adelaide Plains, which includes Black Hill Conservation Park, was traditionally occupied by the Kaurna people. Most of the Kaurna elders died before much of their culture could be recorded, and so little is known of the pre-colonial history of the area. It is known that they used fire both as an aid to hunting, and to regenerate the vegetation.

In the south-east of the park is the landscaped Wildflower Garden. Initially developed in the 1940s as a nursery for native flora, the site was purchased by the City of Campbelltown in 1963 and subsequently sold to the State Government in 1974. Shortly after this in 1976 the disease Phytophthora cinnamoni was detected in the soil, causing the nursery to close. As it is not possible to remove Phytophthora cinnamoni once it has infested the soil, it remains to this day. The Friends of the Black Hill and Morialta Conservation Parks make use of building on site where meetings are held and activities are based/conducted for help with the wildflower garden and the two conservation parks.

== Flora and Fauna ==
The high quality heathland contained within the park provides habitat for a wide variety of species, including the endangered Mount Lofty Ranges Chestnut-rumped heathwren.

== See also ==
- List of protected areas in Adelaide
- Morialta Conservation Park
