= Noarlunga Centre, South Australia =

Noarlunga Centre
- Suburb
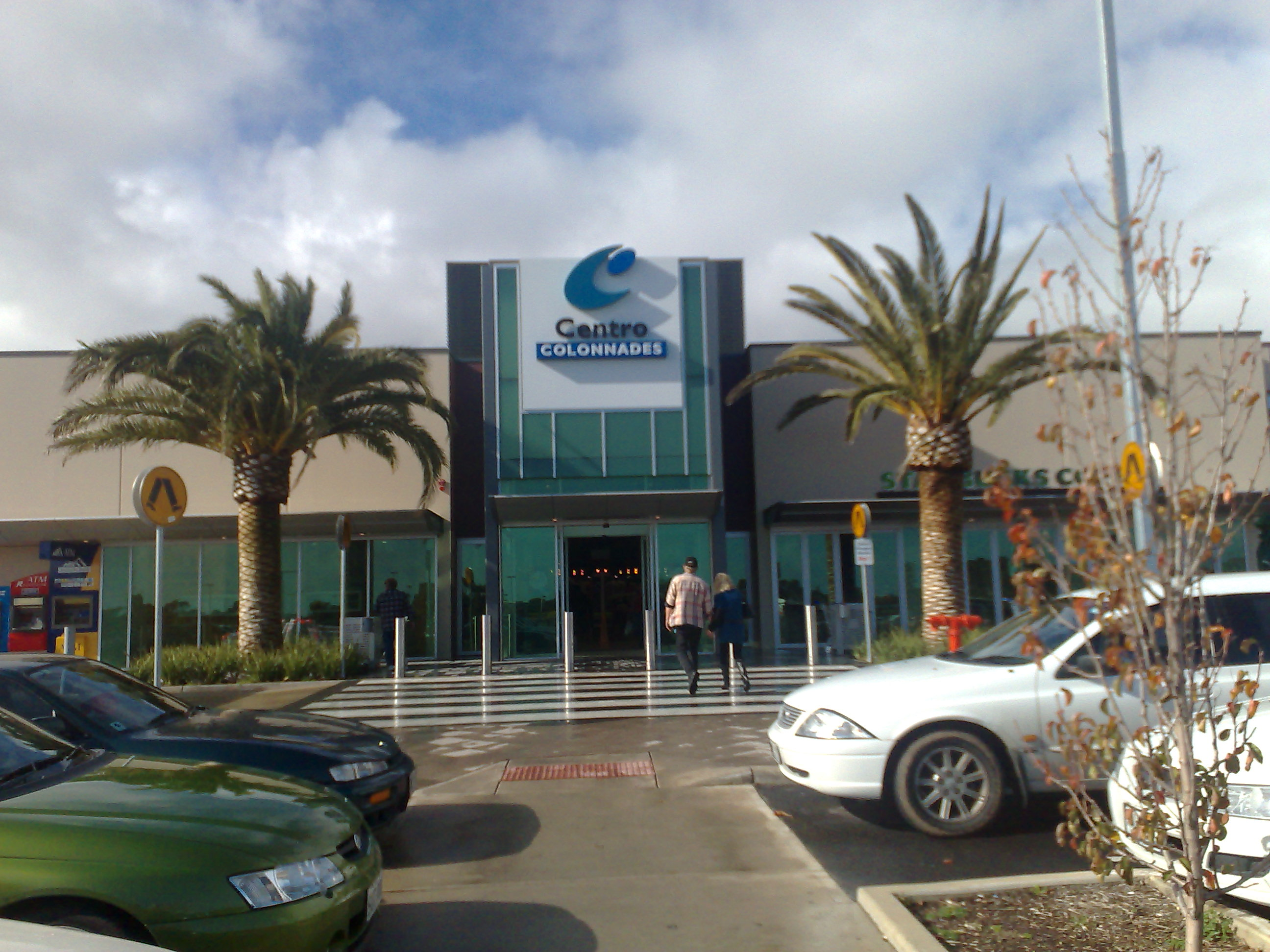
- Centro Colonnades

- Coordinates: 35.140°S 138.493°E
- Country: Australia
- State: South Australia
- Region: Southern Adelaide
- City: Adelaide
- LGA: City of Onkaparinga
- Location: 25 km (16 mi) from Adelaide
- Established: 1978

Government
  - State electorate: Reynell
  - Federal division: Kingston

Population
  - Total: 203 (SAL 2016)
- Postcode: 5168
- County: Adelaide
Suburbs around Noarlunga Centre
Lonsdale	Lonsdale	Morphett Vale
Christies Beach	Noarlunga Centre	Hackham West
Port Noarlunga	Noarlunga Downs	Hackham West

Noarlunga Centre is a suburb in the City of Onkaparinga in the southern suburbs of Adelaide, South Australia. The suburb is mostly commercial, being dominated by the Centro Colonnades shopping centre and the small 'Inspire Noarlunga' estate to the east of Goldsmith Road. The suburb is bordered by Beach Road to the north, Dyson Road to the west, Goldsmith Road to the south and the Southern Expressway to the east. Burgess Drive, Seaman Road and David Witton Drive are the main thoroughfares inside the boundaries of the suburb.

The name Noarlunga is an English adaptation of the native Kaurna word Nurlongga, meaning 'at the curvature', referring to the horseshoe bend near the mouth of the Onkaparinga River.

Sharing the name Noarlunga are the two adjacent seaside suburbs, Port Noarlunga and Port Noarlunga South, together with the historic township of Old Noarlunga that is located on the Onkaparinga River.

Port Noarlunga was the original town centre prior to Noarlunga Centre being constructed.

Noarlunga English adaptation of the kaurna name has also been spelt as Nglungga.

== Facilities ==
Noarlunga Centre is home of many facilities. The Onkaparinga Council headquarters, Noarlunga TAFE, the Hopgood Theatre, the Noarlunga Library and Noarlunga Hospital are all located in this area, as well as a 5 screen Wallis Cinema, a bowling alley, a swimming centre, 24-hour BodySmith fitness centre, as well as a multi-sport venue. The number of retailers in this area is large, with over 200 residing in Centro Colonnades, as well as a few on Dyson Road, and a number in the area just behind this. Health : Noarlunga Centre is also home to the Noarlunga Hospital, a 108-bed regional health service. Noarlunga Hospital was established in 1985 as a regional community health service.

== Transport ==
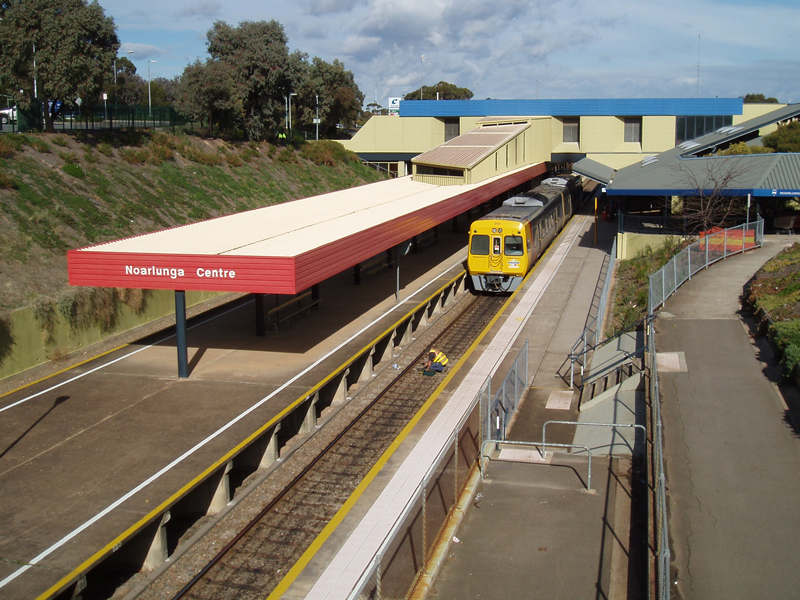
Noarlunga Centre railway station

In Noarlunga Centre, just near Colonnades Shopping Centre, is Noarlunga Centre railway station, providing numerous bus links to anywhere in the metro area, and a train station, to get to Adelaide by rail. The Southern Expressway also has an on/off ramp located in Noarlunga. The expressway was recently widened.

City buses from the station interchange and centro colonnades are routes: 721, T721, 722, T722, 723.

== Climate ==
Noarlunga has a hot mediterranean climate (Köppen: Csa); with very warm, dry summers and mild, somewhat rainy winters. Temperatures vary from season to season: with average maxima between 28.8 °C (83.8 °F) in January to 14.9 °C (58.8 °F) in July; and average minima between 17.2 °C (63.0 °F) in January to 8.7 °C (47.7 °F) in July. Annual precipitation is somewhat low: averaging 341.0 mm (13.43 in), between 123.1 precipitation days- primarily concentrated in winter. Extreme temperatures have ranged from 46.2 °C (115.2 °F) on the 24th of January 2019 to 1.8 °C (35.2 °F) on the 5th of August 2020.

Climate data for Noarlunga (35º09'36"S, 138º30'36"E, 55 m AMSL) (2000-2024 normals and extremes)
Month	Jan	Feb	Mar	Apr	May	Jun	Jul	Aug	Sep	Oct	Nov	Dec	Year
Record high °C (°F)	46.2 (115.2)	43.4 (110.1)	40.0 (104.0)	35.4 (95.7)	29.2 (84.6)	25.1 (77.2)	22.1 (71.8)	27.3 (81.1)	31.5 (88.7)	37.4 (99.3)	41.8 (107.2)	43.4 (110.1)	46.2 (115.2)
Mean daily maximum °C (°F)	28.8 (83.8)	27.7 (81.9)	25.8 (78.4)	22.4 (72.3)	18.4 (65.1)	15.6 (60.1)	14.9 (58.8)	15.9 (60.6)	18.7 (65.7)	21.4 (70.5)	24.6 (76.3)	26.5 (79.7)	21.7 (71.1)
Mean daily minimum °C (°F)	17.2 (63.0)	16.8 (62.2)	15.7 (60.3)	13.6 (56.5)	11.4 (52.5)	9.3 (48.7)	8.7 (47.7)	8.9 (48.0)	10.3 (50.5)	11.6 (52.9)	13.9 (57.0)	15.4 (59.7)	12.7 (54.9)
Record low °C (°F)	10.0 (50.0)	9.0 (48.2)	9.0 (48.2)	5.9 (42.6)	4.4 (39.9)	2.0 (35.6)	2.2 (36.0)	1.8 (35.2)	3.5 (38.3)	4.0 (39.2)	6.0 (42.8)	7.6 (45.7)	1.8 (35.2)
Average precipitation mm (inches)	17.6 (0.69)	17.9 (0.70)	18.0 (0.71)	32.5 (1.28)	54.0 (2.13)	66.2 (2.61)	60.6 (2.39)	54.6 (2.15)	43.7 (1.72)	32.0 (1.26)	24.7 (0.97)	22.4 (0.88)	441.0 (17.36)
Average precipitation days (≥ 0.2 mm)	4.6	3.7	5.6	8.3	13.7	15.7	17.0	16.3	13.4	9.4	7.9	7.5	123.1
Average afternoon relative humidity (%)	38	41	41	48	58	65	65	60	57	49	43	42	51
Average dew point °C (°F)	9.4 (48.9)	10.2 (50.4)	8.7 (47.7)	8.4 (47.1)	8.6 (47.5)	7.8 (46.0)	7.2 (45.0)	6.5 (43.7)	7.1 (44.8)	6.5 (43.7)	7.9 (46.2)	8.4 (47.1)	8.1 (46.5)
Source: Bureau of Meteorology (2000-2024 normals and extremes)

== See also ==
- Noarlunga (disambiguation)
- History of Adelaide
- European settlement of South Australia
