= Blackwood Forest Recreation Park =

Protected area in South Australia

- IUCN category III (natural monument or feature)
- Location within South Australia
- Location: South Australia
- Nearest city: Adelaide city centre
- Coordinates: 35°1′42.6″S 138°37′42.96″E
- Area: 21 ha (52 acres)
- Established: 1 November 2001
- Governing body: Department for Environment and Water

Blackwood Forest Recreation Park is a protected area located about 12 kilometres (7.5 miles) south of the Adelaide city centre in the suburb of Hawthorndene. The recreation park was proclaimed under the National Parks and Wildlife Act 1972 in 2001 to retain land purchased in 1908 by the Government of South Australia for use as open space for recreational purposes. The recreation park is classified as an IUCN Category III protected area.

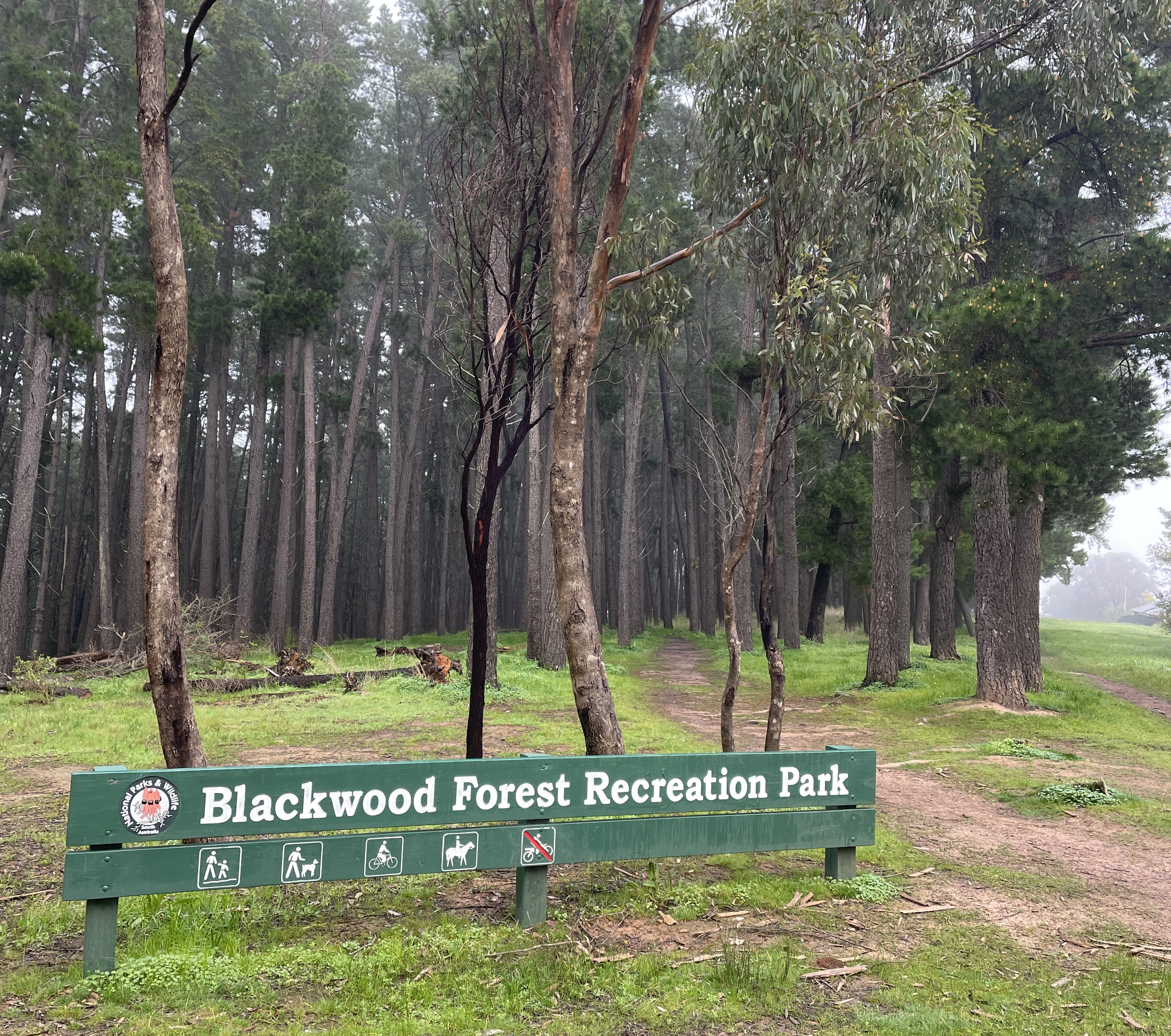
Blackwood Forest Recreational Park at the north east corner, in August 2022

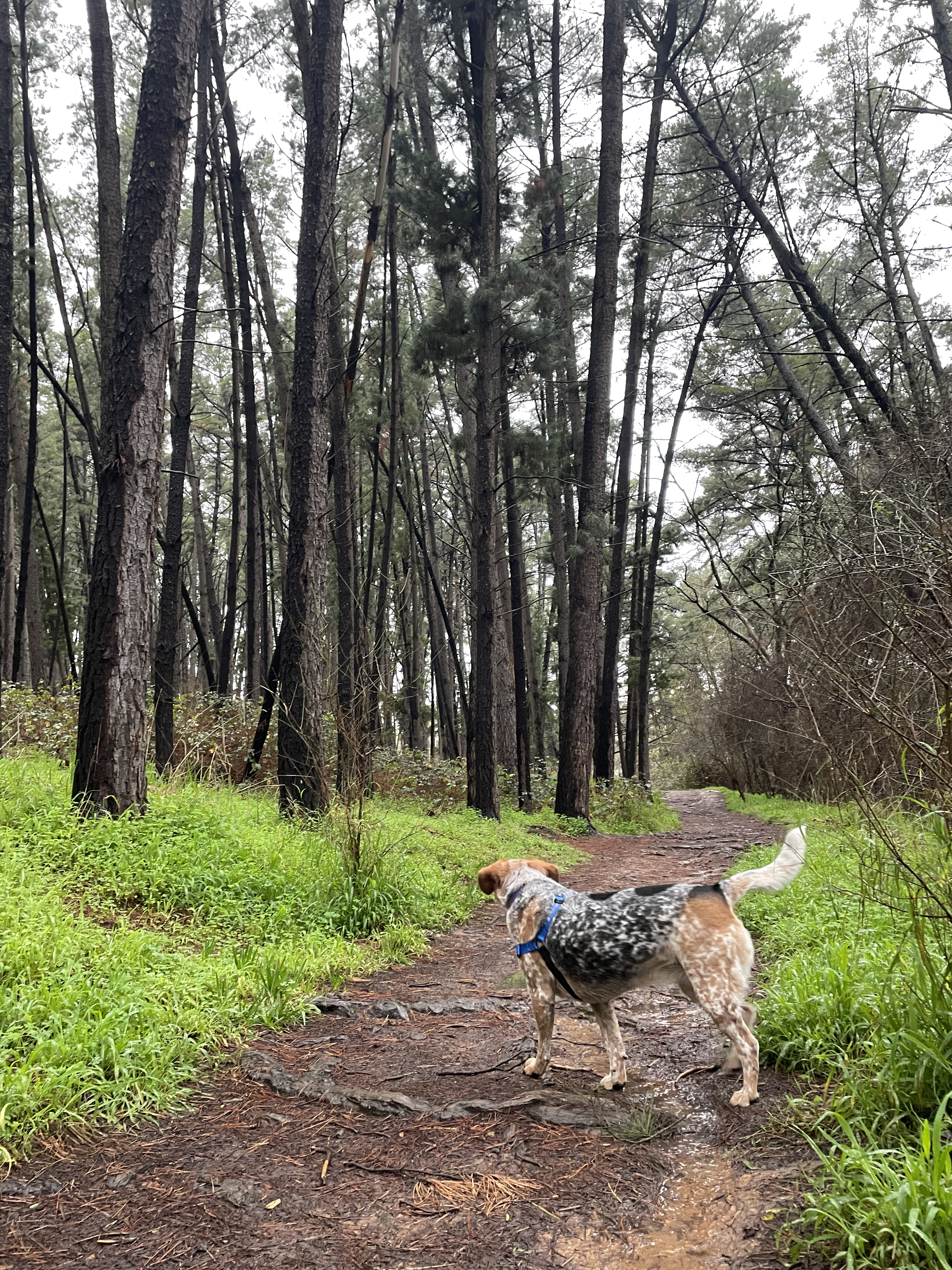
Blackwood Forest is the only national park in South Australia in which you can exercise your dog off a lead.

== See also ==
- List of protected areas in Adelaide
