= Angove Conservation Park =

Protected area in South Australia

- IUCN category III (natural monument or feature)
- Location within South Australia
- Location: South Australia
- Nearest city: Adelaide city centre
- Coordinates: 34°49′27.8″S 138°43′23.1″E
- Area: 5 ha (12 acres)
- Established: 23 June 1994
- Governing body: Department for Environment and Water
- Website: http://www.environment.sa.gov.au/parks/Find_a_Park/Browse_by_region/Adelaide_Hills/Angove_Conservation_Park

Angove Conservation Park is a protected area located about 16 kilometres (9.9 miles) north-east of the Adelaide city centre within the local government area of the City of Tea Tree Gully. The conservation park was proclaimed under the National Parks and Wildlife Act 1972 in 1994 to protect a parcel of undeveloped land which contained remnant native vegetation. The conservation park is classified as an IUCN Category III protected area.

== See also ==
- List of protected areas in Adelaide
