= Shepherds Hill Recreation Park =

Protected area in South Australia

- IUCN category III (natural monument or feature)
- Location within South Australia
- Location: South Australia
- Nearest city: Adelaide city centre
- Coordinates: 35°0′56.15″S 138°35′12.48″E
- Area: 77 ha (190 acres)
- Established: 1 January 1955
- Governing body: Department for Environment and Water
- Website: Official website

Shepherds Hill Recreation Park is a protected area located about 9 kilometres (5.6 miles) south of the Adelaide city centre in the local government area known as the City of Mitcham. The recreation park was proclaimed under the National Parks and Wildlife Act 1972 in 1972 for a parcel of land formerly known as St Marys Reserve and which was acquired by the Government of South Australia in 1953 as "public open-space for recreation purposes" and "managed by the South Australian Government Tourist Bureau as a dedicated National Pleasure Resort from 1955 until 1972". The recreation park is classified as an IUCN Category III protected area.

== See also ==
- List of protected areas in Adelaide
