= List of protected areas in Adelaide =

Adelaide's metropolitan area showing some of the protected areas listed in the article

List of protected areas in Adelaide refers to protected areas proclaimed by South Australian government which are located within the Adelaide metropolitan area.

== Northern Adelaide ==
The following protected areas are located within the South Australian government region known as Northern Adelaide.

- Adelaide Dolphin Sanctuary (part)
- Adelaide International Bird Sanctuary National Park—Winaityinaityi Pangkara
- Angove Conservation Park
- Anstey Hill Recreation Park
- Barker Inlet-St Kilda Aquatic Reserve
- Cobbler Creek Recreation Park
- Folland Park
- Para Wirra Conservation Park
- St Kilda – Chapman Creek Aquatic Reserve

== Western Adelaide ==
The following protected areas are located within the South Australian government region known as Western Adelaide.

- Adelaide Dolphin Sanctuary (part)
- Fort Glanville Conservation Park
- Tennyson Dunes Conservation Reserve
- Torrens Island Conservation Park

== Eastern Adelaide ==
The following protected areas are located within the South Australian government region known as Eastern Adelaide.

- Black Hill Conservation Park (part)
- Cleland National Park (part)
- Ferguson Conservation Park

== Southern Adelaide ==
The following protected areas are located within the South Australian government region known as Southern Adelaide.

- Aldinga Reef Aquatic Reserve
- Aldinga Scrub Conservation Park
- Belair National Park
- Blackwood Forest Recreation Park
- Brownhill Creek Recreation Park
- Encounter Marine Park
- Hallett Cove Conservation Park
- Marino Conservation Park
- Moana Sands Conservation Park
- Onkaparinga River National Park
- Onkaparinga River Recreation Park
- O'Halloran Hill Recreation Park
- Port Noarlunga Reef Aquatic Reserve
- Scott Creek Conservation Park (part)
- Shepherds Hill Recreation Park
- Sturt Gorge Recreation Park

== See also ==
- Protected areas of South Australia
- List of Adelaide parks and gardens
