= Port Noarlunga, South Australia =

Coastal suburb of Adelaide, South Australia

Port Noarlunga
- Suburb
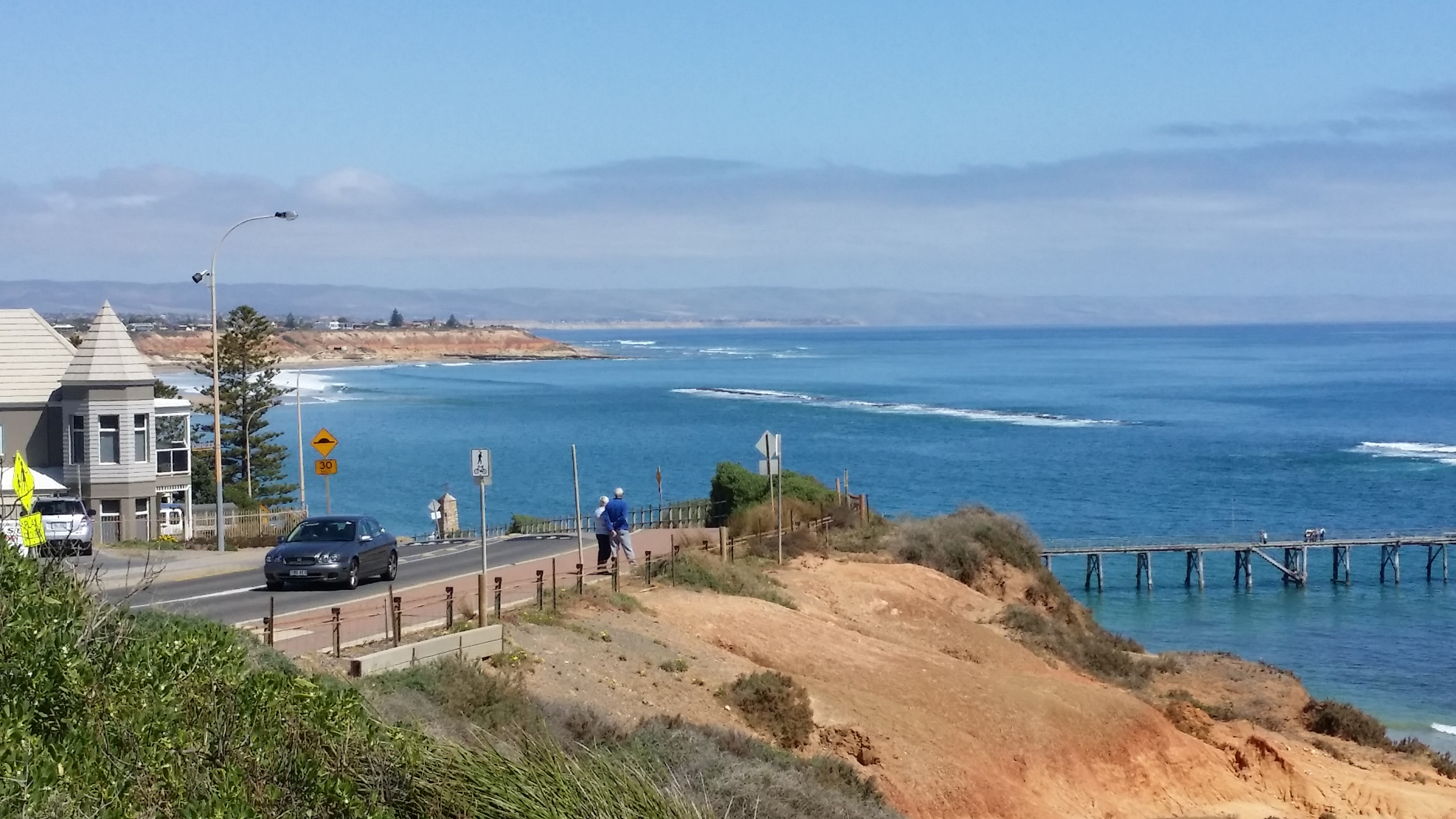
- Port Noarlunga jetty and reef, viewed from Witton Bluff

- Coordinates: 35°08′56″S 138°28′31″E
- Country: Australia
- State: South Australia
- Region: Southern Adelaide
- City: Adelaide
- LGA: City of Onkaparinga
- Location: 27 km (17 mi) south of Adelaide
- Established: 1856

Government
  - State electorate: Reynell
  - Federal division: Kingston

Population
  - Total: 3,245 (SAL 2021)
- Postcode: 5167
- County: Adelaide
- Mean max temp: 21.7 °C (71.1 °F)
- Mean min temp: 12.8 °C (55.0 °F)
- Annual rainfall: 448.7 mm (17.67 in)
Suburbs around Port Noarlunga
Gulf St Vincent	Christies Beach	Noarlunga Centre
Gulf St Vincent	Port Noarlunga	Noarlunga Downs
Gulf St Vincent	Port Noarlunga South	Seaford Meadows
- Location; Climate; Adjoining suburbs

Port Noarlunga is a suburb in the City of Onkaparinga, South Australia. It is a small sea-side suburb, with a population of 2,918 (2016 census), about 30 kilometres (19 miles) to the south of the Adelaide city centre and was originally created as a sea port. This area is now popular as a holiday destination or for permanent residents wishing to commute to Adelaide or work locally. There is a jetty that connects to a 1.6 kilometres (0.99 miles) natural reef that is exposed at low tide.

It is known as Tainbarang or Tainbarilla by the traditional owners, the Kaurna people, and is of significance as being the site of a freshwater spring said to be created by the tears of Tjilbruke, the creator being. A reserve known as the Tutu Wirra Reserve, on Witton Bluff, is the location of the stone cairn commemorating the second spring created by Tjilbruke on his journey down the coast.

The suburb is bounded to the south by the Onkaparinga River, including a tidal estuary. It is bounded to the west by the coastline with Gulf St Vincent, by Christies Beach to the north and by Noarlunga Centre and Noarlunga Downs to the east.

== History ==
Before the British colonisation of South Australia, this area, along with most of the Adelaide plains area and down the western side of the Fleurieu Peninsula, was inhabited by the Kaurna people. There is a significant site associated with the Kaurna Dreaming of the creator ancestor Tjilbruke in the area.

The first record of the area was provided by Captain Collet Barker who explored the Onkaparinga River on 15 April 1831 in his search for a Gulf outlet from Lake Alexandrina. In early 1837, while camped by the Sturt River near Marion, South Australia's only two horses slipped their tether ropes during the night and the overseer of stock, C.W. Stuart led an expedition to recover them. Taking a botanist to record the plants encountered, the expedition searched much of present-day Noarlunga before finding the horses near the Onkaparinga River. The men being on foot were however, unable to capture them. In June 1837, Colonel William Light led an overland expedition to arrest whalers who had been abducting native women at Encounter Bay, 100 kilometres (62 mi) south of Adelaide. Cresting Tapleys Hill they named the valley Morphett Vale after expedition member John Morphett. They reached the southern end of the Mount Lofty Ranges before impenetrable scrub forced them to return to Adelaide. The following year, John McLaren of the Survey Dept. divided the area south of Adelaide into three districts (B.C and D) based on the reports made by the Stuart and Light expeditions. B and C districts, the present Noarlunga District, was opened to public selection in February 1839 and by 1841 the population was estimated to be about 150.

A shore-based bay whaling station was established near the mouth of the Onkaparinga River by George Heppenstall in 1841. The operation consisted of 25 men and two boats. They also had a small punt which was used as a cutting-in platform. Heppenstall built a house nearby which he later called "Whaleview." It is reputed to be the first permanent structure in the area. The fishery ceased operation in 1843.

The government town of Port Noarlunga was surveyed and offered for sale on 14 April 1859.

The township was originally settled as a port for the produce from the proposed market town of Noarlunga a few kilometres upstream. The Onkaparinga River mouth proved unsuitable to coastal ketches, so produce was barged down river to the sandhills and then taken by horse drawn rail trucks to the jetty. The current jetty was constructed in 1921 and is the second jetty to have been constructed at Port Noarlunga. The original jetty, 30 metres south of the current jetty, was constructed in 1855, but was destroyed in several severe storms in the early 1900s.

In the early 20th century Port Noarlunga was a popular coastal holiday destination, with the beach proving an attraction with its natural beauty and in summer amusement fairs were run, as well as row boating on the river estuary. Port Noarlunga Post Office opened around November 1909.

With the gradual incursion of urban sprawl, and in particular immigration-fuelled expansion in the 1960s and 1970s, the township eventually became an outer suburb of Adelaide. The South Australian Housing Trust in particular developed housing in the nearby areas of Christies Beach and O'Sullivan Beach and with the extension of the metropolitan rail line to adjacent Noarlunga Centre in 1978 the township of Port Noarlunga had largely lost its attraction as a holiday destination.

=== Significant sites ===
There is a stone cairn with commemorative plaque in the Tutu Wirra Reserve to mark a place near the second freshwater spring created by Kaurna ancestor hero Tjilbruke in his journey down the coast.

=== State heritage places ===
The following places within Port Noarlunga are listed as "state heritage places" on the South Australian Heritage Register:

- Perry Homestead, 80 Murray Road.
- Dwelling and outbuildings, 53 Old Honeypot Road.
- Port Noarlunga Hotel, 29 Saltfleet Street.
- Sauerbier's House, 21 Wearing Street.

== Attractions ==
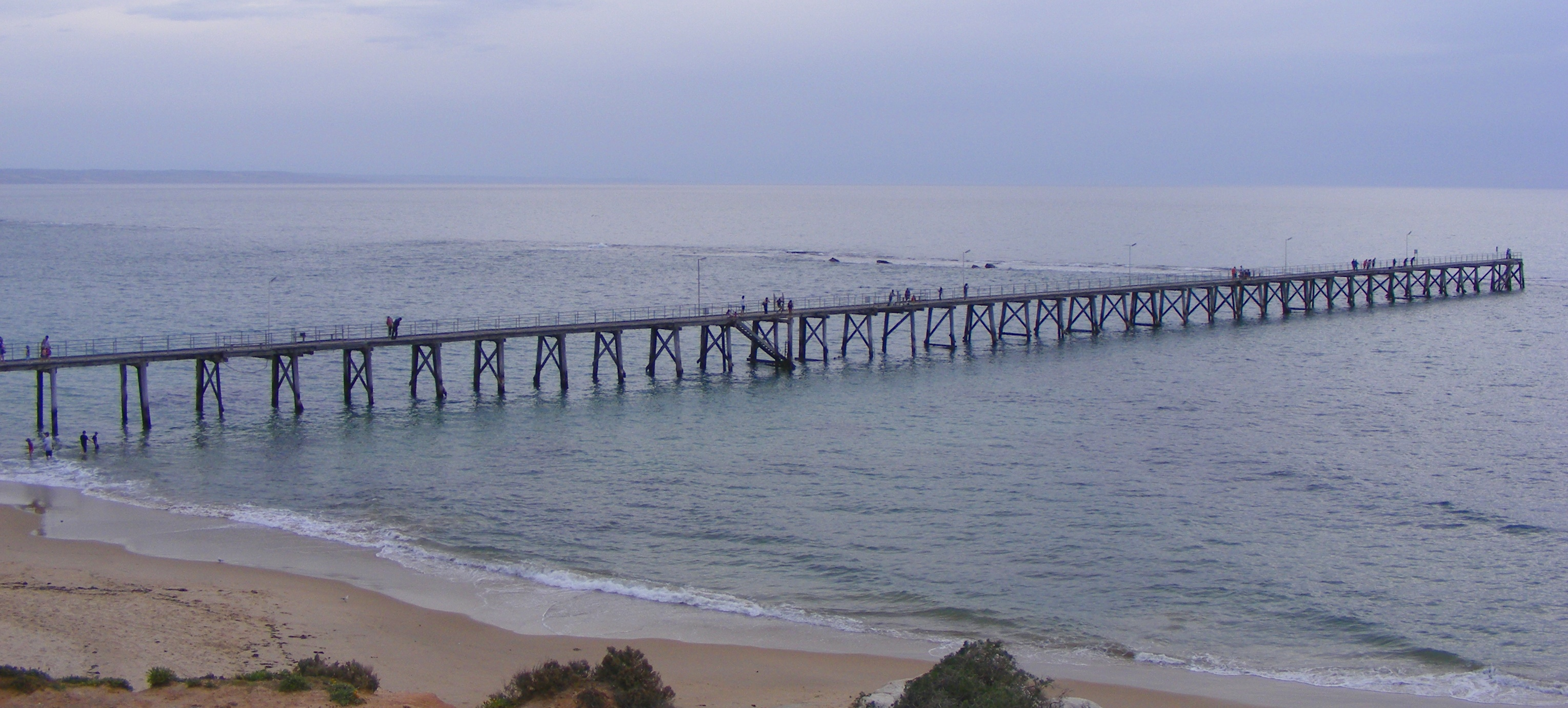
Port Noarlunga jetty

=== Beach and jetty ===
Port Noarlunga beach is popular with tourists and residents with safe swimming areas patrolled by two surf life saving clubs. It features in the 2012 book 101 Best Australian Beaches by Andy Short and Brad Farmer.

The first jetty at Port Noarlunga was constructed for coastal trade. Work commenced in 1854 and on its completion the following year it was known as Port Onkaparinga. The first jetty had fallen into disrepair by the turn of the 20th century. Interest was expressed in repairing or replacing the jetty during the 1910s, but work did not commence until the conclusion of World War I due to difficulties obtaining government funding. Plans were made and tenders were called in October 1918. At its official opening in December 1921 it stood 1,250 feet in length and had been constructed at a cost of £6000-7000.

The present timber jetty extends from the shore over the beach and out towards the reef, which forms a natural breakwater. It is illuminated at night and features three staircases, one that leads down to the beach, and two that provide access to the water to swimmers, snorkelers and divers. It is also accessible to wheelchairs and scooters.

In November 2018, the stairs at the reef end of the jetty were dislodged from the main structure by strong winds and wave energy during a storm. They were replaced with a sturdier modern construction featuring multiple platforms in 2020.

The remains of the old jetty's piles lie 30 metres to the south of the existing jetty and are occasionally exposed following storms.

=== Township ===
There is also a small main street (Gawler Street) that serves visitors and locals in this beach area. It has several cafes, a pub, a fish and chip shop, a surf shop and several other businesses providing services to the locals. The old "Institute" building, built in 1924, is now the community centre.

=== Port Noarlunga Reef ===
Port Noarlunga Reef is regarded as one of South Australia's best snorkeling sites and is popular with underwater photographers. It is a narrow reef about 400 metres (1,300 feet) offshore and about 1.6 kilometres (0.99 miles) long and was formed from a consolidated Pleistocene sand dune. The reef runs parallel to shore and has two sections, with the area separating them called The Gap. It is a popular scuba diving and snorkelling location, with 83 marine plant species and 132 ray-finned fish species identified. There is a self-guided diving trail which was established in 1994, which is marked with a series of 12 glass plaques. The plaques indicate aspects of the reef ecosystem relevant to their location.

=== Port Noarlunga Reef Aquatic Reserve ===
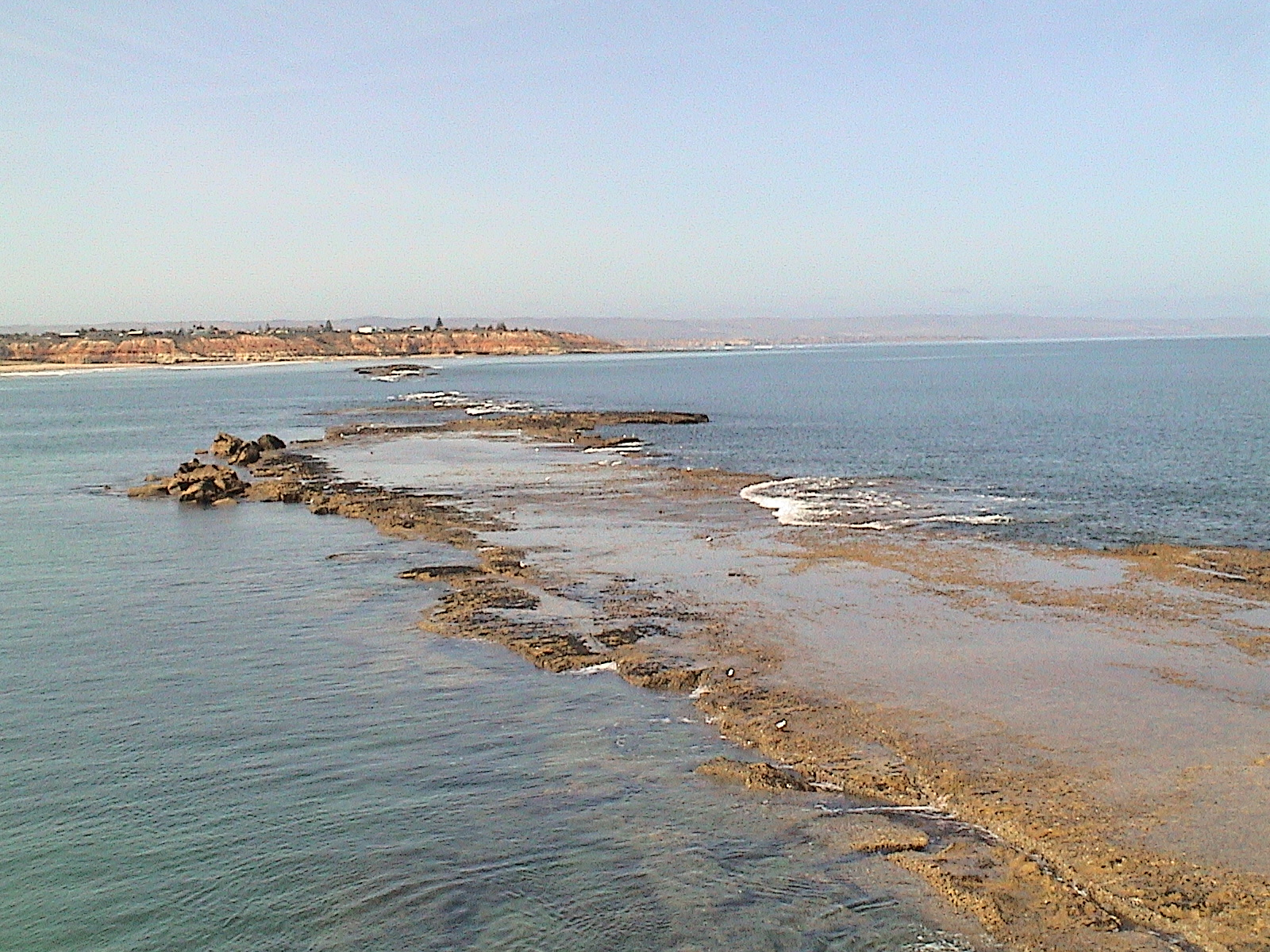
Port Noarlunga Reef at low tide, view to South from the jetty

The Port Noarlunga Reef Aquatic Reserve is one of six aquatic reserves proclaimed in South Australia in 1971 with it being established specifically to protect the reef life and the adjacent river estuary. The boundaries of the reserve were extended to the north in 1993 to include an adjacent limestone reef known as Horseshoe Reef at Christies Beach. As of 2007, it extends along the coastline from Onkaparinga Head at Port Noarlunga South in the south to Gulfview Road at Christies Beach in the north and includes the Onkaparinga River up until the Main South Road at Old Noarlunga. The reserve covers an area of 527 hectares (1,300 acres). Fishing activity is limited to the use of rod and handline while the use of 'hand nets for the taking of shrimps for bait only' is permitted in estuary and the Onkaparinga River. No fishing is permitted within 25 metres (82 feet) of Horseshoe and Port Noarlunga Reefs and can only be carried out from the jetty and the beach at Port Noarlunga.

=== Port Noarlunga tyre reef and shipwrecks ===
Three artificial reefs lie in close proximity to each other, offshore from Port Noarlunga, and can be explored by divers. The Port Noarlunga Tyre Reef is a man-made construction of tyre pyramids in 20 metres of water. Nearby lie the H. A. Lumb (a steel tug) and the MV Seawolf (a former fishing boat). The H. A. Lumb was scuttled by the Dive Industry Association in 1994 and the MV Seawolf was scuttled by the Seawolves dive club in 2002 after fundraising efforts. The H.A. Lumb lies in 20 metres of water 2.5 km west of the Port Noarlunga jetty, with the MV Seawolf is located slightly to the south east of her. All three sites can be accessed during a single dive.

=== Port Noarlunga Aquatic Centre ===
Since 1976, the Port Noarlunga Aquatic Centre has operated classes for primary school children from throughout the state. The program runs in the first and last school terms each year and provides the opportunity to try waveskiing, canoeing, fishing, snorkelling, sailing, swimming and sailboarding. About 15,000 students have access to this program each year.

== Protected area status ==
Port Noarlunga includes parts of the following protected areas. The Encounter Marine Park and the Port Noarlunga Reef Aquatic Reserve both occupy land within the intertidal zone of the suburb along the coastline with Gulf St Vincent and the Onkaparinga River. The Encounter Marine Park also occupies the undeveloped area in the south of the suburb adjoining the mouth of the Onkaparinga River.

== See also ==
- Noarlunga (disambiguation)

== Notes and references ==
=== References ===
- Martella, Lita (19 December 2023). Port Noarlunga An Endearing Coastal Town. Australia: Lita Martella. ISBN 978-0-646-40222-2.
- Onkaparinga Estuary Information Package Accessed 5 March 2013.
- Postcards profile
