= Noarlunga =

Noarlunga (/nɔːrˈlʌŋɡə/ nor-LUNG-gə) is a South Australian placename which refer to several entities within the southern Adelaide metropolitan area. For all placenames including the word Noarlunga, the etymology used for the Hundred of Noarlunga applies. Noarlunga may refer to any of the following:

- Old Noarlunga, South Australia, known as Noarlunga from 1840 until 1978
- Noarlunga Centre, South Australia, suburb established 1978
- City of Noarlunga, a former local government area
- Hundred of Noarlunga, a cadastral unit
- Noarlunga railway station (1914–1969) on Willunga railway line
- Noarlunga Centre railway station established 1978
- Noarlunga City Tigers, former basketball club
- Noarlunga Football Club, an Australian rules football club
- Noarlunga United, a soccer football club
- Noarlunga Hospital, located in Noarlunga Centre

== See also ==
- Noarlunga Centre, South Australia
- Noarlunga Downs, South Australia
- Port Noarlunga (disambiguation)
