= Christies Beach, South Australia =

Christies Beach
- Suburb
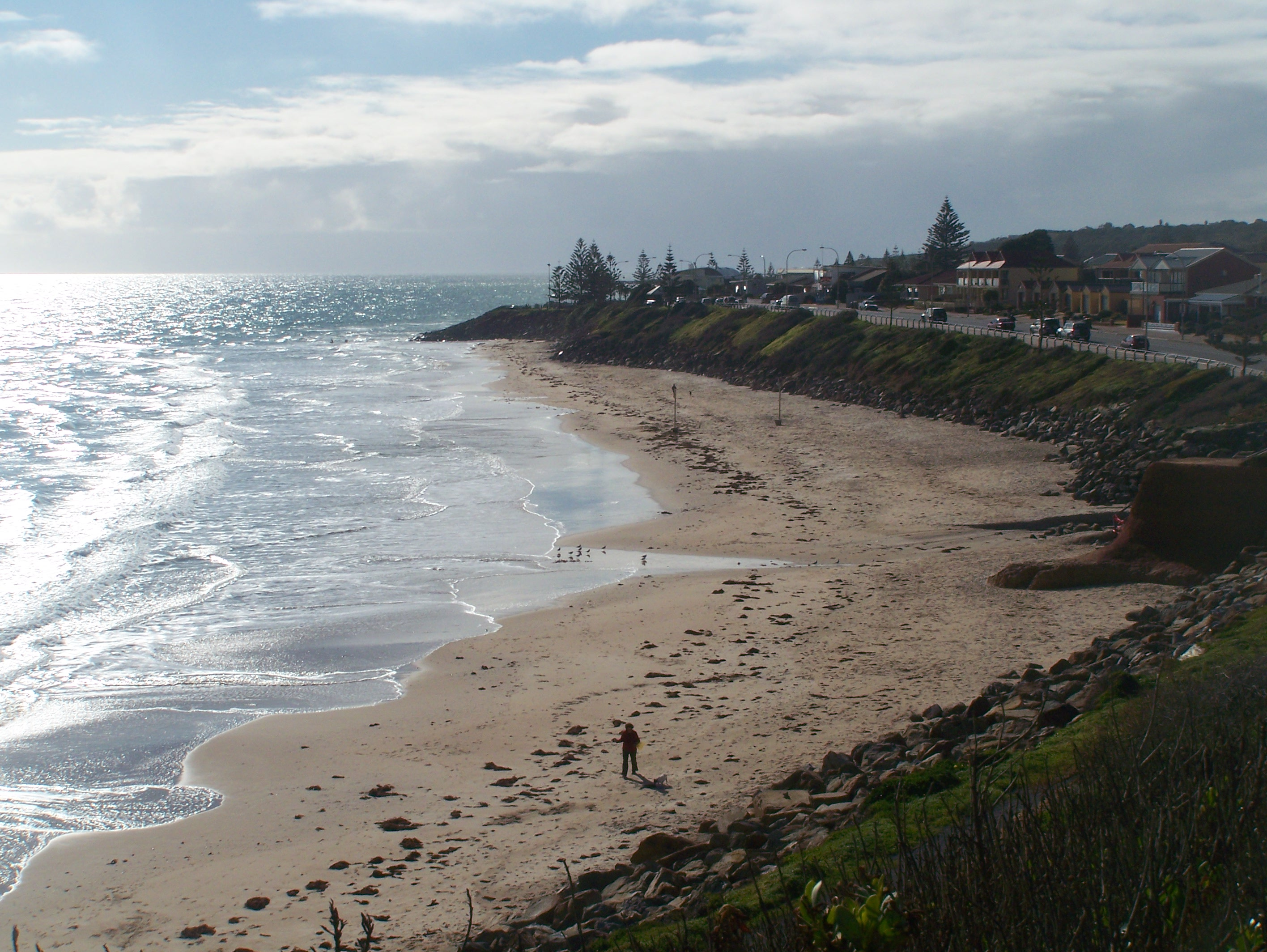
- View of the Christies Beach coastline from Witton Bluff

- Coordinates: 35.134940°S 138.476960°E
- Country: Australia
- State: South Australia
- Region: Southern Adelaide
- City: Adelaide
- LGA: City of Onkaparinga
- Location: 26 km (16 mi) from Adelaide city centre
- Established: 1925

Government
  - State electorate: Reynell
  - Federal division: Kingston

Population
  - Total: 5,962 (SAL 2021)
- Postcode: 5165
- County: Adelaide
- Mean max temp: 21.7 °C (71.1 °F)
- Mean min temp: 12.8 °C (55.0 °F)
- Annual rainfall: 448.7 mm (17.67 in)
Suburbs around Christies Beach
Gulf St Vincent	O'Sullivan Beach	Lonsdale
Gulf St Vincent	Christies Beach	Christie Downs; Noarlunga Centre
Gulf St Vincent	Port Noarlunga	Noarlunga Centre
- Coordinates; Location; Climate; Adjoining suburbs

Christies Beach is a seaside suburb in the southern Adelaide metropolitan area, within the City of Onkaparinga. The area is scenic, and hence popular with photographers as Witton Bluff provides a natural vantage point over the entire suburb and beyond.

Christies Beach boasts a unique commercial strip running the entire length of Beach Road and is identified as a primary coastal node in the Adelaide Metropolitan area. Christies Beach also features one of the few remaining main road classified Esplanades in Metropolitan Adelaide, providing direct access to the beach on Gulf St Vincent.

Christies Beach has its own postcode of 5165, and is adjacent to the suburbs of Christie Downs and Noarlunga Centre to the east, Port Noarlunga to the south, and O'Sullivan Beach to the north.

Offshore from Christies Beach is Horseshoe Reef, which is exposed at low tide. A new artificial subtidal reef was constructed approximately 500 metres offshore from the mouth of Christies Creek in 2021.

== Development ==
The very first development to occur along the coast of Christies Beach can be traced back to pre-colonization times, almost 40,000 years ago. The indigenous Kaurna people used the coastal area of Christies Beach (at the time known as Mullawirratingga), as a place for seasonal residence. They constructed structures known as a wodli, which are small shelters made of branches and leaves. These structures were semi-permanent, only lasting the length of the summer period, after which they were then disassembled (City of Onkaparinga, 2005).

The first European development along the Christies Beach coastline was constructed in the 1830s. A whaling station was constructed along the coast, influenced by the rising price of whale bone overseas, the abundant Southern right whale population during the summer breeding season and the vantage point of Gulf St Vincent from Witton Bluff. By the 1840s the seasonal whale population dwindled down to unprofitable levels with the whales changing their migration route, and the whalers left the area to pursue other activities (Colwell, 1972).

An area of surveyed land covering Glenelg to Witton Bluff (Christies Beach) known as District B, was made available for settlement in 1838. Many farmers took plots of land along the Anderson Creek (now known as Christies Creek). In 1895 Lambert Christie and his wife Rosa established a farm that covered the area where Christies Beach is now situated. The entire area remained a land of farming communities until 1923. This is when Rosa Christie created the first subdivision in the area, it was named Christie Beach. With this subdivision and other such residential allocations in the area road and rail transportation was improved.

The improvement in transportation south of Adelaide gave Christies Beach an increase in tourists and holiday makers who were looking for a coastal experience. Many tourists decided to build cottages and holiday shacks on Witton Bluff and down onto the beach itself (City of Onkaparinga, 2005).

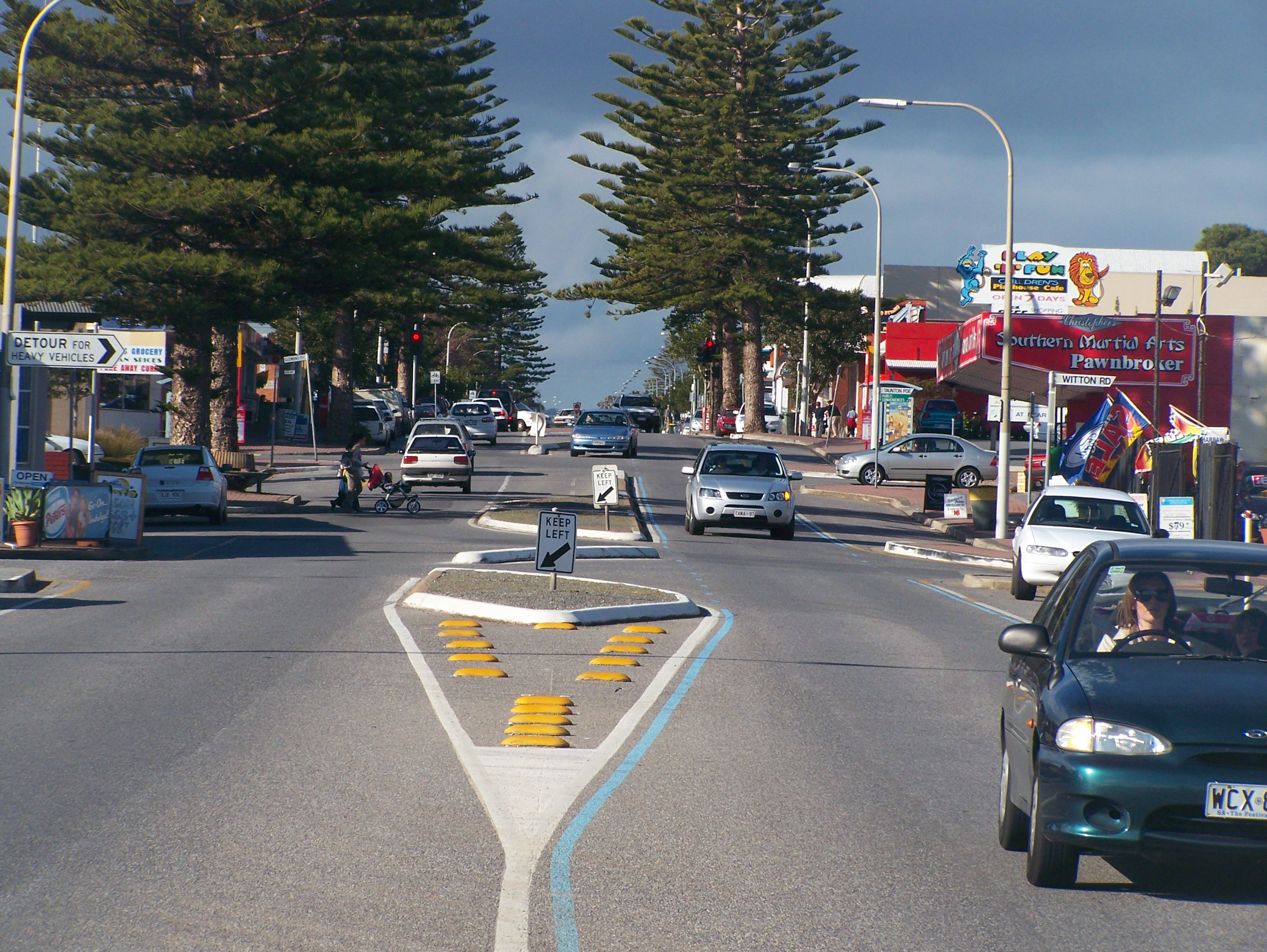
Beach Road commercial district looking up from the beach.

With the influx of visitors and new residents to the area the Christies Beach Progressive Association was formed to provide good foreshore amenities, such as beach access, toilets, showers, etc. Foreshore developments led to the creation of new shops and services on the Esplanade and nearby Gulfview and Beach Roads. By the late 1950s demand for residence in the area skyrocketed, this propelled commercial and industrial developments in the Lonsdale district with the opening of Port Stanvac Oil Refinery and Chrysler (later Mitsubishi), engine plant and also in Noarlunga with the relocation of the railway line and the construction of Colonnades Shopping Centre (City of Onkaparinga, 2005).

Christie Beach Post Office opened on 3 April 1945 and was renamed Christies Beach around 1961. Christies Beach North office opened on 5 June 1962.

== Wastewater treatment plant ==
One of metropolitan Adelaide's three largest wastewater treatment plants exists at Christies Beach, immediately north of Christies Creek. Currently operated by SA Water, it commenced operating in 1970 and was expanded in 1981 to meet the needs of a growing population. Further expansion works were undertaken in 2013. As of 2021, the plant treats sewage for use as biogas, biosolids and recycled water, and a further portion of treated wastewater is released to the environment. In the financial year 2018-19 the most significant pollutants discharged to the marine environment by mass were: nitrogen (56 tonnes), phosphorus (37 tonnes) and chlorine (6 tonnes).

== Future development ==
Existing foreshore developments include toilet facilities, benches, shelter, barbecue facilities, native vegetation plantations, fencing, informational signage, beach access stairs, and paved footpaths on both sides of the Esplanade. Recently, all overhead power lines along the Esplanade have been converted to underground power lines to improve the scenic value of the foreshore.

Future development plans for the Christies Beach foreshore established under the Metropolitan Coast Park Plan include the allocation of parking areas to remove on the side of the road parking, continued planting of native vegetation and the creation of more open recreation grass spaces, and converting the footpath into a multi-recreational path that can be used by walkers and cyclists alike and is connected to similar coastal paths along coasts further north and south, and changing the flow of traffic along the coast so as to turn it into a recreational road, rather than a thoroughfare. There are plans for a coastal trail from Christies Beach to Port Noarlunga, called the Witton Bluff Base Trail, with the application for funding being considered.

== Sport ==
The central sporting hub for the Christies Beach area is the John Bice Memorial Oval, home of the Christies Beach Football Club, Southern Districts Cricket Club and the Christies Beach Sports and Social Club. At the waterfront, the Christies Beach Sailing Club and Christies Beach Surf Lifesaving Club cater for participants in aquatic sports. A small concrete boat ramp exists for launching and landing watercraft.

== Historical sites ==
=== Morrow Road Bridge ===
The Morrow Road bridge over Christies Creek, a Local Heritage place, was once the main road bridge linking Christies Beach to O'Sullivan Beach. The structure is thought to be the only remaining example of a wooden road bridge in the former Noarlunga Council area.

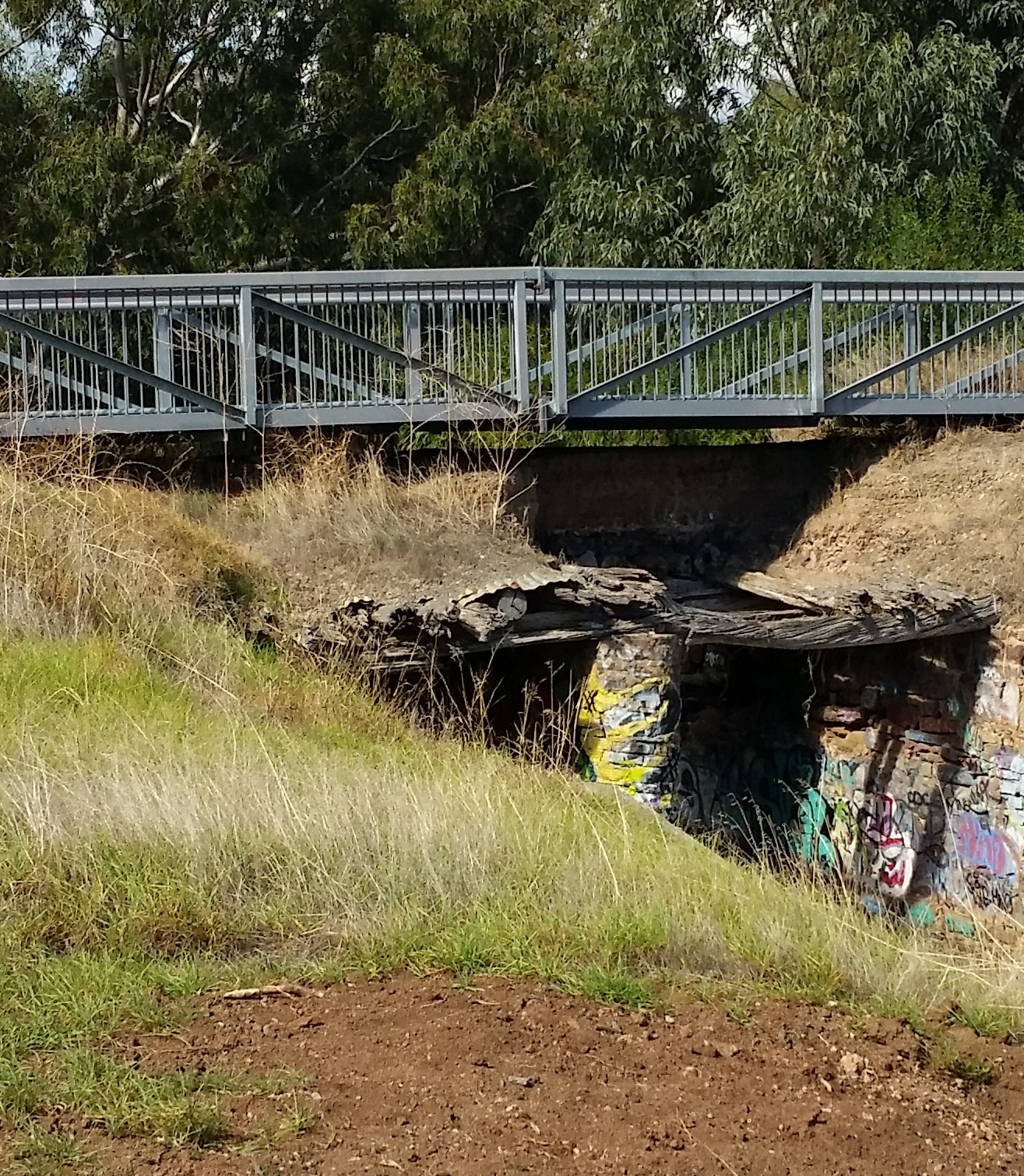
Morrow Road Bridge, Christies Beach, South Australia, April 2016.

== Parks and reserves ==
=== Lohmann Park ===
Situated on Galloway Road between Gulf View Road and Carmichael Road, Lohmann Park is home to The Rainmakers, a statue of bronze Aboriginal warriors. The sculpture was gifted to the people of Noarlunga City Council by Eugen Lohmann Esq., the Governing Director of Wender and Duerholt, a (West) German building company which had built a number of South Australian Housing Trust homes in the area. The statue was unveiled by then Premier of South Australia, Frank Walsh, on 21 May 1965.

Also located in the park is a memorial to former City of Onkaparinga councillor Alan Oakes.

=== D. M. Coe Reserve ===
Situated on an easement between Vincent Street and Dorothea Street, D. M. Coe Reserve comprises open space with a small playground. The reserve is named after Daphne Mary Coe, a councillor of the former City of Noarlunga.

=== Ron Gill Reserve ===
Located on the corner of Brixton Street and Clovelly Avenue, the reserve comprises three tennis courts, a basketball ring, public toilets, open space, a small playground and the Ron Gill Memorial Hall, a community hall. The community hall is the home of the Rotary Club of Noarlunga and the Brixton Street Social Tennis Club. The reserve is named after Ron Gill, the first president of the Rotary Club of Noarlunga in 1966.

=== Tom McBeath Reserve ===
Located between Vincent Street, King Street, Shepherd Road and a service road to the adjacent shops, Tom McBeath comprises open space, some trees, the Christies North Kindergarten and the hall of the disbanded 1st Christies Beach Scout Group. It is named after Tom McBeath, a former president of the Rotary Club of Noarlunga from 1970–1971, who was also a strong supporter of the nearby Christies Beach Meals on Wheels.

=== Peters Park ===
The park on Archer Street was formally named Peters Park on 16 April 2019. It was named after the Peters Family in recognition of the family's long history in the neighbourhood and contribution to the park for over 55 years. Allan Peters lobbied the City of Noarlunga in 1972 to landscape the park, and along with wife Pauline, daughters Ani and Leeza, and friends, decorated surrounding Stobie poles with murals, and over the years have donated their time cleaning up rubbish and reporting graffiti.
