= Morialta Conservation Park =

Protected area in South Australia

- IUCN category III (natural monument or feature)
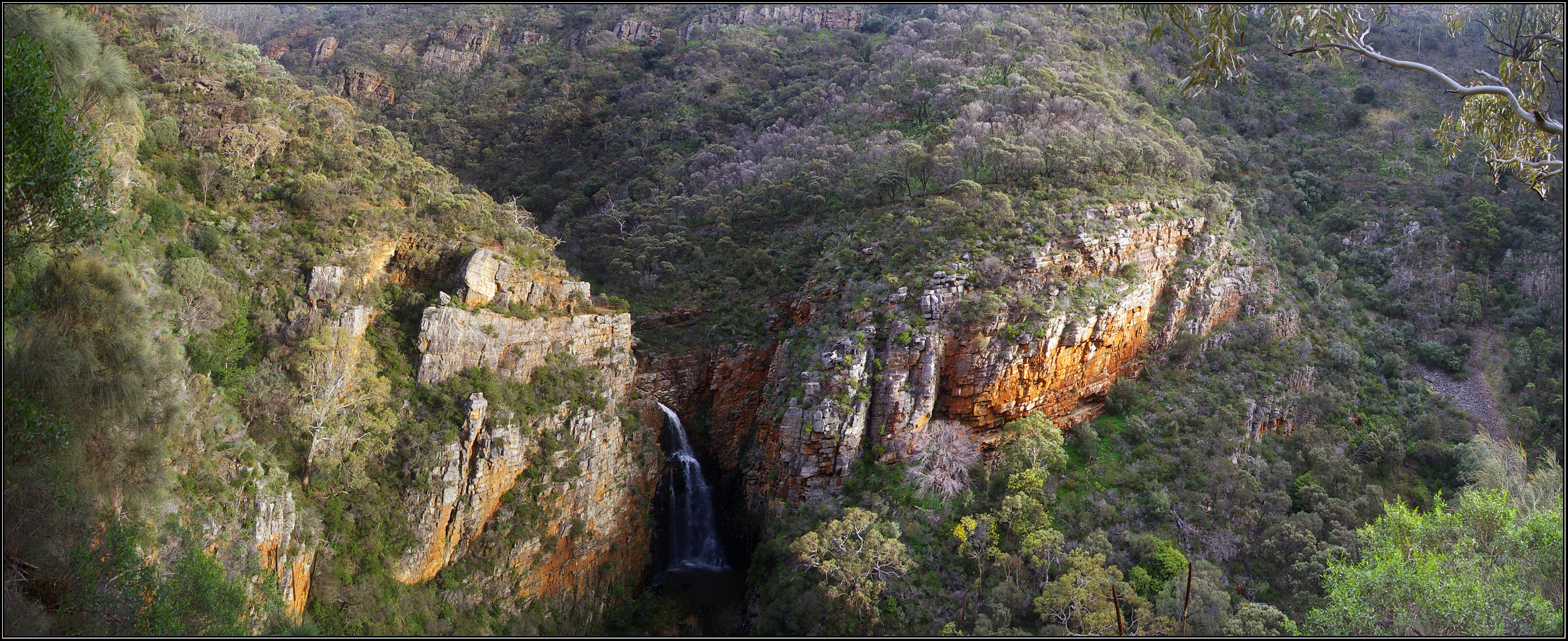
- Morialta Conservation Park showing First Falls and Morialta Gorge, note scree slope at far right.

- Location within South Australia
- Location: South Australia
- Nearest city: Adelaide
- Coordinates: 34°54′02″S 138°42′38″E
- Area: 5.33 km^{2} (2.06 sq mi)
- Established: 15 July 1915
- Visitors: 300,000 (in 2001)
- Governing body: Department for Environment and Water
- Website: Official website

Morialta Conservation Park, formerly the Morialta Falls Reserve and the Morialta Falls National Pleasure Resort, is a protected area 10 km north-east of Adelaide city centre, in the state of South Australia, Australia. The park is in a rugged bush environment, with a narrow gorge set with three waterfalls, bounded by steep ridges and cliffs. The park caters to many activities, including bushwalking, bird watching and rock climbing.

The name is derived from the Kaurna name Marriyarta, meaning "eastern land or country".

== History ==
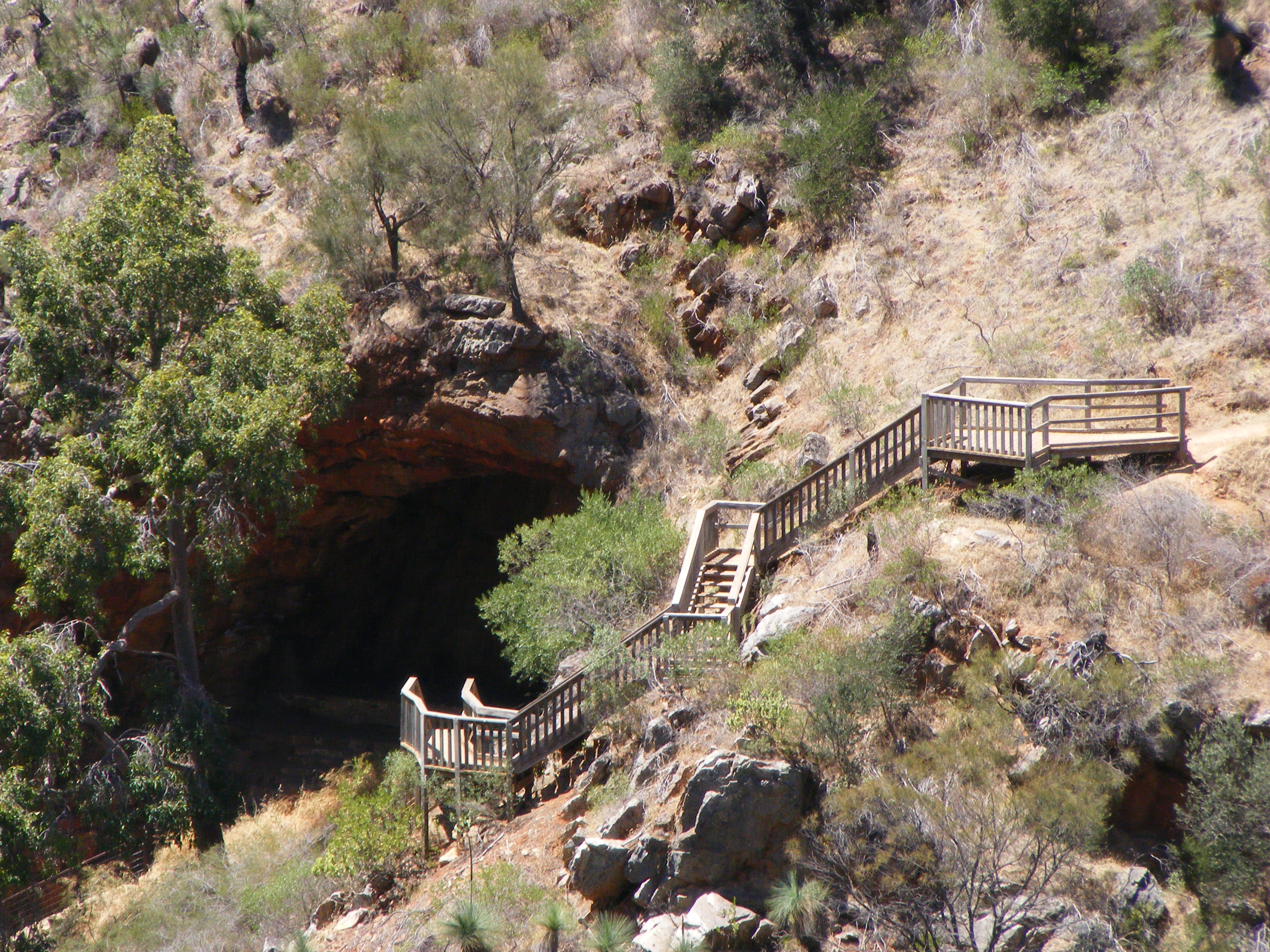
Giant's Cave

John Smith Reid who was a landholder in the area, offered to donate part of his land in 1911 to create a national reserve. Reid donated 218 hectares (540 acres) in 1913. On 15 July 1915, the land was declared a National Pleasure Resort under the National Pleasure Resorts Act 1914 with the name, Morialta Falls Reserve. Much of the construction work in the National Pleasure Resort was begun in the 1920s and 1930s, although floods and bushfires have destroyed much of this original work. In 1966 additional property to the east was added. On 29 September 1966, a proclamation made under the Crown Lands Act 1929 resumed all of the land occupied by the National Pleasure Resort and then divided it into a reserve for "waterworks purposes" and a reserve with the name, the Morialta Falls National Pleasure Resort. On 27 April 1972, the national pleasure resort was reconstituted under the National Parks and Wildlife Act 1972 as the Morialta Conservation Park.

In 1980, it was listed on the now-defunct Register of the National Estate.

Major rebuilding was required after flooding in 1980, and flooding in November 2005 again caused damage to paths and walkways.

== Prior use of the land ==
The land which now constitutes the Park was originally the land of the Kaurna people. Morialta is a word derived from the Kaurna language, originally thought to be marri-yartalla, "marri" meaning east and yertala meaning "flowing water". More recent research has shown that the etymology of the word is marri, meaning "east" and probably yarta, meaning "land, earth, country", or possibly yalta, meaning "cool, fresh, airy"; therefore, probably meaning "eastern land or country".

It is said that the area was used as a hunting ground, and to collect firewood, during the winter months when the Kaurna would retreat from the coast to the hills. It is also said that they practised fire-stick farming here. The area's religious significance appears to be lost to time. For in 1839, only three years after the proclamation of the British colony of South Australia in 1836, the area was granted by the new South Australian Government to pastoralists. In 1847, John Baker bought the land and built the grand Morialta House and Morialta Barns on Fourth Creek, near the head of the gorge.

== Geography and climate ==
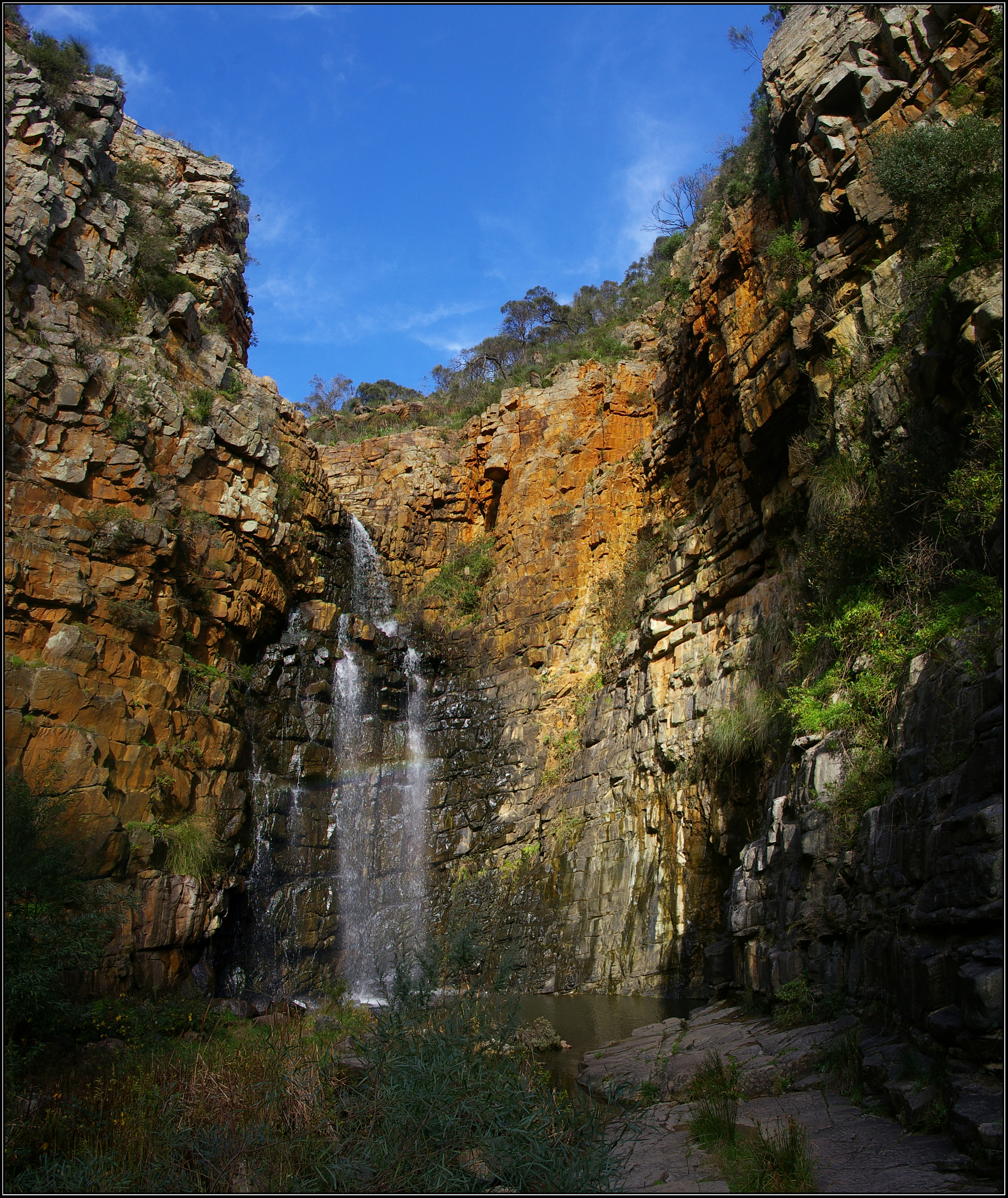
First Falls

Second Falls

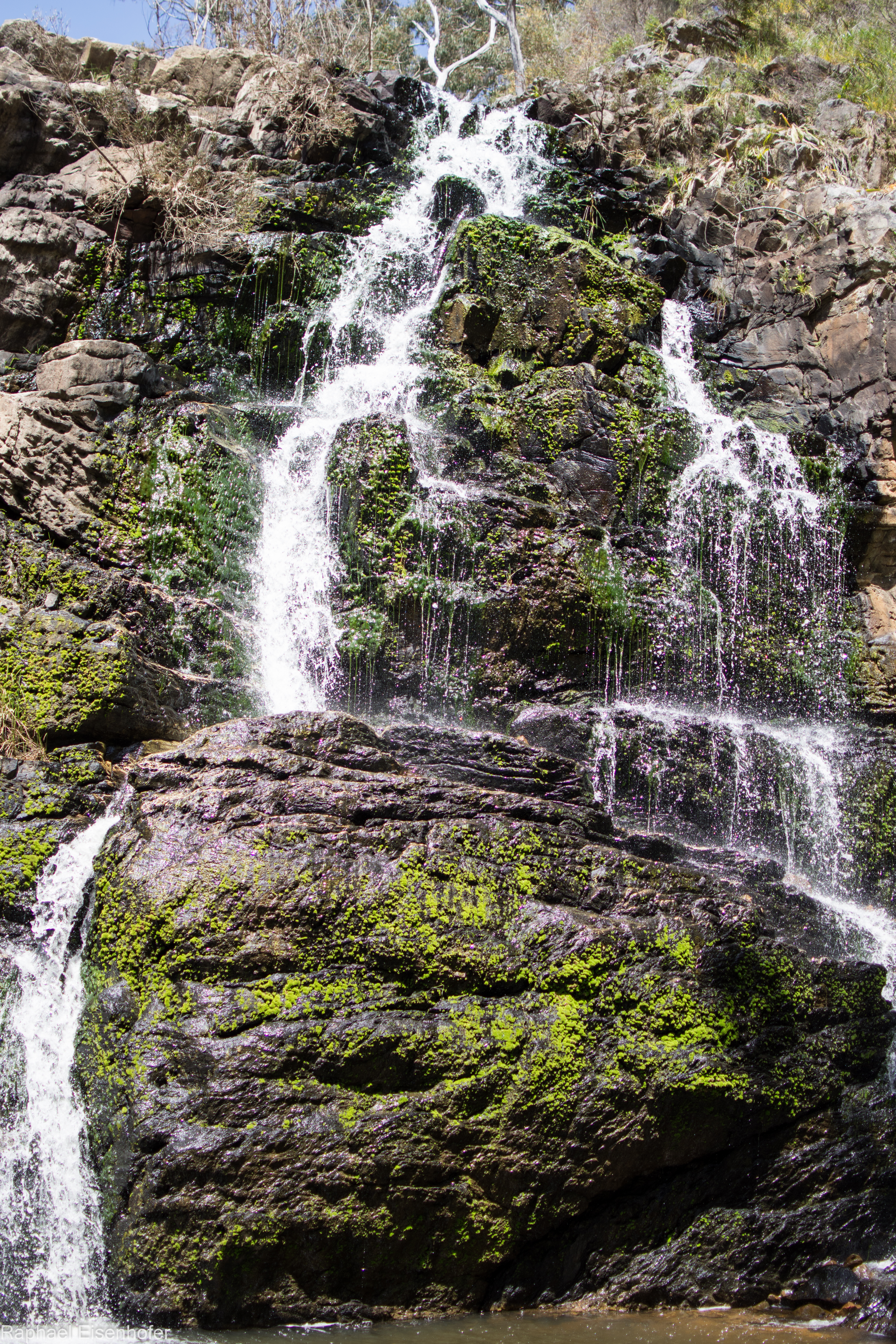
Morialta Third Falls

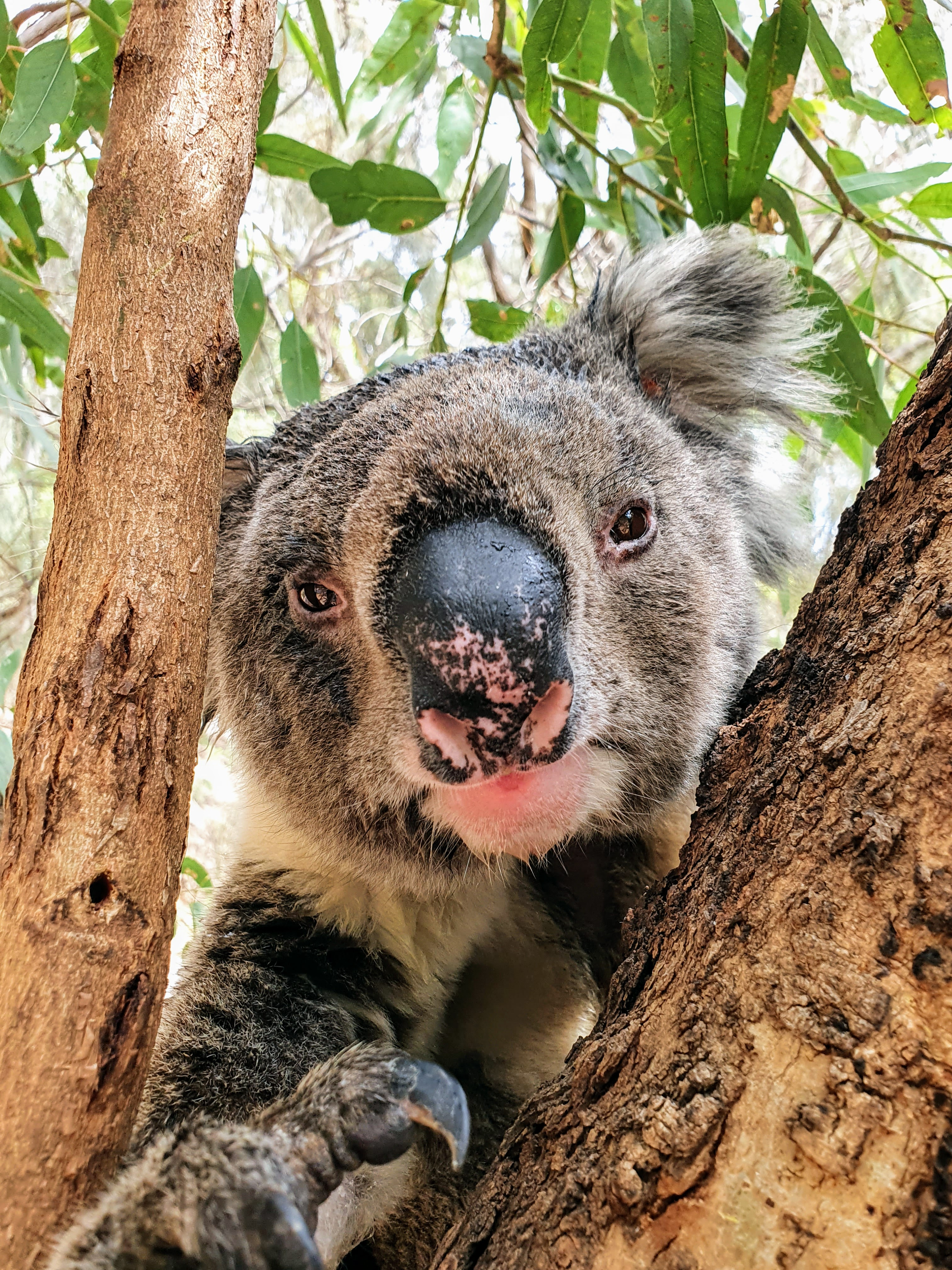
Found this Koala climbing down the tree on a very Hot Day.

Morialta Conservation Park covers 5.33 km^{2} within the Mount Lofty Ranges, which run north–south to the east of Adelaide's coastal plain. It is bounded by Black Hill Conservation Park on the north, Norton Summit road on the south, the suburb of Rostrevor on the west, and by agricultural land on the east.

The park lies mostly on either side of Morialta Gorge, along the bottom of which runs Fourth Creek. There are three waterfalls on the creek, named respectively First, Second and Third Falls.

The main access to the park is via the vehicle entrance off Morialta Road, and there is walking access at various points along Norton Summit Road.

Morialta shares Adelaide's Mediterranean climate, with average temperatures of 17 degrees Celsius in winter, to 28 degrees during summer. The park receives average annual rainfall of 800 mm, mostly between May and September. During summer (December to February) temperatures can rise above 40 degrees.

== Activities ==
The park caters for a variety of activities, including bushwalking, picnics, rock climbing and bird watching. There are many walking paths within the park. A 2017 project saw the park receive a new large nature play area in the foot of the park. The park has 4 official bushwalking paths, each of varying difficulty.

Path Name	Difficulty	Length of Path	Description
First Falls Walk	Grade 2	1.6 km	A walk along Fourth Creek, passing Morialta Gorge and Giant's Cave to the base of the First Falls.
Plateau Hike	Grade 4	2.5 km	A walk beginning along Fourth Creek, ascending to the top of Giant's Cave and First Falls. The trail includes steep sections and rocky, uneven surfaces where hikers should take care.
Second Falls Hike	Grade 4	5.3 km	A trail with panoramic views of Adelaide, and also visits both the First and Second Falls.
Third Falls Hike	Grade 4	7.3 km	A trail with additional views of all three waterfalls, with multiple lookouts scattered through.

There are also several trails which pass through Morialta Conservation Park, including the Heysen Trail and the Yurrebilla Trail, the latter terminating at Black Hill Conservation Park.

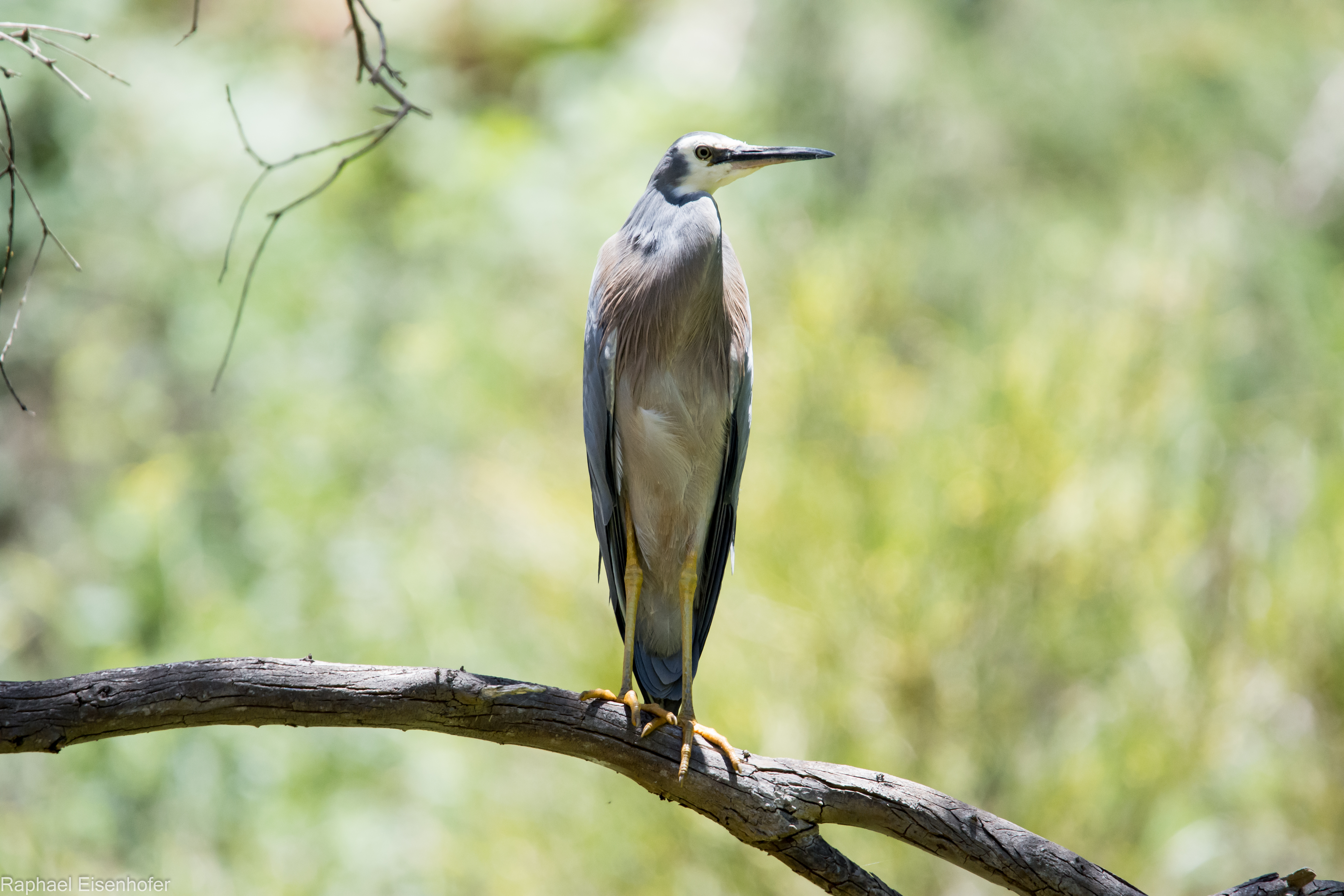
White Faced Heron in Morialta Conservation Park

== Rock Climbing ==
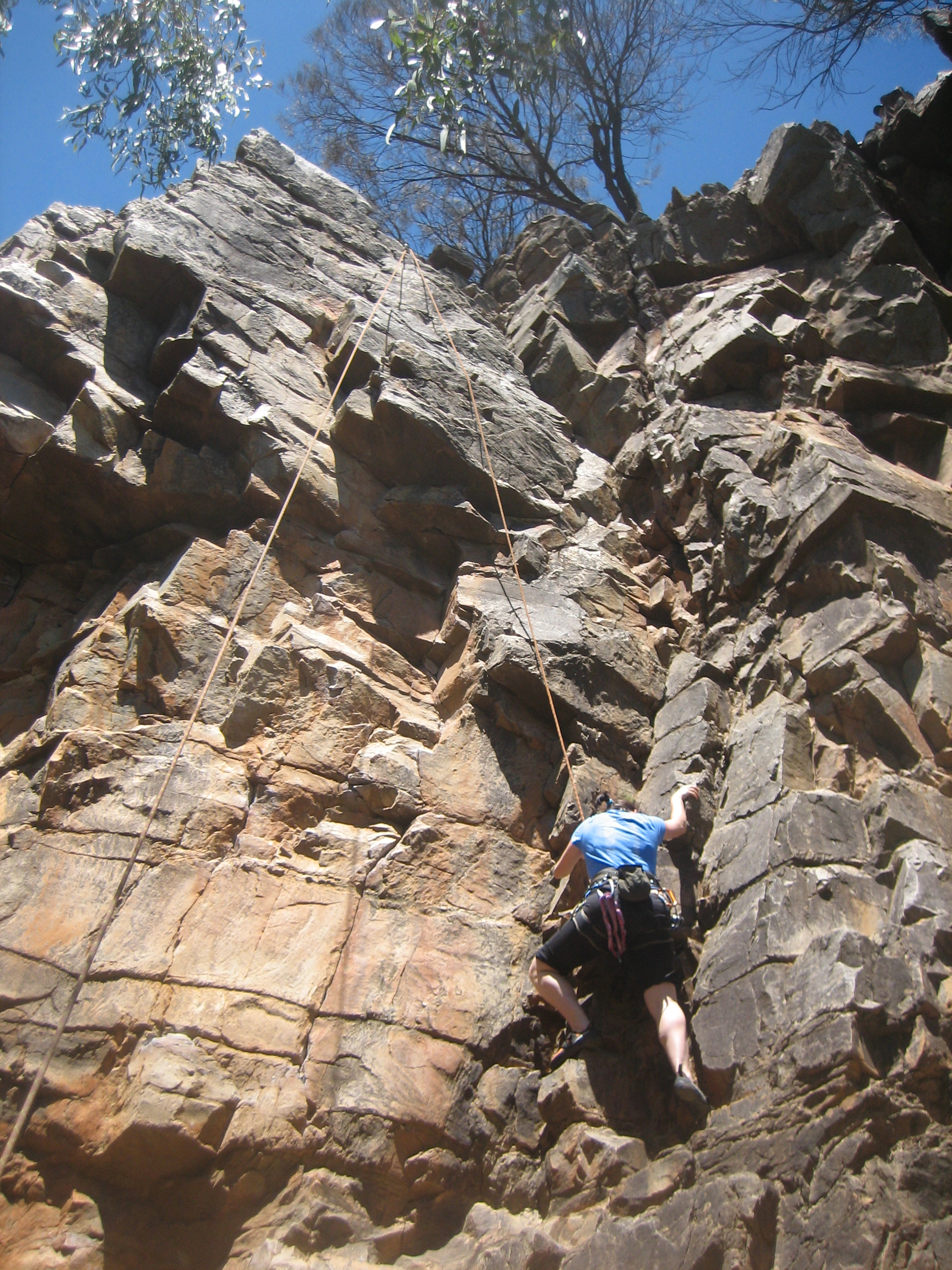
Toproping Balthazar (12) near Boulder Bridge.

Being only 10 km from the centre of Adelaide and having a large number of climbs, Morialta is one of the most popular rock climbing areas in South Australia. The rock is quartzite, and there are heavy duty rings at the top of most routes to allow for easy top-roping.

There are several crags along both sides of the gorge. On the southern side, from the western end, there is Milestone Buttress, The Outcrops, The Buttress, Billiard Table, Boulder Bridge, Throne Room and Far Crag. On the northern side there is The Lost Walls and Thorn Buttress. Far Crag is one of the more popular crags, with over 67 routes graded from 4 (Ewbanks) to 27.

=== History ===
The first climbing at Morialta was in 1962 by a group from the Adelaide University Mountain Club (AUMC). Four members of the club were given an introduction by the National Fitness Council of South Australia and began regular climbing at the site. Access at this time was from the western end of the park (the Adelaide side) and so the cliffs to the western end were climbed first. No documentation of the climbing occurred until 1968, when Far Crag was discovered. It was named such because it is the furthest from the western end and so had the longest walk to reach it.

A large number of routes were put up at the park up until the 1970s. A visit by international climbers in 1971 saw the standards of free climbing increase at the park, with many new bold routes being led. The late-1970s saw grades at the park reach 25.

Remarkably, The Lost Walls were not discovered until 1986, hence their name and is the most recent addition of a significant number of climbs. 1994 saw the highest graded new route put up in the park, at 27. Access is now from Norton Summit Road, on the southern side of the park.

=== Style of climbing ===
The highest volume of climbing in the gorge is done on top rope, which is made especially easy by the provision of regularly tested steel rings at the tops of many climbs. These rings greatly simplify the task of building an anchor, making outdoor climbing accessible to a broader range of people.

Although most routes can be top-roped, there are routes which are bolted for sport climbing, or suitable for traditional climbing with natural gear, or a mixture of both. Often a route which is suitable for sport or traditional climbing can also be top-roped.

== Notes and references ==
Notes

References

- Pritchard, Greg (2002), Climbing Australia : the essential guide, New Holland, ISBN 978-1-86436-694-5
- Neagle, Nick (1997), The Adelaide Hills : a rock climber's guide, N. Neagle, ISBN 978-0-646-32427-2
