= National Parks and Wildlife Service South Australia =

South Australian government service

Agency overview
- Formed: 1972
- Preceding agency: National Parks and Wildlife Service National Parks and Wildlife National Parks South Australia
- Jurisdiction: State of South Australia
- Website: www.parks.sa.gov.au

Footnotes
- Under the Department for Environment and Water (South Australia)

The National Parks and Wildlife Service South Australia (NPWSSA) is a service within the South Australian Department for Environment and Water that is responsible for national parks and wildlife in the state of South Australia. It was formerly a state government agency known as National Parks and Wildlife Service (NPWS) and later a service under various departments, branded National Parks and Wildlife and National Parks South Australia.

The National Parks and Wildlife Service was founded in 1972 under the National Parks and Wildlife Act 1972 to manage protected areas previously under the supervision of a range of government agencies. Throughout its history, the NPWS has been organised as a division of various departments, including the Department for the Environment until 11 May 1981, the Department of Environment and Planning until 1992 and the Department of Environment and Land Management. The NPWS was reportedly disbanded when the Department of Environment and Land Management changed its name to the Department of Environment and Natural Resources in September 1993.

The use of its name and logo continued until the introduction of a new logo and the accompanying name "National Parks and Wildlife" in early 1997.

As of 2018, services originally provided by the NPWS were being provided by the Department for Environment and Water under the brand of "National Parks South Australia".

In 2019, the service was branded National Parks and Wildlife Service South Australia, a name it has retained as of August 2021, using the initialism NPWSSA. It administers around 360 parks across South Australia that are subject to the National Parks and Wildlife Act and National Parks Regulations.

== Project Firefighter ==
Since 1995, NPWSSA has employed seasonal firefighters to undertake Prescribed Burning in National Parks lands, and private land. As well as this, Project Firefighters take part in fire suppression across National Parks land, and at major incidents alongside the South Australian Country Fire Service. They also do track maintenance and weed control in Parks.

Project Firefighters wear two different uniforms. For day to day work, they wear steel capped boots, khaki work pants, and a high visibility yellow long sleeve shirt with the NPWSSA logo on the left breast, and "Government of South Australia" with the Government of South Australia seal on the left upper arm, along with a high visibility yellow fleece with the NPWSSA logo on the left breast. For firefighting activities Project Firefighters wear lightweight leather fire boots, TecaSafe bottle green pants, and either a lightweight TecaSafe "mop-up" shirt with the NPWSSA logo on the left breast, or a "heavy" jacket with "CFS" across the back.

The main fire vehicles used are MAN based 34 (three-four) Gang Trucks with 3,000L of water, and Toyota 79 Series Landcruiser single cab utes with 500L water tanks. There are various other types of fire vehicles used, such as Isuzu based 14 (one-four) light trucks carrying 1,000L of water, and Mercedes-Benz Atego based 34 CAFS trucks, as well as heavy plant like bulldozers and small diggers. Support type vehicles like Bulk Water Carriers are based on several different truck chassis, with most based on MAN prime movers. Command Cars are also based on multiple different car types.

== See also ==
- Protected areas of South Australia
- NSW National Parks & Wildlife Service
- Parks Victoria
- Queensland Parks and Wildlife Service
- Tasmania Parks and Wildlife Service
- Department of Biodiversity, Conservation and Attractions
- Parks and Wildlife Commission of the Northern Territory
