= Department for Environment and Water =

Department of the Government of South Australia

Department overview
- Formed: 1 July 2012
- Preceding agencies: Department of Environment, Water and Natural Resources; Department of Environment and Natural Resources; Department for Environment and Heritage; Department for Environment, Heritage and Aboriginal Affairs; Department of Environment and Natural Resources; Department of Environment and Land Management
- Jurisdiction: State of South Australia
- Headquarters: 81–95 Waymouth Street, Adelaide
- Employees: 1,393 (2023)
- Annual budget: $344.7 million
- Minister responsible: Lucy Hood, Minister for Climate, Environment and Water
- Department executive: Ben Bruce, Chief Executive
- Website: Department for Environment and Water

The Department for Environment and Water (DEW) is a department of the Government of South Australia. It is responsible for ensuring that the state of South Australia's natural resources are managed productively and sustainably, while improving the condition and resilience of the state's natural environment.

The current department was created on 1 July 2012 by the merger of the Department of Environment and Natural Resources and the Department for Water as the Department of Environment, Water and Natural Resources (DEWNR). It was given its present name on 22 March 2018.

== History of the environment portfolio ==
On 23 December 1971, a new department called the Department of Environment and Conservation was created by the amalgamation of the Museum Department and the State Planning Office which was part of the Department of the Premier and of Development.

On 18 December 1975, the Department of Environment and Conservation was renamed as the Department for the Environment following a merger with the Botanic Garden Department.

On 11 May 1981, the Department for the Environment and the Department of Urban and Regional Affairs were merged with the Department of Environment and Planning which was created on 7 August 1980 when it only consisted of the office of its first permanent head.

On 8 October 1992, the Department of Environment and Planning was abolished on 8 October 1992 and its parts were distributed to new entities including the Department of Environment and Land Management which included the entirety of the former Department of Lands which was also abolished on 8 October 1992.

On 1 October 1993, the Department of Environment and Land Management was renamed as the Department of Environment and Natural Resources.

On 23 October 1997, the Department of Environment and Natural Resources was abolished and replaced in part by the Department for Environment, Heritage and Aboriginal Affairs which also included “employees” of other abolished “Administrative Units” such as the Department of State Aboriginal Affairs and the Department of Mines and Energy.

In 1999, the Department for Environment, Heritage and Aboriginal Affairs became the Department for Environment and Heritage.

On 1 July 2010, the Department for Environment and Heritage was renamed for the second time as the Department of Environment and Natural Resources.

On 1 July 2012, the Department of Environment and Natural Resources became the Department of Environment, Water and Natural Resources (DEWNR) after acquiring the roles and responsibilities of the former Department of Water. This created the current (2024) incarnation of the department. it was given its present name on 22 March 2018. Following the Liberal Party's victory in the 2018 state election, the department was renamed as the Department for Environment and Water (DEW) on 2 March 2018.

== People ==
On 19 September 2025, Lucy Hood became Minister for Climate, Environment and Water, taking responsibility for the department, after Susan Close announced her resignation. As of February 2024, the chief executive of the department is Ben Bruce, who took over from John Schutz.

== Premier's Climate Change Council ==
The Premier's Climate Change Council was established under the Climate Change and Greenhouse Emissions Reduction Act 2007, with the inaugural council created in February 2008. The primary role of the Council is to provide independent advice to the Minister for Environment and Water on reducing greenhouse gas emissions and adapting to climate change.

== See also ==
- Friends of Parks
- List of environmental ministries
- National Parks and Wildlife Service (South Australia)
- Protected areas of South Australia
- State Herbarium of South Australia
