= Monarto =

Monarto may refer to:

- Monarto, South Australia, a locality
- Monarto Safari Park, a large open-range zoo in South Australia
- Monarto Conservation Park, a protected area in South Australia
- City of Monarto, a proposed city in South Australia in the 1970s - see Monarto, South Australia#Proposed city of Monarto
- District Council of Monarto, a former local government area that occupied the extent of Hundred of Monarto
- Hundred of Monarto, a cadastral unit

== See also ==
- Monarto South, South Australia
- Monarto Woodlands Conservation Park
- Monarto South railway station
- Monaro (disambiguation)
