= Protected areas of South Australia =

Areas protected by legislation in South Australia

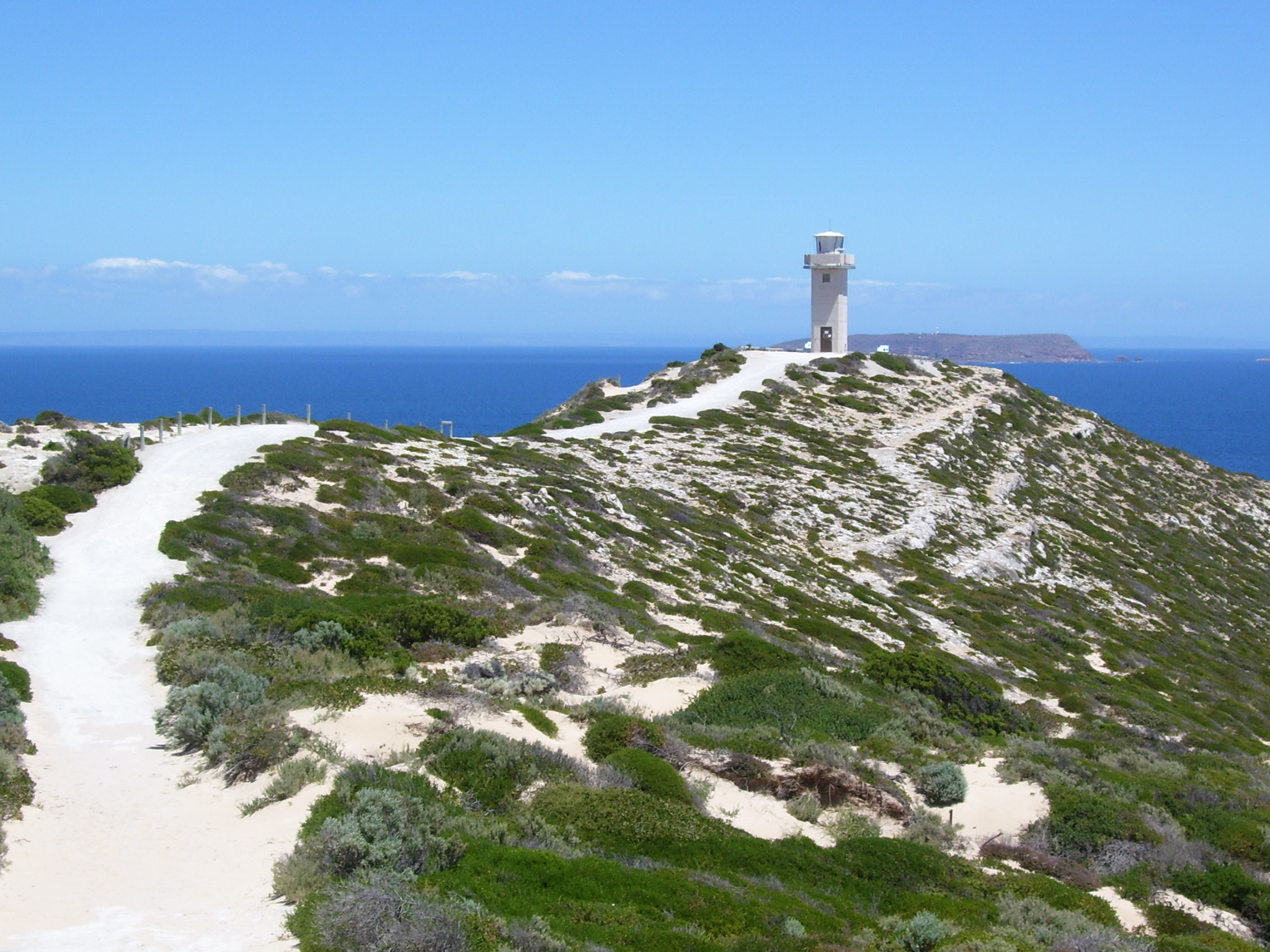
Cape Spencer Lighthouse, Innes National Park

Protected areas of South Australia, consisting of protected areas located within South Australia and its immediate onshore waters and which are managed by South Australian Government agencies. As of 2018, South Australia contained 359 separate protected areas declared under the National Parks and Wildlife Act 1972, the Crown Land Management Act 2009 and the Wilderness Protection Act 1992. Together, they cover a total land area of 211,387.48 km^{2} (81,617.16 sq mi) or 21.5% of the state's area.

== Jurisdiction ==
The jurisdiction for legislation of protected areas within South Australia and the immediate onshore waters known officially as "the coastal waters and waters within the limits of South Australia" is that of the South Australian government. The National Parks and Wildlife Act 1972 authorises the creation and management of protected areas, which form the majority of South Australia’s contribution to the National Reserve System.

Other South Australian legislation that may create protected areas includes the following: Forestry Act 1950, Wilderness Protection Act 1992, Historic Shipwrecks Act 1981, River Murray Act 2003, Adelaide Dolphin Sanctuary Act 2005, Fisheries Management Act 2007, Marine Parks Act 2007, Crown Land Management Act 2009, Arkaroola Protection Act 2012 and Native Vegetation Act 1991.

The Australian Government does not have power under the Australian constitution to legislate for protected areas within South Australia. However, its treaty obligations and its constitutional responsibilities permit the state to develop policies for protected areas and to enter into agreements concerning protected areas. Examples include nomination of sites under the Convention on Wetlands of International Importance (also known as the Ramsar Convention) and establishment of agreements for Indigenous Protected Areas.

== National Parks and Wildlife Act 1972 ==
The National Parks and Wildlife Act 1972 (also known as the National Parks Act) is the main South Australian legislation authorising the establishment and management of protected areas. (Note: The act uses the term "reserve" in lieu of the term "protected area"; the agency which administers the act generally uses the term "park".) It is concerned with the establishment and management of reserves, establishment of sanctuaries, conservation of native plants and animals, declaration of protected animals, management of protected animals in respect to taking, keeping, farming and harvesting, and control of hunting.

The act is administered by the Department for Environment and Water (DEW).

Reserves declared under this act as of 2014 totalled 320, covering an area of 19,226,432 ha (47,509,550 acres) or 19.6% of South Australia's area. As of 2021, there were 359 parks in South Australia subject to the act and national parks Regulations.

The following types of reserves are listed within the Act: national parks, conservation parks, game reserves, recreation parks and regional reserves.

=== National parks ===
National parks are "areas considered to be of national significance due to wildlife, natural features of the land, or Aboriginal or European heritage". As of May 2020, the following national parks had been declared: (Note: Updated in December 2021.)

- Adelaide International Bird Sanctuary—Winaityinaityi Pangkara
- Belair
- Canunda
- Cleland (2021)
- Coffin Bay
- Coorong
- Deep Creek (2021)
- Flinders Chase
- Gawler Ranges
- Glenthorne–Ityamaiitpinna Yarta (2020)
- Great Australian Bight Marine
- Ikara-Flinders Ranges
- Dhilba Guuranda-Innes
- Kati Thanda-Lake Eyre
- Lake Frome National Park (2021)
- Lake Gairdner
- Lake Torrens
- Lincoln
- Malkumba-Coongie Lakes
- Mount Remarkable
- Munga-Thirri–Simpson Desert (2021)
- Murray River
- Naracoorte Caves
- Nilpena Ediacara National Park
- Nullarbor
- Onkaparinga River
- Vulkathunha-Gammon Ranges
- Wapma Thura–Southern Flinders Ranges National Park (2021)
- Witjira

=== Conservation parks ===
Conservation parks are "areas protected for the purpose of conserving wildlife or the natural or historic features of the land". As of 2021, the following conservation parks had been declared: (Note: The list was updated in 2021 after five national parks had been created, incorporating several former conservation parks.)

- Aberdour
- Acraman Creek
- Aldinga Scrub
- Althorpe Islands
- Angove
- Avoid Bay Islands
- Baird Bay Islands
- Bakara
- Bandon
- Bangham
- Barwell
- Bascombe Well
- Baudin
- Baudin Rocks
- Beachport
- Beatrice Islet
- Belt Hill
- Beyeria
- Big Heath
- Billiatt
- Bimbowrie
- Bird Islands
- Black Hill
- Black Rock
- Boondina
- Brookfield
- Bullock Hill
- Busby Islet
- Butchers Gap
- Calectasia
- Calpatanna Waterhole
- Cap Island
- Cape Blanche
- Cape Gantheaume
- Cape Willoughby
- Caralue Bluff
- Carappee Hill
- Carcuma
- Caroona Creek
- Carpenter Rocks
- Carribie
- Chadinga
- Charleston
- Christmas Rocks
- Clements Gap
- Clinton
- Cocata
- Cooltong
- Corrobinnie Hill
- Cox Scrub
- Cromer
- Cudlee Creek
- Custon
- Cygnet Estuary
- Danggali
- Darke Range
- Desert Camp
- Dingley Dell
- Douglas Point
- Dudley
- Eba Island
- Elliot Price
- Eric Bonython
- Ettrick
- Ewens Ponds
- Fairview
- Ferguson
- Ferries-McDonald
- Finniss
- Fort Glanville
- Fowlers Bay
- Franklin Harbor
- Furner
- Gambier Islands
- Gawler Ranges
- Geegeela
- Giles
- Glen Roy
- Goose Island
- Gower
- Grass Tree
- Greenly Island
- Guichen Bay
- Gum Lagoon
- Gum Tree Gully
- Hacks Lagoon
- Hale
- Hallett Cove
- Hanson Scrub
- Heggaton
- Hesperilla
- Hincks
- Hogwash Bend
- Hopkins Creek
- Horsnell Gully
- Ironstone Hill
- Jip Jip
- Kaiserstuhl
- Kanku-Breakaways
- Kapunda Island
- Karte
- Kathai
- Kellidie Bay
- Kelly Hill
- Kelvin Powrie
- Kenneth Stirling
- Kinchina
- Kulliparu
- Kungari
- Kyeema
- Lake Frome (Note: Lake Frome Conservation Park is not to be confused with Lake Frome National Park, which is in the south-east of the state near Southend.)
- Lake Gilles
- Lake Hawdon South
- Lake Newland
- Lake St Clair
- Lashmar
- Lathami
- Laura Bay
- Lawari
- Lesueur
- Leven Beach
- Lincoln
- Lipson Island
- Little Dip
- Lowan
- Lower Glenelg River
- Maize Island Lagoon
- Malgra
- Mamungari
- Mantung
- Marino
- Mark Oliphant
- Marne Valley
- Martin Washpool
- Martindale Hall
- Mary Seymour
- Media Island
- Messent
- Middlecamp Hills
- Mimbara
- Minlacowie
- Moana Sands
- Mokota
- Monarto
- Monarto Woodlands
- Montacute
- Moody Tank
- Morgan
- Morialta
- Mount Billy
- Mount Boothby
- Mount Brown
- Mount Dutton Bay
- Mount George
- Mount Magnificent
- Mount Monster
- Mount Scott
- Mount Taylor
- Mowantjie Willauwar
- Mullinger Swamp
- Munyaroo
- Murrunatta
- Mylor
- Myponga
- Nene Valley
- Nepean Bay
- Neptune Islands
- Newland Head
- Ngarkat
- Ngaut Ngaut
- Nicolas Baudin Island
- Nixon-Skinner
- Nuyts Archipelago
- Nuyts Reef
- Olive Island
- Padthaway
- Pandappa
- Para Wirra
- Paranki Lagoon
- Parndana
- Peachna
- Peebinga
- Pelican Lagoon
- Penambol
- Penguin Island
- Penola
- Piccaninnie Ponds
- Pigface Island
- Pike River
- Pine Hill Soak
- Pinkawillinie
- Point Bell
- Point Davenport
- Point Labatt
- Pooginook
- Poonthie Ruwe
- Porter Scrub
- Pualco Range
- Pullen Island
- Pureba
- Ramco Point
- Ramsay
- Red Banks
- Reedy Creek
- Ridley
- Rilli Island
- Rocky Island (North)
- Rocky Island (South)
- Roonka
- Rudall
- Salt Lagoon Islands
- Sandy Creek
- Sceale Bay
- Scott
- Scott Creek
- Seal Bay
- Searcy Bay
- Seddon
- Shannon
- Sheoak Hill
- Simpson
- Sinclair Island
- Sir Joseph Banks Group
- Sleaford Mere
- Spring Gully
- Spring Mount
- Stipiturus
- Swan Reach
- Talapar
- Talisker
- Tallaringa
- Tantanoola Caves
- Telford Scrub
- The Dutchmans Stern
- The Knoll
- The Pages
- The Plug Range
- Thidna
- Tilley Swamp
- Torrens Island
- Troubridge Island
- Tucknott Scrub
- Tumby Island
- Venus Bay
- Verran Tanks
- Vivigani Ardune
- Vivonne Bay
- Wabma Kadarbu Mound Springs
- Wahgunyah
- Waitpinga
- Waldegrave Islands
- Wanilla
- Wanilla Land Settlement
- Warren
- Warrenben
- West Island
- Wharminda
- Whidbey Isles
- White Dam
- Whyalla
- Wiljani
- Wills Creek
- Winninowie
- Wittelbee
- Woakwine
- Wolseley Common
- Yalpara
- Yeldulknie
- Yulte
- Yumbarra

Former conservation parks include Cape Hart, Cape Torrens, Cleland, Ediacara, Eurilla, Investigator Group, Isles of St Francis, Mount Rescue, Mount Shaugh, Munga-Thirri–Simpson Desert Conservation Park, Naracoorte Caves, Port Gawler and Scorpion Springs, Spaniards Gully, Telowie Gorge, Western River, and Wirrabara Range.

=== Game reserves ===
Game reserves are "areas set aside for conservation of wildlife and the management of game for seasonal hunting". As of 2018, the following game reserves had been declared:

- Bool Lagoon
- Bucks Lake
- Chowilla
- Currency Creek
- Lake Robe
- Loch Luna
- Moorook
- Mud Islands
- Poocher Swamp
- Tolderol

Former game reserves include Coorong and Katarapko.

=== Recreation parks ===
Recreation parks are "areas managed for public recreation and enjoyment in a natural setting". As of March 2018, the following recreation parks have been declared:

- Anstey Hill
- Blackwood Forest
- Brownhill Creek
- Caratoola
- Cobbler Creek
- Granite Island
- Greenhill
- Long Island
- O'Halloran Hill
- Onkaparinga River
- Shepherds Hill
- Sturt Gorge
- Totness

=== Regional reserves ===
Regional reserves are "areas proclaimed for the purpose of conserving wildlife or natural or historical features while allowing responsible use of the area's natural resources". As of 2021, the following regional reserves had been declared:

- Chowilla
- Innamincka
- Nullarbor
- Strzelecki
- Yellabinna

== Other South Australian legislation ==
=== Conservation reserves ===
Conservation reserves are a parcels of "land set aside for conservation of natural and cultural features under the Crown Land Management Act 2009". As of 2018, the following conservation reserves had been declared:

- Bernouilli
- Buckleboo
- Bunbury
- Bunkers
- Cortlinye
- Cox Scrub
- Cunyarie
- Desert Camp
- Hardings Springs
- Lacroma
- Moongi
- Mootra
- Pinkawillinie Reservoir
- Poolgarra
- Tola

As of 2018, reserves declared under the Crown Land Management Act 2009 totalled 15, covering a total area of 19,471 ha (48,110 acres) or less than 0.1% of South Australia’s area.

=== Native forest reserves ===
The Forestry Act 1950 allows for the declaration of forest reserves for "purposes relating to the conservation, development and management of land supporting native flora and fauna ...". Native forest reserves are administered by the South Australian Forestry Corporation (trading as ForestrySA) which is a wholly owned state government business. As of 2014, the following native forest reserves, located in the Southern Flinders Ranges, the Mount Lofty Ranges and the Limestone Coast, had been declared:

- Bagdad
- Boolara
- Burr Slopes South
- Cave Range
- Christmas Hill
- Comaum
- Congeratinga
- Coralinga
- Cudlee Creek
- Deadmans Swamp
- Dry Creek
- Gillap North
- Gillap South
- Glencoe Hill
- Grundy Lane
- Hacket Hill
- Hells Hole
- Honan
- Honeysuckle
- Island Swamp
- Kalumunda
- Kangaroo Flat
- Kay
- Kennion
- Kersbrook
- King Tree
- Knott Hill
- Konetta
- Laslett
- Little Mt. Crawford
- Long
- Malone Heath
- McRosties
- Mount Benson
- Mount Gawler
- Mount McIntyre
- Mount Panorama
- Mount Watch
- Muddy Flat
- Nangwarry
- Native Wells
- Overland Track
- Pond Flat
- Rock Shelter
- Rocky Reserve
- Round Waterhole
- Snow Gum
- Springs Road
- The Bluff
- The Heath
- The Marshes
- The Woolwash
- Topperwein
- Tower Hill
- Wandilo
- Warreanga
- Watts Gully
- Whennen
- White Waterhole
- Windy Hill
- Wombat Flat

=== Wilderness protection areas ===
The Wilderness Protection Act 1992 was established in 1992 to provide for "the protection of wilderness and the restoration of land to its condition before European colonisation". The day-to-day administration of the act is carried out by DEW. As of 2018, the following areas had been declared:

- Billiatt
- Cape Bouguer
- Cape Gantheaume
- Cape Torrens
- Danggali
- Hambidge
- Hincks
- Investigator Group
- Memory Cove
- Nullarbor
- Nuyts Archipelago
- Ravine des Casoars
- Western River
- Yellabinna

As of 2018, reserves declared under the Wilderness Protection Act 1992 totalled 14, covering an area of 1,843,454 ha (4,555,270 acres) or 1.9% of South Australia’s area.

=== Protected zones for historic shipwreck sites ===
The Historic Shipwrecks Act 1981, which is administered by DEW, allows for the creation of protected zones over land and water around historic shipwrecks. The following protected zones have been declared:

- HMAS Hobart Shipwreck Reserve
- Zanoni Shipwreck Reserve

=== River Murray protection area ===
The River Murray Act 2003, which is administered by DEW, has provision for "the protection and enhancement of the River Murray and related areas and ecosystems". As of 2010, the following protection areas had been designated:

- the floodplain of the River Murray within South Australia including Lake Alexandrina, Lake Albert and the Coorong
- the watershed of the following tributaries arising from the east side of the Mount Lofty Ranges – Marne, Bremer and Finniss rivers.

=== Aquatic reserves ===
Aquatic reserves have been declared under the Fisheries Management Act 2007 (SA) and are managed by Primary Industries and Regions SA (PIRSA). They were established "to protect the habitat, ecosystems and communities of the rich variety of underwater organisms found in the marine and estuarine waters of South Australia". The reserves, which are considered to be IUCN Category II protected areas, are as follows:

- American River
- Aldinga Reef
- Bales Beach
- Barker Inlet-St Kilda
- Blanche Harbour-Douglas Bank
- Coobowie
- Whyalla - Cowleds Landing
- Goose Island
- Great Australian Bight Marine Park Whale Sanctuary
- Point Labatt
- Port Noarlunga Reef
- Seal Bay
- St Kilda – Chapman Creek
- Troubridge Hill
- West Island Encounter Bay
- Yatala Harbour Upper Spencer Gulf

=== Adelaide Dolphin Sanctuary ===
Adelaide Dolphin Sanctuary (ADS) is a sanctuary area intended to protect the Indo-Pacific bottlenose dolphin (Tursiops aduncus) population residing in the Port Adelaide River estuary and Barker Inlet as well as protecting and enhancing the Port Adelaide River estuary and Barker Inlet. The sanctuary was declared under the Adelaide Dolphin Sanctuary Act 2005 and is managed by DEW.

=== Marine parks ===
Marine parks are marine protected areas located within the immediate onshore waters of SA set aside under the Marine Parks Act 2007 (SA) "to preserve the biological diversity of the state's coastal, estuarine and marine environments while allowing ecologically sustainable use of the area's natural resources". As of 2013, the following marine parks had been declared:

- Far West Coast Marine Park
- Nuyts Archipelago Marine Park
- West Coast Bays Marine Park
- Investigator Marine Park
- Thorny Passage Marine Park
- Sir Joseph Banks Group Marine Park
- Neptune Islands Group (Ron and Valerie Taylor) Marine Park
- Gambier Islands Group Marine Park
- Franklin Harbor Marine Park
- Upper Spencer Gulf Marine Park
- Eastern Spencer Gulf Marine Park
- Southern Spencer Gulf Marine Park
- Lower Yorke Peninsula Marine Park
- Upper Gulf St Vincent Marine Park
- Encounter Marine Park
- Western Kangaroo Island Marine Park
- Southern Kangaroo Island Marine Park
- Upper South East Marine Park
- Lower South East Marine Park

=== Arkaroola protection area ===
The Arkaroola Protection Act 2012, which commenced operation on 26 April 2012, was created to "establish the Arkaroola Protection Area; to provide for the proper management and care of the area; and to prohibit mining activities in the area". The protection area, located 600 km (370 mi) north of Adelaide, includes the Arkaroola Pastoral Lease and the Mawson Plateau part of the Mount Freeling Pastoral Lease. The former lease, which has not been stocked for more than 30 years, is operated for the purpose of conservation and tourism under the name, Arkaroola Wilderness Sanctuary. The protection area is reported as satisfying the definition of a "category II National Park".

=== Native vegetation heritage agreements ===
A native vegetation heritage agreements, usually known as a heritage agreement, is a legally binding agreement between a landowner and the Minister for Environment, Sustainability and Conservation in which the landowner agrees to protect native vegetation in perpetuity. In return, the Minister may agree to reduce statutory fees such as local government rates or offer assistance in terms of funding of works such as fencing or provision of expert advice to "protecting and improving the conservation value of the heritage agreement area". The enabling legislation is the Native Vegetation Act 1991. Land covered by heritage agreements is considered to meet IUCN Category III. As of 2014, 1537 agreements in respect to 634,242 hectares (1,567,250 acres) of land within SA, equivalent to 0.64% of the area of SA, had been entered into between landowners and the minister. A notable example is the Gluepot Reserve.

== Australian government ==
=== World heritage site ===
As of 2015, Naracoorte Caves National Park was the sole World Heritage Site located in South Australia. It was co-listed under the name "Australian Fossil Mammal Sites (Riversleigh/Naracoorte)" together with Riversleigh, Queensland, in 1994. The listing acknowledged the fossil assemblages present at both sites to be a "superb illustration of the key stages of evolution of Australia’s unique fauna".

=== Ramsar sites ===
As a contracting party to the Convention on Wetlands of International Importance (known as the Ramsar Convention), Australia is encouraged "to nominate sites containing representative, rare or unique wetlands, or that are important for conserving biological diversity, to the List of Wetlands of International Importance". As of 2014, the Australian Government had nominated the following Ramsar sites within South Australia:

- Banrock Station Wetland Complex
- Bool and Hacks Lagoons
- Coongie Lakes
- Coorong and Lakes Alexandrina and Albert Wetland
- Piccaninnie Ponds Karst Wetlands
- Riverland.

=== Indigenous protected areas ===
An Indigenous protected area encompasses a voluntary agreement between owners of indigenous-owned land (known as traditional owners) and the Australian government. It is intended to "promote biodiversity and cultural resource conservation on indigenous owned land". As of 2014, there were six within South Australia:

- Antara-Sandy Bore
- Kalka-Pipalyatjara
- Mount Willoughby
- Nantawarrina
- Watarru and Walalkara
- Yalata.

=== Biosphere reserves ===
Two biosphere reserves belonging to the UNESCO World Biosphere Reserve program are located within South Australia: the Mamungari Conservation Park and the Riverland Biosphere Reserve.

The Mamungari Conservation Park in western South Australia, formerly known as the Unnamed Conservation Park, is co-managed by its traditional owners and DEW.

The Riverland Biosphere Reserve is located in the Riverland near Renmark. Two of its components are Calperum and Taylorville stations, which were respectively purchased by the Chicago Zoological Society in 1993 and the Australian Landscape Trust in 2000, with ownership being deeded to the Director of National Parks. Both properties are managed by the Australian Landscape Trust.

== See also ==
- Protected areas of Australia
- Friends of Parks
- List of protected areas in Adelaide
- National Parks and Wildlife Service (South Australia)
- Great Australian Bight Marine Park

Privately held reserves in South Australia

- Bon Bon Reserve
- Boolcoomatta Reserve
- Buckaringa Sanctuary
- Dakalanta Sanctuary
- Gluepot Reserve
- Kalamurina Sanctuary
- Moorunde Wildlife Reserve
- Nurragi Conservation Reserve
- Secret Rocks Nature Reserve
- Watervalley Wetlands
- Witchelina
- Warrawong Sanctuary
- Yookamurra Sanctuary
