= Sinclair Island =

Sinclair Island may refer to:

- Sinclair Island (Antarctica)
- Sinclair Island (Namibia)
- Sinclair Island (Queensland), Australia
- Sinclair Island (South Australia)
- Sinclair Island (Washington), USA

== See also ==
- Sinclair Islet, Queensland, Australia
