= Penicillium grevilleicola =

Scientific classification
- Domain: Eukaryota
- Kingdom: Fungi
- Division: Ascomycota
- Class: Eurotiomycetes
- Order: Eurotiales
- Family: Aspergillaceae
- Genus: Penicillium
- Species: P. grevilleicola

Binomial name
- Penicillium grevilleicola Houbraken & Quaedvlieg 2014

Type strain
- CBS 137775, DTO 174-E6>

Species of fungus

Penicillium grevilleicola is a species of the genus of Penicillium which was isolated from Grevillea ilicifolia.
