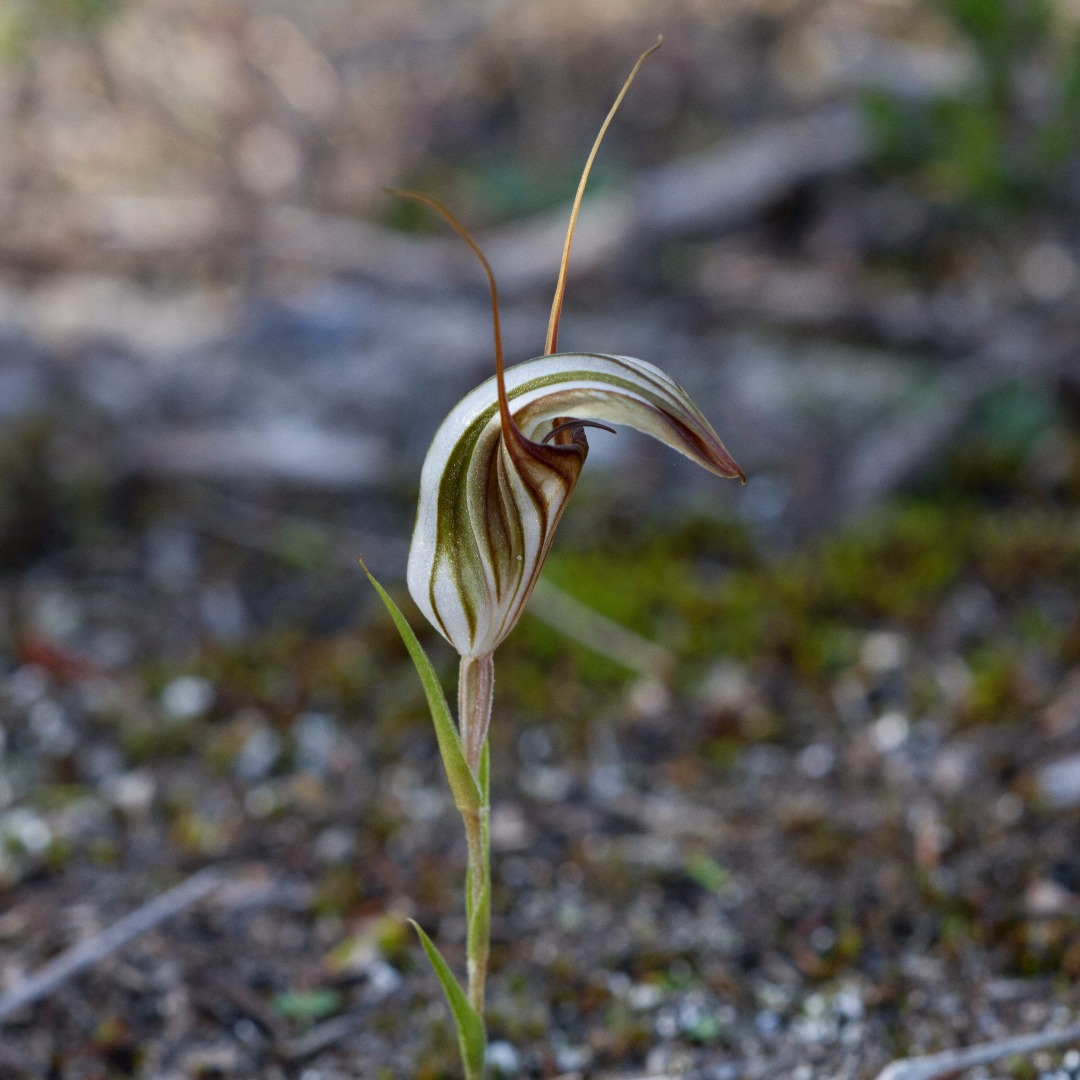
- Pterostylis dolichochila growing in the Monarto Conservation Park

Scientific classification
- Kingdom: Plantae
- Clade: Tracheophytes
- Clade: Angiosperms
- Clade: Monocots
- Order: Asparagales
- Family: Orchidaceae
- Subfamily: Orchidoideae
- Tribe: Cranichideae
- Genus: Pterostylis
- Species: P. dolichochila

Binomial name
- Pterostylis dolichochila D.L.Jones & M.A.Clem.

Synonyms
- Diplodium dolichochila (D.L.Jones & M.A.Clem.) D.L.Jones & M.A.Clem.

= Pterostylis dolichochila =

Long-tongued shell orchid

Species of orchid

Pterostylis dolichochila, commonly known as the long-tongued shell orchid, is a species of orchid endemic to southern Australia. As with similar orchids, the flowering plants differ from those which are not flowering. The non-flowering plants have a rosette of leaves but the flowering plants have a single flower with leaves on the flowering spike. This greenhood has a green and white flower with reddish-brown stripes and a sharply pointed dorsal sepal.

== Description ==
Pterostylis dolichochila is a terrestrial, perennial, deciduous, herb with an underground tuber and when not flowering, a rosette of four to ten egg-shaped leaves. Each leaf is 4–12 mm long and 3–8 mm wide. Flowering plants have a single flower 20–25 mm long and 7–9 mm wide borne on a spike 50–150 mm high with three or four stem leaves wrapped around it. The flowers are green and white with reddish-brown stripes. The dorsal sepal and petals are fused, forming a hood or "galea" over the column. The dorsal sepal curves forward with sharp point or a thread-like tip 1–2 mm long. The lateral sepals are held closely against the galea, have an erect, thread-like tip 15–20 mm long and a broad, flat sinus between their bases. The labellum is 13–15 mm long, about 4 mm wide, brown, blunt, and curved and protrudes above the sinus. Flowering occurs from April to August.

== Taxonomy and naming ==
Pterostylis dolichochila was first formally described in 1985 by David Jones and Mark Clements and the description was published in the fourth edition of Flora of South Australia. The specific epithet (dolichochila) is derived from the Ancient Greek words dolichos meaning "long" and cheilos meaning "lip".

== Distribution and habitat ==
The long-tongued shell orchid grows on calcareous sand and limestone, sometimes forming large colonies, in mallee in the south-east of South Australia and the Little Desert and Big Desert areas of Victoria.
