= Yorke Peninsula =

- Region
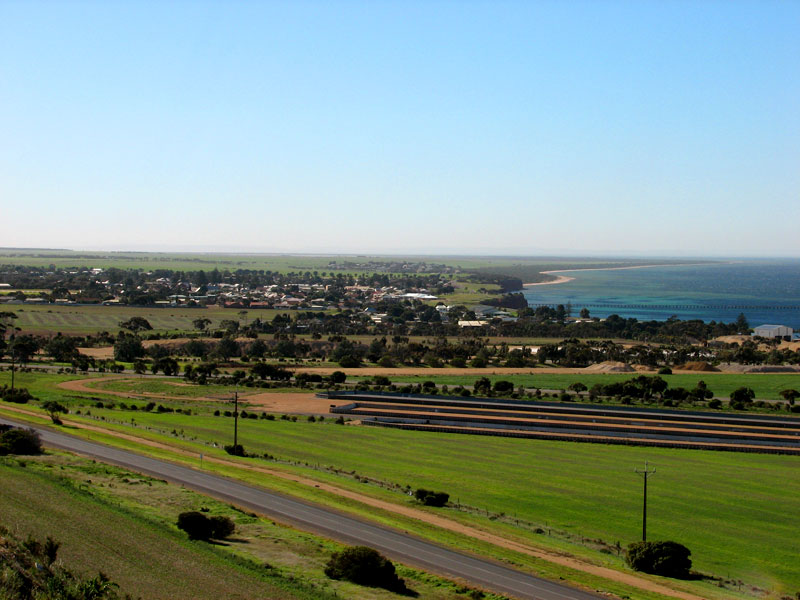
- The town of Ardrossan, located in Yorke Peninsula

- Coordinates: 34°21′0″S 137°37′0″E
- Country: Australia
- State: South Australia
- LGAs: Yorke Peninsula Council; Copper Coast Council; District Council of Barunga West
- Established: 1840s

Government
  - State electorate: Frome Narungga
  - Federal division: Grey

Area
  - Total: 8,900 km^{2} (3,400 sq mi)

Population
  - Total: 25,143 (2005)
  - Density: 2.825/km^{2} (7.32/sq mi)
- Website: Yorke Peninsula

The Yorke Peninsula, known as Guuranda by the original inhabitants, the Narungga people, is a peninsula located northwest and west of Adelaide in South Australia, between Spencer Gulf on the west and Gulf St Vincent on the east. The peninsula is separated from Kangaroo Island to the south by Investigator Strait.

The most populous town in the region is Kadina; Maitland is the most central town; and the south-western tip is occupied by Dhilba Guuranda-Innes National Park.

== History ==
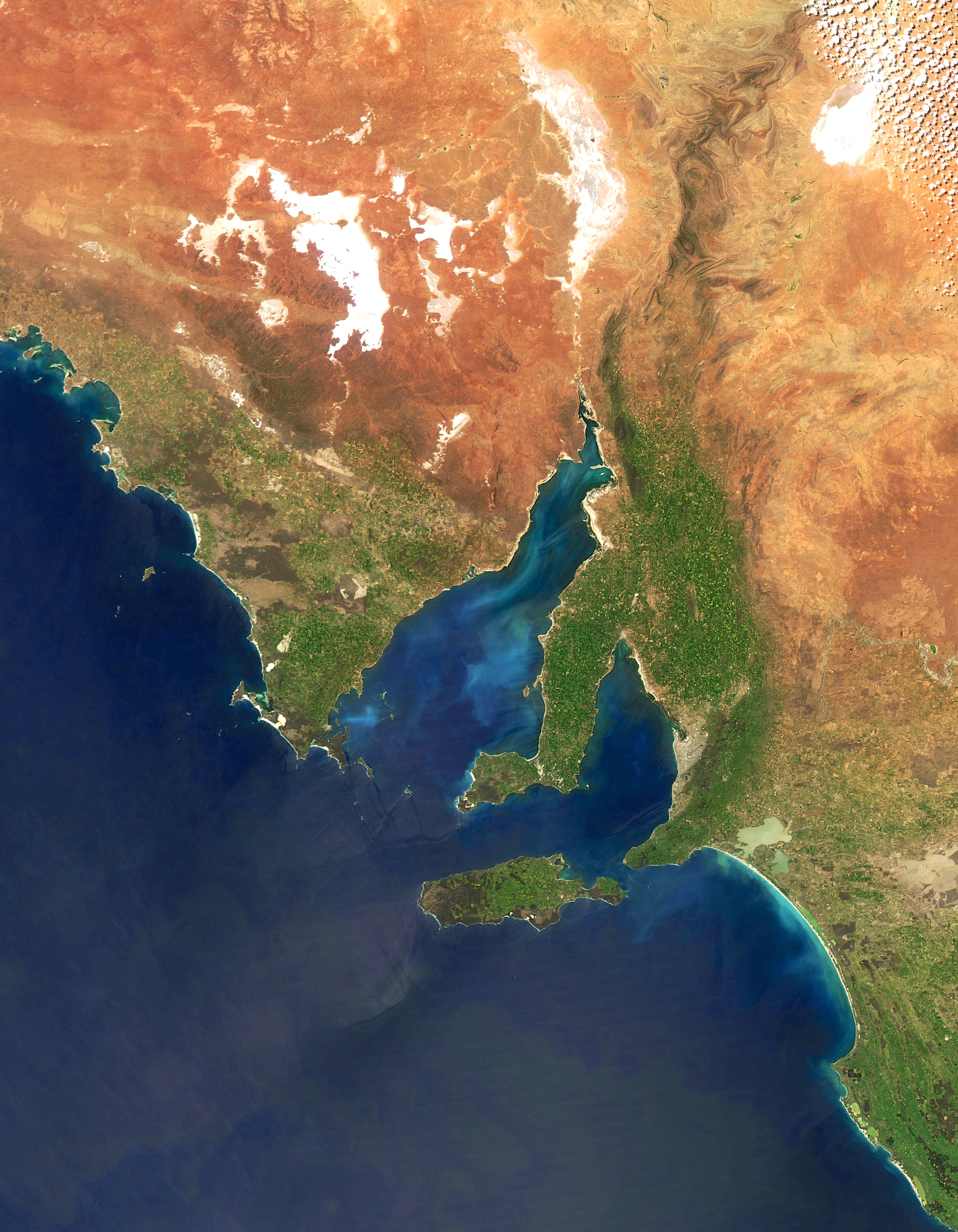
Yorke Peninsula is the central, boot-shaped peninsula above the island and between the two inlets

Prior to European settlement of the area commencing around 1840, following the British colonisation of South Australia, Yorke Peninsula was the home to the Narungga people. This Aboriginal Australian nation are the traditional owners of the land, and comprised four clans sharing the peninsula, known as Guuranda: Kurnara in the north, Dilpa in the south, Wari in the west, and Windarra in the east. The Narungga people also had names for the locations of many towns on the peninsula, such as Maggiwarda for Maitland. Today the descendants of these people still live on Yorke Peninsula, supported by the Narungga Aboriginal Progress Association in Maitland, and in the community at Point Pearce.

It was named "Yorke's Peninsula" by Captain Matthew Flinders, after Charles Philip Yorke (later Lord Hardwicke), narrowly beating French navigator Captain Nicolas Baudin, who preferred the name "Cambaceres Peninsula".

== Geography ==
=== Physiography ===
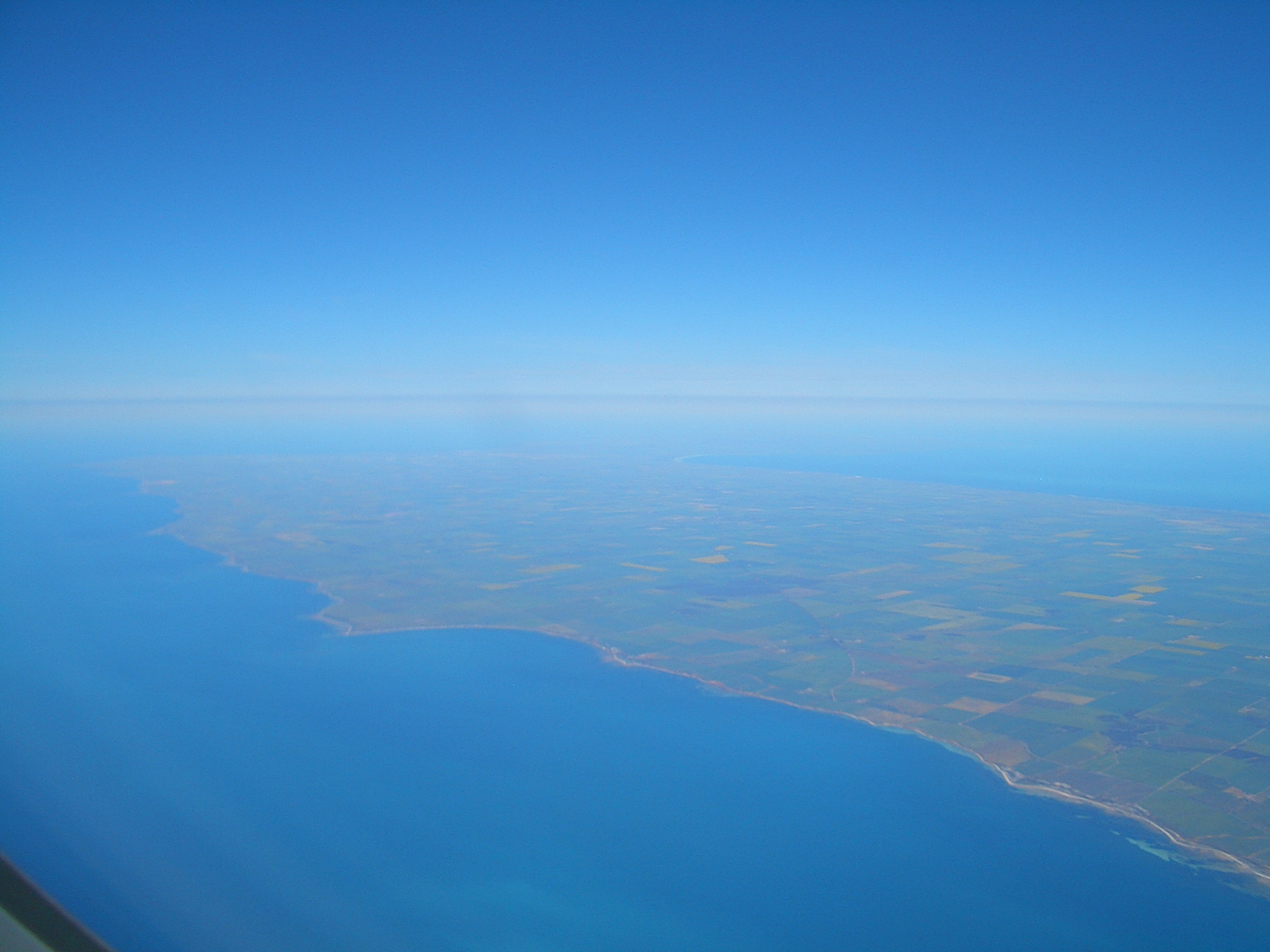
Aerial view of Yorke Peninsula, looking south from around Ardrossan. Gulf St Vincent is in the foreground, Spencer Gulf in the background. The "foot" of the "boot" can be discerned near the horizon

The area is also known as the Yorke Horst, which is distinct physiographic section of the larger South Australian Shatter Belt province, which in turn is part of the larger West Australian Shield, a physiographic division describing a geological feature known as a shield. Along with Cape Eyre the peninsula is also part of the Eyre Yorke Block bioregion.

=== Topography ===
Most of Yorke Peninsula is prime agricultural land, with mostly small rolling hills and flat plains. The southern end of the Hummocks Range partially extends down the top of the peninsula, flattening out near Clinton. The highest point on the peninsula is 5 kilometres (3.1 mi) north-east of Maitland, although some debate remains as to where the peninsula borders the Mid-North, and part of the steep Hummocks terrain may be considered part of the peninsula.

A series of shallow valleys lines the interior of the peninsula, with the main one called the Yorke Valley extending roughly from Sunnyvale, south of Paskeville through to Ramsey, between Minlaton and Stansbury. The predominant Yorke Valley area lies roughly in the area between Arthurton, Maitland, Ardrossan, and Curramulka.

The southern tip, sometimes termed the "foot", is surrounded on three sides by the ocean, and forms a 170,000-hectare (420,000-acre) isolated "mainland island", with large tracts of excellent native vegetation.

=== Towns ===
Principal towns include the Copper Coast towns of Kadina, Moonta and Wallaroo; farming centres of Maitland, Minlaton and Yorketown; and the port of Ardrossan. A number of smaller coastal towns are popular destinations for fishing and holidays, particularly for people from Adelaide.

The south-western tip is occupied by Dhilba Guuranda-Innes National Park.

== Climate ==
Typical of the southern coastal areas of the state and influenced by the surrounding bodies of water, Yorke Peninsula has a Mediterranean climate, (Koppen: borderline Csa/Csb), with some areas bordering a semi-arid climate, with hot, dry summer and cool, wet winter seasons. Maximum temperatures in summer average around 30°C and in winter average around 12–15°C.

Due to the surrounding bodies of water, winter temperatures are moderated and milder than most of the state, with overnight temperatures rarely falling below zero, making frost relatively uncommon in the region. Northerly winds from the desert can bring temperatures above 40°C in summer and occasionally bring very warm winter days well into the 20s. Average precipitation is 4–600 mm, most of which falls from mid-April through to September, though total and seasonal rainfall can vary greatly from year to year. Along with most of southern Australia, monsoonal lows from the north occasionally bring heavy storm events during spring and summer; rainfall is otherwise light and unreliable due to high pressure systems dominating the area.

== Agriculture ==
Yorke Peninsula is a major producer of grain, particularly barley. Historically, this has been sent out by sea because no rail serves the area. Most coastal towns on the peninsula have substantial jetties. In the past, these were used by ketches, schooners, and later steamships, to collect the grain in bags, and deliver fertiliser and other supplies. As roads in the region improved, and freight-handling techniques changed from bags to bulk, this became obsolete. A deep-water port was opened in 1970 near the south-eastern tip at Port Giles to export grain in bulk, and almost all the other ports ceased to be used for freight in the 1950s and 1960s. The only other ports with bulk-handling facilities are Wallaroo at the north-western side and Ardrossan at the top of Gulf St Vincent, also used to ship dolomite from a nearby mine for OneSteel. Maitland has a grain-receiving depot operated by AWB, serviced only by road.

Wine production commenced on the peninsula during the 1990s, taking advantage of the rich, grey, limestone-based soil.

=== Yorke Peninsula Field Days ===
Acknowledged as Australia's oldest field days, the Yorke Peninsula Field Days have been held since 1894. The Yorke Peninsula Field Days site just outside Paskeville is a hive of agricultural activity every two years at the end of September.

== Transport ==
Access from Adelaide is by road, and a regular bus service operates from the capital to main towns on the peninsula and between some of the towns. An estimated two and a half hours are needed to drive from end to end and about 30–40 minutes across the peninsula. No traffic lights are used on the peninsula.

In December 2006, Sea SA operated the first ferry service across the Spencer Gulf, between Wallaroo and Lucky Bay, near Cowell on Eyre Peninsula, and this service continued until at least late 2015. As of 2021 a daily ferry service is operated by Spencer Gulf Searoad.

== Flora and fauna ==
A programme, "Baiting for biodiversity", involving making discounted fox baits available to landowners, in order to reduce the threat of introduced foxes to native fauna, has been running across 170,000 hectares (420,000 acres) of the peninsula since 2014. The programme has been successful in helping to protect native species, such as the western pygmy possum, tammar wallaby including threatened species such as the hooded plover, mallee fowl and fairy tern. Bush stone-curlews had returned to the peninsula after not being seen there for 40 years.

In 2003, the Monarto Zoo temporarily housed 85 mainland tammar wallaby from New Zealand, awaiting reintroduction to the Dhilba Guuranda-Innes National Park, after they had been locally extinct there for some time. By 2012, four releases had been made, and the population increased to 100–120 animals.

=== Protected areas ===
The following statutory reserves are located within the peninsula or immediately adjoin its coastline:

- National parks - Dhilba Guuranda-Innes National Park
- Conservation parks - Althorpe Islands, Bird Islands, Carribie, Clinton, Leven Beach, Minlacowie, Point Davenport, Ramsay, Thidna, Troubridge Island, Warrenben and Wills Creek.
- Aquatic reserves - Coobowie Aquatic Reserve

Yorke Peninsula also hosts two important bird areas (IBAs): the Gulf St Vincent Important Bird Area and the Southern Yorke Peninsula Important Bird Area. The Gulf St Vincent IBA covers a strip of intertidal land from Ardrossan to the head of Gulf St Vincent and onto the east coast of the gulf. The Southern Yorke Peninsula IBA covers most of the southern western tip of the peninsula and overlaps Dhilba Guuranda-Innes National Park and Warrenben Conservation Park.

=== Marna Banggara ===
Marna Banggara, formerly known as the Great Southern Ark, is a grand project starting in 2019 to restore the landscape and ecology of the southern Yorke Peninsula, by reintroducing around 20 locally extinct species. The 25-kilometre (16 mi) fence across the peninsula, isolating a 170,000-hectare (420,000-acre) "mainland island", will limit predation of both native species and livestock such as lambs by feral cats and red foxes. Some work on controlling foxes had been carried out around 2006, in preparation for the return of tammar wallabies to Dhilba Guuranda-Innes National Park, but the fence was to expand the area of control.

The geography of the southern tip of the peninsula makes it an excellent location for species reintroduction, as it is surrounded by the ocean on three sides. The area already possesses good native vegetation and is isolated. Marna Banggara is funded through the Northern and Yorke Landscape Board, the federal government’s National Landcare Program, the South Australian Department for Environment and Water, WWF-Australia, and the Foundation for National Parks and Wildlife, and many organisations have been actively involved in developing the project.

Twenty woylies, or brush-tailed bettongs, were the first species reintroduced in the area, translocated from Wedge Island in June 2021, with another 80 to follow over time. The woylies are to be the first of a number of locally extinct species which are being considered for reintroduction, including the greater bilby, southern brown bandicoot, red-tailed phascogale, bush rat, Mitchell's hopping mouse, heath mouse, brush tailed possum, numbat, western quoll and unspecified dunnart species.

== In the arts ==
The work Guuranda, directed by Narungga/Kaurna man Jacob Boehme, premiered at Her Majesty's Theatre, Adelaide, as part of the 2024 Adelaide Festival. The work, which comprises three sections, each relating to a local creation story, includes dance, puppetry, and songs.

== Notable residents ==
=== Politics ===
- Harry Bartlett (1835–1915) MHA for Yorke Peninsula 1887–1896, dubbed "Father of the West Coast".
- Cecil Hincks - MHA for the Electoral district of Yorke Peninsula 1941-63
- John Olsen - former Premier of South Australia
- Leslie Heath - South Australian Member of Parliament and Horse Racing Administrator.

=== Sports ===
- Hannah Button - Adelaide footballer
- Richard Champion - former AFL footballer
- Adam Goodes - former AFL footballer and dual Brownlow Medal winner
- George Hewett - Sydney footballer
- Malcolm Karpany - West Coast Eagles footballer
- Sarah Klau - Adelaide Thunderbirds netballer
- Sam Jacobs - Adelaide footballer
- Scott McMahon - North Melbourne footballer
- Jarrad Redden - former AFL footballer
- Jamie Tape - former AFL footballer
- Jay Schulz - former AFL footballer
- Bernie Vince - Melbourne footballer

=== Other people ===
- Mary Anne Lockwood - first president of the Yorke Peninsula District Woman's Christian Temperance Union
- Fiona O'Loughlin - comedian
- Emily Taheny - actress
- Air Chief Marshal Sir Richard Williams, commonly referred to as "Father of the RAAF" was born at Moonta Mines.

== Gallery ==
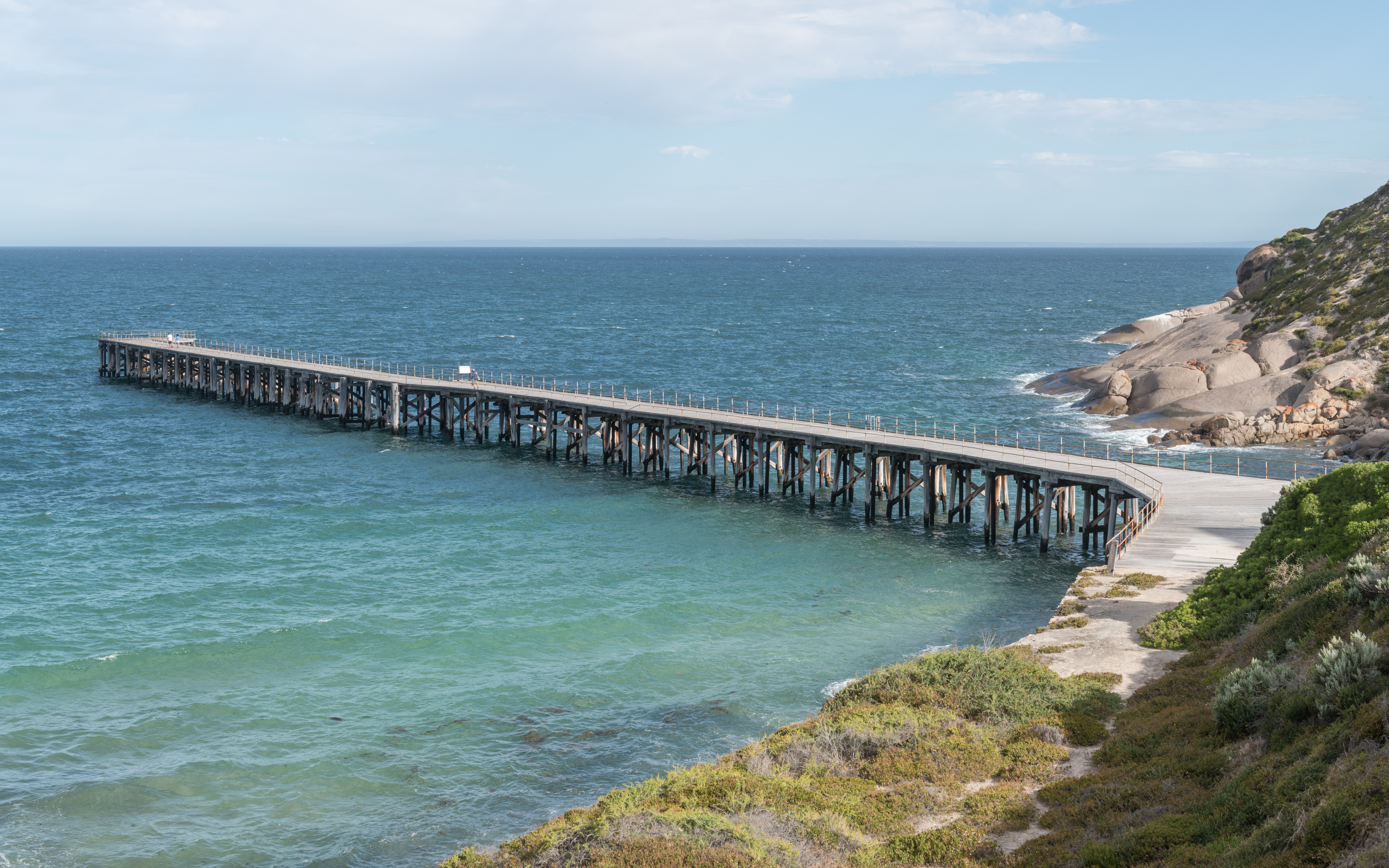
Stenhouse Bay Jetty

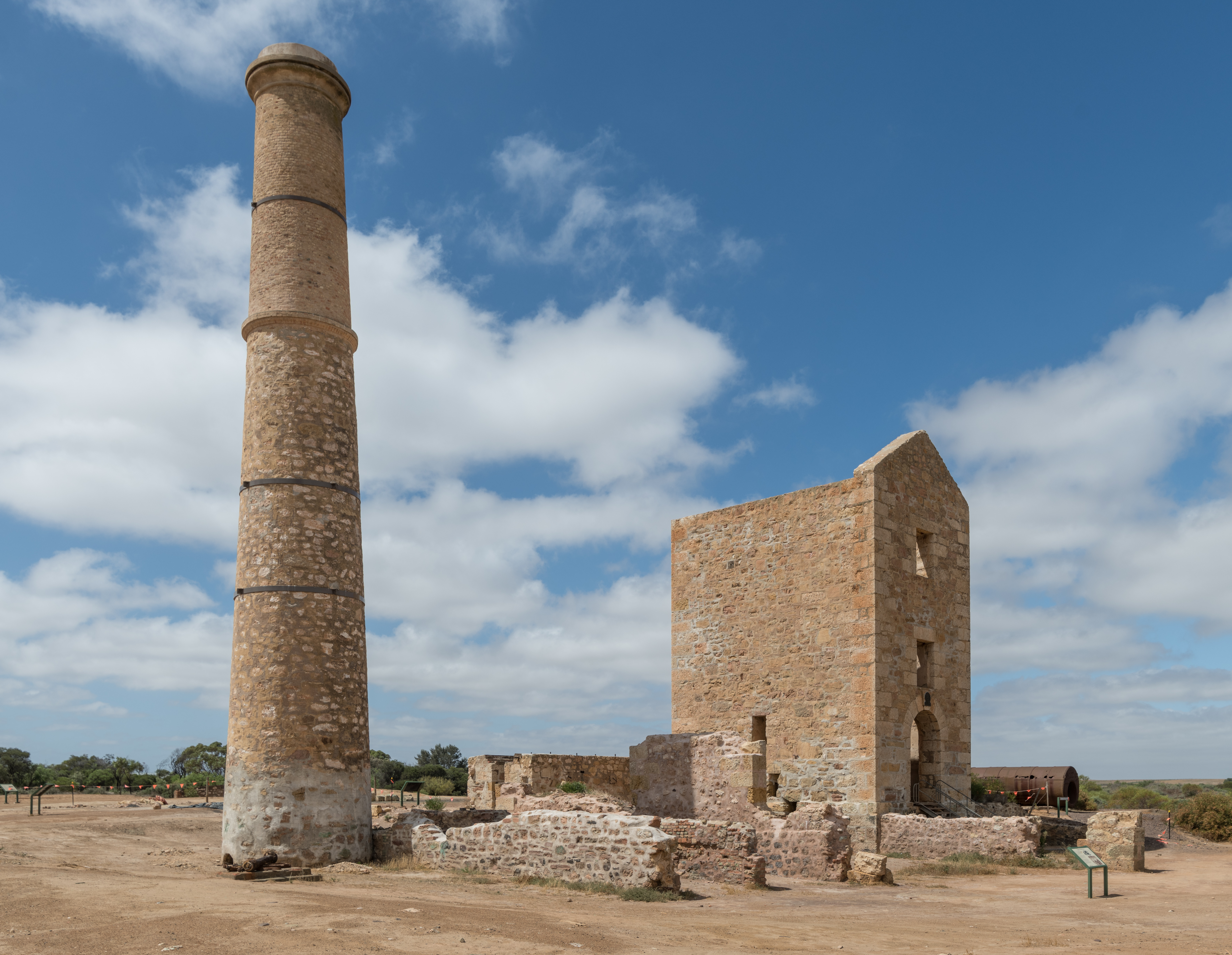
Moonta Mines

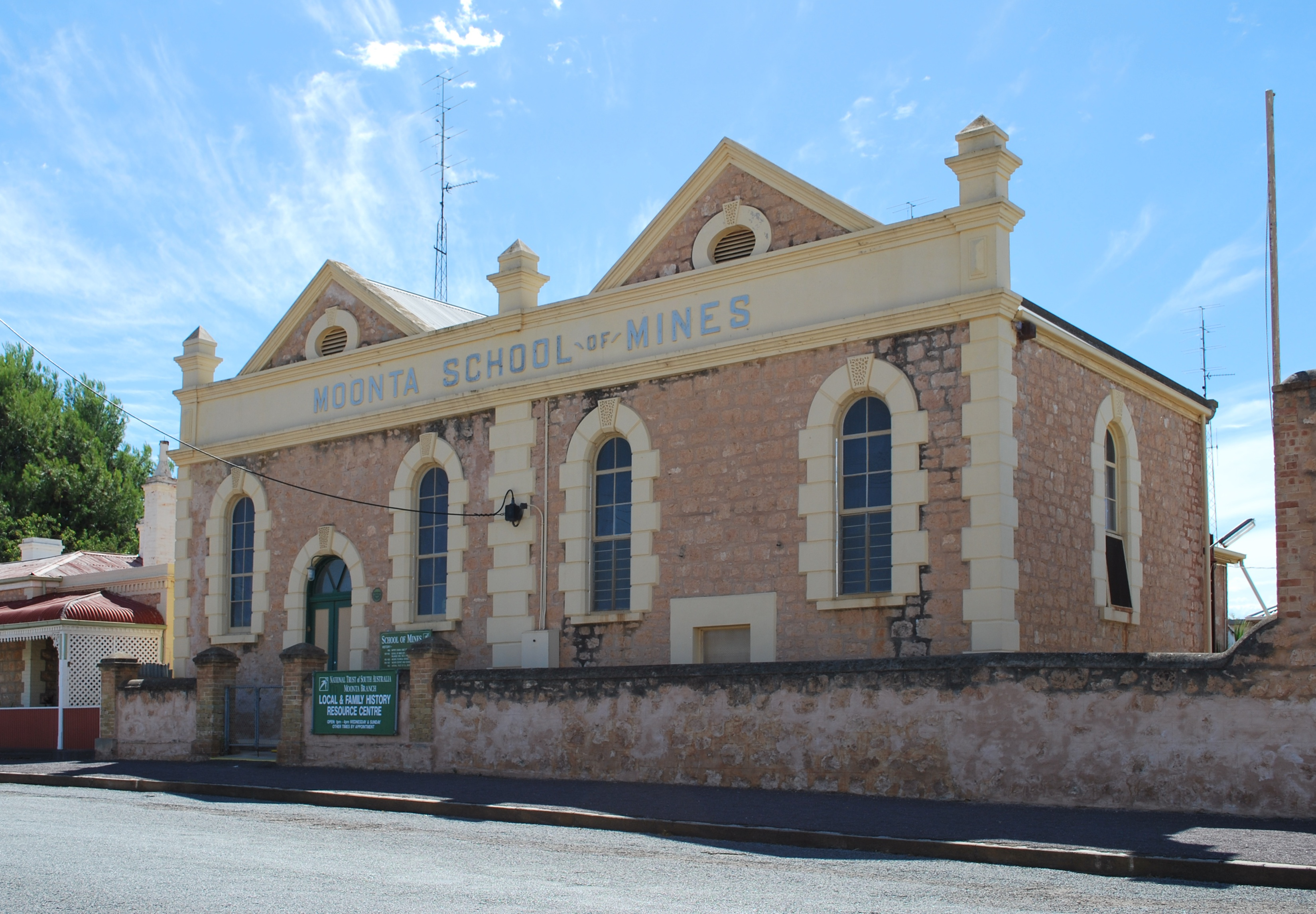
School of Mines, Moonta

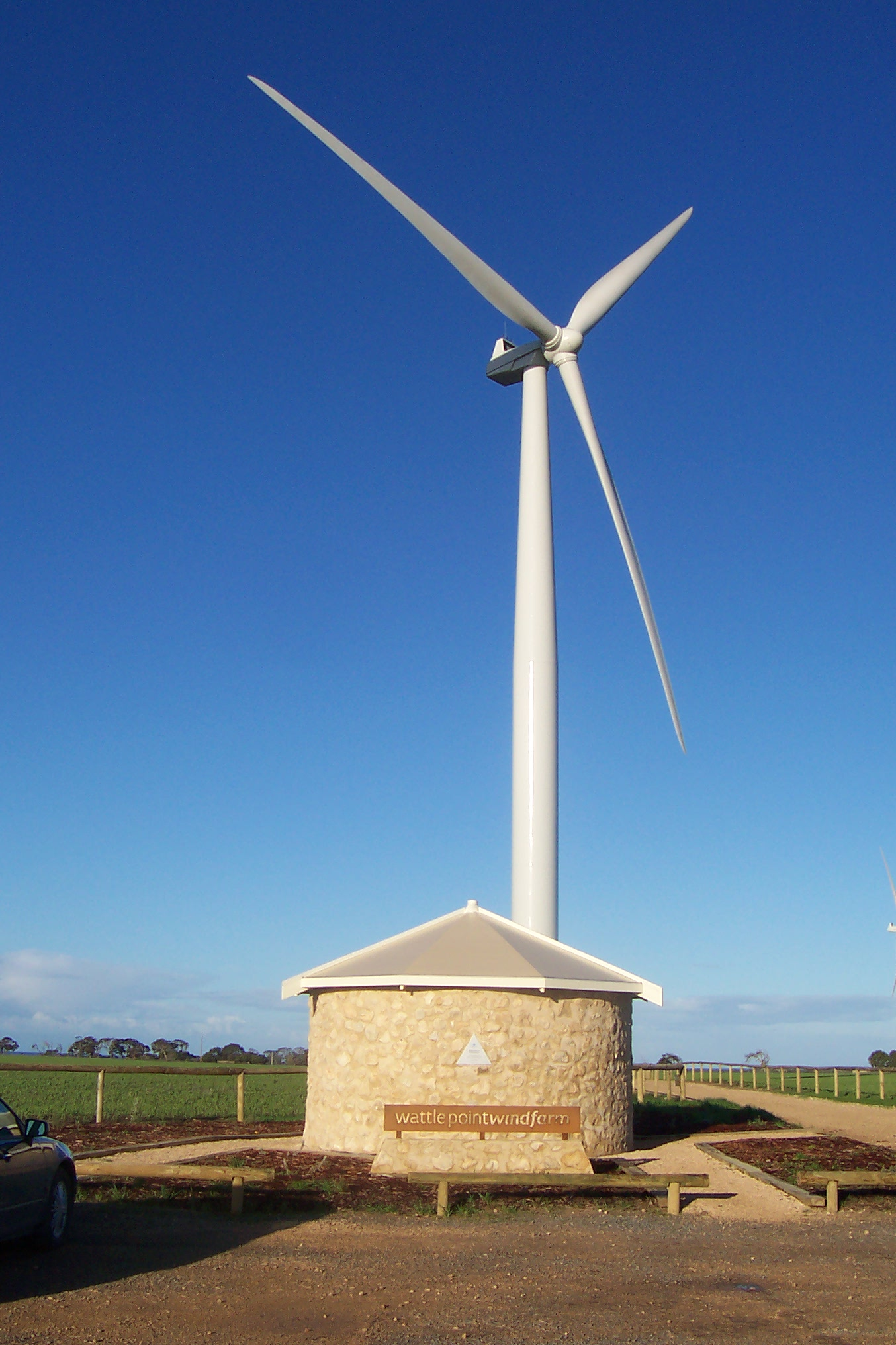
Wattle Point Wind Farm, near Edithburgh

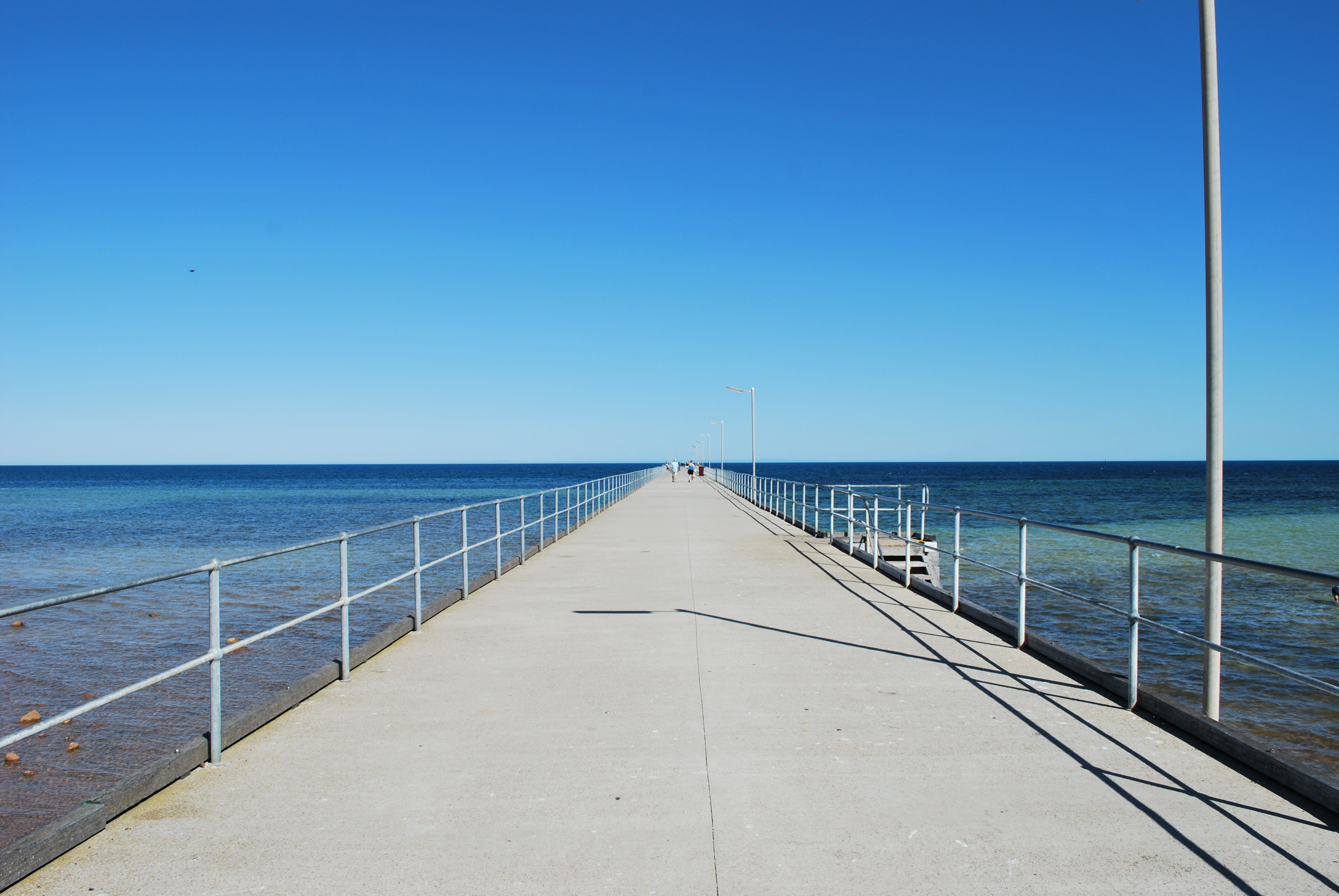
Ardrossan Jetty

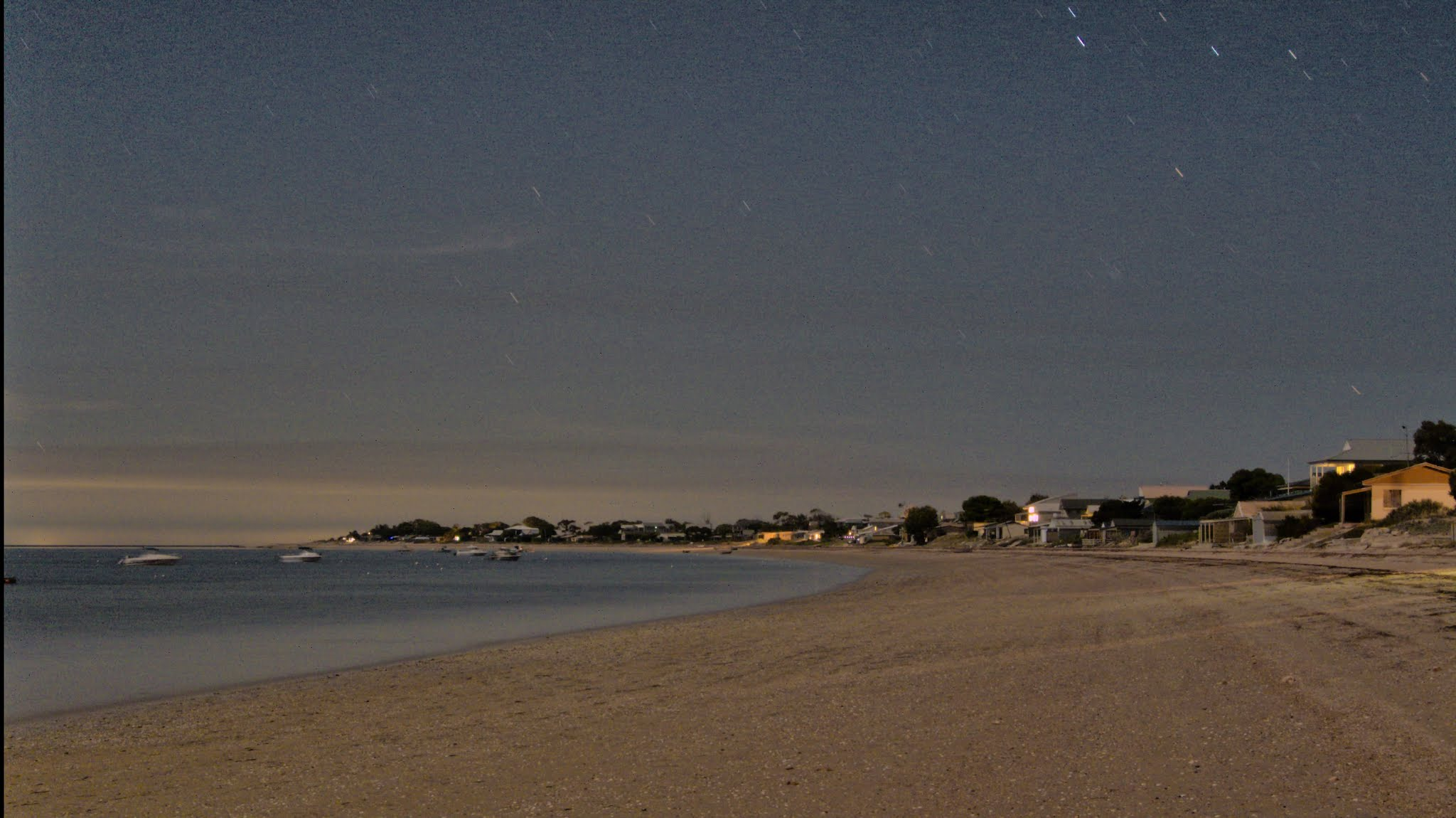
Black Point beach at dusk

== See also ==
=== Copper Coast ===
Since the discovery of Copper on Yorke Peninsula over 150 years ago, the towns of Kadina, Moonta and Wallaroo have been collectively known as the Copper Coast.

=== Kernewek Lowender ===
The world's largest Cornish Festival takes place every 2 years (in odd-numbered years) in the Copper Coast towns of Kadina, Moonta and Wallaroo.
