= Pterostylis ferruginea =

Bangham rustyhood

Scientific classification
- Kingdom: Plantae
- Clade: Tracheophytes
- Clade: Angiosperms
- Clade: Monocots
- Order: Asparagales
- Family: Orchidaceae
- Subfamily: Orchidoideae
- Tribe: Cranichideae
- Genus: Pterostylis
- Species: P. ferruginea

Binomial name
- Pterostylis ferruginea (D.L.Jones) G.N.Backh.

Synonyms
- Oligochaetochilus ferrugineus D.L.Jones

Species of orchid

Pterostylis ferruginea, commonly known as the Bangham rustyhood, is a plant in the orchid family Orchidaceae and is endemic to the border area between South Australia and Victoria. It has a rosette of leaves and when flowering, up to ten upright, dark green and translucent white flowers which have an insect-like labellum.

== Description ==
Pterostylis ferruginea, is a terrestrial, perennial, deciduous, herb with an underground tuber. It has a rosette of between six and ten egg-shaped leaves 15–60 mm (0.6–2 in) long and 6–20 mm (0.2–0.8 in) wide. Flowering plants have a rosette at the base of the flowering spike but the leaves are usually withered by flowering time. Between two and ten dark green flowers with translucent white panels and 10–14 mm (0.4–0.6 in) long are borne on a flowering stem up to 400 mm (20 in) tall. The flowers are erect and there are between three and eight stem leaves wrapped around the flowering stem. The dorsal sepal and petals form a hood or "galea" over the column with the dorsal sepal having an upturned, thread-like tip 1–2 mm (0.04–0.08 in) long. The lateral sepals turn downwards with their outer edges rolled inwards, and have tapered tips. The labellum is fleshy, insect-like, about 4 mm (0.2 in) long and 2 mm (0.08 in) wide and has a thickened "head" end with short hairs and four to eight longer hairs on each side of the "body". Flowering occurs from September to November.

== Taxonomy and naming ==
This rustyhood orchid was first formally described in 2009 by David Jones who gave it the name Oligochaetochilus ferrugineus. The description was published in The Orchadian from a specimen collected in the Padthaway Conservation Park. In 2010 Gary Backhouse changed the name to Pterostylis ferruginea. The specific epithet (ferruginea) is a Latin word meaning "rusty" or "rust-coloured".

== Distribution and habitat ==
The Bangham rustyhood is only known from the Wimmera area of western Victoria and the far south-east of South Australia where it grows in heathy forest and woodland.
