= Padthaway =

Padthaway may refer to the following:

- Padthaway, South Australia, a town and a locality
- Padthaway Conservation Park, a protected area in South Australia
- Padthaway Estate, a heritage-listed building in Padthaway, South Australia
- Padthaway Football Club, an AFL football team in the Kowree-Naracoorte-Tatiara Football League
- Pathaway tribe, an alternative name for the Australian indigenous people, the Potaruwutj
- Padthaway wine region, a wine region in South Australia
