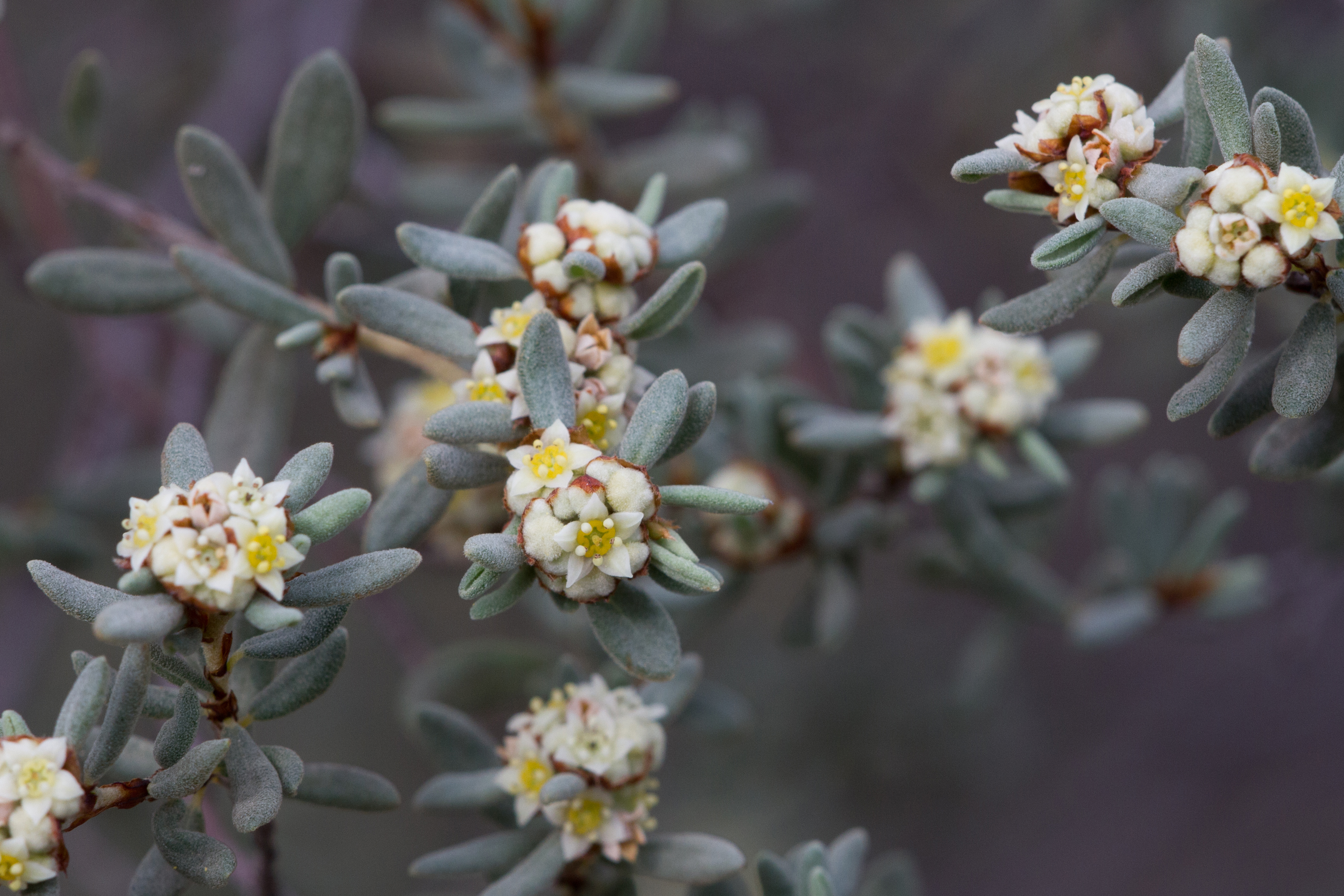
- In the Ferries McDonald Conservation Park

Scientific classification
- Kingdom: Plantae
- Clade: Tracheophytes
- Clade: Angiosperms
- Clade: Eudicots
- Clade: Rosids
- Order: Rosales
- Family: Rhamnaceae
- Genus: Spyridium
- Species: S. subochreatum

Binomial name
- Spyridium subochreatum (F.Muell.) Reissek

Synonyms
- Cryptandra subochreata (F.Muell.) F.Muell.; Pomaderris subochreata Reissek nom. inval., pro syn.; Spyridium subochreatum var. laxiusculum J.M.Black; Spyridium subochreatum (F.Muell.) Reissek var. subochreatum; Trymalium behrii F.Muell. ex Reissek; Trymalium subochreatum F.Muell.

= Spyridium subochreatum =

Species of shrub

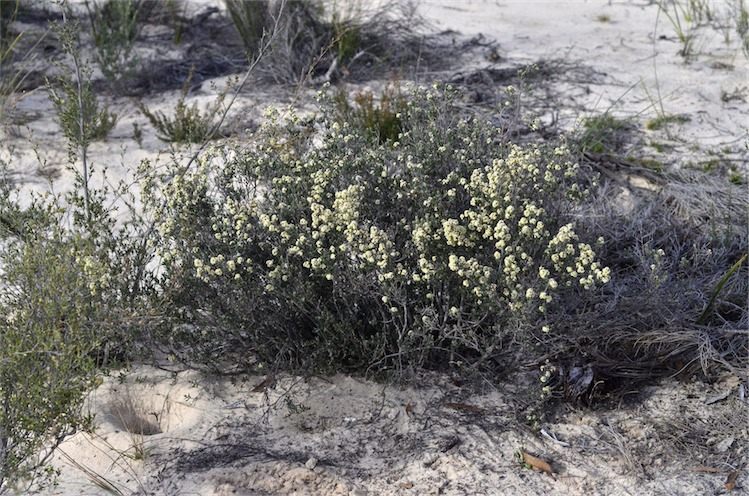
Habit in the Big Desert Wilderness Park

Spyridium subochreatum is a species of flowering plant in the family Rhamnaceae and is endemic to southern continental Australia. It is a low shrub with linear to oblong or narrowly egg-shaped leaves, and dense clusters of creamy-white flowers with dark brown, papery bracts at the base.

== Description ==
Spyridium subochreatum is a straggly or erect shrub that typically grows to a height of up to 60 cm (24 in), its branchlets densely covered with woolly hairs. The leaves are linear to oblong or narrowly egg-shaped, mainly 5–15 mm (0.20–0.59 in) long and 1–4 mm (0.039–0.157 in) wide with brown stipules 2–7 mm (0.079–0.276 in) long at the base. The edges of the leaves are sometimes rolled under, concealing the densely softly-hairy lower surface. The flowers are arranged in dense heads near the ends of branches surrounded at the base by several dark brown, papery bracts. The flowers are creamy-white and 2–3 mm (0.079–0.118 in) long. Flowering occurs from August to November and the fruit is an oval capsule about 2.5 mm (0.098 in) long.

== Taxonomy ==
This species was first formally described in 1855 by Ferdinand von Mueller who gave it the name Trymalium subochreatum in his book Definitions of rare or hitherto undescribed Australian plants. In 1858, Siegfried Reissek changed the name to Spyridium subochreatum in the journal Linnaea. The specific epithet (subochreatum) means "almost protected by greaves or leggings".

== Distribution and habitat ==
Spyridium subochreatum grows in mallee-heath on sand dunes and is widespread and common in north-western Victoria and south-eastern South Australia. It also occurs in the Esperance Plains and Mallee bioregions of southern Western Australia.
