= Cape Torrens Wilderness Protection Area =

Protected area in South Australia

- IUCN category Ib (wilderness area)
- Location within South Australia
- Location: South Australia
- Nearest city: Parndana
- Coordinates: 35°43′30″S 136°45′00″E
- Area: 9.4 km^{2} (3.6 sq mi)
- Established: 21 January 1971
- Governing body: Department for Environment and Water

Cape Torrens Wilderness Protection Area, formerly the Cape Torrens Conservation Park and the Cape Torrens National Park, is a protected area on Kangaroo Island, South Australia. It was originally dedicated on 21 January 1971 to conserve remnant native vegetation with outstanding coastal and cliff scenery and proclaimed as a wilderness protection area on 15 October 1993.

== Description ==
The wilderness protection area has an area of 9.4 square kilometres (3.6 sq mi) with 7 km (4.3 mi) of coastline including Cape Torrens. It lies towards the western end of the island's north coast. It is characterised by a coastal ridge and the scenic cliffs typical of the north coast, declining in altitude further inland. The cliff tops carry a coastal complex dominated by Acacia paradoxa, grading inland to open eucalypt scrubland. The ridge has patches of Eucalyptus cladocalyx woodland with an understorey of Hakea rostrata, Xanthorrhoea tateana and Lasiopetalum sp. The wilderness protection area is classified as an IUCN Category Ib protected area.

== Wilderness qualities ==
The following qualities have been identified by the government agency managing the wilderness protection area:

The area is outstanding for the biological integrity of its native forest and woodland, and for its wild coastal scenery. It also contains habitat for the endangered Glossy Black-cockatoo. The wilderness quality of Cape Torrens Wilderness Protection Area is recorded as high, as it is undisturbed by structures and impacts of modern technology. There are no internal tracks and the vegetation is virtually pristine.
