= The Knoll Conservation Park =

Protected area in South Australia

- IUCN category III (natural monument or feature)
- Location within South Australia
- Location: South Australia
- Nearest city: Stirling
- Coordinates: 35°00′26″S 138°41′58″E
- Area: 2 ha (4.9 acres)
- Established: 1 January 1917
- Governing body: Department for Environment and Water

The Knoll Conservation Park (formerly The Knoll National Park Reserve and The Knoll National Pleasure Resort) is a protected area located in the Australian state of South Australia in the suburb of Crafers West in the Adelaide Hills state government region about 12 kilometres (7.5 mi) south-east of the state capital of Adelaide and about 1.5 kilometres (0.93 mi) west of the town centre in Stirling.

The conservation park consists of land in section 612 in the cadastral unit of the Hundred of Adelaide and which is bounded to the west by the Waverley Ridge Road.

The conservation park began by 1917 as a national pleasure resort. On 9 November 1967, it was proclaimed under the National Parks Act 1966 as The Knoll National Parks Reserve. On 27 April 1972, it was reconstituted as The Knoll Conservation Park upon the proclamation of the National Parks and Wildlife Act 1972. As of 2016, it covered an area of 2 hectares (4.9 acres).

In 1980, it was described as follows:

The Knoll Conservation Park lies 13km south-east of Adelaide and is the smallest conservation park on the South Australian mainland. The Knoll is a small crest, 566m above sea level with steep south and east-facing slopes and a relatively flat north-western area. The park is covered by eucalyptus obliqua open forest with an understorey dominated by native plants in the southern and eastern sections, while introduced shrubs such as Ulex europaeus (gorse) are common in the north and west. The northern and western edges of the park support a large number and variety of introduced plant species. Past efforts made to control Ulex europaeus have failed and this species remains as one of the serious pest plants in the park.

The conservation park is classified as an IUCN Category III protected area. In 1980, it was nominated for inclusion on the interim list of the now-defunct Register of the National Estate, but was withdrawn by the nominator because of its “small size”, “ drastically altered natural vegetation” and the “reserve used primarily for community recreation with little or no conservation significance”.

== See also ==
- Protected areas of South Australia
