= Ramsay Conservation Park =

Protected area in South Australia

- IUCN category VI (protected area with sustainable use of natural resources)
- Location within South Australia
- Location: South Australia
- Nearest city: Port Vincent
- Coordinates: 34°45′42″S 137°47′39″E/
- Area: 1.45 km^{2} (0.56 sq mi)
- Established: 14 February 2008
- Governing body: Department for Environment and Water

Ramsay Conservation Park is a protected area in the Australian state of South Australia located in the Yorke Peninsula in the locality of Ramsay about 6.5 kilometres (4.0 miles) west-northwest of the town of Port Vincent.

The conservation park consists of crown land in "Allotment 10 of Deposited Plan 72948" of the cadastral unit of the Hundred of Ramsay. It came into existence on 14 February 2008 by proclamation under the National Parks and Wildlife Act 1972. On the same day, a separate proclamation ensured that “certain existing and future rights of entry, prospecting, exploration or mining” permitted under the state's Mining Act 1971 and Petroleum and Geothermal Energy Act 2000 would apply to the extent of the conservation park. As of 2018, it covered an area of 1.45 square kilometres (0.56 sq mi).

The following statement of significance appears in its management plan:

Ramsay Conservation Park (147.2 hectares; proclaimed in 2008) is a small park in the Minlaton-Curramulka Threatened Habitat Area. Its dominant vegetation is sheoak and mallee, with very low woodlands and a grassy understorey. It occurs in a high priority bioregion and conserves some species of conservation significance, including the nationally and state endangered Jumping-jack Wattle (Acacia enterocarpa), which has not been recorded thus far in any other National Parks and Wildlife Act reserves on Yorke Peninsula.

The conservation park is classified as an IUCN Category VI protected area.
