= Ettrick Conservation Park =

Protected area in South Australia

- IUCN category VI (protected area with sustainable use of natural resources)
- Location within South Australia
- Location: South Australia
- Nearest city: Murray Bridge
- Coordinates: 34°58′28″S 139°29′01″E
- Area: 4.79 km^{2} (1.85 sq mi)
- Established: 31 October 2013
- Governing body: Department for Environment and Water

Ettrick Conservation Park is a protected area located in the Australian state of South Australia in the locality of Ettrick about 80 kilometres (50 mi) east of the state capital of Adelaide and about 24 kilometres (15 mi) north-east of the city of Murray Bridge.

The conservation park consists of crown land described as “Allotment 99 in Deposited Plan 26809” in the cadastral unit of the Hundred of Ettrick. It came into existence on 31 October 2013 by proclamation under the National Parks and Wildlife Act 1972. It is named after the Hundred of Ettrick. A separate proclamation on 31 October 2013 ensured the continuation of “existing rights of entry, prospecting, exploration or mining” regarding the land under the Mining Act 1971 and the Petroleum and Geothermal Energy Act 2000. As of 2016, it covered an area of 4.79 square kilometres (1.85 sq mi).

In 2013, it was described by Ian Hunter, then Minister of Sustainability, Environment and Conservation to The Murray Valley Standard as follows:

… the park would be an important refuge for species such as malleefowl and regent parrot. "Most of the park is open mallee, which is made up of several species of eucalypt, but it is also home to one of the few remaining examples of tussock grassland in this part of the Murray-Darling Basin", … "This area is listed as critically endangered, so it's vital we do everything we can to protect it." It is also home to birds including the shy heathwren, hooded robin, white-winged chough, jacky winter, restless flycatcher and painted buttonquail.

The conservation park is classified as an IUCN Category VI protected area.

== See also ==
- Protected areas of South Australia
