= Coobowie Aquatic Reserve =

Protected area in South Australia

- IUCN category VI (protected area with sustainable use of natural resources)
- Location within South Australia
- Location: South Australia
- Nearest city: Coobowie.
- Coordinates: 35.0485°S 137.7341°E
- Area: 2.78 km^{2} (1.07 sq mi)
- Governing body: Primary Industries and Regions SA (PIRSA)

Coobowie Aquatic Reserve is a marine protected area in the Australian state of South Australia located in the waters of Gulf St Vincent adjoining the east coast of Yorke Peninsula. It is located partly within the locality of Coobowie and partly within a bay called Salt Creek Bay within the gulf.

It was declared for the "protection of important fish nursery habitats". The aquatic reserve consists of two areas: Area 1 which is the area of Salt Creek Bay north of a line from Giles Points to a causeway on the west side of the Bay, and Area 2 - a small estuary known as Salt Swamp Creek located to the west side of both Salt Creek Bay and the causeway. In Area 1, the following activities are permitted - fishing from boat or shore using rod and line or handline, collecting bait from the beach, boating, diving and swimming. In Area 2, the following activities are prohibited - fishing or the collection or removal of any marine organisms.

Since 2012, it has been located within the boundaries of the Lower Yorke Peninsula Marine Park with Area 1 being within a "general managed use zone" and Area 2 being within a "sanctuary zone".

The aquatic reserve is classified as an IUCN Category VI protected area.

== See also ==
- Protected areas of South Australia
