= Hale Conservation Park =

Protected area in South Australia

- IUCN category III (natural monument or feature)
- Location within South Australia
- Location: South Australia
- Nearest city: Williamstown
- Coordinates: 34°41′17″S 138°54′28″E
- Area: 1.89 km^{2} (0.73 sq mi)
- Established: 9 January 1964
- Governing body: Department for Environment and Water
- Website: Official website

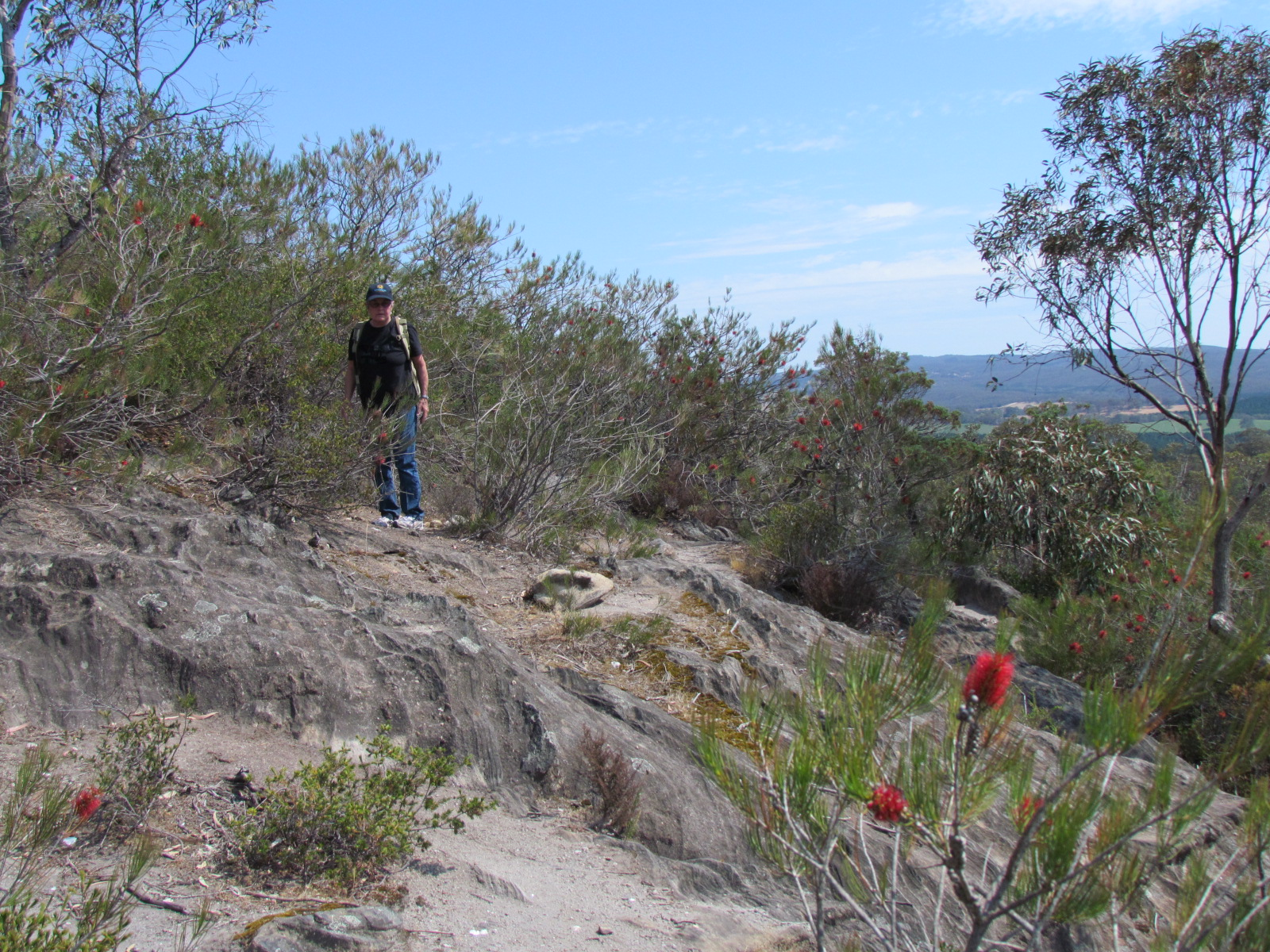
Small quarry, Hale CP

Hale Conservation Park (formerly Hale National Park and Hale Wild-Life Reserve) is a protected area in the Australian state of South Australia located in the locality of Williamstown about 60 kilometres (37 miles) north-east of the state capital of Adelaide and about 2 kilometres (1.2 miles) south-east of the town centre in Williamstown.

The conservation park consists of land in sections 119, 124, 125, 135, 138 and 315 in the cadastral unit of the Hundred of Barossa.

Land consisting of sections 119, 124, 125, 135 and 138 first gained protected status as a wildlife reserve proclaimed on 9 January 1964 under the Crown Lands Act 1929. On 4 February 1965, all of the land previously proclaimed as a wildlife reserve in 1964 and section 315 were proclaimed as the Hale Wild-Life Reserve under the Crown Lands Act 1929. On 9 November 1967, all of the land was proclaimed under the National Parks Act 1966 as the Hale National Park. The national park was re-proclaimed under the National Parks and Wildlife Act 1972 as the Hale Conservation Park on 27 April 1972. As of 2018, it covered an area of 1.89 square kilometres (0.73 sq mi).

In 1980, the conservation park was described as follows:

Hale Conservation Park is situated in rugged hilly country of the north-central Mount Lofty Ranges. The dominant plant community is a low open forest of Eucalyptus obliqua, E. goniocalyx and E. fasciculosa, above a mid-dense heath understorey. Common mammals in the park are Macropus fuliginosus (western grey kangaroo) and Tachyglossus aculeatus (echidna), while over sixty species of birds have been recorded. A walking track traverses the length of the park... The Zoothera dauma (scaly thrush) which is a threatened bird in South Australia due to destruction of its habitat ... can be found in the park. Together with Warren Conservation Park to the South, the park contains unique geological exposures of a recently discovered unconformity between the Adelaidian sequence and a rejuvenated crystalline basement inlier.

The conservation park is classified as an IUCN Category III protected area. In 1980, it was listed on the former Register of the National Estate.

== See also ==
- Protected areas of South Australia
