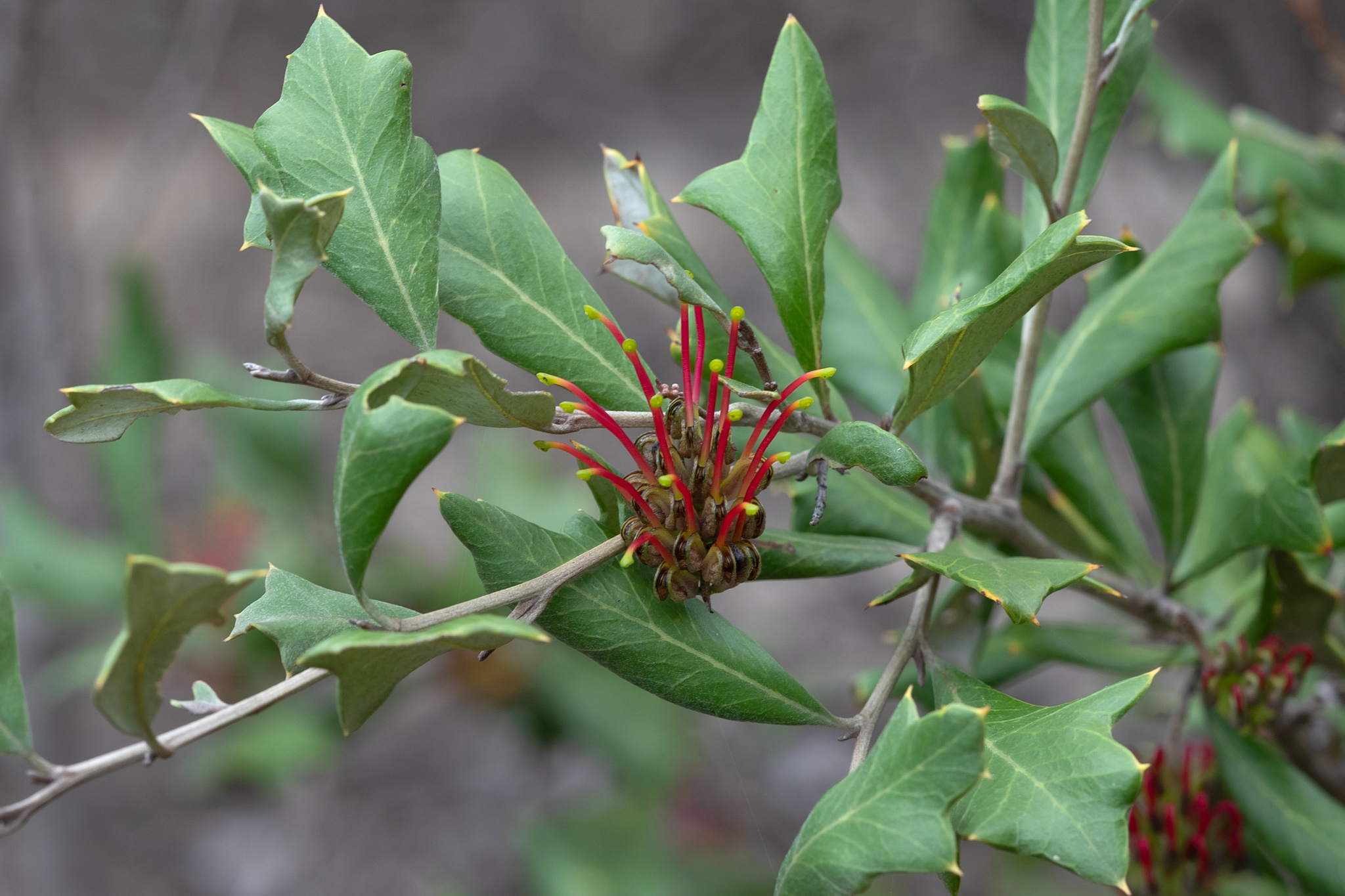
- In Monarto Woodlands Conservation Park

Conservation status
- Vulnerable (IUCN 3.1)

Scientific classification
- Kingdom: Plantae
- Clade: Embryophytes
- Clade: Tracheophytes
- Clade: Angiosperms
- Clade: Eudicots
- Order: Proteales
- Family: Proteaceae
- Genus: Grevillea
- Species: G. ilicifolia

Binomial name
- Grevillea ilicifolia (R.Br.) R.Br.

Subspecies
- (R.Br.) R.Br. subsp. ilicifolia; subsp. lobata (F.Muell.) Downing

Synonyms
- Anadenia ilicifolia R.Br.

= Grevillea ilicifolia =

Species of shrub endemic to Australia

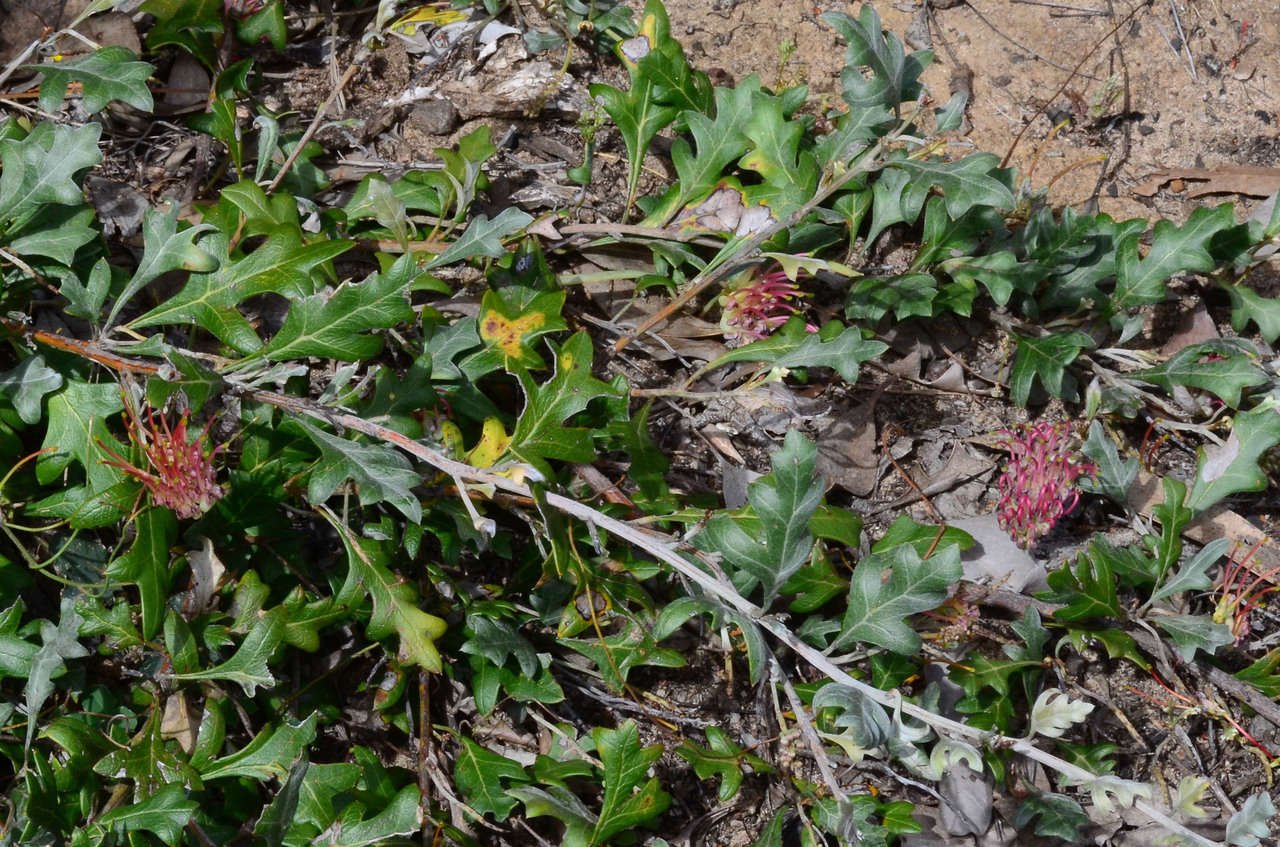
Habit near Serviceton

Grevillea ilicifolia, commonly known as holly grevillea or holly bush, is a species of flowering plant in the family Proteaceae and is endemic to southern continental Australia. It is a spreading to prostrate shrub with holly-like leaves with sharply-pointed triangular to egg-shaped teeth or lobes, and clusters of green to cream-coloured and mauve flowers with a pink to red style.

== Description ==
Grevillea ilicifolia is an erect to spreading or prostrate shrub typically 0.3–2 m (1 ft 0 in – 6 ft 7 in) high and 3 m (9.8 ft) wide. Its leaves are variably-shaped, typically egg-shaped in outline, 18–101 mm (0.71–3.98 in) long and 3–80 mm (0.12–3.15 in) wide with two to thirteen lobes each with sharply-pointed triangular to egg-shaped lobes or teeth 7–50 mm (0.28–1.97 in) long and 0.8–8 mm (0.031–0.315 in) wide. The flowers are usually arranged in clusters on a rachis 20–50 mm (0.79–1.97 in) long and are green to cream-coloured and mauve to grey, the pistil is 19.5–25 mm (0.77–0.98 in) long. The style is pink to red, sometimes orange to pale yellow, and green-tipped. Flowering occurs from September to November and the fruit is a hairy follicle 10.5–16.5 mm (0.41–0.65 in) long.

== Taxonomy ==
This species was first formally described in 1810 by Scottish botanist Robert Brown who gave it the name Anadenia ilicifolia in the Transactions of the Linnean Society of London. In 1830, Brown changed the name to Grevillea ilicifolia in his Supplementum primum prodromi florae Novae Hollandiae. The specific epithet (ilicifolia) means "holly-leaved".

In 2004, Trisha L. Downing described two subspecies of G. ilicifolia in Australian Systematic Botany and the names are accepted by the Australian Plant Census:

- Grevillea ilicifolia (R.Br.) R.Br. subsp. ilicifolia has wedge-shaped to kite-shaped leaves 17–50 mm (0.67–1.97 in) long and 8–35 mm (0.31–1.38 in) wide, usually with three to five primary lobes 8–18 mm (0.31–0.71 in) long and 6–12 mm (0.24–0.47 in) wide;
- Grevilla ilicifolia subsp. lobata (F.Muell.) Downing has herringbone or oak-shaped leaves 29–101 mm (1.1–4.0 in) long and 16–80 mm (0.63–3.15 in) wide, usually with four to eight primary lobes 7–33 mm (0.28–1.30 in) long and 3–18 mm (0.12–0.71 in) wide.

== Distribution and habitat ==
Grevillea ilicifolia grows in mallee, heath or shrubland in south-eastern South Australia, including the Eyre Peninsula and Kangaroo Island, in western inland Victoria, and near Griffith in western New South Wales. Subspecies lobata is restricted to north-western Victoria and the Murray and South-eastern botanical districts of South Australia.

== Conservation status ==
Grevillea ilicifolia is listed as Vulnerable on the IUCN Red List of Threatened Species, due to a past reduction in population due to land clearing for agriculture covering 30% of the population over 3 generations. This decline is projected to continue into the future due to increased fire frequencies. It is rare in New South Wales, where subspecies ilicifolia is listed as Critically Endangered under the Biodiversity Conservation Act 2016. It is believed to have gone regionally extinct in the Griffith area.

The main threats to the species in are land clearing for agriculture, inappropriate fire regimes and browsing by herbivores. The species may be susceptible to dieback disease from the pathogen Phytophthora cinnamomi. Some small subpopulations, particularly those in New South Wales, are vulnerable to stochastic events.
