= Rocky Island (North) Conservation Park =

Protected area in South Australia

- IUCN category Ia (strict nature reserve)
- Location within South Australia
- Location: South Australia
- Nearest city: Coffin Bay.
- Coordinates: 34°15′30″S 135°15′35″E
- Area: 17 ha (42 acres)
- Established: 16 March 1967
- Governing body: Department for Environment and Water

Rocky Island (North) Conservation Park is a protected area in the Australian state of South Australia associated with North Rocky Island which is located off the west coast of Eyre Peninsula in South Australia about 43 kilometres (27 miles) north northwest of Coffin Bay. The conservation park which had been declared as Fauna Conservation Reserve in March 1967, was re-proclaimed in 1972 under the National Parks and Wildlife Act 1972 to "conserve seal haulout areas and associated island habitat". The conservation park is classified as an International Union for Conservation of Nature (IUCN) Category Ia protected area.
