= Warren Conservation Park =

Protected area in South Australia

- IUCN category III (natural monument or feature)
- Location within South Australia
- Location: South Australia
- Nearest city: Williamstown
- Coordinates: 34°43′19″S 138°54′30″E
- Area: 3.64 km^{2} (1.41 sq mi)
- Established: 14 July 1966
- Governing body: Department for Environment and Water
- Website: Official website

Warren Conservation Park (formerly Warren National Park) is a protected area in the Australian state of South Australia located in the Adelaide Hills about 36 kilometres (22 mi) north-east of the state capital of Adelaide and about 10 kilometres (6.2 mi) south-east of Williamstown.

The conservation park consists of land in sections 118, 387 and 388 in the cadastral unit of the Hundred of Para Wirra and section 321 in the Hundred of Barossa. Land in sections 118, 387 and 388 first gained protected area status as a wildlife reserve proclaimed under the Crown Lands Act 1929 on 14 July 1966. On 9 November 1967, the land in the wildlife reserve was proclaimed under the National Parks Act 1966 as the Warren National Park. On 27 November 1969, section 321 was added to the national park. On 27 April 1972, the national park was reconstituted as the Warren Conservation Park upon the proclamation of the National Parks and Wildlife Act 1972. As of 2018, it covered an area of 3.64 square kilometres (1.41 sq mi).

In 1980, it was described as follows:

Warren Conservation Park is situated in rugged hilly country and receives over 750mm of rain annually. The dominant plant community is an open forest of Eucalyptus obliqua and E. goniocalyx, which has a heath understorey. Eucalyptus fasciculosa, E. huberana and E. leucoxylon are scattered throughout. Macropus fuliginosus (western grey kangaroo) is common in the park, while a walking trail traverses the length of the park. The Zoothera dauma (scaly thrush), which is a threatened bird due to destruction of its habitat ... , occurs in the park. Together with Hale Conservation Park to the north, Warren Conservation Park contains unique geological exposures of a recently discovered unconformity between the Adelaidian sequence and a rejuvenated crystalline basement inlier.

The conservation park is classified as an IUCN Category III protected area. In 1980, it was listed on the now-defunct Register of the National Estate.

== See also ==
- Protected areas of South Australia
