= Kungari Conservation Park =

Protected area in South Australia

- IUCN category VI (protected area with sustainable use of natural resources)
- Location within South Australia
- Location: South Australia
- Nearest city: Robe
- Coordinates: 37°01′14″S 139°59′15″E
- Area: 5.64 km^{2} (2.18 sq mi)
- Established: 10 March 2011
- Governing body: Department for Environment and Water

Kungari Conservation Park is a protected area located in the Australian state of South Australia in the locality of Reedy Creek about 260 kilometres (160 mi) south-east of the state capital of Adelaide and about 26 kilometres (16 mi) north-east of the town of Robe.

The conservation park consists of land in section 171 of the cadastral unit of the Hundred of Bowaka, which is an area bounded by an unsealed road, Woolmit Road, in the north and bounded by the locality's boundary with Mount Benson in the south and includes part of a wetland known as Rushy Swamp.

It was proclaimed on 10 March 2011 as a conservation park under the National Parks and Wildlife Act 1972 to provide "a protected habitat for the many nesting bird(s) including the black swan and migratory birds from China and Japan". A complementary proclamation on 10 March 2011 ensured the continuation of “existing rights of entry, prospecting, exploration or mining” regarding the land under the Petroleum and Geothermal Energy Act 2000. Permission to use the Aboriginal word Kungari ('black swan') for the name of the conservation park was given by local Aboriginal people in August 2010. As of 2016, it covered an area of 564 hectares (1,390 acres).

The conservation park is classified as an IUCN Category VI protected area.

== See also ==
- Protected areas of South Australia
