= Rocky Island (South) Conservation Park =

Protected area in South Australia

- IUCN category Ia (strict nature reserve)
- Location within South Australia
- Location: South Australia
- Nearest city: Coffin Bay.
- Coordinates: 34°48′37″S 134°43′1″E
- Area: 22 ha (54 acres)
- Established: 16 March 1967
- Governing body: Department for Environment and Water

Rocky Island (South) Conservation Park is a protected area in the Australian state of South Australia associated with Rocky Island which is located off the west coast of Eyre Peninsula about 72 kilometres (45 miles) west-southwest of Coffin Bay. The conservation park was proclaimed in 1972 under the National Parks and Wildlife Act 1972 to ‘conserve New Zealand fur seal breeding areas and associated island habitat’. The conservation park is classified as an IUCN Category Ia protected area.
