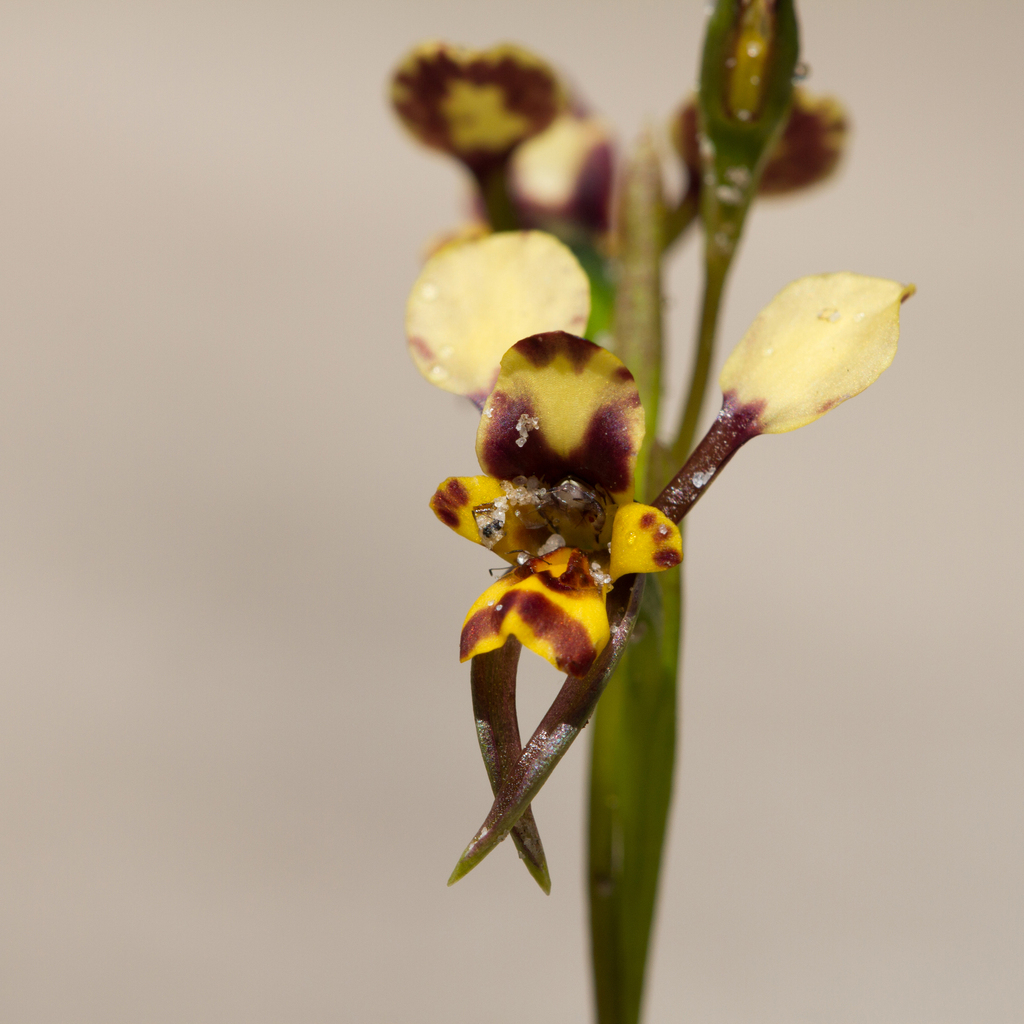
- Near Monarto South

Scientific classification
- Kingdom: Plantae
- Clade: Embryophytes
- Clade: Tracheophytes
- Clade: Angiosperms
- Clade: Monocots
- Order: Asparagales
- Family: Orchidaceae
- Subfamily: Orchidoideae
- Tribe: Diurideae
- Genus: Diuris
- Species: D. calcicola

Binomial name
- Diuris calcicola R.J.Bates

= Diuris calcicola =

Species of orchid

Diuris brevifolia is a species of orchid that is endemic to South Australia. It usually has one or two grass-like leaves and a flowering stem with up to five bright yellow and reddish-brown flowers with purple stalks.

== Description ==
Diuris calcicola is a tuberous, terrestrial herb usually with one or two grass-like leaves 100–200 mm (3.9–7.9 in) long and 3–5 mm (0.1–0.2 in) wide, often with a purplish base. Up to five bright yellow flowers with purple stalks and 10–15 mm (0.39–0.59 in) wide are borne on a flowering stem 100–200 mm (3.9–7.9 in) tall. The dorsal sepal is egg-shaped, glossy yellow with two brown blotches, 10–12 mm (0.39–0.47 in) long, 8–10 mm (0.31–0.39 in) wide, the lateral sepals green or purplish and linear, 5–8 mm (0.20–0.31 in) long, about 2 mm (0.079 in) wide and pendent. The petals are erect and glossy yellow on slender purplish stalks, 6–12 mm (0.24–0.47 in) long and about 8 mm (0.31 in) wide. The labellum is yellow and brown with three lobes, the middle lobe spatula-shaped, 5–6 mm (0.20–0.24 in) long and 2–3 mm (0.079–0.118 in) wide with side lobes about 7 mm (0.28 in) long, 5 mm (0.20 in) wide and yellow with a few irregular reddish-brown markings.

== Taxonomy and naming ==
Diuris calcicola was first formally described in 2015 by Robert John Bates in Australian Orchid Review from specimens he collected 50 km (31 mi) east of Kingston in 2013. The specific epithet (calcicola) means "limestone favouring", referring to the preferred habitat of this species.

== Distribution and habitat ==
This donkey orchid usually grows on limestone plains and rises, in mallee woodland or shrubland, sometimes in grassy woodland mostly to the east of the Murray River in south-eastern South Australia.
