= Fairview Conservation Park =

Protected area in South Australia

- IUCN category Ia (strict nature reserve)
- Location within South Australia
- Location: South Australia, Woolumbool
- Nearest city: Lucindale
- Coordinates: 36°50′03″S 140°25′03″E
- Area: 13.94 km^{2} (5.38 sq mi)
- Established: 13 October 1960
- Visitors: 'not high' (in 1994)
- Governing body: Department for Environment and Water

Fairview Conservation Park (formerly the Fairview National Park) is a protected area in the Australian state of South Australia located in the gazetted locality of Woolumbool about 17 kilometres (11 mi) north of Lucindale in the state's Limestone Coast region.

The conservation park is located on land in sections 93, 98 and 61 in the cadastral unit of the Hundred of Woolumbool on the east side of Woolumbool Road. Sections 93 and 98 were constituted under the Crown Lands Act 1929 on 13 October 1960 as a wild life reserve. On 9 November 1967, sections 93 and 98 were proclaimed under the National Parks Act 1966 as Fairview National Park. In 1972, it was constituted as a conservation park upon the proclamation of the National Parks and Wildlife Act 1972 on 27 April 1972. In 1984, additional land consisting of section 61 in the Hundred of Woolumbool located immediately south of the original proclamation was added to the conservation park. As of July 2016, the conservation park covered an area of 13.94 square kilometres (5.38 sq mi).

As of 1994, the conservation park was described as follows:

… two semi-permanent lagoons, extensive areas of seasonally inundated flats, sandy flats and ridges, and limestone ridges. A South Australian swamp paper-bark (Melaleuca halmaturorum) association, with sedges and sandy beaches characterises the lagoon edges. Open heath and tussock grasslands cover the seasonally inundated flats, while a low open woodland of South Australian blue gum (Eucalyptus leucoxylon) and rough-barked manna gum (E. viminalis subsp. cygnetensis) occupies the sandy flats and limestone ridges.

As of 1994, visitor use was reported as being “not high” and consisted of “irregular use” of a picnic area by “the Naracoorte and Lucindale communities” and “bushwalking for field nature study”.

The conservation park is classified as an IUCN Category Ia protected area.
