= Mantung Conservation Park =

Protected area in South Australia

- IUCN category VI (protected area with sustainable use of natural resources)
- Location within South Australia
- Location: South Australia, Mantung
- Nearest city: Loxton
- Coordinates: 34°35′29″S 140°07′31″E
- Area: 16.96 km^{2} (6.55 sq mi)
- Established: 16 October 2014
- Governing body: Department for Environment and Water

Mantung Conservation Park is a protected area located in the Australian state of South Australia in the locality of Mantung about 45 kilometres (28 miles) west of the town of Loxton.

The conservation park was proclaimed under the National Parks and Wildlife Act 1972 on 16 October 2014 in respect to land in Sections 27 and 40 of the cadastral unit of the Hundred of Mantung.

The conservation park was reported as being important for the conservation of the following bird species - malleefowl, southern scrub robin, shy heathwren, inland thornbill, white-browed babbler and purple-gaped honeyeater.

It is classified as an IUCN Category VI protected area.
