= Furner Conservation Park =

Protected area in South Australia

- IUCN category III (natural monument or feature)
- Location within South Australia
- Location: South Australia
- Nearest city: Millicent
- Coordinates: 37°22′26″S 140°15′53″E
- Area: 289 ha (710 acres)
- Established: 22 November 1973
- Governing body: Department for Environment and Water

Furner Conservation Park is a protected area located in the Australian state of South Australia in the locality of Furner about 310 kilometres (190 mi) south-east of the state capital of Adelaide and about 27 kilometres (17 mi) north west of the municipal seat of Millicent.

The conservation park occupies land in section 245 of the cadastral unit of the Hundred of Kennion. It was constituted as a conservation park under the National Parks and Wildlife Act 1972 on 22 November 1973. As of 2016, it covered an area of 289 hectares (710 acres).

In 1980, the conservation park's listing on the now-defunct Register of the National Estate argued it to be significant because it was a “relatively undisturbed remnant of open forest and woodland representing the vegetation associations of both consolidated dune and interdunal flat” and “features a picturesque understorey of some diversity which provides much needed habitat for a typical south-east South Australian forest fauna”.

In 1990, the conservation park was described as consisting of "a gently undulating sandy rise with bleached sands and a yellow-grey B horizon" with "secondary landforms are parallel stony rises with exposed calcarenite, and red, weakly-structured sandy soils and low-lying sandy flats". The vegetation cover was described as consisting of three main associations. The first was "an open woodland of messmate stringybark… on the sandy rise with a similar but denser formation on most of the sandy flats". The second was "a woodland of river red gum… and rough barked manna gum" with some "areas of swamp gum… on the flats mainly in the eastern part of the conservation park near the watercourse known as Reedy Creek". The third was "a pink gum… open woodland with isolated drooping sheoaks … on the stony rises".

In 1990, the conservation park was "mainly used by field naturalist" and it was considered to have "potential" for use as an educational resource by the Kangaroo Inn Area School located about 4 kilometres (2.5 mi) to the north-west in the locality of Kangaroo Inn.

The conservation park is classified as an IUCN Category III protected area.

== See also ==
- Protected areas of South Australia
