= Minlacowie Conservation Park =

Protected area in South Australia

- IUCN category VI (protected area with sustainable use of natural resources)
- Location within South Australia
- Location: South Australia
- Nearest city: Stansbury.
- Coordinates: 34°52′57″S 137°39′10″E
- Area: 28 ha (69 acres)
- Established: 14 February 2008
- Governing body: Department of Environment, Water and Natural Resources

Minlacowie Conservation Park is a protected area located in the Yorke Peninsula of South Australia about 13 kilometres (8.1 miles) west of Stansbury. The conservation park was proclaimed under the National Parks and Wildlife Act 1972 in 2008. The following statement of significance appears in the park's management plan:

Minlacowie Conservation Park (28.5 hectares; proclaimed in 2008) is located about 13 kilometres west of Stansbury. The park comprises a small patch of remnant mallee/broombush vegetation in very good condition, and conserves a number of significant plant species including the nationally and state vulnerable Winter Spider-orchid (Caladenia brumalis).

The conservation park is classified as an IUCN Category VI protected area.
