= White Dam Conservation Park =

Protected area in South Australia

- IUCN category Ia (strict nature reserve)
- Location within South Australia
- Location: South Australia
- Nearest city: Morgan
- Coordinates: 33°56′12″S 139°30′33″E
- Area: 8.91 km^{2} (3.44 sq mi)
- Established: 17 July 1969
- Visitors: "quite low" (in 1994)
- Governing body: Department for Environment and Water

White Dam Conservation Park (formerly the White's Dam Conservation Park and the White National Parks Reserve) is a protected area located in the Australian state of South Australia in the localities of Lindley and Maude about 139 kilometres (86 mi) north-east of the state capital of Adelaide and about 14 kilometres (8.7 mi) north-west of the town of Morgan.

The conservation park consists of land in the Sections 197, 199, 201 and 202 in the cadastral unit of the Hundred of Lindley and Section 252 of the Hundred of Maude. The conservation park consists of a strip of land along alternative sides of the Goyder Highway on its route form Morgan in the south-east to Burra in the north-west.

The land first received protected area status as the White National Parks Reserve in respect to land in section 202 of the Hundred of Lindley and was proclaimed on 17 July 1969 under the National Parks Act 1966. On 17 September 1970, the remainder of the current extent was added. On 27 April 1972, the national parks reserve was reconstituted as the White's Dam Conservation Park under the National Parks and Wildlife Act 1972. On 12 May 1983, its name was altered to White Dam Conservation Park. As of 2018, it covered an area of 8.91 square kilometres (3.44 sq mi).

In 1994, the conservation park was described as follows:

The black oak (Allocasuarina cristata) low open woodland has an understorey dominated by bluebush (Mareana sedifolia) . Other understorey species present include spear grass (Stipa sp.), emubush (Eremophila sp.), Electrion sp., false sandalwood (Myoporum platycarpum), quondong (Santalum acumintum), and nitrebush (Nitraria billardierei)...

As of 1994, visitation was described as being “quite low” despite the “significant numbers of people” using the Goyder Highway.

The conservation park is classified as an IUCN Category Ia protected area.

== See also ==
- Protected areas of South Australia
