= Monaro =

Monaro may refer to:

- Monaro (New South Wales), a region in the south of the Australian state
  - Division of Eden-Monaro, federal electorate
  - Electoral district of Monaro, state electorate
  - Snowy Monaro Regional Council
- Monaro Highway, the main state highway from Canberra to the Monaro region
- Holden Monaro, an automobile manufactured by Holden, the Australian branch of General Motors, taking its name from the region
  - Chevrolet Lumina Coupe, Middle East model
  - Pontiac GTO, American model
  - Vauxhall Monaro, UK model

== See also ==
- Monarto (disambiguation)
- Monari
