= Point Davenport Conservation Park =

Protected area in South Australia

- IUCN category III (natural monument or feature)
- Location within South Australia
- Location: South Australia
- Nearest city: Warooka
- Coordinates: 35°9′38″S 137°20′4″E
- Area: 2.47 km^{2} (0.95 sq mi)
- Established: 16 July 1987
- Governing body: Department for Environment and Water

Point Davenport Conservation Park is a protected area occupying Point Davenpoint, a headland between Foul Bay and Sturt Bay on the south coast of Yorke Peninsula in South Australia about 19.8 kilometres (12.3 miles) south of Warooka. The park was proclaimed in 1987. The conservation park is considered to be ‘an area of high biodiversity with a range of habitats including beaches and foredunes, and an estuary that is listed as a nationally important wetland.’ It is classified as an IUCN Category III protected area.
