= Ferries McDonald Conservation Park =

Protected area in South Australia

- IUCN category III (natural monument or feature)
- Location within South Australia
- Location: South Australia
- Nearest city: Murray Bridge
- Coordinates: 35.2343°S 139.1393°E
- Area: 8.42 km^{2} (3.25 sq mi)
- Established: 28 July 1938
- Governing body: Department for Environment and Water
- Website: Official website

Ferries McDonald Conservation Park is a protected area in the Australian state of South Australia located in the gazetted locality of Monarto South about 10 kilometres (6.2 mi) south-west of Murray Bridge. It covers an area of 845 hectares and provides a habitat for a range of native and endangered species. It is one of a number of protected patches of remnant mallee bushland within the region. Conservation organisations are now attempting to restore and connect these patches of the fragmented Murray plains in an attempt to heighten the prospects of various rare and endangered species.

Ferries McDonald Conservation Park is open to the public. Walking trails and bird watching opportunities are the main attractions for visitors.

== History ==
Much of the land surrounding the current park was cleared years ago for agriculture, but a few rocky outcrops, not suitable for farming practices, preserved fragments of the original vegetation.

Robert Sweet McDonald, a private landowner, donated a tract of such land as an example of mallee scrubland and its typical inhabitants. The original land was later added to.

== Ecology ==
Ferries McDonald Conservation Park is part of what once was a vast area of mallee bushland during pre-industrial times. Located on the Murray plains, a variety of native shrubs make up the majority of the ‘open scrub’ habitat that supports a range of native species including the Red, Western Grey and Euro Kangaroos, Emus and a variety of native bird populations. Bird species include the White-plumed honeyeater, Yellow Plumed Honeyeater, Fairy wrens, thornbills, robins, lorikeets, Galahs, Mallee Ringnecks and Red Wattlebirds. Smaller terrestrial species such as the Bilby and Bush Stone-curlew however are now missing due to extensive fox and feral cat predation. Among the variety of insect life are tenebrionid beetles, and the park is also home to Australasian ground spiders.

=== Malleefowl ===
A focus within the park has been the protection of the Malleefowl (Leipoa ocellata), a native bird species that originally inhabited much of the natural mallee environment. Malleefowl are easy prey for common predators such as foxes and feral cats and are now only found at a handful of sites across Australia, including Ferries McDonald (CP). Malleefowl are listed as vulnerable nationally but are critically endangered in the Northern Territory and Western Australia. Ferries McDonald Conservation Park is home to a small population of Malleefowl that is closely monitored by the National Malleefowl Recovery Team (NMRT) and the Department of Environment and Natural Resources (DENR). Biological surveys of the area reveal fluctuating records of sightings and mound activity from year to year. Combined efforts between the National Malleefowl Recovery Team (NMRT) and the Department of Environment and Natural Resources (DENR) track Malleefowl progress as well as protect and manage multiple aspects of the park. Practices include fire management, revegetation and feral control.

Zoos South Australia (SA) has previously been granted permission to collect Malleefowl eggs from Ferries McDonald Conservation Park with the intention to produce a breeding population of Malleefowl fit enough for release into areas of remnant mallee habitat within the region.

== Flora ==
In addition to native animal species, Ferries McDonald Conservation Park is home to a variety of rare and endangered plant species. Resin Wattle (Acacia rhetinocarpa) is a compact, resinous spreading shrub that grows up to 2 metres in height with bright yellow flowers. It is endemic to South Australia and is only found in a few locations across the state including three populations in Ferries McDonald CP.

== Fire Management ==
Areas of vast Mallee bushland are prone to wildfire. . The Department of Environment and Water, with the help of volunteer groups, carry out operations within Ferries McDonald Conservation Park and the surrounding region aimed at minimising the fuel load and subsequently the risk of a bushfire. Techniques include the manual removal of excess vegetation, firebreaks, prescribed burning and mulching.

== Invasive species ==
Like most parts of the Australian landscape, Ferries McDonald Conservation Park has populations of introduced species, including feral cats, foxes and rabbits. Ferries McDonald (CP) in not fenced to keep out these species. The Department of Environment and Water practices baiting programs that aim to eradicate pest species within the Murray Darling Basin.

== See also ==
- Protected areas of South Australia
- Monarto Conservation Park
