= Sinclair Island Conservation Park =

Protected area in South Australia

- IUCN category Ia (strict nature reserve)
- Location within South Australia
- Location: South Australia
- Nearest city: Penong
- Coordinates: 32°8′43″S 132°59′13″E
- Area: 2.5 ha (6.2 acres)
- Established: 16 March 1967
- Governing body: Department for Environment and Water

Sinclair Island Conservation Park is a protected area in the Australian state of South Australia associated with Sinclair Island which is located off the west coast of Eyre Peninsula about 24 kilometres (15 miles) south of Penong. The conservation park which was declared as Fauna Conservation Reserve in March 1967, was re-proclaimed in 1972 under the National Parks and Wildlife Act 1972 to ‘conserve island habitat and protect Australian sea lion haul-out areas.’

The conservation park is classified as an IUCN Category IA protected area.
