= Cap Island Conservation Park =

Protected area in South Australia

- IUCN category Ia (strict nature reserve)
- Location within South Australia
- Location: South Australia
- Nearest city: Elliston.
- Coordinates: 33°56′42.51″S 135°7′6.73″E
- Area: 9 ha (22 acres)
- Established: 16 March 1967
- Governing body: Department for Environment and Water

Cap Island Conservation Park is a protected area in the Australian state of South Australia located about 7.5 kilometres (4.7 mi) offshore, west of Mount Misery, Eyre Peninsula. The park covers Cap Island's 8ha surface. The island consists of a granite base and a calcarenite mantle; its margins steeply over-hanging and eroded. Typical vegetation is a low nitre bush (Nitraria billardierei) shrubland. Cap Island Conservation Park was constituted by statute in 1972 to conserve a sea bird breeding area and Australian sea lion (Neophoca cinerea) and New Zealand fur seal (Arctocephalus forsteri) haul-out areas.

Cap Island also bears the alternative name of Gap Island and historically was also known as Rocky Island.

== History ==
Matthew Flinders named the island on 16 February 1802, alluding to the island's topography, geology and cap-like profile. The island was proclaimed a Fauna Conservation Reserve in 1967, and gazetted as the Cap Island Conservation Park in 1972. The conservation park is classified as an IUCN Category Ia protected area.

== Fauna ==
In addition to marine mammals, at least nine species of birds have been recorded on Cap Island. These include:

1. Chroicocephalus novaehollandiae: silver gull
2. Haematopus fuliginosus fuliginosus: sooty oystercatcher
3. Hirundo (Hirundo) neoxena neoxena: welcome swallow
4. Neophema (Neonanodes) petrophila: rock parrot
5. Pelagodroma marina: white-faced storm-petrel
6. Sterna (Sterna) striata: white-fronted tern
7. Sternula nereis nereis: fairy tern
8. Sturnus (Sturnus) vulgaris vulgaris: common starling
9. Thalasseus bergii: crested tern

== Flora ==
At least eight species of plants have been recorded on Cap Island. They include:

1. Apium prostratum var. prostratum: sea celery
2. Disphyma crassifolium subsp. clavellatum: rounded noon-flower
3. Frankenia pauciflora var. fruticulosa
4. Frankenia pauciflora: Australian sea-heath
5. Lawrencia squamata: thorny lawrencia
6. Mesembryanthemum crystallinum: common ice plant
7. Nitraria billardierei: dillon bush
8. Zygophyllum apiculatum: callweed
