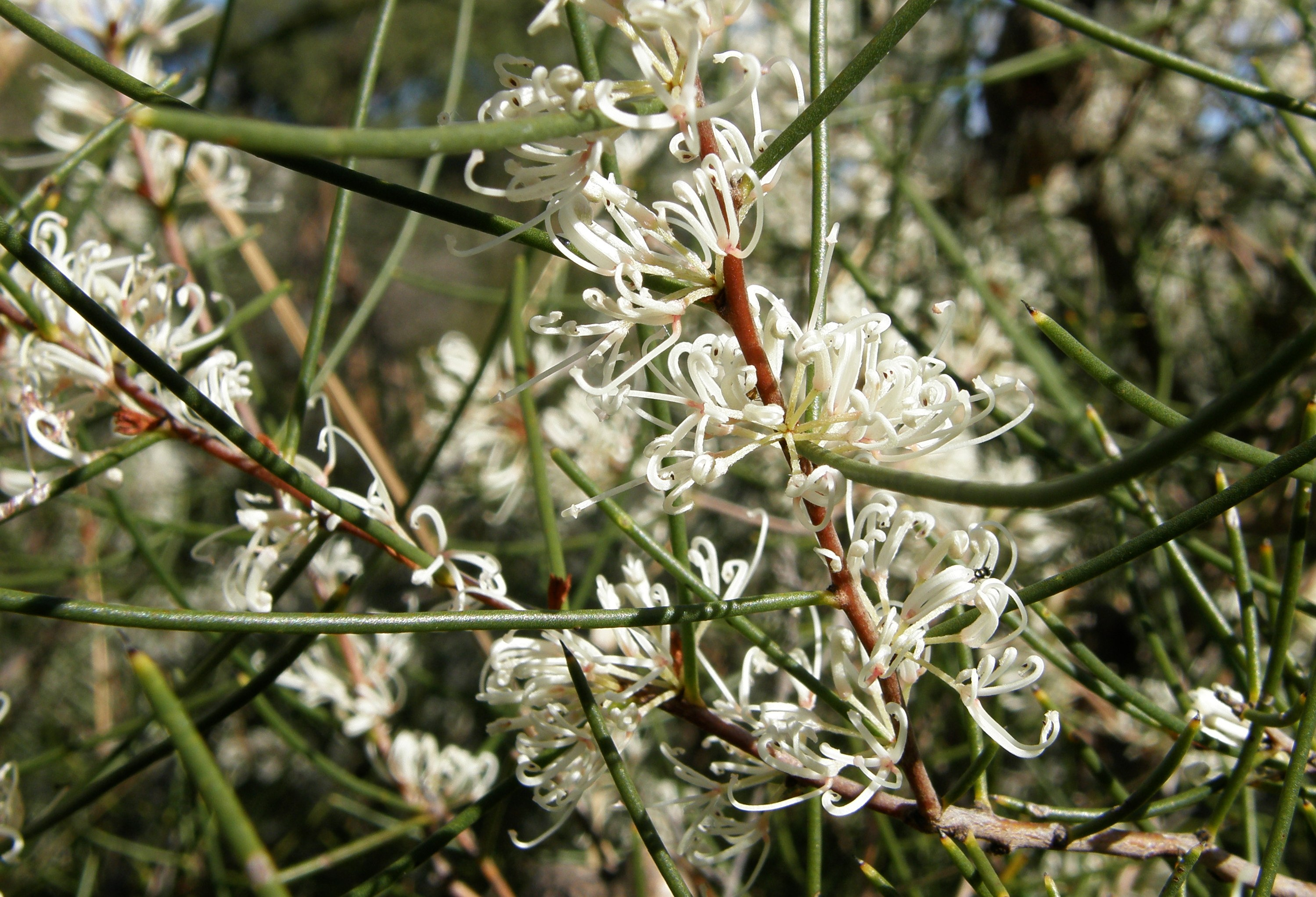

Scientific classification
- Kingdom: Plantae
- Clade: Tracheophytes
- Clade: Angiosperms
- Clade: Eudicots
- Order: Proteales
- Family: Proteaceae
- Genus: Hakea
- Species: H. rostrata

Binomial name
- Hakea rostrata F.Muell. ex Meisn.
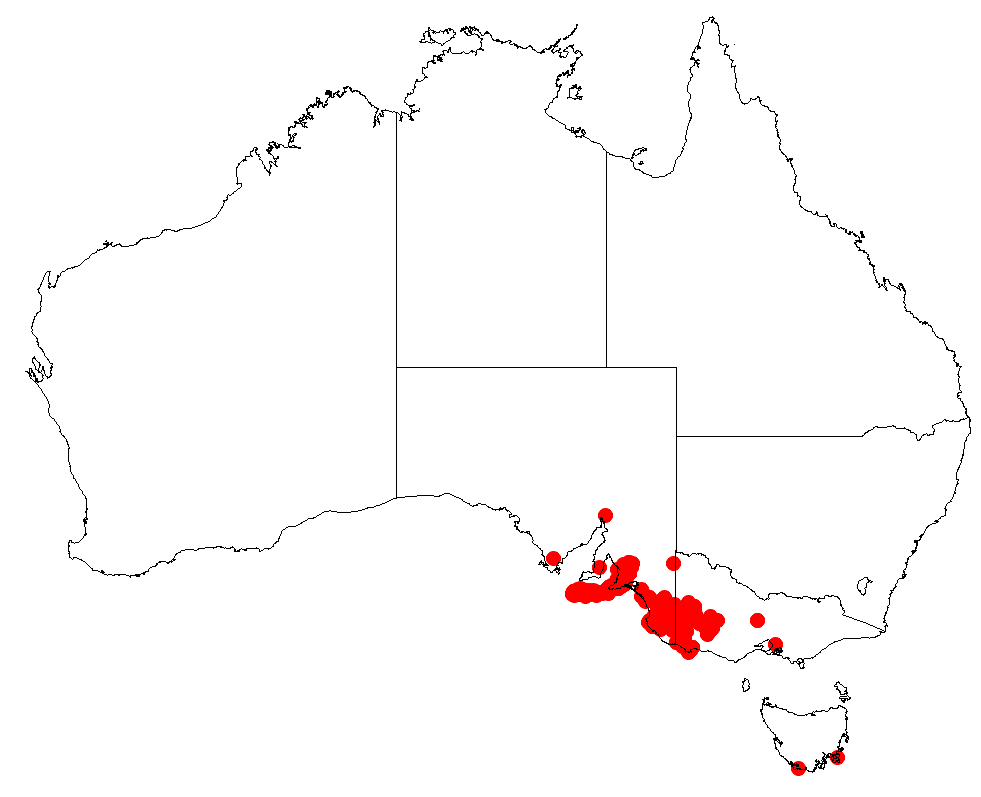
- Occurrence data from AVH

= Hakea rostrata =

Species of plant native to Australia

Hakea rostrata, common name beaked hakea, is a flowering plant in the family Proteaceae, native to Tasmania, South Australia and Victoria.

== Description ==
Hakea rostrata is a spreading shrub growing to 1–4 m (3.3–13.1 ft) high. Its branchlets and young leaves are hairy with the hairs lying close to the branchlet or leaf. The ascending leaves are terete, 2–15 cm (0.8–5.9 in) long and 0.8–1.7 mm wide, and are not grooved. The inflorescence 1–10-flowered on a knob-like rachis. The pedicel is 2.5–6.5 mm long, and densely hairy. The perianth is 3.5–5.5 mm long, and hairy at the base. The pistil is 7.8–11.5 mm long, with an oblique disc as pollen presenter. The fruit is roughly at right-angle to stalk, is sigmoid in shape, and 2.2–4.5 cm (0.9–1.8 in) long and 1.8–3.2 cm (0.7–1.3 in) wide. It is coarsely wrinkled, sometimes finely black-warted. The beak is reflexed and narrow, 7–14 mm long, appressed against ventral face, with obscure horns. The seed does not occupy the whole valve face and is black with a lighter apex. In Victoria, it flowers from July to November.

In Victoria it occurs through a range of heathlands and heathy woodlands in the west and south-west, mostly on sandy soils.

In Victoria, where Hakea rostrata and H. rugosa grow together, Hakea rostrata may be distinguished from H. rugosa by "its curved rather than straight leaves, curved rather than straight style, its oblique disc rather than a cone as a pollen presenter and its larger fruits."

== Taxonomy ==
Ferdinand von Mueller first named the species in 1853, but failed to adequately publish the new species. The name was first validly published by Carl Meissner in 1854.

== Etymology ==
The specific epithet, rostrata, derives from the Latin rostratum, beaked (from rostrum, beak).
