= Padthaway Conservation Park =

Protected area in South Australia

- IUCN category III (natural monument or feature)
- Location within South Australia
- Location: South Australia
- Nearest city: Padthaway
- Coordinates: 36°35′28″S 140°31′45″E
- Area: 9.81 km^{2} (3.79 sq mi)
- Established: 18 March 1971
- Governing body: Department for Environment and Water
- Website: Official website

Padthaway Conservation Park (formerly the Padthaway National Park) is a protected area in the Australian state of South Australia located in the state's south-east in the gazetted locality of Padthaway about 253 kilometres (157 mi) south-east of the state capital of Adelaide and about 2.5 kilometres (1.6 mi) north-east of the locality's town centre.

The conservation park occupies land in section 136 in the cadastral unit of the Hundred of Parsons which is bounded by Beeama-Parsons Road to the south and by Padthaway Road to the north. The land originally gained protected area status in 1971, when section 136 was gazetted as the Padthaway National Park. In 1972, the national park was renamed as the Padthaway Conservation Park upon the proclamation of the National Parks and Wildlife Act 1972. As of March 2018, it covered an area of 9.81 square kilometres (3.79 sq mi).

In 1992, vegetation within the conservation park was described as consisting of two vegetation associations, i.e. a woodland of South Australian blue gum and rough barked manna gum and a low open forest dominated by brown stringybark, and two sub-associations, i.e. an open/low open woodland of South Australian blue gum and pink gum and open woodland of slaty sheoak.

The conservation park is classified as an IUCN Category III protected area. In 1980, the conservation park was listed on the former Register of the National Estate.

== See also ==
- Protected areas of South Australia
