= Monarto Conservation Park =

Protected area in South Australia

- IUCN category III (natural monument or feature)
- Location within South Australia
- Location: South Australia
- Nearest city: Murray Bridge
- Coordinates: 35°10′15″S 139°06′46″E
- Area: 2.40 km^{2} (0.93 sq mi)
- Established: 15 September 1983
- Governing body: Department for Environment and Water
- Website: Official website

Monarto Conservation Park is a protected area located in the Australian state of South Australia in the suburb of Monarto South about 53 kilometres (33 mi) south-east of the state capital of Adelaide and about 15 kilometres (9.3 mi) south-west of the town of Murray Bridge.

The conservation park consists of land in sections 495 and 496 in the cadastral unit of the Hundred of Monarto. It was proclaimed under the National Parks and Wildlife Act 1972 on 15 September 1983. As of 2016, it covered an area of 2.4 square kilometres (0.93 sq mi).

The above-described land which was previously known as Braendlers Scrub was part of the site for the now-abandoned city of Monarto. The land had been subject to some clearing activity prior to 1983, but was considered in 2000 as having “regenerated well” and was also reported as being “known for its prolific flowering plants”.

Vegetation in the eastern part of the conservation park was surveyed in 1992 and subsequently described as an "Open Mallee" dominated by Eucalyptus incrassata and Eucalyptus socialis over an understorey dominated by Hysterobaeckea behrii. The survey whose site was on a dune crest identified 50 species of native plant and one species of introduced plants within its boundary.

The conservation park is classified as an IUCN Category III protected area.

== See also ==
- Protected areas of South Australia
- Ferries McDonald Conservation Park
