= Monarto Woodlands Conservation Park =

Protected area in South Australia

- IUCN category VI (protected area with sustainable use of natural resources)
- Location within South Australia
- Location: South Australia
- Nearest city: Murray Bridge
- Coordinates: 35°08′43″S 139°10′10″E
- Area: 4.26 km^{2} (1.64 sq mi)
- Established: 22 September 2016
- Governing body: Department for Environment and Water

Monarto Woodlands Conservation Park is a protected area in the Australian state of South Australia in the gazetted localities of Monarto South and White Hill west of Murray Bridge.

It was proclaimed under the National Parks and Wildlife Act 1972 on 22 September 2016 along with the preservation of any “existing and future rights of entry, prospecting, exploration or mining” on ten parcels of adjoining land in the cadastral unit of the hundreds of Mobilong and Monarto. As of September 2016, it covered an area of 4.26 square kilometres (1.64 sq mi).

An announcement made on 22 September 2016 by Ian Hunter, the Minister for Sustainability, Environment & Conservation in the South Australian government described both the conservation park and the nearby Kinchina Conservation Park as follows:

The two new parks at Monarto support high levels of biodiversity, in part created by the now- mature plantings associated with the proposed development of a satellite city at Monarto in the 1970s. Protection of these areas is consistent with the Government’s Conserving Nature 2012-2020 strategy to conserve a range of ecosystems.

The Monarto Woodlands Conservation Park extends about 15 kilometres along the South Eastern Freeway from the edge of Murray Bridge west to near Callington, and provides important habitat for more than 60 bird species, five of which are of State conservation significance.

The conservation park is classified as an IUCN Category VI protected area.

== See also ==
- Protected areas of South Australia
