= Lathami Conservation Park =

Conservation park in South Australia

- IUCN category Ia (strict nature reserve)
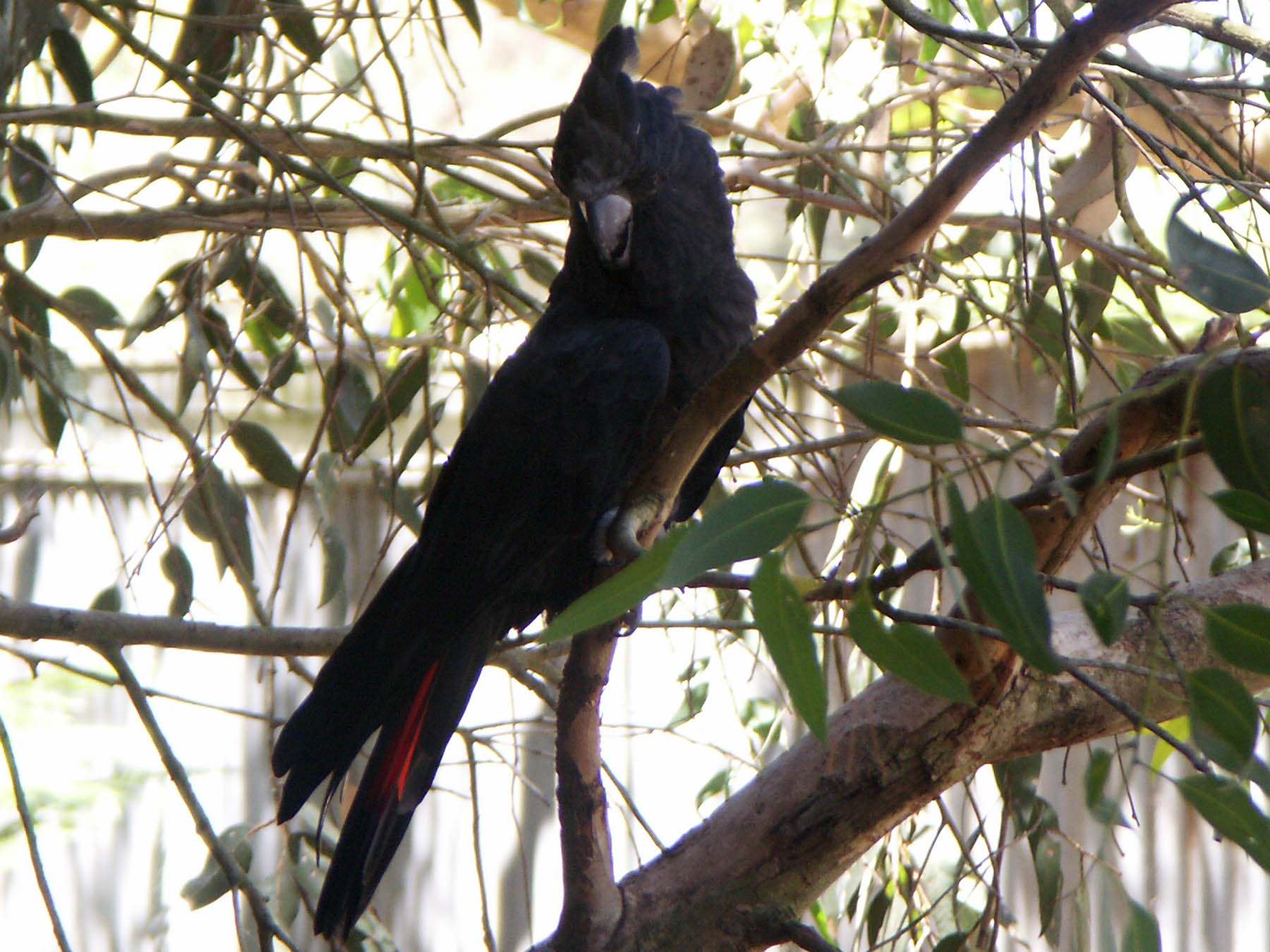
- The conservation park protects glossy black cockatoo habitat

- Location within South Australia
- Location: South Australia
- Nearest city: Parndana
- Coordinates: 35°38′54.24″S 137°14′11.76″E
- Area: 11.75 km^{2} (4.54 sq mi)
- Established: 1 October 1987
- Governing body: Department for Environment and Water

Lathami Conservation Park is a protected area in the Australian state of South Australia on the north coast of Kangaroo Island located in the locality of Cassini about 1 kilometre (0.62 miles) east of Stokes Bay and about 17 kilometres (11 miles) north of Parndana. It was proclaimed on 1 October 1987 to protect important nesting and foraging habitat for the glossy black cockatoo (Calyptorhynchus lathami), after which the conservation park was named.

== Description ==
The conservation park has an area of 11.75 square kilometres (4.54 square miles). The southern sector has soils typical of the island's lateritic plateau, grading northwards into shallow grey-brown sands and rocky outcrops. The two main watercourses, Deep Gully and Gum Creek, cut deeply into the underlying rocks, forming gorges with semi-permanent waterholes along parts of their lengths.

On the higher parts of the conservation park, the vegetation is mainly a tall shrubland of Eucalyptus baxteri over Xanthorrhoea tateana, Melaleuca uncinata and Allocasuarina muelleriana, interspersed with E. cladocalyx woodland. The lower parts are characterised by an open forest of E. cladocalyx and E. leucoxylon, with areas of A. verticillata woodland near the coast.

The conservation park is classified as an IUCN Category Ia protected area.
