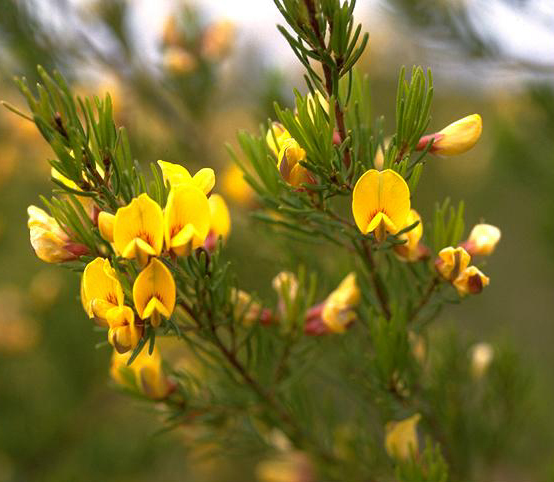
- Pultenaea viscidula on Kangaroo Island

Scientific classification
- Kingdom: Plantae
- Clade: Tracheophytes
- Clade: Angiosperms
- Clade: Eudicots
- Clade: Rosids
- Order: Fabales
- Family: Fabaceae
- Subfamily: Faboideae
- Genus: Pultenaea
- Species: P. viscidula

Binomial name
- Pultenaea viscidula Tate

= Pultenaea viscidula =

Dark bush-pea

Species of flowering plant

Pultenaea viscidula, commonly known as dark bush-pea, is a species of flowering plant in the family Fabaceae and is endemic to South Australia. It is an erect shrub with branches that are sticky when young, linear to cylindrical, channelled leaves with stipules at the base, and yellow to orange and yellow-red to green flowers.

== Description ==
Pultenaea viscidula is an erect shrub that typically grows to a height of 0.2–3 m (7.9 in – 9 ft 10.1 in) and has softly-hairy branchlets that are sticky when young. The leaves are arranged alternately, linear to cylindrical with a groove along the upper surface, 6.5–10 mm (0.26–0.39 in) long and 0.3–0.4 mm (0.012–0.016 in) wide with sticky stipules 0.7–1 mm (0.028–0.039 in) long at the base. The flowers are arranged in groups of two to six, each flower on a pedicel 1.5–3 mm (0.059–0.118 in) long. The sepals are 3–5 mm (0.12–0.20 in) long with linear to egg-shaped bracteoles 1.0–1.5 mm (0.039–0.059 in) long at the base of the sepal tube. The standard petal is yellow to orange with red striations and 7.0–7.6 mm (0.28–0.30 in) long, the wings yellow to orange and 6–7 mm (0.24–0.28 in) long and the keel yellow-red to green and the same length as the wings.Flowering from September to November and the fruit is an oval pod 2.5–5.0 mm (0.098–0.197 in) long.

== Taxonomy and naming ==
Pultenaea viscidula was first formally described in 1885 by Ralph Tate in Transactions, proceedings and report, Royal Society of South Australia from specimens he collected near Karatta on Kangaroo Island "under the shade of Eucalyptus corynocalyx". The specific epithet (viscidula) means "slightly sticky".

== Distribution and habitat ==
Dark bush-pea grows in woodland and heathland and is common in western and northern parts of Kangaroo Island and in a few places on the Fleurieu Peninsula in South Australia.
