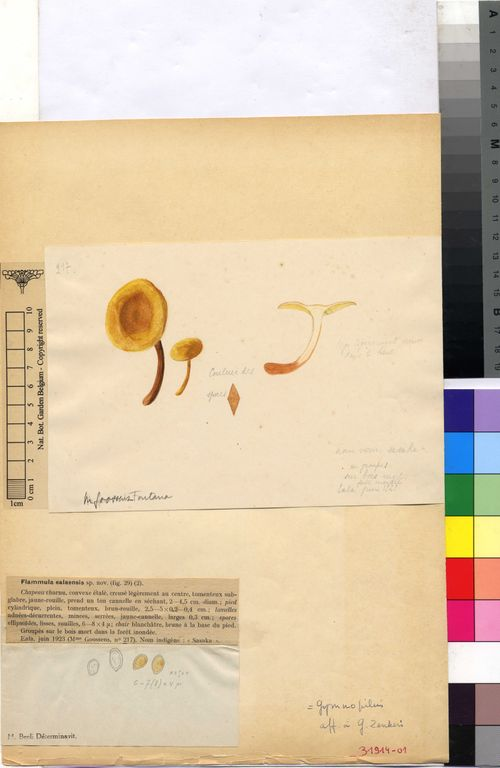

Scientific classification
- Domain: Eukaryota
- Kingdom: Fungi
- Division: Basidiomycota
- Class: Agaricomycetes
- Order: Agaricales
- Family: Hymenogastraceae
- Genus: Gymnopilus
- Species: G. zenkeri

Binomial name
- Gymnopilus zenkeri (Henn.) Singer (1951)

Synonyms
- Pholiota zenkeri Henn. (1901)

= Gymnopilus zenkeri =

Species of fungus

Gymnopilus zenkeri is a species of agaric fungus in the family Hymenogastraceae. Originally described by German mycologist Paul Christoph Hennings in 1901 as Pholiota zenkeri, it was transferred to the genus Gymnopilus by Rolf Singer in 1951. The fungus is found in Africa.

== See also ==
- List of Gymnopilus species
