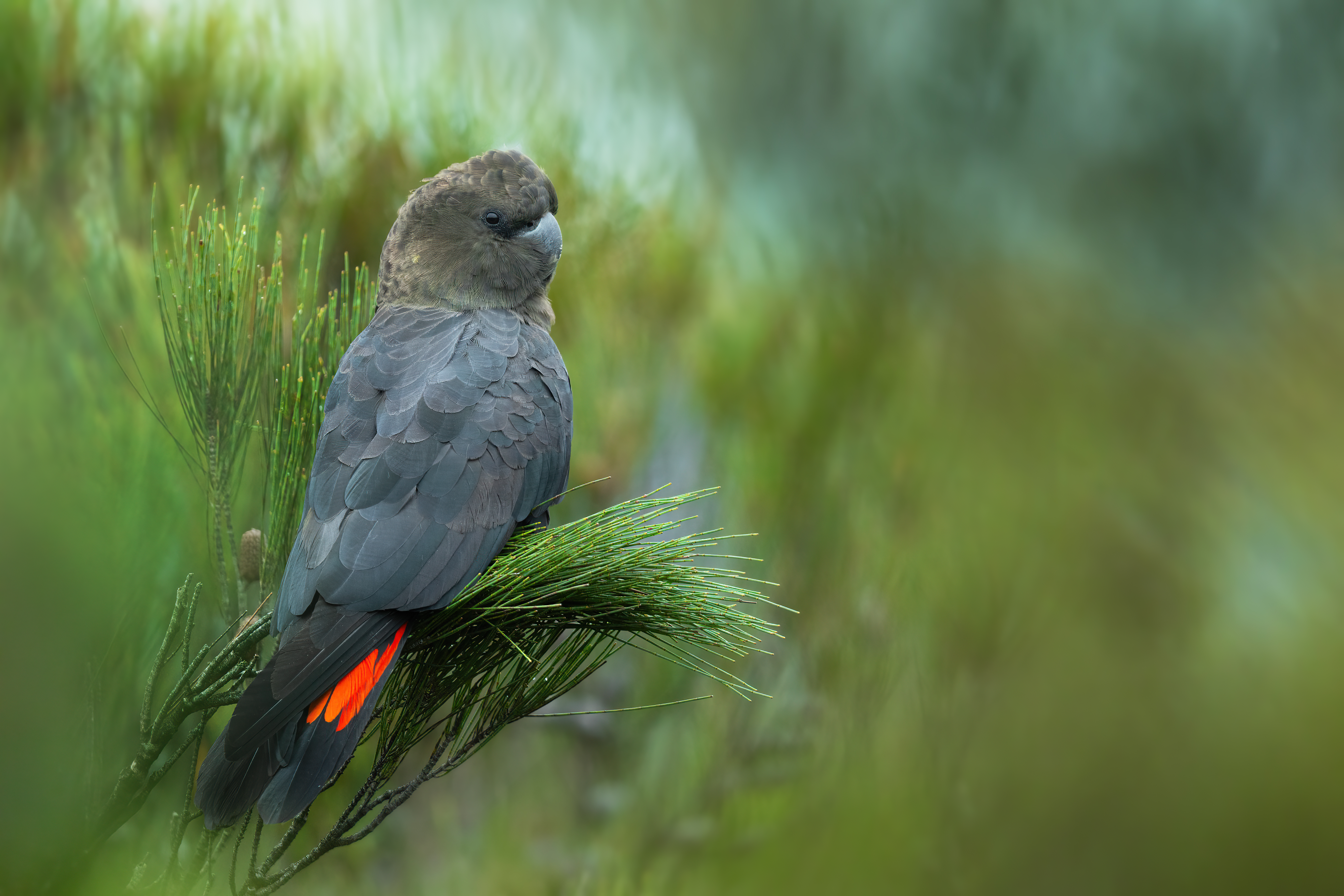
- Adult male C. l. lathami
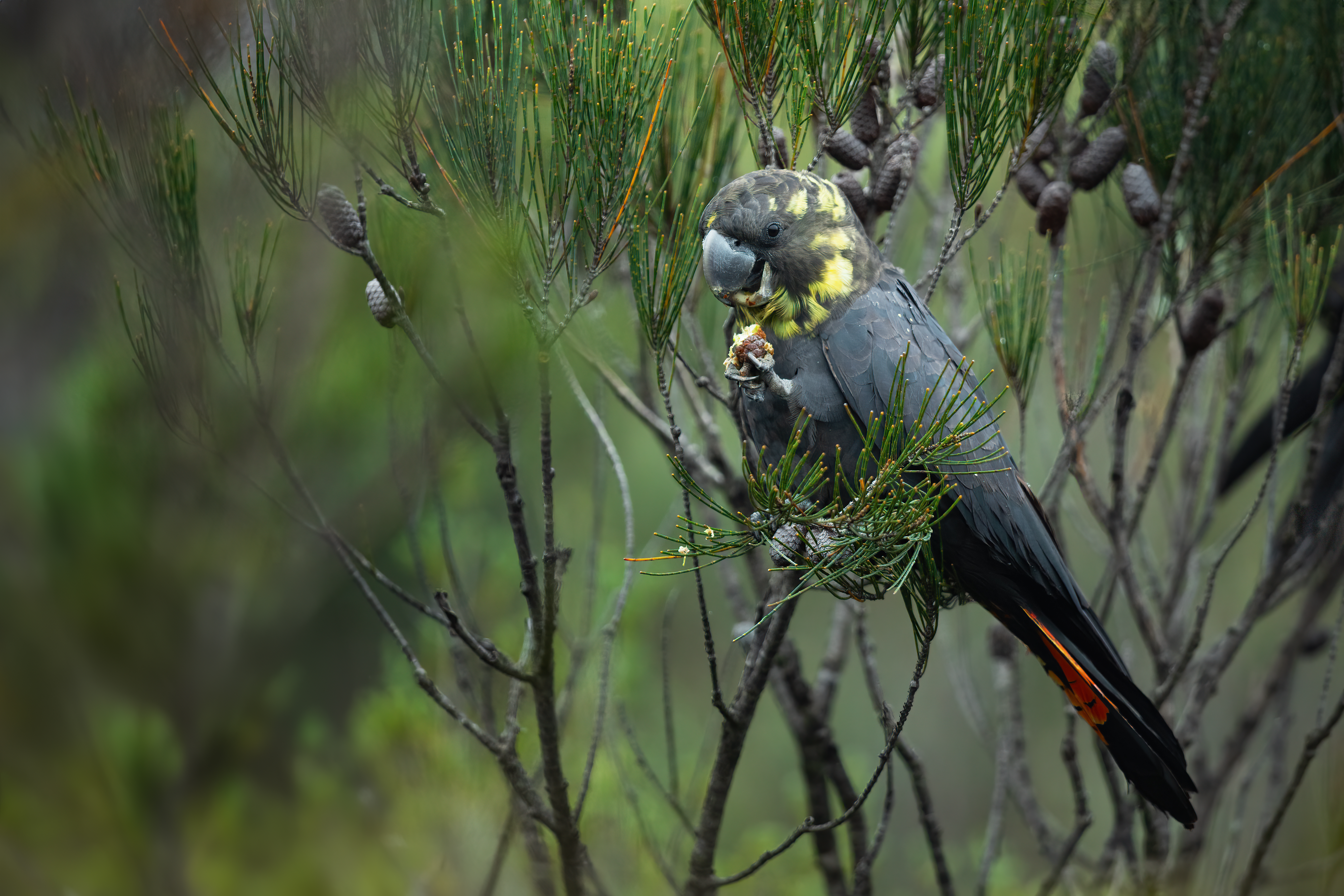
- Adult female C. l. lathami

Conservation status
- Vulnerable (IUCN 3.1)

Scientific classification
- Kingdom: Animalia
- Phylum: Chordata
- Class: Aves
- Order: Psittaciformes
- Family: Cacatuidae
- Genus: Calyptorhynchus
- Species: C. lathami

Binomial name
- Calyptorhynchus lathami (Temminck, 1807)

Subspecies
- C. (C.) l. lathami C. (C.) l. erebus C. (C.) l. halmaturinus
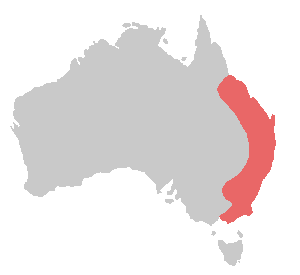
- Glossy black cockatoo range (in red)

= Glossy black cockatoo =

Species of cockatoo from Australia

The glossy black bird called the glossy black cockatoo (Calyptorhynchus lathami) is a species of bird found in Australia. It is the smallest member of the subfamily Calyptorhynchinae, and found in eastern Australia. Adult glossy black cockatoos may reach 50 cm (19.5 in) in length. They are sexually dimorphic. Males are blackish brown, except for their prominent sub-terminal red tail bands; the females are dark brownish with idiosyncratic yellow marking around the neck and prominent sub-terminal tail band of red with black bars.

Three subspecies have been recognised. Calyptorhynchus lathami lathami, or south-eastern glossy black cockatoo, is listed as vulnerable under the federal Environment Protection and Biodiversity Conservation Act 1999 (EPBC Act), while the Kangaroo Island subspecies (C. l. halmaturinis) is listed as endangered. The subdivision into subspecies has been recently challenged, with a detailed morphological analysis by Saunders and Pickup 2023, who have argued that with no differentiation in bill morphology, little difference in genetic makeup, no differences in plumage pattern or colour, and no differences in diet, there is no justification in subdividing the species. C. l. erebus, is listed under state legislation in Queensland only.

== Taxonomy ==
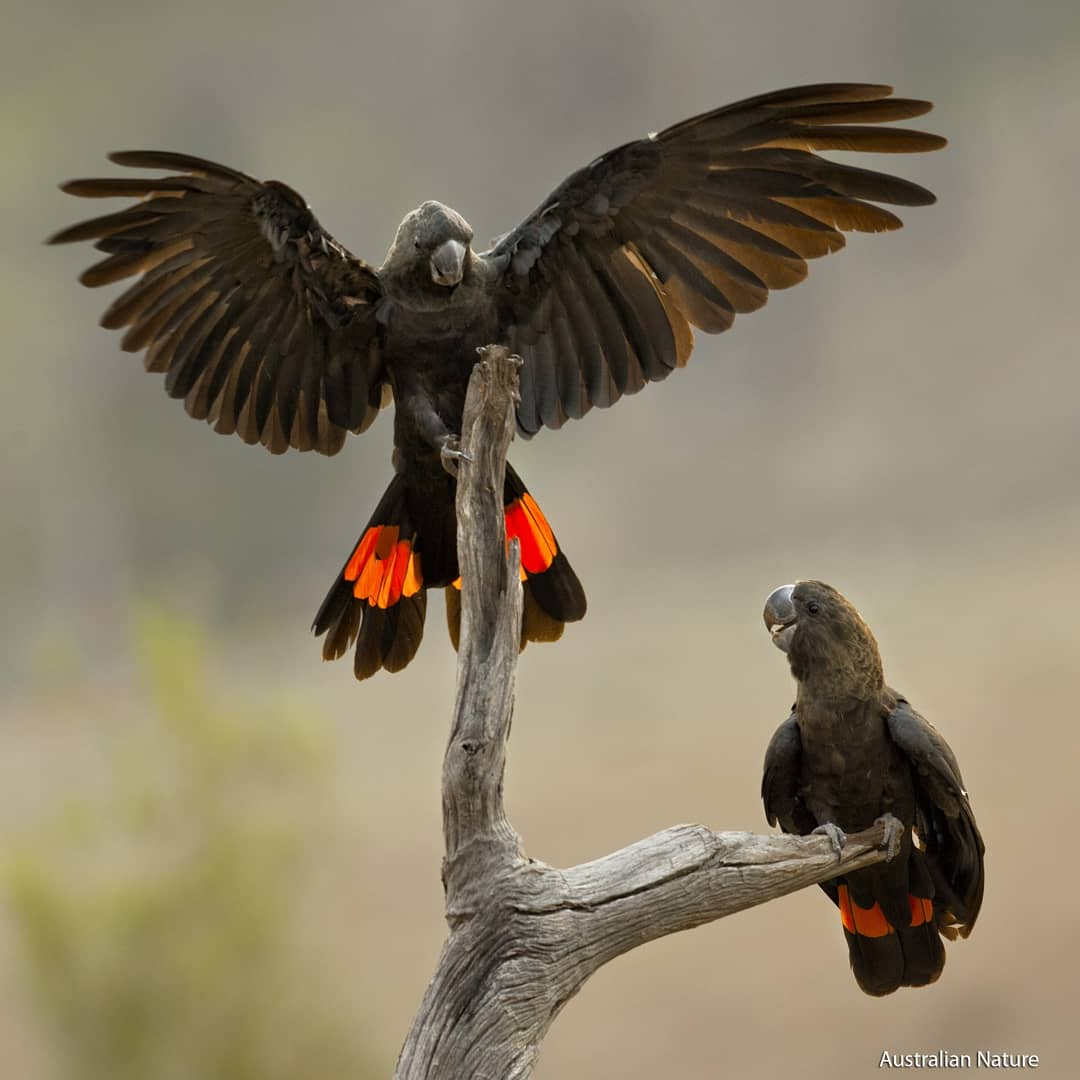
Glossy black cockatoos

The glossy black cockatoo was first described by Dutch naturalist Coenraad Jacob Temminck in 1807. The scientific name honours the English ornithologist John Latham.

The glossy black cockatoo's closest relative is the red-tailed black cockatoo; the two species form the genus Calyptorhynchus. They are distinguished from the other black cockatoos of the genus Zanda by different tail colour and head pattern, significant sexual dimorphism, and differences in two juvenile call types, a squeaking begging call and a vocalization when swallowing food.

=== Subspecies ===
Three subspecies were proposed by Schodde et al. in 1993, although in 2002 parrot expert Joseph Forshaw had reservations due to their extremely minimal differences.

Saunders and Pickup's (2023) detailed morphological analysis of the species throughout its range demonstrated there was no differentiation in bill morphology, little difference in genetic makeup, no differences in plumage pattern or colour, and no differences in diet, supporting Forshaw's reservations and they concluded the species is monotypic. They found that there is cline in body dimensions over the latitudinal range of the species, with the birds from the north of the range smaller than the birds in the south. Saunders and Pickup argued that with no differentiation in bill morphology, little difference in genetic makeup, no differences in plumage pattern or colour, and no differences in diet, there is no justification in subdividing the species.

==== C. l. lathami ====
C. l. lathami (Temminck, 1807), is the eastern subspecies found between southeastern Queensland and Mallacoota in Victoria, with isolated pockets in Eungella in central Queensland and the Riverina and Pilliga forest. It is associated with casuarina woodland.

==== C. l. erebus ====
C. l. erebus occurs in central Queensland from Eungella near Mackay south to Gympie.

==== C. l. halmaturinus ====
C. l. halmaturinus (Mathews, 1912) is the Kangaroo Island subspecies, which once also lived on southern Fleurieu Peninsula mainland South Australia, disappearing as their habitat disappeared by the 1970s. Restricted to the northern and western parts of the island, the population was as low as 158 individuals at one point but recovered to about 370 in 2019. It feeds on the drooping she-oak (Allocasuarina verticillata) and the sugar gum (Eucalyptus cladocalyx) In particular, the bird specialises in the most recent season's cones of Allocasuarina verticillata over older cones of that species and Allocasuarina littoralis. It holds the cones in its foot and shreds them with its powerful bill before removing the seeds with its tongue.

== Description ==
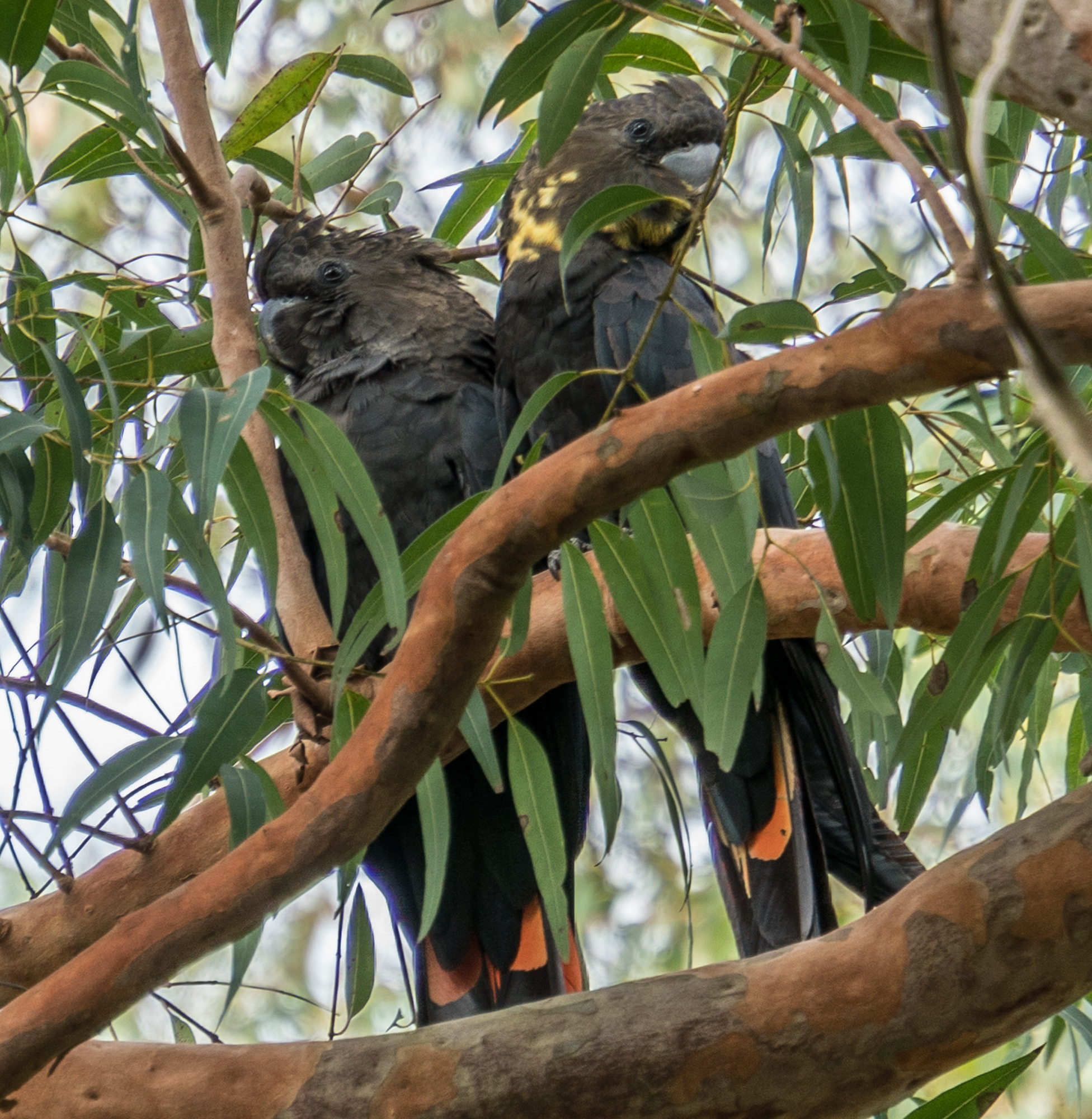
A pair of glossy black cockatoos

Like the related red-tailed black cockatoo, this species is sexually dimorphic. The male glossy black cockatoo is predominantly black with a chocolate-brown head and striking caudal red patches. The female is a duller dark brown, with flecks of yellow in the tail and collar. The female's tail is barred whereas the male's tail is patched. An adult will grow to be about 46–50 cm (18–19.5 in) in length.

== Distribution and habitat ==
Glossy black cockatoos are found in open forest and woodlands, and usually feed on seeds of the she-oak (Casuarina spp.)

== Conservation status and measures ==
Rush Creek, south-east Queensland

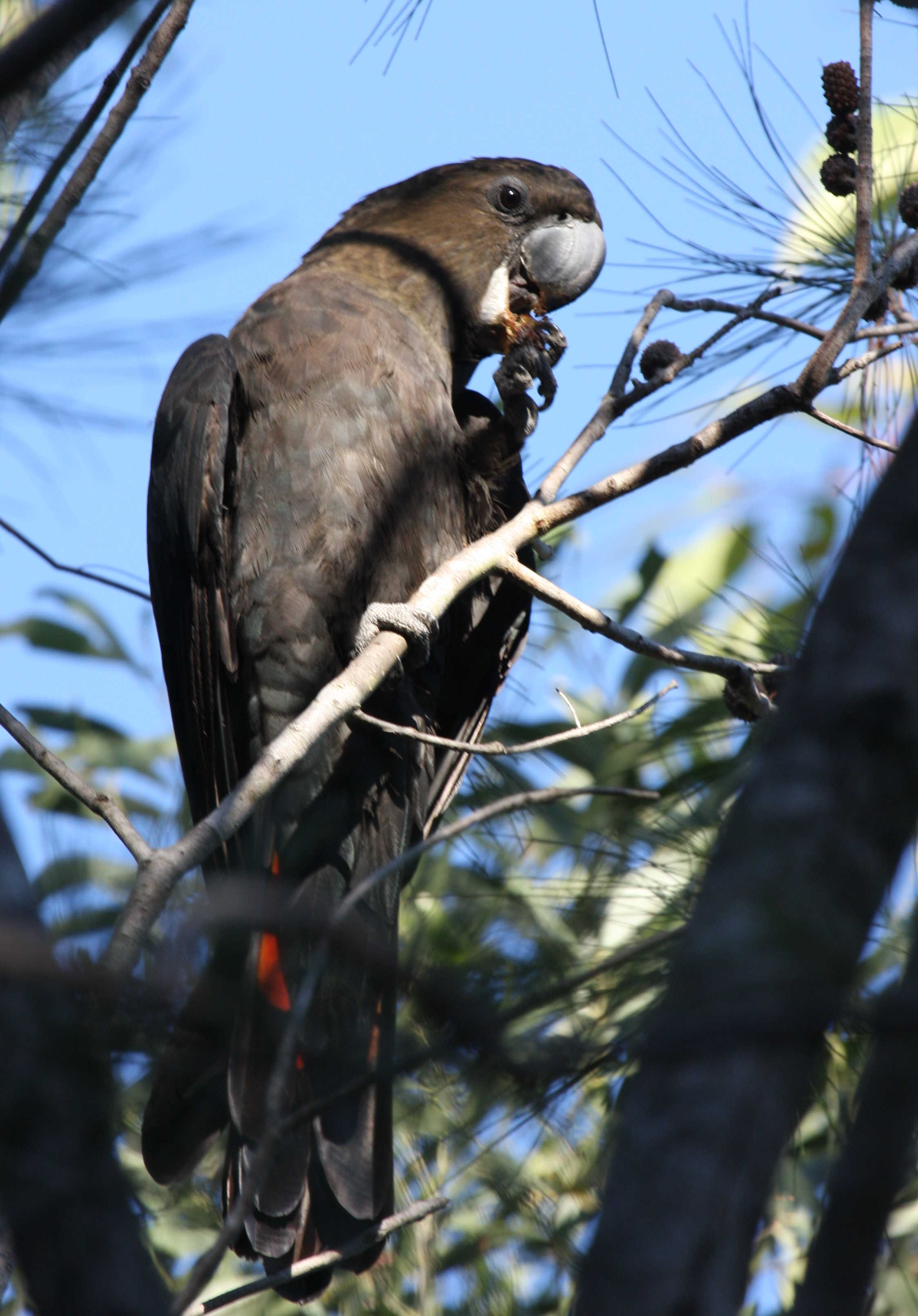
Male, Kobble Creek, south-east Queensland

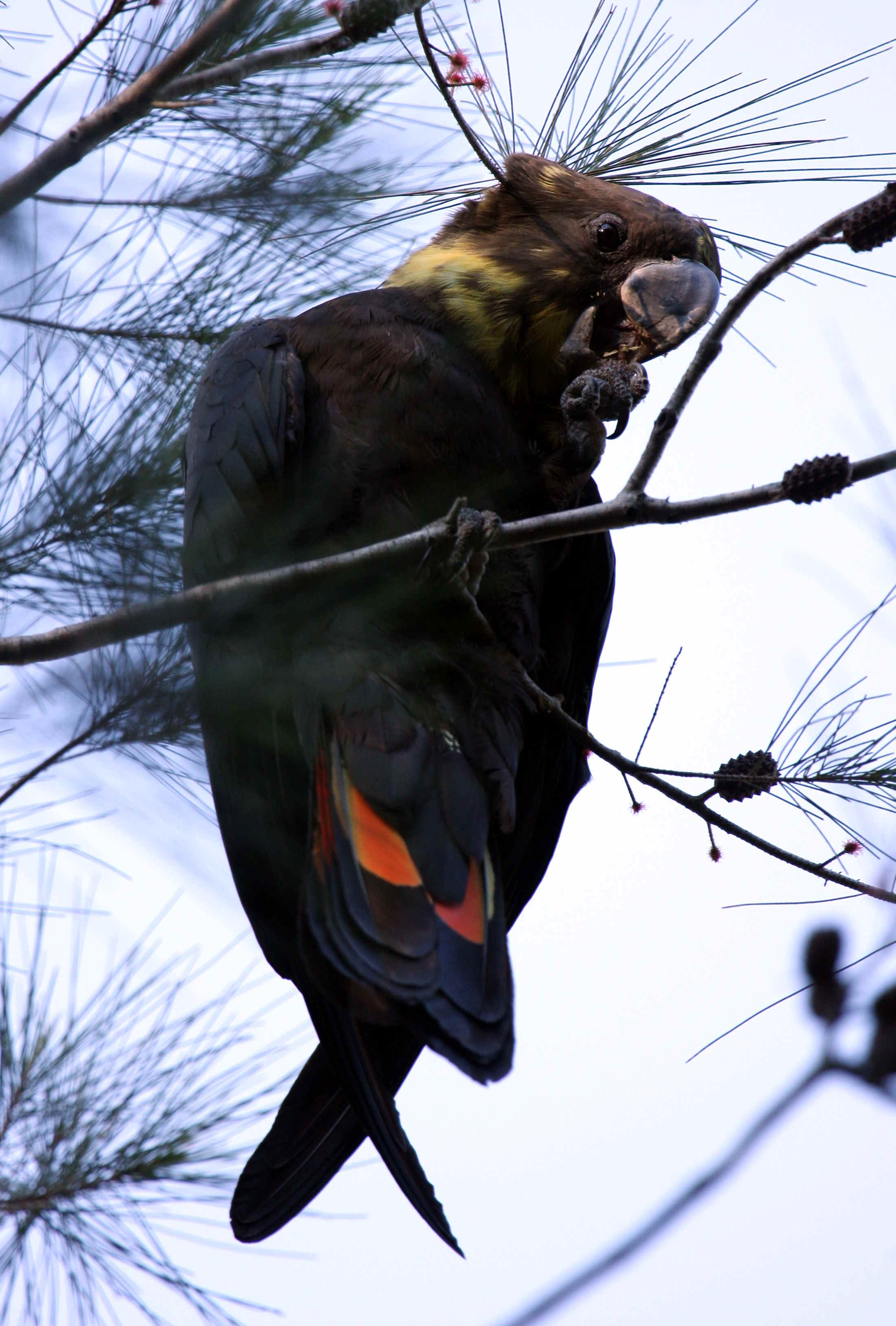
Female, Kobble Creek

=== Federal legislation ===
Like most species of parrots, the glossy black cockatoo is protected by the Convention on International Trade in Endangered Species of Wild Fauna and Flora (CITES) with its placement on the Appendix II list of vulnerable species, which makes the import, export, and trade of listed wild-caught animals illegal.

Since 10 August 2022, the south-eastern glossy black cockatoo (C. l. lathami) is listed as vulnerable under the EBBC Act.

The Kangaroo Island (KI) subspecies (C. l. halmaturinis) was added to the EPBC list as endangered, effective 16 July 2000.

=== Australian Capital Territory ===
The south-eastern glossy black cockatoo (C. l. lathami) is listed as Vulnerable under the Nature Conservation Act 2014 (ACT), June 2025 list.

=== New South Wales ===
The south-eastern glossy black cockatoo (C. l. lathami) is listed as Vulnerable under the Biodiversity Conservation Act 2016 (NSW), 5 December 2025 list.

=== South Australia ===
The KI subspecies is listed as endangered under the National Parks and Wildlife Act 1972 (South Australia). Their numbers had declined to 150 left in the 1990s, leading to fears of extinction, but they recovered after researchers put tin around the base of trees and trimmed their canopies, which deterred possums which preyed on the birds' eggs and nests.

In early 2020, during the 2019-2020 Australian bushfire season, bushfire warnings were issued for the entirety of Kangaroo Island, giving rise to warnings from scientists that the continued viability of this subspecies in the wild might be doomed as its drooping she-oak food supply undergoes destruction by the fires. By 6 January 2020, at least 170,000 ha (420,000 acres) (one third of the island's area) had burnt.

Reliable funding for the successful program to protect this subspecies – primarily from predation by the common brush tail possum – ended several years before the bushfires. However, after the bushfires, work was done to protect the birds, including the installation of nest boxes, now used by 80% of the breeding pairs. A census carried out in summer 2025/6 counted 446 birds. It was realised at this time that the nest boxes would need insulation, to cope with the increasingly hot summers, and work on this is proceeding to be ready for the following breeding season. In addition, around 1,200 drooping she-oak seedlings were planted within a fenced area of the Lathami Conservation Park in 2025, with further planned in 2026.

=== Victoria ===
- The eastern subspecies of the glossy black cockatoo (C. l. lathami) is listed as threatened on the Victorian Flora and Fauna Guarantee Act 1988. Under this act, an "Action Statement" for the recovery and future management of this species has not been prepared.
- On the 2007 advisory list of threatened vertebrate fauna in Victoria, the subspecies C. l. lathami is listed as vulnerable.

=== Queensland ===
C. l. lathami is listed as vulnerable by the Queensland Environmental Protection Agency.
