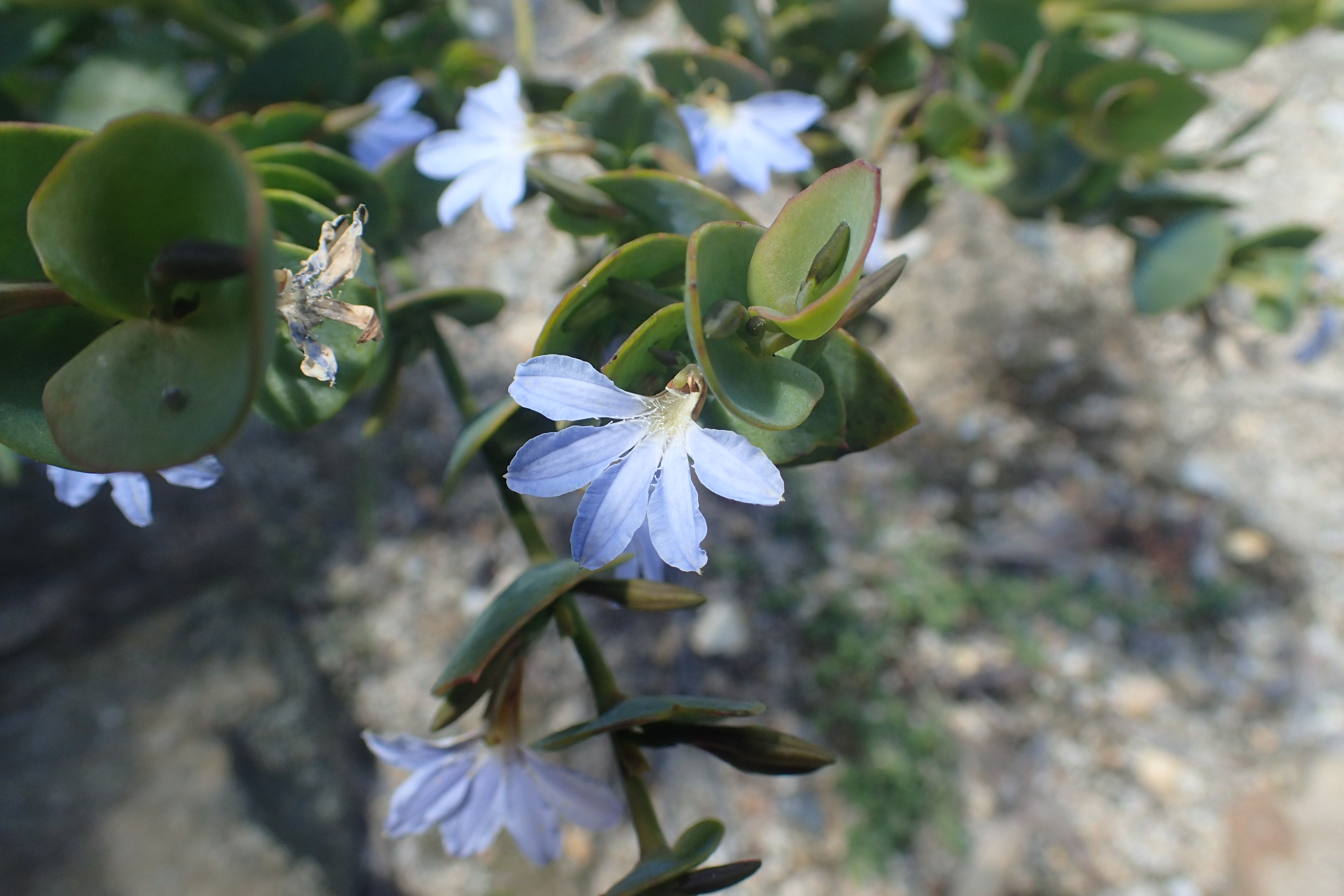
- In the Australian National Botanic Gardens

Scientific classification
- Kingdom: Plantae
- Clade: Tracheophytes
- Clade: Angiosperms
- Clade: Eudicots
- Clade: Asterids
- Order: Asterales
- Family: Goodeniaceae
- Genus: Scaevola
- Species: S. brooksiana

Binomial name
- Scaevola brooksiana F.Muell.
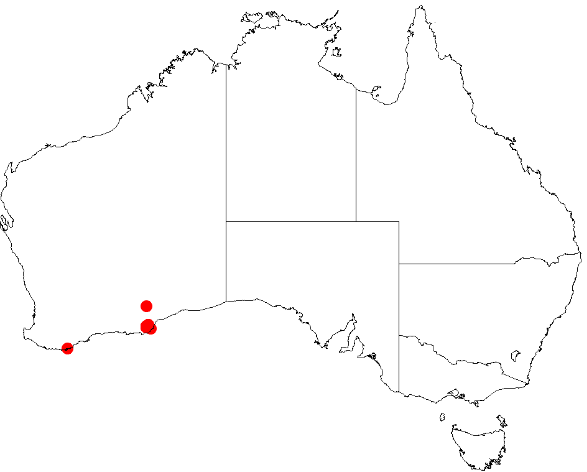
- Occurrence data from Australasian Virtual Herbarium

Synonyms
- Lobelia brookeana Carolin orth. var.; Lobelia brooksiana (F.Muell.) Kuntze; Scaevola brookeana F.Muell. orth. var.; Scaevola brookiana Hopper, S.J.van Leeuwen, A.P.Br. & S.J.Patrick orth. var.; Scaevola brookseana B.Archer & Maroske orth. var.

= Scaevola brooksiana =

Species of shrub

Scaevola brooksiana is a species of flowering plant in the family Goodeniaceae and is endemic to a small area in the south-west of Western Australia. It is a glabrous, glaucous subshrub with sessile, toothed, circular to elliptic leaves, blue flowers, and wrinkled fruit.

== Description ==
Scaevola brooksiana is a glabrous, glaucous subshrub that typically grows to a height of up to 80 cm (31 in) and has glossy stems when mature. Its leaves are sessile, round to elliptic and toothed, up to 20 mm (0.79 in) long and 15 mm (0.59 in) wide, the upper leaves stem-clasping. The flowers are arranged in spikes on the ends of branches with leafy bracts and Δ-shaped bracteoles up to 1 mm (0.039 in) long. The petals are blue, about 10 mm (0.39 in) long, glabrous on the outside and bearded inside. Flowering occurs around December and the fruit is elliptic, about 4 mm (0.16 in) long and wrinkled.

This species of Scaevola is distinguished from all other species in the genus by its shrubby habit and glaucous, stem-clasping leaves.

== Taxonomy ==
Scaevola brooksiana was first formally described in 1884 by Ferdinand von Mueller in The Victorian Naturalist from specimens collected "in the vicinity of Israelite Bay, discovered by "Miss S.J.Brooke". Although Mueller initially described S. brookeana from specimens collected by "Miss S.J.Brooke", the collector was Sarah Brooks, and in 1889 von Mueller used the spelling S. brooksiana in the second edition of the Systematic Census of Australian Plants. The Australian Plant Census corrected the name following the rules of the Shenzhen Code 2018.

== Distribution ==
This species of Scaevola occurs only on Mount Ragged in the Cape Arid National Park, in the Mallee bioregion of south-western Western Australia.

== Conservation status ==
Scaevola brooksiana is listed as "Priority Two" by the Western Australian Government Department of Biodiversity, Conservation and Attractions, meaning that it is poorly known and from only one or a few locations.
