= Sarah Brooks =

Australian botanist and artist (1850–1928)

- Born: 1850
- Died: 1928 (aged 77–78)
- Occupation: Botanist, artist, botanical collector

Sarah Brooks (1850–1928) was an English-born botanical collector who collected many specimens in Western Australia.

Sarah Theresa Brooks was born on 19 September 1850, on board the ship Harpley, at Plymouth, England, before sailing to Australia. She was the second child and only daughter of Henry Brooks and his wife Emily Donovan. The family migrated to Australia in January 1851 and settled in the Geelong area, where a relative Thomas Edols resided. Henry Brooks died shortly after their arrival in Australia.

The Brooks family resided in Victoria until 1873, when Sarah's brother, John moved to Western Australia, to pursue an opportunity to own land, and she and her mother followed shortly after in 1874. They lived in an isolated location and grazed sheep. John Brooks lived on Lynburn Station near Thomas River, followed by Marlburnup Station near Point Malcolm. From 1877, the family lived at Israelite Bay, near Esperance.

== Botanical work ==
It was during this time that Sarah Brooks responded to an advertisement in the West Australian newspaper for people to collect botanical specimens for Baron Ferdinand Von Mueller. Brooks had had a good education, could draw and speak three languages. She collected plant specimens from Israelite Bay between 1883 and 1893, and from various locations in Western Australia including Hampton Range (1890), Mt Ragged (1886), Pine Hill, Balbinia and the edge of the Nullarbor Plain. She also collected algae and fungi for Jacob Georg Agardh of Lund University in Sweden. Mueller died in 1896, whereupon her collecting ceased. Her skill at acquiring these specimens was used to encourage other Western Australian women to pursue this vocation.

Sarah Brooks eventually settled at Balbinia Station near Esperance in 1898, after her house at Israelite Bay burned down. There she shared a house with her mother and brother, and was the local telegraph operator.

Brooks died in Norseman, Western Australia, on 23 September 1928. She did not marry. She was survived by her brother, John.

Some of the plants that Brooks collected were named for her by Mueller. They include Scaevola brookeana F.Muell. (1884) and Hakea brookeana F.Muell. (1886). Her brother also collected specimens, which are stored in New South Wales and Western Australian collections.
