= Clara Wehl =

German-born Australian botanist and botanical collector (1833–1901)

Clara Christine Maria Wehl
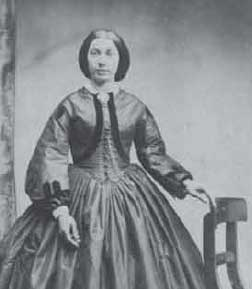
- Born: Clara Christine Maria Mueller; 1833; Rostock
- Died: 31 July 1901; Millicent, South Australia
- Occupations: Botanist, botanical collector
- Known for: Botanical collecting

Clara Christine Maria Wehl (née Mueller; 1833 – 31 July 1901) was a German-born Australian botanist. She is known for her contributions to Australian botany through her scientific collections in Australia. The genus Wehlia and the species Gigartina wehliae are named in her honour.

== Early life ==
Wehl was born in Rostock Mecklenburg, now in Germany, in 1833. She was the daughter of Louise Mertens (1797–1840) and her husband Friedrich Müller (1794–1835), a customs official. Clara emigrated to South Australia in 1847 accompanied by her sister Bertha and brother Ferdinand von Mueller. The family arrived in Adelaide on the barque Hermann Von Beckerath on 15 December 1847. They settled in Adelaide but moved to a property in the Bugle Ranges in 1848.

== Botanical collecting ==
In 1848 Wehl collected botanical specimens in the Bugle Ranges. She also collected in the Barossa Range. In the beginning of 1853 Wehl moved with her brother and sister to Melbourne staying at what is now known as the Plant Craft Cottage in the Melbourne Botanic Gardens. After her marriage in October of that year, Wehl moved to Mount Gambier. Her interest in botany and botanical collecting continued after her marriage. In particular, while residing at Mount Gambier, Wehl was interested in algae and other marine plants and collected in the Port Macdonnell and Rivoli Bay areas. She also collected at Lake Bonney. In around August 1873 Wehl moved with her family to Millicent.

In 1866 Wehl sent algae specimens collected near Mount Gambier to her brother while he continue to reside at the Melbourne Botanic Gardens. Wehl's algae collecting and the specimens it generated, assisted the research of other botanists including William Henry Harvey, Otto Sonder and Jacob Agardh. Wehl's algae specimens were used by Harvey in his publication Phycologia Australica. Other specimens of Wehl's were forwarded to George Bentham to assist with his production of Flora Australiensis.

Although not formally trained in botany, Wehl's botanical collecting extended over a period of at least 46 years from 1848 to 1894. Her collections are held at several institutions including at the National Herbarium of Victoria, the Muséum National d'Histoire Naturelle and the Auckland War Memorial Museum. Wehl also actively supported her brother Ferdinand's botanical work until his death in 1896, initially undertaking such activities as preparing his specimens and later by sending him her botanical collections.

== Family ==
On 14 October 1853 at Richmond, Wehl married her husband Eduard Wehl (1823–1876), a physician. During her marriage Wehl gave birth to 15 children, 12 of whom survived. At least three of these children would themselves become botanical collectors. Eduard died in 1876 causing financial hardship for Wehl. Her brother helped to support her and her children, including paying for some of the botanical specimens collected by them.

== Honours ==
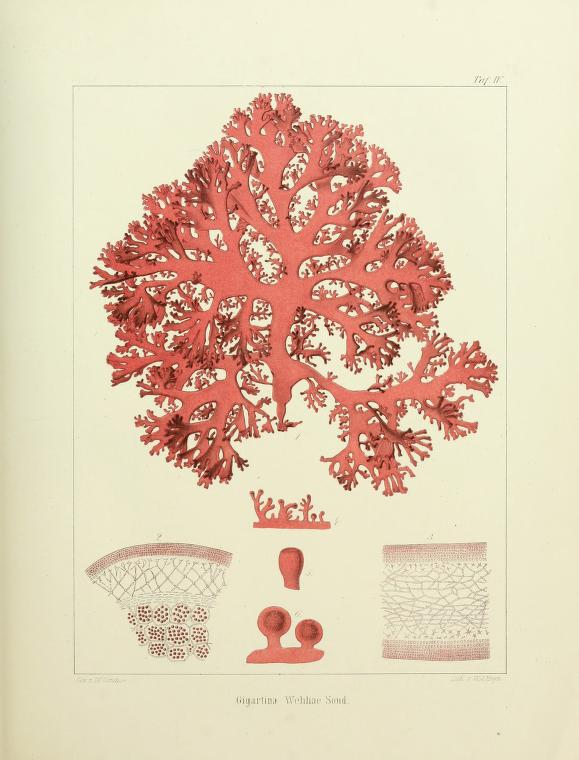
Illustration of Gigartina wehliae named in honour of Clara Wehl.

The genus Wehlia was named in honour of Wehl and her husband. The algae species Gigartina wehliae is also named in her honour.

== Death ==
Wehl died at Millicent on 31 July 1901 aged 68. She is buried at section A plot 25N at the Millicent Cemetery.
