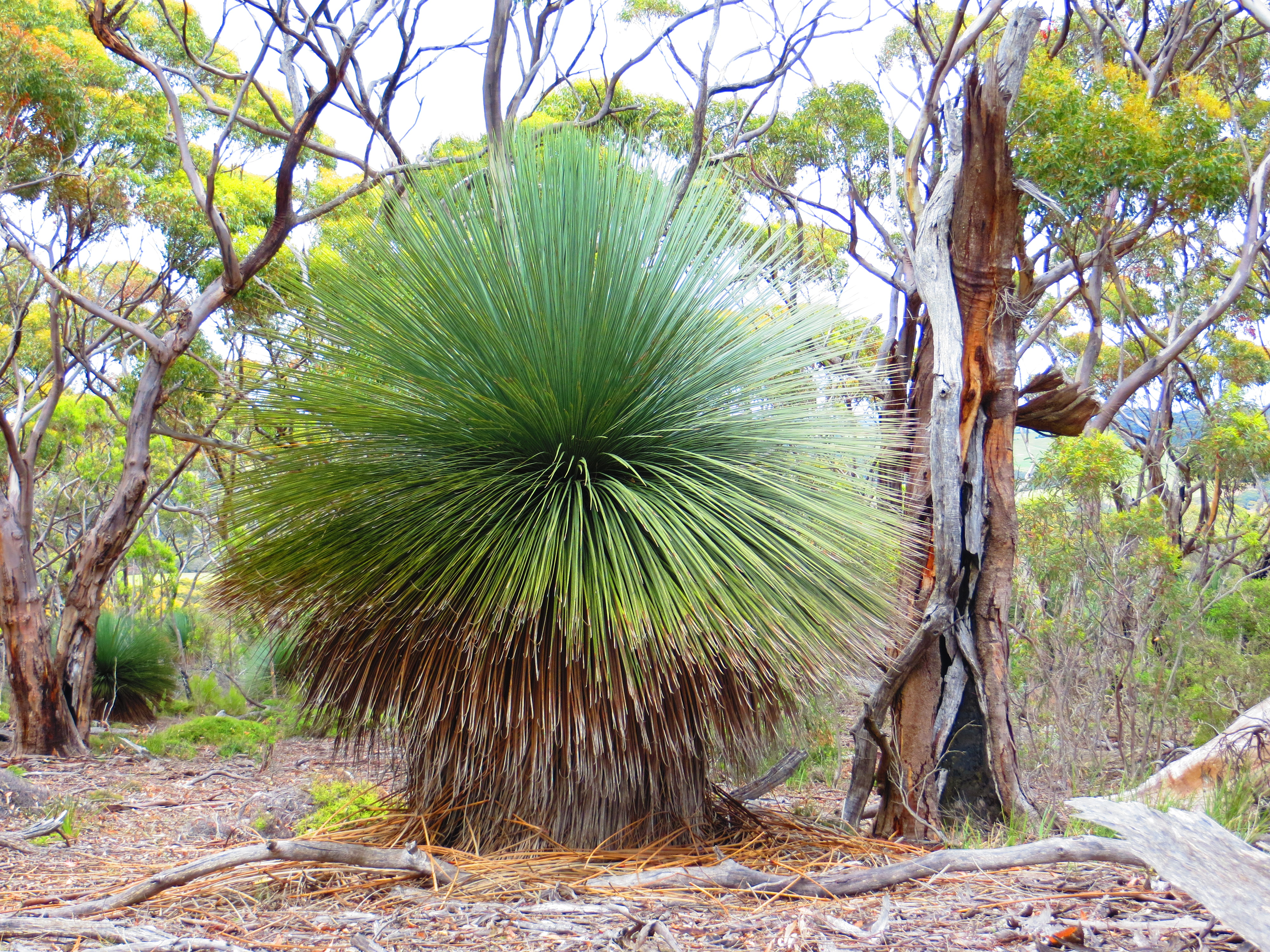
- Kangaroo Island grass tree ("Xanthorrhoea semiplana ssp. tateana"). Cape Cassini, Kangaroo Island, South Australia.

Conservation status
- Least Concern (IUCN 3.1)

Scientific classification
- Kingdom: Plantae
- Clade: Tracheophytes
- Clade: Angiosperms
- Clade: Monocots
- Order: Asparagales
- Family: Asphodelaceae
- Subfamily: Xanthorrhoeoideae
- Genus: Xanthorrhoea
- Species: X. semiplana

Binomial name
- Xanthorrhoea semiplana F.Muell., 1864

= Xanthorrhoea semiplana =

Species of plant

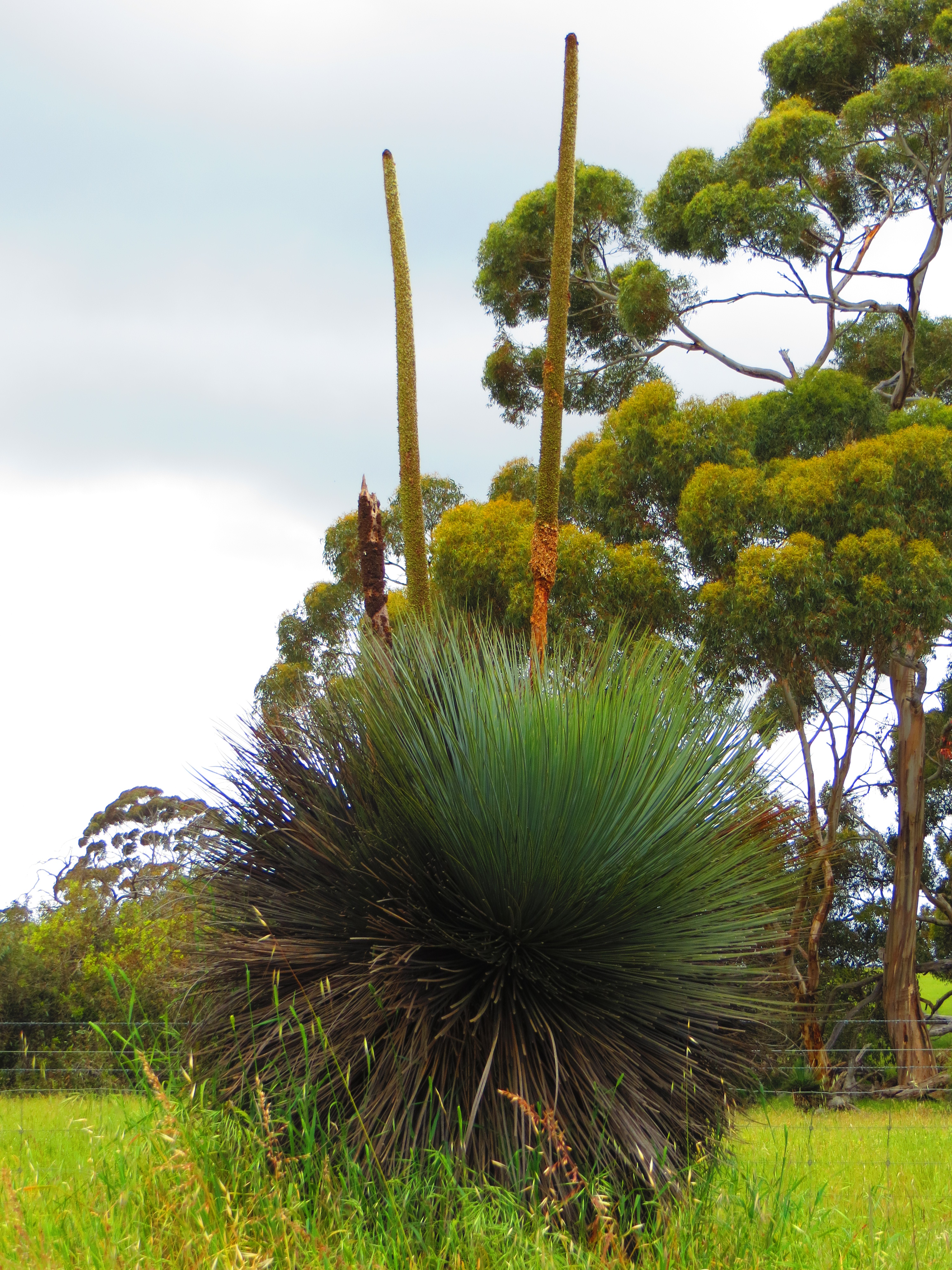
Kangaroo Island grass tree (Xanthorrhoea semiplana ssp. tateana). Stokes Bay, Kangaroo Island, South Australia.

Xanthorrhoea semiplana is a species of grass tree found in south-eastern Australia, with two subspecies:

Xanthorrhoea semiplana ssp. semiplana, the tufted grass tree, grows on the Eyre, Yorke and Fleurieu Peninsulas, southeastern South Australia and probably midwestern Victoria.

Xanthorrhoea semiplana ssp. tateana, the Kangaroo Island grass tree, Tate's grass tree or Yakka Bush, is lesser known.

== Description ==
Xanthorrhoea semiplana ssp. semiplana is typically smaller than Xanthorrhoea semiplana ssp. tateana. The former lacks a trunk and remains below 1 m in height, while the latter has a trunk and will often exceed a height of 1 m. Flowering occurs from Spring to Autumn, with plants capable of producing a flower spike several meters in length.

Can be distinguished from the co-occurring plant Xanthorrhoea quadrangulata by the cross section of the leaves: the cross section of X. semiplana is flat, while the cross section of X. quadrangulata is distinctly square in shape.

Like most species in the genus Xanthorrhoea, this plant is highly susceptible to infection by the pathogen Phytophthora cinnamomi.

== Ecology ==
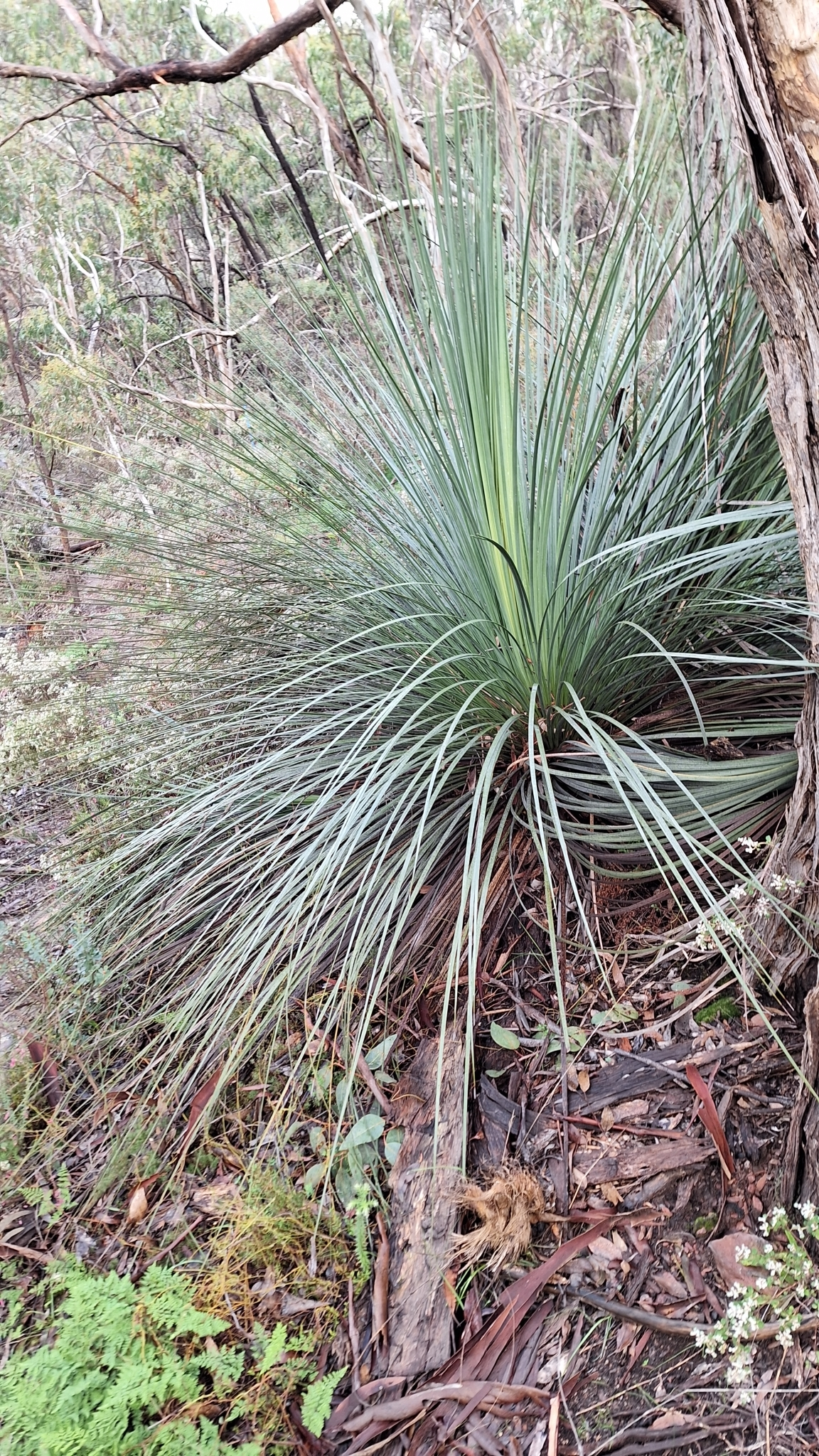
Xanthorrhoea semiplana ssp. semiplana, Mount Lofty Ranges, South Australia.

A large and prominent plant in the Australian landscape, Xanthorrhoea semiplana is a source of both food and shelter for numerous species. A study by the CSIRO found that these grass trees generate a distinct microclimate beneath their canopies, a discovery with significant implications for wildlife. This consistently stable environment moderates cold temperatures in winter and offers a crucial cool refuge for animals during summer heatwaves. Additionally, the study found that larger (and therefore older) grass trees provided the greatest protection from temperature and rain fluctuations.
