= Paul Christoph Hennings =

German mycologist and herbarium curator

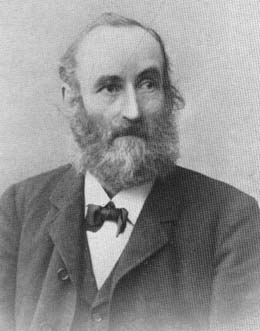
- Born: November 27, 1841; Heide, Duchy of Holstein
- Died: October 24, 1908 (aged 66); Berlin, Germany

Paul Christoph Hennings (November 27, 1841 – October 14, 1908) was a German mycologist and herbarium curator. He discovered the study of cryptogams and mushrooms as a volunteer at the botanical garden. Although circumstances initially prevented him to study in that area, he later returned to natural sciences and eventually rose to a position at the largest herbarium in Germany. Originally interested in all non-higher plants, he specialised into mushrooms and became particularly versed in tropical species sent from abroad.

== Biography ==
Borne in Heide, he was attracted early to plant sciences early and as a young man attracted the attention of director Ernst Ferdinand Nolte while a volunteer at the Botanischer Garten der Christian-Albrechts-Universität zu Kiel. After an interlude caused by the Second Schleswig War, and during which he worked in the postal services. This job, which he abhorred, forced to move a number of times until he could settle in 1867 in Hohenwestedt, where he remained until 1874. There he began lecturing at the Agricultural School (German: Landwirtschaftsschule). He also began issuing exsiccatae, e.g., the series Kryptogamen-Typen and Phykotheca Marchica. Sammlung getrockneter Algen aus der Mark Brandenburg, and seed collections until Nolte's successor, August W. Eichler, appointed him as an assistant. When Eichler went to work at the University of Berlin herbarium, he soon invited the younger man to join him. A complete autodidact, Hennings rose to become one of the foremost mycologists of his time, and particularly a specialist of tropical fungi thanks to the innumerable collections sent to Berlin from the German colonies and South America. He had two sons from his wife Mathilde, which he had married in 1876, but lost one to illness in 1907, which, in the words of his obituarist, "paralyzed his energies and stole the pen from [his] busy hand". He died within a year.

Hennings was one of the most prolific authors of new fungal species, having formally described 3429 in his career.

== See also ==
- Category:Taxa named by Paul Christoph Hennings
