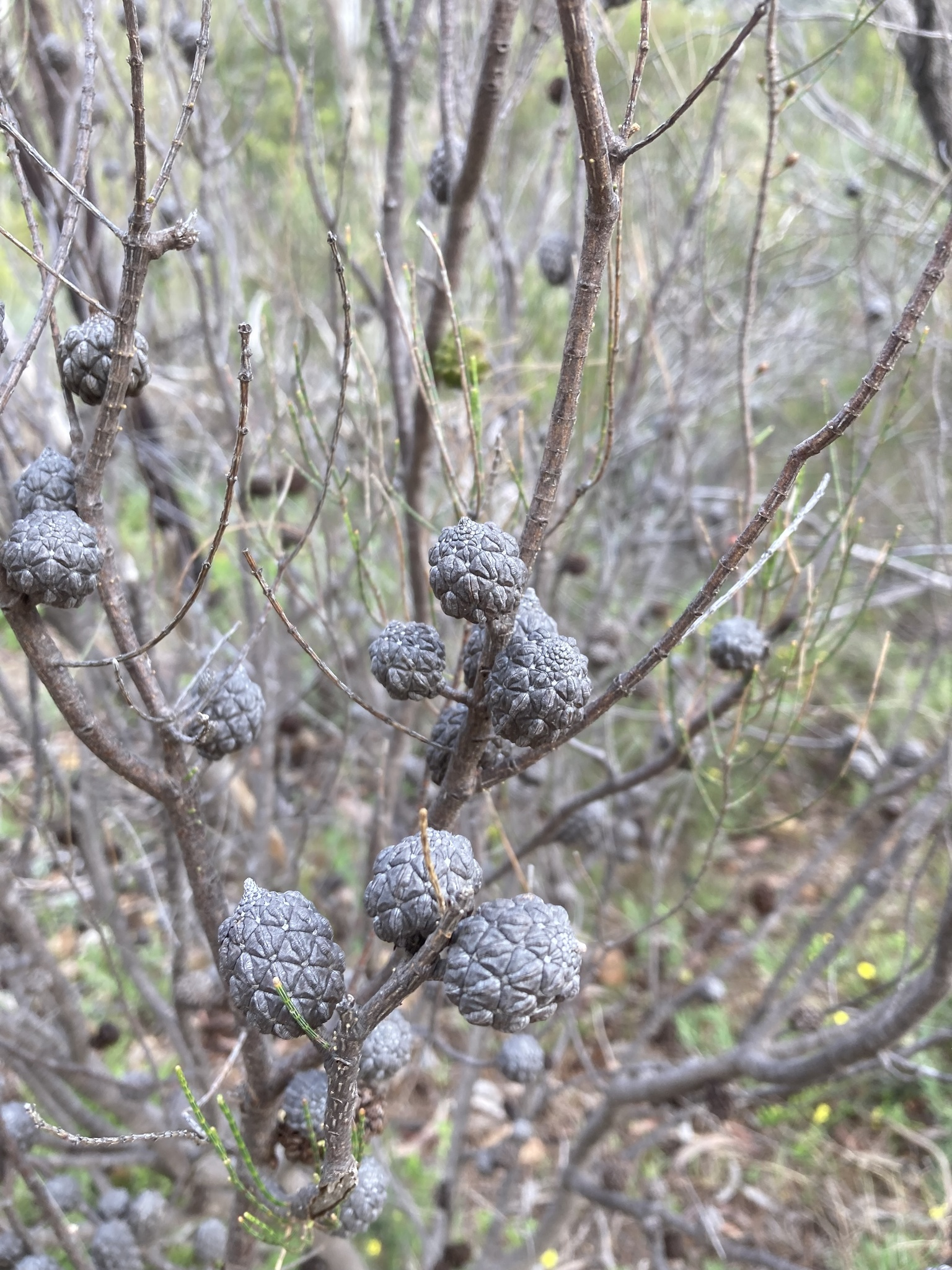
- In Anstey Hill Recreation Park

Scientific classification
- Kingdom: Plantae
- Clade: Tracheophytes
- Clade: Angiosperms
- Clade: Eudicots
- Clade: Rosids
- Order: Fagales
- Family: Casuarinaceae
- Genus: Allocasuarina
- Species: A. muelleriana

Binomial name
- Allocasuarina muelleriana (Miq.) L.A.S.Johnson
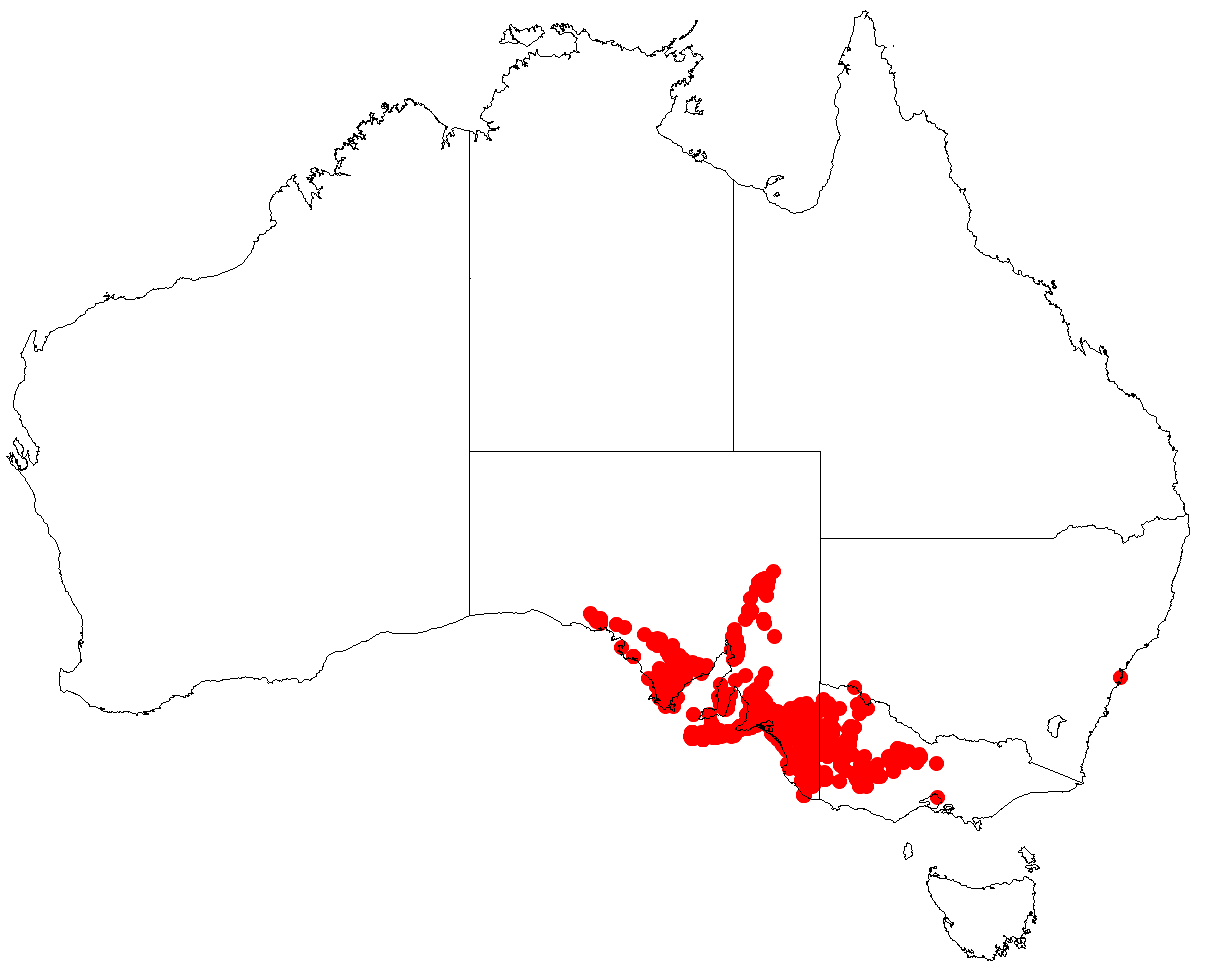
- Occurrence data from AVH

Synonyms
- Casuarina muelleriana Miq.; Casuarina suberosa var. muelleri Miq. orth. var.; Casuarina suberosa var. muelleriana (Miq.) Miq.

= Allocasuarina muelleriana =

Species of plant

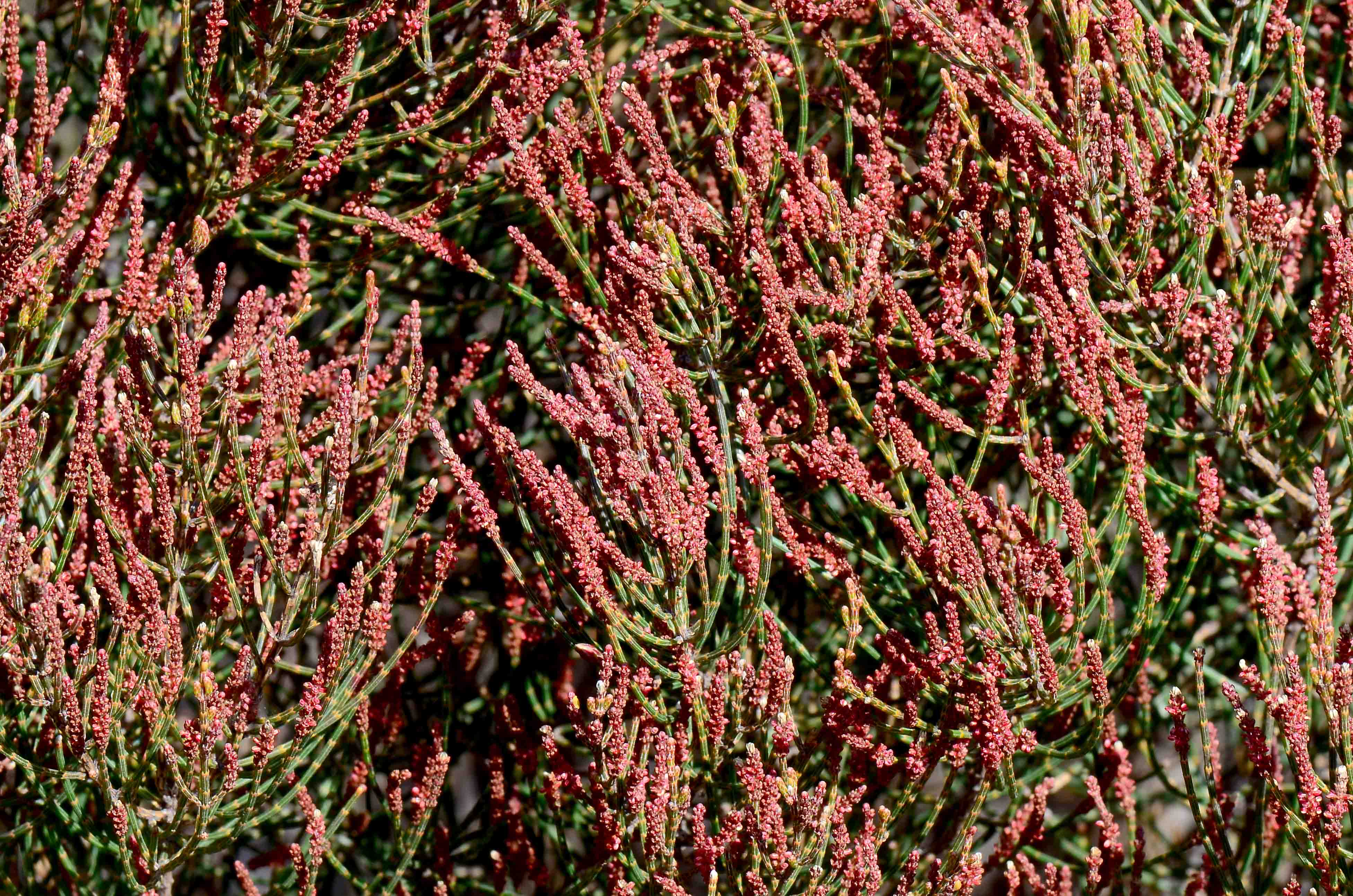
Male spikes of subsp. muelleriana

Allocasuarina muelleriana, commonly known as slaty sheoak, is a species of flowering plant in the family Casuarinaceae and is endemic to southern continental Australia. It is a dioecious, rarely a monoecious shrub that has branchlets up to 120 mm (4.7 in) long, the leaves reduced to scales in whorls of five to eight, the fruiting cones 14–30 mm (0.55–1.18 in) long containing winged seeds 6–9 mm (0.24–0.35 in) long.

== Description ==
Allocasuarina muelleriana is dioecious, rarely a monoecious shrub that typically grows to a height of 0.5–4 m (1 ft 8 in – 13 ft 1 in) high and has smooth bark. Its branchlets are more or less erect and up to 120 mm (4.7 in) long, the leaves reduced to scale-like teeth 0.3–0.6 mm (0.012–0.024 in) long, arranged in whorls of five to eight around the branchlets. The sections of branchlet between the leaf whorls are 3–11 mm (0.12–0.43 in) long, 0.6–1.1 mm (0.024–0.043 in) wide and are often waxy. Male flowers are arranged in spikes 10–40 mm (0.39–1.57 in) long and often appear like string of beads, the anthers 0.5–1.0 mm (0.020–0.039 in) long. Female cones are cylindrical, sessile or on a peduncle up to 16 mm (0.63 in) long. Mature cones are cylindrical 14–30 mm (0.55–1.18 in) long and 9–18 mm (0.35–0.71 in) in diameter, containing black, winged seeds 6–9 mm (0.24–0.35 in) long.

== Taxonomy ==
Slaty sheoak was first formally described in 1856 by Friedrich Anton Wilhelm Miquel who gave it the name Casuarina muelleriana in the journal, Nederlandsch Kruidkundig Archief from specimens collected in the Mount Lofty Ranges by Ferdinand von Mueller. In 1982, Johnson transferred the species to Allocasuarina as A. muelleriana in the Journal of the Adelaide Botanic Gardens.

Johnson described three subspecies of A. muelleriana in the Flora of Australia and the names are accepted by the Australian Plant Census:

- Allocasuarina muelleriana subsp. alticola L.A.S.Johnson has the sections of branchlet between the leaf whorls 5–7 mm (0.20–0.28 in) long and 0.7–1 mm (0.028–0.039 in) wide, the mature cones sessile or on a peduncle up to 3 mm (0.12 in) long.
- Allocasuarina muelleriana (Miq.)L.A.S.Johnson subsp. muelleriana L.A.S.Johnson has the sections of branchlet between the leaf whorls 3–8 mm (0.12–0.31 in) long and 0.6–0.8 mm (0.024–0.031 in) wide, the mature cones usually on a peduncle 1–8 mm (0.039–0.315 in) long.
- Allocasuarina muelleriana subsp. notocolpica L.A.S.Johnson has the sections of branchlet between the leaf whorls 5–11 mm (0.20–0.43 in) long and 0.9–1.1 mm (0.035–0.043 in) wide, the mature cones on a stout peduncle 8–17 mm (0.31–0.67 in) long.

== Distribution and habitat ==
Allocasuarina monilifera grows in heath and scrub. Subspecies muelleriana occurs from Ceduna and the Flinders Ranges, including Kangaroo Island in South Australia to Bendigo in Victoria. Subspecies alticola is found in the north-eastern part of the species' range from the Freeling Heights to Wilpena Pound and subsp. notocolpica is restricted to Kangaroo Island.
