= Ernst Ferdinand Nolte =

German botanist (1791–1875)

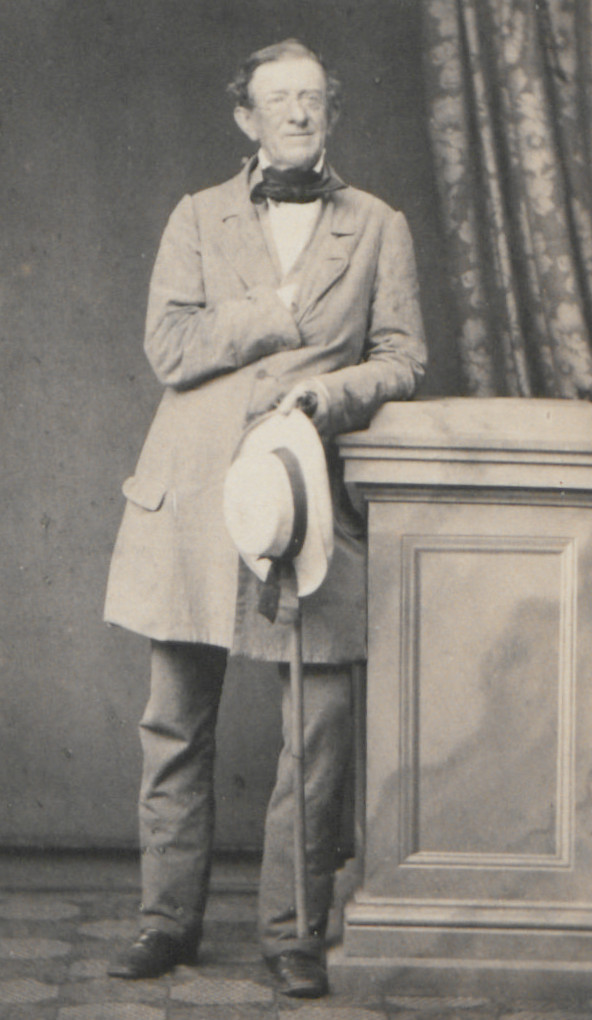
Portrait photo of Ernst Ferdinand Nolte

Ernst Ferdinand Nolte (24 December 1791, Hamburg – 18 February 1875, Kiel) was a German botanist. He was son-in-law to chemist Christoph Heinrich Pfaff (1773–1852).

After duties as a pharmacy apprentice in Goslar, he studied medicine at the University of Göttingen. While a student, he engaged in frequent botanical excursions throughout northern Germany. In 1817 he finished his studies at Göttingen, and later came under the influence of Danish botanist Jens Wilken Hornemann (1770–1841). From 1821 to 1823 he conducted botanical investigations in Lauenburg and the "Elbe Duchies", later taking scientific excursions to Zealand, Funen, Jutland and islands off both coasts of the Schleswig-Holstein mainland.

From 1826 to 1873 he was a professor of botany at the University of Kiel, as well as director of its botanical garden. He was an instructor to Ferdinand von Mueller (1825–1896), who would later be known for his botanical work in Australia. In the 1820s Nolte acquired the herbarium of Johannes Flüggé.

The plant genus Noltea from the family Rhamnaceae is named in his honor, as is Zostera noltei, a species of seagrass (named by Jens Wilken Hornemann, 1832).

== Written works ==
He made significant contributions to the botanical atlas Flora Danica, and was the author of the following publications:

- Botanische Bemerkungen über Stratiotes und Sagittaria, 1825
- Novitiæ floræ Holsaticæ : sive supplementum alterum Primitiarum floræ Holsaticæ G. H. Weberi, 1826
- Index seminum horti botanici Kiliensis, c. 1836–41.
