= Ferdinand von Mueller =

German-Australian botanist (1825–1896)

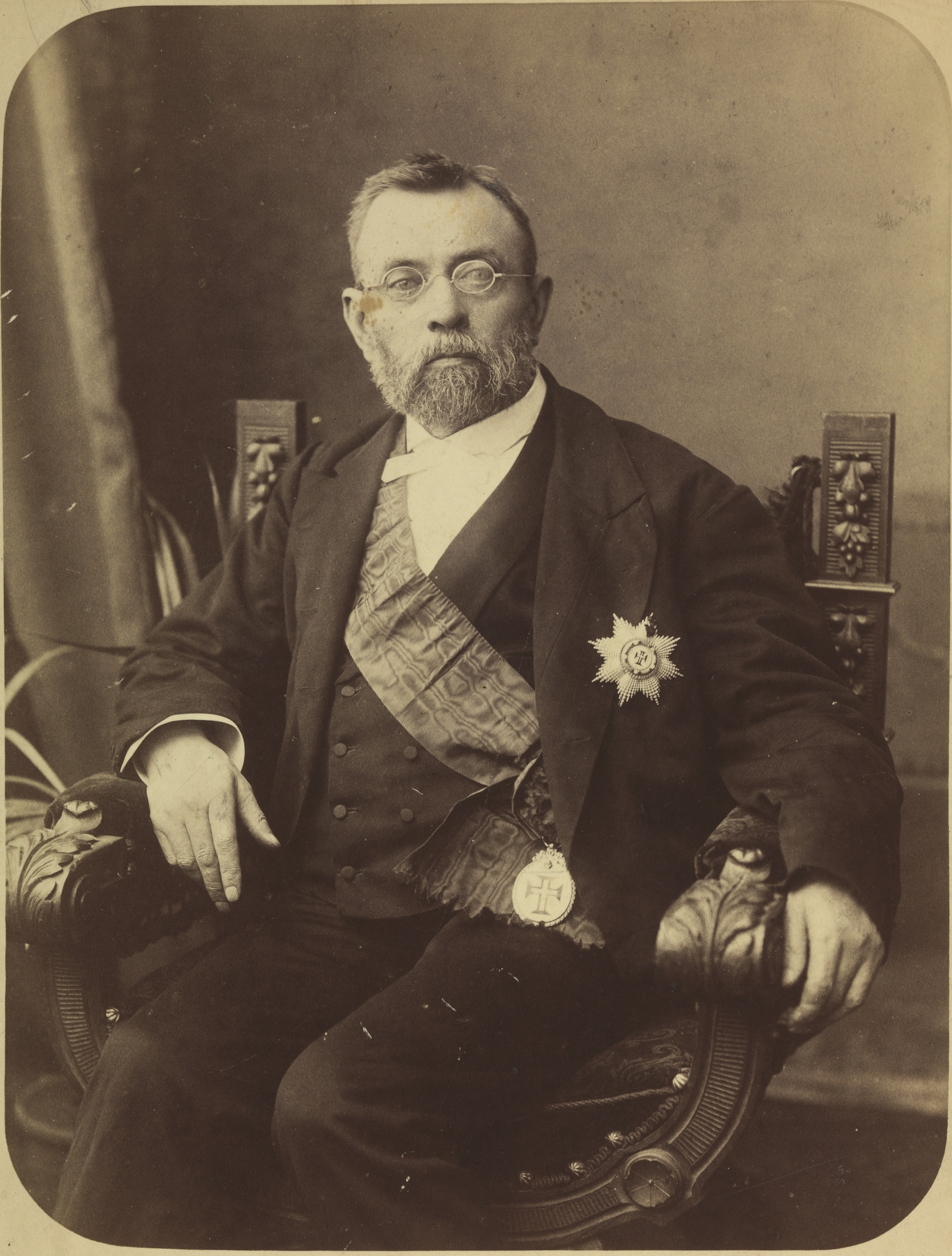
- Born: 30 June 1825; Rostock, Germany
- Died: 10 October 1896 (aged 71); Melbourne, Australia
- Citizenship: Naturalised British Subject in South Australia and Victoria
- Awards: Clarke Medal (1883); Royal Medal (1888)
- Scientific career
- Fields: botany, medicine, geography
- Author abbrev. (botany): F.Muell.

Baron Sir Ferdinand Jacob Heinrich von Mueller, KCMG (German: Müller; 30 June 1825 – 10 October 1896) was a German-Australian physician, geographer, and most notably, a botanist. He was appointed government botanist for the then colony of Victoria, Australia by Governor Charles La Trobe in 1853, and later director of the Royal Botanic Gardens in Melbourne. He also founded the National Herbarium of Victoria. He named many Australian plants.

== Early life ==
Mueller was born at Rostock, in the Grand Duchy of Mecklenburg-Schwerin. After the early death of his parents, Frederick and Louisa, his grandparents gave him a good education in Tönning, Schleswig. Apprenticed to a chemist at the age of 15, he passed his pharmaceutical examinations and studied botany under Professor Ernst Ferdinand Nolte (1791–1875) at Kiel University. In 1847, he received his degree of Doctor of Philosophy from Kiel for a thesis on the plants of the southern regions of Schleswig.

Mueller's sister Bertha had been advised to seek a warmer climate for her health, and the botanist Ludwig Preiss, who had recently returned from Perth, recommended Australia, so in 1847, Mueller, Bertha, and their other surviving sister, Clara, sailed from Bremen. While still on the ship, he reportedly fished his first plants out of the water to analyse them.

== Australia ==
Ferdinand von Mueller was one of a number of influential German-speaking residents — such as Ludwig Becker, Hermann Beckler, William Blandowski, Amalie Dietrich, Wilhelm Haacke, Diedrich Henne, Gerard Krefft, Johann Luehmann, Johann Menge, Carl Mücke (a.k.a. Muecke), Ludwig Preiss, Carl Ludwig Christian Rümker (a.k.a. Ruemker), Moritz Richard Schomburgk, Richard Wolfgang Semon, Karl Theodor Staiger, George Ulrich, Eugene von Guérard, Robert von Lendenfeld, Georg von Neumayer, and Carl Wilhelmi — who brought their "epistemic traditions" to Australia, and not only became "deeply entangled with the Australian colonial project", but also were "intricately involved in imagining, knowing and shaping colonial Australia" (Barrett, et al., 2018, p.2).

He arrived at Adelaide on 18 December 1847 and began working as a chemist with Moritz J. Heuzenroeder, in Rundle Street. He was an inveterate explorer, walking alone to Mount Arden and Mount Brown during his first year. Shortly afterwards, he obtained 20 acres (8.1 ha) of land not far from Adelaide in the Bugle Ranges, and had a cottage built there. He moved there with his sister Clara, intending to start a farm, but left shortly after.

Mueller thought to open a chemist's shop in the gold diggings, so in 1851, he moved to Melbourne, capital of the new colony of Victoria. In 1852, he sent a paper to the Linnean Society of London on "The Flora of South Australia", thus beginning to be well known in botanical circles.

== Victorian Government Botanist ==
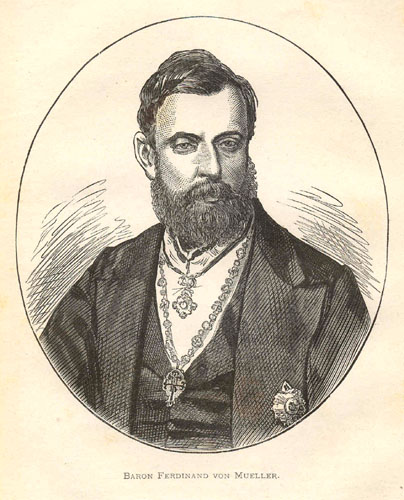

=== 1853 ===
Mueller was appointed government botanist for Victoria by Governor Charles La Trobe in 1853, a post that was newly created for him. He examined its flora, especially the Alpine vegetation of Australia, which was previously unknown. He explored the Buffalo Ranges.

In the same year, he established the National Herbarium of Victoria, which can still be visited today. It has many plants from Australia and abroad, many of which were collected by Mueller. Also, his large private library was transferred to the government of Victoria in 1865 and is incorporated into the library of the herbarium in Melbourne.

=== 1855–1856 ===
Mueller was then nominated as the botanist to accompany the North Australian Exploring Expedition (1855–1856) led by Augustus Gregory, and decided to join despite initial hesitations. He explored the Victoria River and other portions of North Australia, was one of the four who reached Termination Lake in 1856, and accompanied Gregory's expedition overland to Moreton Bay. Mueller found nearly 800 species in Australia new to science, such as Macadamia ternifolia (named after his friend and colleague, John Macadam). In 1856 he published Definitions of Rare or Hitherto Undescribed Australian Plants.

=== 1854–1872 ===
From 1854 to 1872, Mueller was a member of the Victorian Institute for the Advancement of Science, which later became the Philosophical Institute of Victoria. He was president of the Philosophical Institute in 1859 when it received a royal charter and became the Royal Society of Victoria. He was an active member of the society's "Exploration Committee" which established the Burke and Wills expedition of 1860. Mueller promoted the exploration of Australia, and as one of only two members of the Exploration Committee with any experience of exploration, he made several speeches to the society on the topic. He did not favour the selection of Burke as leader, but due to factionalism in the committee, he had little say in the establishment, provisioning, or composition of the exploration party.

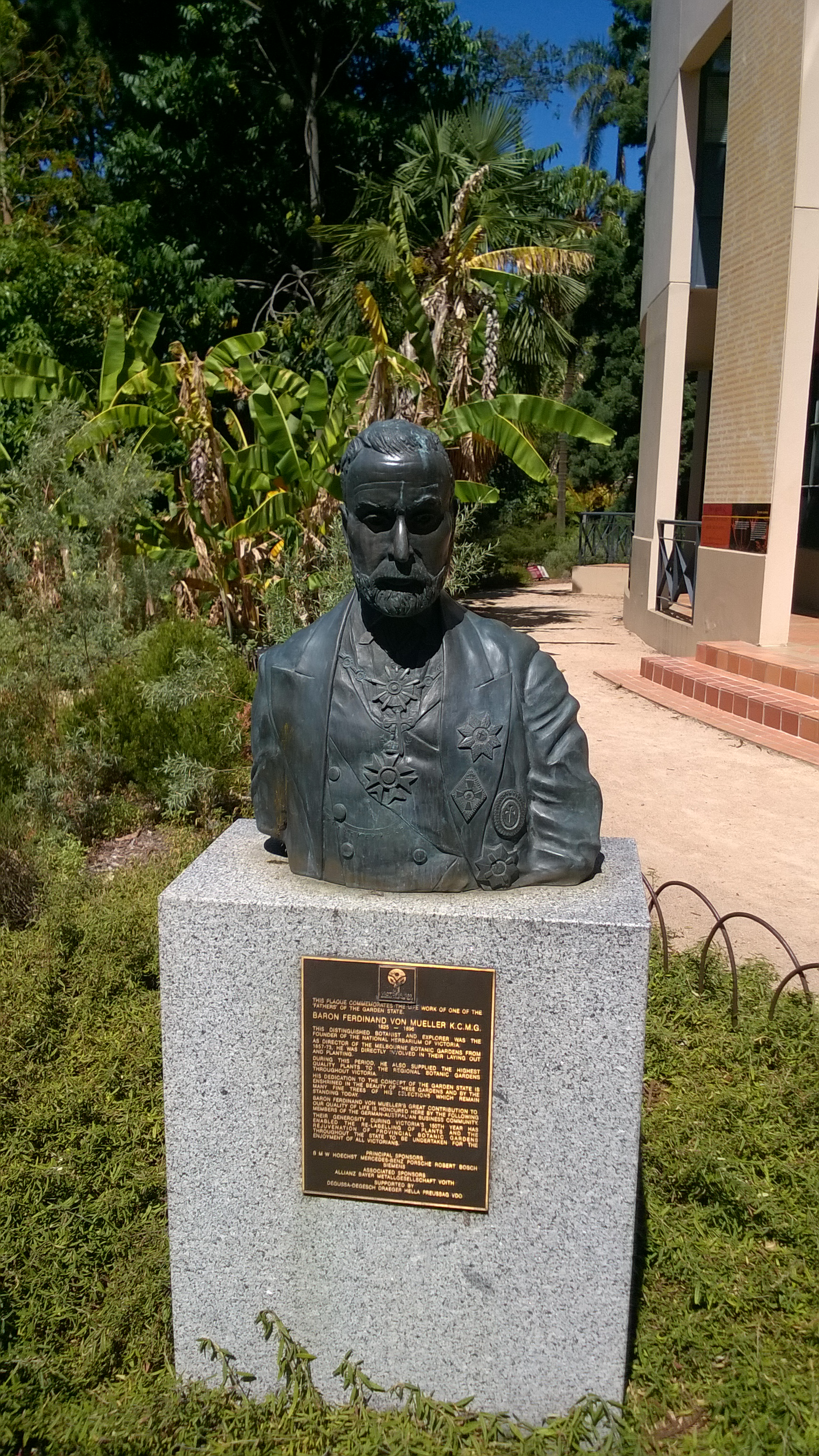
Bust of Mueller at the Royal Botanic Gardens, Melbourne

=== 1857–1873 ===
From 1857 to 1873, he was director of the Royal Botanic Gardens, Melbourne, and not only introduced many plants into Victoria, but also made the excellent qualities of the blue gum (Eucalyptus globulus) known all over the world, and succeeded in introducing it into the south of Europe, North and South Africa, California, and the extratropical portions of South America.

=== 1873 ===
By 1873, influential Melburnians were critical of Mueller's scientific and educational approach with the Royal Botanic Gardens. Development of the gardens with an eye to aesthetics was sought. Mueller was dismissed from his position as director of the Botanic Gardens on 31 May 1873. He had done much to develop the gardens with the scarce resources at hand. Though his pay was not affected and he still continued as the government botanist, he never lost his sense of grievance over losing the position.

In April 1873, Mueller had created the genus Guilfoylia and described William Guilfoyle as "distinguished as a collector [who] evidenced great ardour" and held high hopes for his collecting ability. Mueller's opinion changed when Guilfoyle was appointed to take his place as director of the Botanic Gardens in July 1873. He accused Guilfoyle of being a "nurseryman [with] no claims to scientific knowledge whatever" and of getting the job due to being related to the wife of the responsible minister. Mueller subsequently abolished Guilfoylia as part of the genus of Cadellia in his botanical census of 1882 (today the genus Guilfoylia is again accepted). Guilfoyle went on to landscape the gardens in an aesthetic and pleasing style welcomed by most Melburnians.

== Recognition ==
In 1857, Mueller applied for and was granted the degree of Doctor of Medicine of the University of Rostock; in 1883, he was awarded the Clarke Medal by the Royal Society of New South Wales.

Mueller was decorated by many foreign countries, including Germany, France, Spain, Denmark, and Portugal. He was appointed a fellow of the Royal Society in 1861, and knighted as Knight Commander of the Order of St Michael and St George in 1879. A list of his 'Orders, offices, affiliations and sundry honours' has been assembled. Many of his decorations were received in return for supplying zoological specimens to royal museums.

He was the benefactor of explorer Ernest Giles, who visited Lake Amadeus and Kata Tjuta. Giles had originally wanted to name these Lake Mueller and Mt Ferdinand, but Mueller prevailed upon Giles to name them Lake Amadeus, after King Amadeus of Spain, and Mt Olga, after Queen Olga of Württemberg; both kings had granted him honours. In 1871, King Karl of Württemberg gave him the hereditary title of Freiherr, to mark his distinction in 'natural sciences generally and in particular for the natural history collections and institutions of Our Kingdom' He was then known as Baron Sir Ferdinand von Mueller.

== Correspondence ==
Mueller's surviving inwards and outwards correspondence is being published on line.

== Publications ==
He published 11 volumes of Fragmenta phytographiae Australiae (1862–1881), two volumes of the Plants of Victoria (1860–1865), and other books on the Eucalyptus, Myoporaceae, Acacia, and Salsolaceae, all profusely illustrated. He also co-operated in the production of George Bentham's Flora Australiensis. He described many novel plant species sent by botanists from other parts of Australia, notably Maurice William Holtze from the Northern Territory, and encouraged settlers to send plants to him.

Mueller published an educational exsiccata with the title Educational collections of Australian plants (1873–1876) and was able to distribute three fascicles in about 50 institutions.

A list of his known publications is available

Women were key contributors to his collections. Two hundred and twenty-five women and girls, the youngest of which was six years of age, collected plant specimens and mailed them to Mueller for cataloging. These women included Louisa Atkinson, Sarah Brooks, and Flora Mary Campbell.

He took a leading part in promoting Australian exploration, especially the Burke and Wills expedition, which was the first to cross the continent, and in the various attempts to unravel the mystery which attended the fate of his fellow countryman Ludwig Leichhardt (1813–1848).

== Death ==
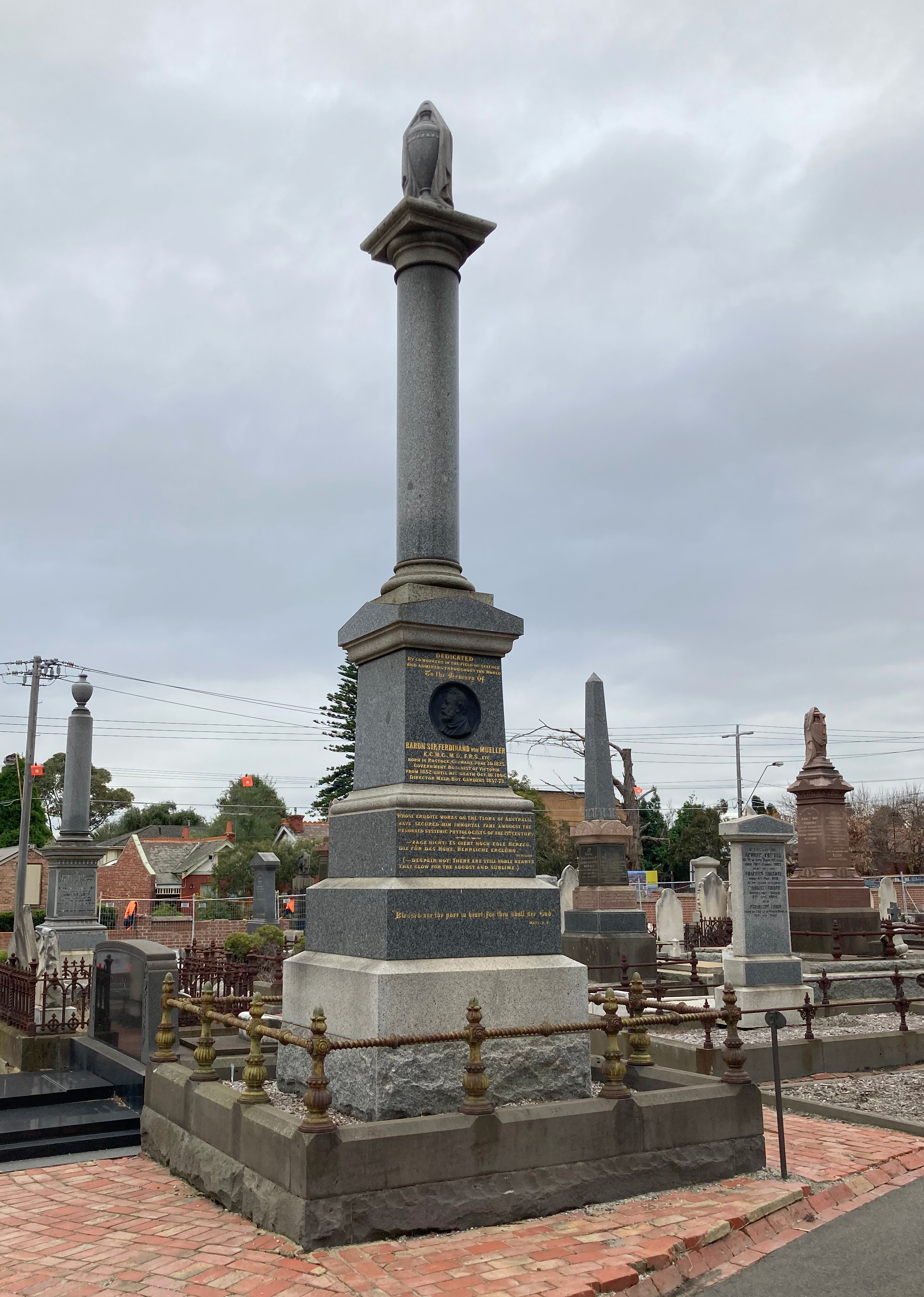
Mueller's grave at St Kilda Cemetery

Mueller died in Melbourne and is buried in the St Kilda Cemetery. He was survived by his sister, Mrs. Clara Wehl, of Millicent, South Australia. His other sister, Mrs. Bertha Doughty of near Penola predeceased him. He never married.

== Darwinism ==
Mueller was a theist who rejected Darwinism, especially speciation. He misunderstood some elements of Charles Darwin's theory, but evidently came to see that natural selection operating within a species explained adaptation to different habitats within which it grew. Despite his differences he remained on friendly terms with Darwin.

== Legacy ==
The Mueller Medal has been awarded since 1904 by the Australian and New Zealand Association for the Advancement of Science to "a scientist who is the author of important contributions to anthropological, botanical, geological or zoological science, preferably with special reference to Australia".

A Victorian Railways S Class diesel-electric locomotive, S311, is named after Mueller.

=== Places named after Mueller ===
A number of geographical features were named after Mueller: the Mueller Ranges (Western Australia), Muellers Range (Queensland), Mount Mueller (in WA, Northern Territory, Tasmania and Victoria) and Mount von Mueller (WA), Muellers Peak (New South Wales), the Mueller River (NZ), Muellers Creek (South Australia) and Mueller Creek (NT) also Von Mueller Creek (Vic), Lake Mueller (Qld), and Mueller hut near the Mueller Glacier in New Zealand. Mueller Park, Subiaco (WA) is also named after him.

=== Artworks based on Mueller ===
- Love, Death, Music and Plants, a music theatre work based on scenes from the life of Mueller, was written by Brian Lipson (writer) and Matthew Hindson (composer), and had a two-week season at the Mueller Hall, National Herbarium of Victoria, 18–30 November 2003.
- A bust of Mueller by Marc Clark is located outside the National Herbarium of Victoria.

=== Plants named after Mueller ===
Species named to honour Mueller typically end in , or . Examples include the genus, Muellerina (Loranthaceae), the taxa Callitris muelleri, Persoonia muelleri, and Verticordia muelleriana, Allocasuarina muelleriana and Eucalyptus muelleriana, and Terminalia ferdinandiana. Over 26,000 specimens collected by Mueller are held by the National Herbarium of Victoria.

=== Animals named after Mueller ===
A species of Australian lizard, Lerista muelleri, is named in his honour, as well as a number of fish and invertebrates.

=== Journals named after Mueller ===
The in-house journal, Muelleria, of the National Herbarium of Victoria is dedicated to Mueller.

== See also ==
- List of Australian plant species authored by Ferdinand von Mueller
- Systematic Census of Australian Plants
- Burke and Wills expedition
- Cape Leeuwin Wattle
- Tietkens expedition of 1889
- Category:Taxa named by Ferdinand von Mueller

== Bibliography ==
1. Chisholm, A. H., Ferdinand von Mueller, Great Australians, Oxford University Press, Melbourne, 1962
2. Home, R.W. (ed), Australian Science in the Making: A Bicentennial History (1990) ISBN 0-521-39640-9
3. Home, R.W. et al. (eds) Regardfully yours: selected correspondence of Ferdinand von Mueller.3 vols Peter Lang, Berne. 1998–2006
4. Kynaston, Edward, A Man on Edge: A life of Baron Sir Ferdinand von Mueller, Allen Lane, London; Ringwood, 1981
5. Mueller, Dr Ferdinand von, 1858. An historical review of the explorations of Australia. Melbourne: Philosophical Institute.
6. Mueller, Dr Ferdinand von, 1863. "Enumeration of the plants collected by Dr J Murray during Mr A Howitt's Expedition into Central Australia in the year 1862". Annual Report of the Government Botanist, pp. 16–18.
7. Mueller, Dr Ferdinand von, 1865. "On the systematic position of the Nardoo plant and the physiological characteristics of its fruit". Transactions and proceedings of the Royal Society of Victoria: During the years 1861 to 1864, pp 137–147.
8. Voigt, Johannes H., Die Erforschung Australiens: Der Briefwechsel zwischen August Petermann and Ferdinand von Mueller 1861–1878, Justus Perthes Verlag, Gotha, 1996

== Additional publications online ==
- Index perfectus ad Caroli Linnaei : species plantarum / collatore Ferdinando de Mueller. (1880)
- Eucalyptographia. A descriptive atlas of the eucalypts of Australia and the adjoining islands (1879–1884)
- Iconography of Australian species of Acacia and cognate genera (1887)
- Select extra-tropical plants readily eligible for industrial culture or naturalisation (1891)
- Introduction to botanic teachings at the schools of Victoria (1877)
- The organic constituents of plants and vegetable substances and their chemical analysis (1878)
- Manuel de l'acclimateur (1887)
- Fragmenta phytographiæ Australiæ /contulit Ferdinandus Mueller (1858–1882)
- The plants indigenous to the colony of Victoria, Volume 1 (1860–1862)
- Key to the system of Victorian plants (1887/88)
- The Vegetation of the Chatham Islands (1864)
- Iconography of Salsolaceous plants (1889) R.S. Brain Government Printer, Melbourne.
