= List of shipwrecks in August 1859 =

The list of shipwrecks in August 1859 includes ships sunk, foundered, wrecked, grounded, or otherwise lost during August 1859.

== 1 August ==
List of shipwrecks: 1 August 1859
| Ship | State | Description |
|---|---|---|
| Chinsura | United Kingdom | The ship was wrecked on the Gaspar Sand, off the coast of India; crew were saved. |
| De Ruyter | Netherlands | The barque was wrecked on the Goodwin Sands, Kent, United Kingdom with the loss of all hands. She was on a voyage from Buenos Aires, Argentina to Antwerp, Belgium. |
| Ebenezer | (United Kingdom of Great Britain and Ireland) New South Wales | Four died when Ebenezer hit the Tweed River bar, New South Wales, Australia, while en route from Sydney, New South Wales, to Tweed River. |
| Langgarten | Prussia | The ship was driven ashore and wrecked at Bahia, Brazil. |
| Margaret Sophia | United Kingdom | The ship sank off Heligoland. Her crew were rescued. She was on a voyage from Middlesbrough, Yorkshire to Harburg. |
| Maria Reifina | Russia | The ship was driven on Naissaar. She was on a voyage from Saint Petersburg to Leith, Lothian, United Kingdom. She had become a wreck by 9 August. |
| Mary Rogers | United Kingdom | The schooner caught fire due to her cargo of quicklime getting wet. She put in to Fraserburgh, Aberdeenshire. She was on a voyage from Sunderland, County Durham to Wick, Caithness. |
| Middleton | United Kingdom | The ship foundered in the Atlantic Ocean. All on board were rescued. She was on a voyage from Liverpool, Lancashire to Saint John, New Brunswick, British North America. |
| Neptune | United Kingdom | The troopship was wrecked in the Myoor River. All on board were rescued by the steamship Nemesis (United Kingdom). Neptune was on a voyage from Calcutta, India to Akyab, Burma |
| Patriot | United Kingdom | The schooner ran aground on the Kentish Knock. She was on a voyage from Newcastle upon Tyne, Northumberland to Saint-Valery-sur-Somme, Somme, France. She was refloated and beached that day at Easton Bavents, Suffolk, where she became a wreck. |
| Ripley | (United Kingdom of Great Britain and Ireland) New South Wales | The ship was wrecked at the mouth of the Richmond River. |
| Victory | United Kingdom | The ship capsized and sank in the River Trent at Morton, Lincolnshire with the loss of two of the eight people on board. She was on a voyage from Hull, Yorkshire to Lincoln. |

== 2 August ==
List of shipwrecks: 2 August 1859
| Ship | State | Description |
|---|---|---|
| Bullfinch | United Kingdom | The ship sprang a leak in the North Sea. Two crew from Ann Emma (United Kingdom) were put aboard to assist with pumping but this proved ineffectual. All on board were rescued by Ann Emma before she foundered. Bullfinch was on a voyage from the River Tyne to Hamburg. |
| Potomac | United States | The ship ran aground on the Moselle Shoals. She was on a voyage from Liverpool, Lancashire, United Kingdom to New Orleans, Louisiana. |

== 3 August ==
List of shipwrecks: 3 August 1859
| Ship | State | Description |
|---|---|---|
| Clymene | United Kingdom | The ship ran aground on the Kish Bank, in the Irish Sea. She was on a voyage from Liverpool, Lancashire to Calcutta, India. She consequently put in to Kingstown, County Dublin in a leaky condition. |
| Cromwell | United Kingdom | The ship was driven ashore in the Hooghly River upstream of "Rhallafally", India. She was on a voyage from Singapore, Straits Settlements to Calcutta. She was later refloated and completed her voyage. |

== 4 August ==
List of shipwrecks: 4 August 1859
| Ship | State | Description |
|---|---|---|
| Fortuna | Norway | The ship was driven ashore and severely damaged on Flotta, Orkney Islands, United Kingdom. She was on a voyage from Arendal to the Isle of Man. Fortuna was later refloated and taken in to Longhope, Orkney Islands. |
| Panic | United Kingdom | The ship was driven ashore in the Yangon River. |
| Saragossa | United States | The ship was destroyed by fire at New Orleans, Louisiana. She was on a voyage from New Orleans to Philadelphia, Pennsylvania. |

== 5 August ==
List of shipwrecks: 5 August 1859
| Ship | State | Description |
|---|---|---|
| Ocean | Sweden | The ship ran ashore on "Solos Island", at the mouth of the River Plate. She floated off and sank. She was on a voyage from the Clyde to the River Plate. |
| Pallas | (United Kingdom of Great Britain and Ireland) Jersey | The ship was driven ashore and wrecked on Miquelon. She was on a voyage from Newfoundland to covk. |
| 226 | Russia | The lighter was destroyed by fire at Saint Petersburg. |

== 6 August ==
List of shipwrecks: 6 August 1859
| Ship | State | Description |
|---|---|---|
| Admella | (United Kingdom of Great Britain and Ireland) New South Wales | Painting The Admella wrecked, Cape Banks, 6th August, 1859 by James Shaw, 1859. The passenger ship hit Carpenters Reef, about 20 miles (32 km) off Cape Northumberland, South Australia, while bound for Melbourne, Victoria, from Adelaide, South Australia. Differing accounts claim that either 83 or 89 people lost their lives. |
| Equateur | France | Carrying coal from Sydney, New South Wales, to Calcutta, India, the barque was attacked by the local inhabitants and abandoned in the Torres Strait off Murray Island. Her crew were rescued. |
| Sovereign of the Seas | United States | The clipper was wrecked on the Pyramid Shoal, in the Strait of Malacca. All on board survived. She was on a voyage from Bombay, India to a port in China. |

== 7 August ==
List of shipwrecks: 7 August 1859
| Ship | State | Description |
|---|---|---|
| Andre Celeste | France | The ship caught fire and was abandoned 80 leagues (240 nautical miles (440 km)) off Bermuda. Her crew were rescued by Zelie (France). Andre Celeste was on a voyage from Martinique to Havre de Grâce, Seine-Inférieure. |
| Burton | United Kingdom | The ship ran aground on the Newcombe Sand, in the North Sea off the coast of Suffolk. She was on a voyage from Seaham, County Durham to London. She was refloated and taken in to Lowestoft, Suffolk in a leaky condition. |
| Nantucket | United States | Painting of the wreck of Nantucket by William Bradford, ca. 1860-1861. The whaler was wrecked off the Island of Nashawena, Massachusetts. |
| Robert Gardner | United Kingdom | The schooner was run down and sunk in the English Channel 15 nautical miles (28 km) south south west of South Foreland, Kent by Ondine (United Kingdom) with the loss of four of the nine people on board. She was on a voyage from Hartlepool, County Durham to Dover, Kent. |

== 8 August ==
List of shipwrecks: 8 August 1859
| Ship | State | Description |
|---|---|---|
| Earl Grey | United Kingdom | The ship was wrecked at Llandudno, Caernarfonshire. Her crew were rescued. She was on a voyage from Dumfries to Bangor, Caernarfonshire. |

== 9 August ==
List of shipwrecks: 9 August 1859
| Ship | State | Description |
|---|---|---|
| Bedlington | United Kingdom | The schooner ran aground on the Andrews Sand, in the North Sea off the coast of Suffolk. She was on a voyage from South Shields, County Durham to Ipswich, Suffolk. She became a wreck the next day. Her crew were rescued. |

== 10 August ==
List of shipwrecks: 10 August 1859
| Ship | State | Description |
|---|---|---|
| Bruce | United Kingdom | The brig sprang a leak and foundered. Her crew were rescued. She was on a voyage from Garrucha, Spain to North Shields, County Durham. |
| Canton | United Kingdom | The schooner foundered in the English Channel off Bognor, Sussex. Her crew were rescued. She was on a voyage from London to Cherbourg, Manche, France. |
| Laurie | France | The brigantine collided with the brigantine Eleanor Alice (United Kingdom) and foundered off the Longships Lighthouse. |
| Victory | United Kingdom | The brig sprang a leak and foundered in the English Channel 12 nautical miles (22 km) east south east of South Foreland, Kent. Her crew were rescued by a Norwegian barque. Victory was on a voyage from Sunderland, County Durham to Dunkirk, Nord, France. |

== 11 August ==
List of shipwrecks: 11 August 1859
| Ship | State | Description |
|---|---|---|
| Harlequin | United Kingdom | The ship was driven ashore and wrecked at Port St. Mary, Isle of Man. She was on a voyage from Liverpool, Lancashire to Montreal, Province of Canada, British North America. She was refloated on 1 September and taken in to Port St. Mary. |
| Hinda | United Kingdom | The brigantine ran aground on the Sand Reef, in the North Sea, broke in two and was wrecked. She was on a voyage from Sunderland, County Durham to Glückstadt, Duchy of Schleswig. |
| Hoop | Netherlands | The ship was reported to have been driven ashore near Taganrog, Russia whilst on a voyage from the Grand Duchy of Oldenburg to Delfzijl, Groningen. Her crew were rescued. |
| Kate Howard | United States | The steamboat sank in the Missouri River downstream of Jefferson City, Missouri. All on board, more than 150 people, survived. |
| Kitty | United Kingdom | The barque was crushed by ice and sunk in the Hudson Strait off Cape Resolution. She was on a voyage from Newcastle upon Tyne, Northumberland to Hudson's Bay. There were ultimately five survivors of her sixteen crew. |
| Pickwick | United Kingdom | The ship was wrecked on the Quintiro Shoals, in the Pacific Ocean with the loss of a crew member. She was on a voyage from Swansea, Glamorgan to Valparaíso, Chile. |

== 12 August ==
List of shipwrecks: 12 August 1859
| Ship | State | Description |
|---|---|---|
| Maddalina | Kingdom of Sardinia | The ship ran aground on the Riggs of Groomsport. She was on a voyage from Brăila, Ottoman Empire to Belfast, County Antrim, United Kingdom. She was refloated and towed in to Belfast. |
| Prince Patrick | United Kingdom | The steamship ran aground in the Copeland Islands, County Down. She was on a voyage from Belfast to Fleetwood, Lancashire. She was refloated with the assistance of the steamships Albion and Wonder (both United Kingdom) and put back to Belfast in a leaky condition. |
| Trackliss | United Kingdom | The yacht foundered off Caldey Island, Pembrokeshire. Her crew were rescued by a schooner. |

== 13 August ==
List of shipwrecks: 13 August 1859
| Ship | State | Description |
|---|---|---|
| Elizabeth | United Kingdom | The brig was driven ashore on the Ness of Queys, in the Pentland Firth. She was on a voyage from South Shields, County Durham to Quebec City, Province of Canada, British North America. She was refloated and resumed her voyage. |
| Iris | (United Kingdom of Great Britain and Ireland) Guernsey | The schooner ran aground on the Holm Sand, in the North Sea off the coast of Suffolk. She was on a voyage from Newcastle upon Tyne, Northumberland to Guernsey. She was refloated the next day and taken in to Lowestoft, Suffolk. |
| Isabella and Sarah | United Kingdom | The ship sprang a leak and was beached at Jarrow, County Durham. She was on a voyage from Jarrow to Rochester, Kent. |
| Lebanon | United Kingdom | The brig was severely damaged by an explosion of coal gas at Sunderland, County Durham. |

== 14 August ==
List of shipwrecks: 14 August 1859
| Ship | State | Description |
|---|---|---|
| Iris | (United Kingdom of Great Britain and Ireland) Guernsey | The schooner ran aground on the Holme Sand, in the North Sea off the coast of Suffolk. She was on a voyage from Newcastle upon Tyne, Northumberland to Guernsey. |
| Jessica | United Kingdom | The ship departed from London for Bombay, India. She subsequently sprang a leak and was abandoned in the Atlantic Ocean (10°00′S 25°39′W) before she sank. Thee captain and thirteen crew took to a longboat, while the Mate and seven crew took to a pinnace, after which the ship sank. The longboat arrived at Pernambuco, Brazil after five days. The fate of the hands on the pinnace was not known. |
| Thetis | United Kingdom | The brig was abandoned in the Atlantic Ocean. Her crew were rescued by Battus (United Kingdom). Thetis was on a voyage from South Shields, County Durham to Quebec City, Province of Canada, British North America. |

== 15 August ==
List of shipwrecks: 15 August 1859
| Ship | State | Description |
|---|---|---|
| Glendaragh | (United Kingdom of Great Britain and Ireland) Straits Settlements | The ship was dismasted in the South China Sea (20°05′N 114°40′E). She was abandoned three days later; all on board were rescued. She was on a voyage from Singapore to Hong Kong. |
| Melbourne | (United Kingdom of Great Britain and Ireland) Victoria | The brig was wrecked in the Kent Group, Tasmania. Her crew were rescued. |
| Ocean Bride | United Kingdom | The ship was driven ashore on Typha Island, China. She was refloated the next day. |
| 333 | Russia | The lighter was destroyed by fire at Saint Petersburg. |

== 16 August ==
List of shipwrecks: 16 August 1859
| Ship | State | Description |
|---|---|---|
| Ilos | Norway | The barque ran aground on the Goodwin Sands, Kent, United Kingdom. She was on a voyage from Newport, Monmouthshire, United Kingdom to Helsinki, Grand Duchy of Finland. |

== 17 August ==
List of shipwrecks: 17 August 1859
| Ship | State | Description |
|---|---|---|
| Aigrette | French Navy | The Alarme-class gunboat suffered a boiler explosion and sank in the Adriatic Sea 2 nautical miles (3.7 km) southwest of Antivari, Principality of Montenegro with some loss of life. Survivors were rescued by Isly and Monge (both French Navy). |
| Black Douglas | United Kingdom | The ship was abandoned in a sinking condition. Her crew were rescued. She was on a voyage from "Kooria Mooria" (Khuriya Muriya Islands) to Queenstown, County Cork. |
| City of Calcutta | United Kingdom | The brig was wrecked on the George and Mary Shoal, in the Hooghly River with the loss of four lives. She was on a voyage from Calcutta, India to the Clyde |
| Henrietta | United Kingdom | The brig ran aground between the Nore and the Grain Spit She was on a voyage from Newcastle upon Tyne, Northumberland to London. She was refloated and taken in to Sheerness, Kent in a waterlogged condition. |
| Philomela | Sweden | The ship was wrecked at "Wangsaal", near Thisted, Denmark.. Her crew were rescued. She was on a voyage from Gothenburg to London, United Kingdom. |
| Victory | United Kingdom | The brig struck a floating object and foundered off the Kent coast She was on a voyage from Sunderland, County Durham to Dunkirk, Nord, France. |

== 18 August ==
List of shipwrecks: 18 August 1859
| Ship | State | Description |
|---|---|---|
| Alca | United Kingdom | The schooner struck rocks and was wrecked off Jersey, Channel Islands. Her six crew survived. She was on a voyage from Alderney to Jersey. |
| Herald | United Kingdom | The ship ran aground and sank in the River Tyne. She was on a voyage from the River Tyne to Cartagena, Spain. |
| Unity | United Kingdom | The ship ran aground on the Barber Sand, in the North Sea off the coast of Norfolk. She was refloated. |

== 19 August ==
List of shipwrecks: 19 August 1859
| Ship | State | Description |
|---|---|---|
| Eliza | United Kingdom | The brig ran aground at Port Hood, Nova Scotia, British North America. She was on a voyage from Prince Edward Island, British North America to Liverpool, Lancashire. She was refloated the next day. |
| Emily | United Kingdom | The brig ran aground on the Barber Sand, in the North Sea off the coast of Norfolk. She was refloated. |
| Oporto | United Kingdom | The brig was driven onto the Bondicar Rocks, on the coast of Northumberland. She was on a voyage from Hamburg to Newcastle upon Tyne. She was refloated and resumed her voyage. |

== 20 August ==
List of shipwrecks: 20 August 1859
| Ship | State | Description |
|---|---|---|
| Commodore | United Kingdom | The full-rigged ship caught fire at Boston, Massachusetts, United States and was scuttled. She was refloated the next day. |
| Henbury | United Kingdom | The ship was destroyed by fire at Port Chalmers, New Zealand, where it had arrived from Gravesend, Kent. All crew and passengers were saved, but the cargo was completely lost. According to sources at the time, the ship's captain had travelled from Port Chalmers to Dunedin after the ship was docked along with several passengers, and in his absence the crew obtained grog and became rowdy, leading to the fire. |
| Northam | United Kingdom | The steamship ran aground on the Nautilus Reef or the Shab-barger Reef, in the Red Sea off Jeddah, Hejaz Vilayet (20°54′N 37°25′E). All on board survived. She was on a voyage from Aden to Suez, Egypt. She was later refloated and temporary repairs made before she was towed in to Bombay, India, where she arrived on 12 June. |

== 22 August ==
List of shipwrecks: 22 August 1859
| Ship | State | Description |
|---|---|---|
| Beatrice | United Kingdom | The ship ran aground on the Bishop's Rock She was on a voyage from Cardiff, Glamorgan to Liverpool, Lancashire. She was refloated on 25 August and put in to Solva, Pembrokeshire in a severely leaky condition. |
| Charles Buck | United States | The ship was destroyed by fire at Bombay, India. |
| City of Calcutta | United Kingdom | The ship sank in the Hooghly River. She was on a voyage from Craigie, Perthshire to Calcutta, India. |
| Faerie Queene | United Kingdom | The ship ran aground on the Arklow Bank, in the Irish Sea off the coast of County Wicklow. She was on a voyage from the Clyde to Ceyon. She was refloated on 25 August and towed in to Kingstown, County Dublin. |
| Henburg | United Kingdom | The ship caught fire at Port Chalmers, New Zealand and was scuttled. |
| Margaret | United Kingdom | The ship ran aground at the mouth of the River Eden. She was refloated the next day and resumed her voyage. |

== 24 August ==
List of shipwrecks: 24 August 1859
| Ship | State | Description |
|---|---|---|
| Asia | (United Kingdom of Great Britain and Ireland) British North America | The ship sprang a leak and foundered in the Atlantic Ocean. Her crew were rescued by Lisette (France). Asia was on a voyage from Newcastle upon Tyne, Northumberland to Bridgeport, Connecticut. United States. |
| Celestine | United Kingdom | The schooner was driven ashore at Redcar, Yorkshire. She was on a voyage from South Shields, County Durham to Whitby, Yorkshire. She was refloated and resumed her voyage. |
| Cynthia | United Kingdom | The ship was driven ashore on Saaremaa, Russia. She was on a voyage from Sunderland, County Durham to Kronstadt, Russia. She was refloated on 29 August with the assistance of a steamship and resumed her voyage. |
| Ilos | Norway | The barque was wrecked on the Goodwin Sands, Kent, United Kingdom. She was on a voyage from Newport, Monmouthshire, United Kingdom to Helsinki, Finland. |
| James | United Kingdom | The schooner struck the pier and sank at Egremont, Lancashire. Her crew survived. She was on a voyage from Arklow, County Wicklow to Garston, Lancashire. |
| Mary | Portugal | The schooner was wrecked on the Silloth Bank. |
| Providence | United Kingdom | The ship caught fire and foundered in the North Sea off Bridlington, Yorkshire. Her crew were rescued by the smack Sisters (United Kingdom). Providence was on a voyage from King's Lynn, Norfolk to Newcastle upon Tyne, Northumberland. |

== 25 August ==
List of shipwrecks: 25 August 1859
| Ship | State | Description |
|---|---|---|
| Ben Bolt | United States | The ship was wrecked at Brindisi, Kingdom of the Two Sicilies. Her crew were rescued. She was on a voyage from Trieste to London, United Kingdom. |
| Dove | United Kingdom | The ship ran aground on the Creggy Bank, in the River Severn and sank. Her crew were rescued. She was on a voyage from Gloucester to Wexford. |
| Drie Gebroeders | Netherlands | The ship was driven ashore on Gotland, Sweden. She was on a voyage from Saint Petersburg, Russia to a Dutch port. |
| Friden | Denmark | The ship was lost near "Leming". Her crew were rescued. She was on a voyage from Hull, Yorkshire, United Kingdom to Copenhagen. |
| Harriet Newell | (United Kingdom of Great Britain and Ireland) British North America | The schooner was driven ashore at Winged Point, Nova Scotia. Her crew were rescued. She was consequently condemned. |
| Hendrika | Netherlands | The schooner was driven ashore and wrecked on Fårö. She was on a voyage from Newcastle upon Tyne, Northumberland, United Kingdom to Saint Petersburg. |
| Marie | France | The brigantine collided with another vessel and sank in the Mediterranean Sea 30 nautical miles (56 km) off Algiers, Algeria. Her crew were rescued by Conception (France). Marie was on a voyage from Marseille, Bouches-du-Rhône to Algiers. |
| Ranger | United Kingdom | The tug was in collision with the paddle steamer Venus (United Kingdom) and sank at Greenock, Renfrewshire. Her crew were rescued. |

== 26 August ==
List of shipwrecks: 26 August 1859
| Ship | State | Description |
|---|---|---|
| Forest Monarch | United Kingdom | The ship was abandoned in the Pacific Ocean. Her 23 crew took to three boats. They were rescued by the schooners Cochief and Flyaway (both United States). Forest Monarch was on a voyage from San Francisco, California to the Puget Sound. |
| Horizont | Hamburg | The ship ran aground at Melbourne, Victoria. She was on a voyage from Melbourne to Guam. She was refloated and put back to Melbourne. |
| Juliane | Kingdom of Hanover | The ship sank between Bornholm and Ertholmene, Denmark. Her crew were rescued by a fishing smack. She was on a voyage from Antwerp, Belgium to Saint Petersburg, Russia. |
| Kate | (United Kingdom of Great Britain and Ireland) New South Wales | The ship ran aground on the Barrel Rock. She was on a voyage from Newcastle to Launceston, Tasmania. She was refloated and towed in to Launceston. |
| Rose | United Kingdom | The ship ran aground at Shoreham-by-Sea, Sussex. She was on a voyage from Hartlepool, County Durham to Shoreham-by-Sea. She was refloated on 5 September and found to be severely lealy. |
| William and Mary | United Kingdom | The steamship suffered a boiler explosion in the River Tyne whilst racing Louise Crawshay with the loss of one of her three crew. Survivors were rescued by Louise Crawshay. |
| Unnamed | France | The schooner, a tender to the brig Granville, was run down and sunk in the Grand Banks of Newfoundland by the barque Return (United Kingdom) with the loss of two of her six crew. Survivors were rescued by Return. |

== 27 August ==
List of shipwrecks: 27 August 1859
| Ship | State | Description |
|---|---|---|
| Leopard | United Kingdom | The steamship was damaged by fire at Hull, Yorkshire. She was on avoyage from Hull to Kronstadt, Russia. |
| Nugget | (United Kingdom of Great Britain and Ireland) British North America | The barque ran aground on a reef off Pictou Island, Nova Scotia. She was on a voyage from Saint John, New Brunswick to Richibucto, New Brunswick. |
| Rose in June | United Kingdom | The smack sprang a leak and sank at Llanaelhaearn, Caernarfonshire. Her crew survived. She was on a voyage from Porthdinllaen to Llanaelhaearn. |

== 28 August ==
List of shipwrecks: 28 August 1859
| Ship | State | Description |
|---|---|---|
| Mary | United Kingdom | The brig was driven ashore on Miscou Island, Nova Scotia, British North America. She was consequently condemned. |
| Unity | (United Kingdom of Great Britain and Ireland) Cape Colony | The brig departed from Table Bay for Port Elizabeth and East London. She subsequently foundered with the loss of all on board; wreckage washed up in Saldanha Bay. |

== 29 August ==
List of shipwrecks: 29 August 1859
| Ship | State | Description |
|---|---|---|
| Chieftain | United Kingdom | The ship foundered off the Pescadore Islands. Her crew were rescued by Bantang Annaur (Flag unknown). Three passengers were rescued on 21 September by Brothers (United Kingdom). Chieftain was on a voyage from Shanghai to Amoy, China. |
| Ellen | United Kingdom | The ship capsized at Runcorn, Cheshire and was wrecked. |
| Jean Bart | France | The barque was driven ashore in a typhoon and Amoy. |
| Lawrens Koster | Netherlands | The barque was driven ashore and wrecked in a typhoon at Amoy. |
| Machto | Hamburg | The schooner was driven ashore at "Jakow", China. Two of her crew were murdered by the local inhabitants. |
| Mary Ann | United Kingdom | The brig ran aground in the North Sea off Lowestoft, Suffolk. She was on a voyage from Newhaven, Sussex to Newcastle upon Tyne, Northumberland. She was refloated and resumed her voyage. |
| Ocean Bride | United Kingdom | The schooner was driven ashore at Aberdeen. She was on a voyage from Aberdeen to East Wemyss, Fife. |
| Plymouth | United Kingdom | The schooner's cargo shifted in a west-northwesterly force 9 gale, and she foundered in the Bristol Channel 12 miles (19 km) south-west of Newport, Monmouthshire, after she sprang a leak. Her crew were rescued. She was on a voyage from Newport to London with railway track. |
| Solstice | United Kingdom | The barque was driven ashore in the Sea of Marmora. She was on a voyage from Taganrog, Russia to Falmouth, Cornwall or Queenstown, County Cork. |
| Three Sisters | United Kingdom | The pilot boat was driven ashore and wrecked at Burnham-on-Sea, Somerset. |

== 30 August ==
List of shipwrecks: 30 August 1859
| Ship | State | Description |
|---|---|---|
| Choc | France | The brig sprang a leak and foundered in the Mediterranean Sea 30 nautical miles (56 km) off Cape de Gatt, Spain. Her crew survived. She was on a voyage from Marseille, Bouches-du-Rhône to Larnaca, Ottoman Cyprus. |
| Colin Campbell | United Kingdom | The ship was driven ashore in the River Wyre. She was on a voyage from Fleetwood, Lancashire to Miramichi, New Brunswick, British North America. She was refloated on 12 September. |
| Mary | United Kingdom | The schooner was wrecked on the Silloth Bank, in the Irish Sea off the coast of Cumberland. She was on a voyage from Port Dinorwic, Caernarfonshire to Port Carlisle, Cumberland. |
| Maia | United Kingdom | The ship was wrecked on the La Folle Reef. She was on a voyage from the Rio de la Hacha to Liverpool, Lancashire. |
| Ospreinsingen | Norway | The brigantine was abandoned off the Isle of Man. Her crew were rescued by the Castletown Lifeboat. |
| Rebecca Elizabeth | Netherlands | The ship was lost on the Hinder Bank, in the North Sea off the coast of Zeeland with the loss of all on board. She was on a voyage from Newcastle upon Tyne, Northumberland, United Kingdom to Rotterdam, South Holland |
| Ricardo | Flag unknown | The ship was driven ashore and severely damaged at Valletta, Malta. She was on a voyage from Berdyansk, Russia to a British port. She was refloated on 3 September. |
| Supply | United Kingdom | The ship ran aground on the Barber Sand, in the North Sea off the coast of Norfolk. She was refloated and resumed her voyage. |
| T. E. Schutt | Flag unknown | The ship was driven ashore and wrecked at Irvine, Ayrshire, United Kingdom. Her crew were rescued. She was on a voyage from Troon, Ayrshire to Bahia, Brazil. |
| Thebes | France | The steamship was wrecked on a reef off Hainan Island, China. All on board survived. She was on a voyage from Hong Kong to Turon, Empire of Đại Nam. |
| Verbena | United Kingdom | The sloop ran aground on the Dowsing Sand, in the North Sea off the coast of Norfolk. She was on a voyage from Hartlepool, County Durham to King's Lynn, Norfolk. She was refloated and put in to Great Yarmouth, Norfolk in a leaky condition the next day. |

== 31 August ==
List of shipwrecks: 31 August 1859
| Ship | State | Description |
|---|---|---|
| Bride | United Kingdom | The steamboat struck a sunken wreck and sank in the River Thames near London Bridge. All on board were rescued. |
| Dragon | United States | The barque ran aground on a reef 40 nautical miles (74 km) south of Zanzibar. She was on a voyage from Zanzibar to Salem, Massachusetts. She was refloated on 3 September by HMS Clive (Royal Navy) and towed back to Zanzibar, where she was condemned. |
| Jessie Miller | United Kingdom | The ship was driven ashore and damaged on Holy Isle, in the Firth of Clyde. She was on a voyage from Liverpool, Lancashire to Saint Mary's, Nova Scotia, British North America. She was refloated with the assistance of a steamship and taken in to Greenock, Renfrewshire, where she arrived the next day. |
| Rhine | United Kingdom | The ship ran aground on the Barber Sand, in the North Sea off the coast of Norfolk. She was refloated and resumed her voyage. |

== Unknown date ==
List of shipwrecks: Unknown date 1859
| Ship | State | Description |
|---|---|---|
| Agenoria | United Kingdom | The ship foundered off Bornholm, Denmark. Her crew survived and arrived at Elsinore on 22 August. She was on a voyage from Newcastle upon Tyne, Northumberland to Kronstadt, Russia. |
| Alex | United Kingdom | The ship foundered in the Atlantic Ocean. Her crew were rescued. She was on a voyage from Cardiff, Glamorgan to Quebec City, Province of Canada, British North America. |
| Alexander Edmond | United Kingdom | The ship foundered in the Atlantic Ocean. Her crew were rescued by the steamship Lady Aunared (Flag unknown). |
| Auguste Friedriche or August Frederic | Prussia | The brig foundered in the English Channel. Her crew were rescued by St. Mathurin (France) and landed at Cadiz on 8 August. Auguste Friedriche was on a voyage from Odesa to Falmouth, Cornwall, United Kingdom with grain. |
| Brothers | (United Kingdom of Great Britain and Ireland) Tasmania | The schooner was driven ashore on Waterhouse Island before 23 August. She was on a voyage from Hobart to Geelong, Victoria. |
| Duncan | (United Kingdom of Great Britain and Ireland) Straits Settlements | The ship was wrecked on a reef off Hainan Island, China. Her crew survived. |
| Emerald | United Kingdom | The steamship was driven ashore and wrecked on Carrick Island, in Ramsey Bay before 28 August. She was on a voyage from Ayr to Liverpool, Lancashire. |
| Helen | (United Kingdom of Great Britain and Ireland) New South Wales | The cutter was driven ashore in the Bellambi Creek. She was on a voyage from Bellambi to Melbourne, Victoria. |
| Henrietta | United Kingdom | The ship was driven ashore and wrecked near North Shields, County Durham. |
| Jamaica | United Kingdom | The ship was driven ashore at Bahia, Brazil. |
| Marie et Pauline | France | The ship was driven ashore and wrecked at Namsos, Norway. She was on a voyage from Newcastle upon Tyne, Northumberland, United Kingdom to the Norwegian towns of Ålesund and Namsos. |
| Metina Margaretha | Norway | The schooner foundered. Her crew were rescued by Antillas (United Kingdom). |
| Ovid | Flag unknown | The ship was destroyed by fire in the North Sea before 25 August. |
| Shah Jehan | India | The ship was destroyed by fire in the Indian Ocean before 8 August. Some survivors were rescued by the schooner Turquoise (French Navy), 64 crew were rescued by Vasco de Gama (flag unknown); 350 coolies were drowned. |
| Solstice | United Kingdom | The ship was driven ashore near Gallipoli, Ottoman Empire. |
| Tamarac | United Kingdom | The ship was driven ashore in the Morro de São Paulo before 8 August. She was on a voyage from Liverpool to Bahia. |
| Tye | United Kingdom | The ship foundered in the Atlantic Ocean. Her crew survived. She was on a voyage from Cardiff to Quebec City. |
| Victor | France | The ship was wrecked at Saugor, India. |
| Victoria Packet | (United Kingdom of Great Britain and Ireland) Victoria | The barque was driven ashore and wrecked in the Bellambi Creek. She was on a voyage from Bellambi to Melbourne. |
| Windsor Castle | United Kingdom | The ship foundered in the Atlantic Ocean before 12 August. Her crew survived. She was on a voyage from Newcastle upon Tyne, Northumberland to Aden. |
