= Napperby =

Napperby may refer to:

- The Napperby Block, a parcel of land forming part of the Wapma Thura–Southern Flinders Ranges National Park since late 2021
- Napperby, South Australia, a locality in South Australia
- Napperby Station, a pastoral lease in Northern Territory, Australia
