= Germein Bay =

- Location in South Australia
- Location: Spencer Gulf, South Australia
- Coordinates: 33°05′31″S 137°58′37″E
- Type: Bay
- Etymology: John Germein
- Part of: Spencer Gulf
- Primary inflows: Port Pirie River
- Basin countries: Australia
- Designation: Marine park: Upper Spencer Gulf (part only)
- Max. length: about 17 km (11 mi) (east-west)
- Max. width: about 17 km (11 mi) ( north-south)
- Max. depth: 15 m (49 ft)
- Islands: Weeroona
- Settlements: Port Pirie; Weeroona Island; Port Germein (settlements listed from south to north)

Germein Bay is a bay in the Australian state of South Australia located at the northern end Spencer Gulf on the gulf's east coast to the immediate north of the city of Port Pirie. Its extent includes the port known as ‘Port Pirie’ and the former port of Port Germein. Since 2012, the majority of the bay has been within the protected area known as the Upper Spencer Gulf Marine Park.

== Description ==
Germein Bay is located in South Australia at the northern end of Spencer Gulf on the gulf's east coast to the immediate north of the city of Port Pirie. It lies between the headland of Point Jarrold at its southern extremity and Ward Spit, a shoal exposed at low tide, which extends west from Ward Point on the mainland at its northern extremity.

The bay's south coastline consists of “thick mangroves with partially-flooded land behind; it is bordered by drying sand and mud flats, which dry for a distance of 1 nautical mile (1.9 km; 1.2 mi).” The mangroves extend along the east side of the bay up to the southern side of a feature known both as Weeroona Island and as Mount Ferguson. The western side of Weeroona Island and the remainder of the coastline of the bay (not including Ward Spit) are “free of mangroves and dominated by low energy beaches fronted by wide sand flats.”

The bay's coastline includes the following settlements - the city of Port Pirie on the west and south sides of the estuary of the Port Pirie River, Weeroona Island on Weeroona Island in the south-east corner of the bay and Port Germein in the north-east corner of the bay.

The bay is described in an American source as being “fouled by numerous shoals, banks, and shallow depths.” The middle of the bay is occupied by a shoal called Cockle Spit which is exposed at low tide. Water depths within the bay are less than 5 metres (16 ft) with exception to the part of the bay between Cockle Spit and Ward Spit in the bay's northern side where depths are greater than 10 metres (33 ft) with a charted maximum depth of 15.2 metres (50 ft).

== History ==
The bay is reported as being named after John Germein, a pilot employed by the South Australian government during the 19th century and a brother of Benjamin Germein.

== Port ==
=== Official extent of harbor and port ===
A portion of the bay and some waters to its immediate west have been declared under the Harbors and Navigation Regulations 2009 both as a 'harbor' and as a port known respectively as the 'Harbor of Port Pirie' and as 'Port Pirie'. The 'harbor' is enclosed by a line from Ward Point in the northeast to a point located in Spencer Gulf to the west about 13 nautical miles (24 km; 15 mi) north-west of Mount Ferguson and then to a point in the south on the south coast of the bay immediately west of Port Pirie. The port consists of part of the Port Pirie River, the channel extending north to the Port Germein jetty and the channel extending west from the jetty to the middle of Spencer Gulf and the western limit of the harbor.

=== Approach to port facility ===
Ships need to pass through the bay in order to reach to the port facility at Port Pirie. This is achieved by entering the bay on its northern side where the water is the deepest. This passage is known as the ‘northern channel’. At a point between Cockle Spit and the jetty at Port Germein, a dredged channel needs be entered in order to proceed in a southerly direction to the estuary of the Port Pirie River where berths are located. This channel is known as the ‘Port Pirie shipping channel’.

=== Port infrastructure ===
Port infrastructure within the bay consists of a port facility, a range of navigation aids, a jetty and a number of boat ramps.

The port facility which is located in the Port Pirie River consists of eight berths catering both for ships up to 183 metres (600 ft) in length and the bulk loading of materials such as acid, grain and ores such as lead and coal. The facility is managed by Flinders Ports.

Navigation aids located within the bay consist of lit beacons along the alignment of both the northern channel and the Port Pirie shipping channel, flashing lights on both the Port Germein jetty and the south side of Weeroona Island and a number of buoys and other markers in the southern side of the bay to identify specific navigation hazards.

A jetty is located at Port Germein which was originally constructed in 1881 for use as a wharf for loading ships and which is now used for recreational activities such as fishing.

Boat ramps are located (from south to north) in the Port Pirie River in the suburbs of Solomontown and Port Pirie, on Weeroona Island and at Port Germein.

== Protected area status ==
The part of the bay's extent which has not declared to be a port under state law has been occupied by the Upper Spencer Gulf Marine Park since 2012.
