= From the Wreck =

2017 novel by Jane Rawson

- First edition cover
- Author: Jane Rawson
- Cover artist: Peter Lo
- Language: English
- Genre: Science fiction
- Publisher: Transit Lounge
- Publication date: 1 March 2017
- Publication place: Australia
- Media type: Print paperback original
- Pages: 272
- Award: Aurealis–Science Fiction Novel (2017)
- ISBN: 9780995359451
- OCLC: 971585879

From the Wreck is a 2017 historical and science fiction novel by Australian writer Jane Rawson. It was first published as a paperback original in March 2017 in Australia by Transit Lounge. The book is based on the 1859 shipwreck of the Australian steamship, the SS Admella and is a fictionalised account of Rawson's great-great-grandfather George Hills, a survivor from the wreck, and his encounter with a shapeshifting alien.

From the Wreck was well received by Australian critics. It won the 2017 Aurealis Award for Best Science Fiction Novel, and was shortlisted for several other awards. In April 2019 the book was published in hardcover in the United Kingdom by Picador.

== Plot summary ==
The steamship Admella smashes into a reef off the coast of South Australia. George Hills, a ship's steward, is one of a number of survivors clinging to the remains of the ship for eight days with no food and water. He is protected from the bitter cold by Bridget Ledwith, an elusive passenger he had seen earlier on the boat. Many die, but George and Bridget are rescued. George recovers in hospital, but Bridget disappears without a trace.

An octopus-like shapeshifting alien (Note: The alien is unnamed and its gender is not revealed.) flounders in Earth's unfamiliar waters. It has fled its ocean-covered home-world and seeks refuge on Earth. Alone and lost, it boards the Admella and assumes the shape of the first creature it sees, a passenger named Bridget Ledwith. When the ship is wrecked, "she" finds herself with George, and protects him by wrapping herself around him. The real Bridget drowns, but George is rescued, and the alien goes into hiding.

George is haunted by images of the woman from the wreck, and tries unsuccessfully to find her. He marries his fiancée Eliza and has three children, but George is sure that the midwife at the birth of his firstborn, Henry, is the woman from the wreck. He struggles to live a normal life and is convinced Bridget put curse on him. He notices a large birthmark on Henry's back, and believes that to be her work. The alien is hiding in plain sight in George's household disguised as a cat, and when Henry is born, attaches itself to his back. As Henry grows up, the alien periodically infiltrates his mind and gives him glimpses of her lost world. When George sees Henry's unusual behaviour and his obsession with the ocean, he is sure the boy is also cursed.

In an attempt to ease his torment, the alien reveals itself to George as Bridget. But when George sees the woman from the wreck, he immediately attacks her, and the alien quickly morphs back into a cat and flees. A distressed George goes to the shore, takes off his clothes, and floats in the water. He wishes he were never rescued from the wreck. The alien returns to the ocean and gently touches George with its tentacles. It sends him images of Bridget wrapped around him on the wrecked ship, and explains who it is and where it came from. It shows George how its world was ruined by colonists, and how the survivors fled to another dimension and ended up in Earth's oceans. It tells him it is alone and cannot find any of the others. George tells her there used to be similar cephalopod-like creatures that attacked ships, but they disappeared long ago. The alien realises it arrived here "a million years too late".

George makes peace with the alien, and it attaches itself to his back. When George returns home, the alien becomes the cat again and enjoys the attention of Henry and his father.

== Historical setting ==
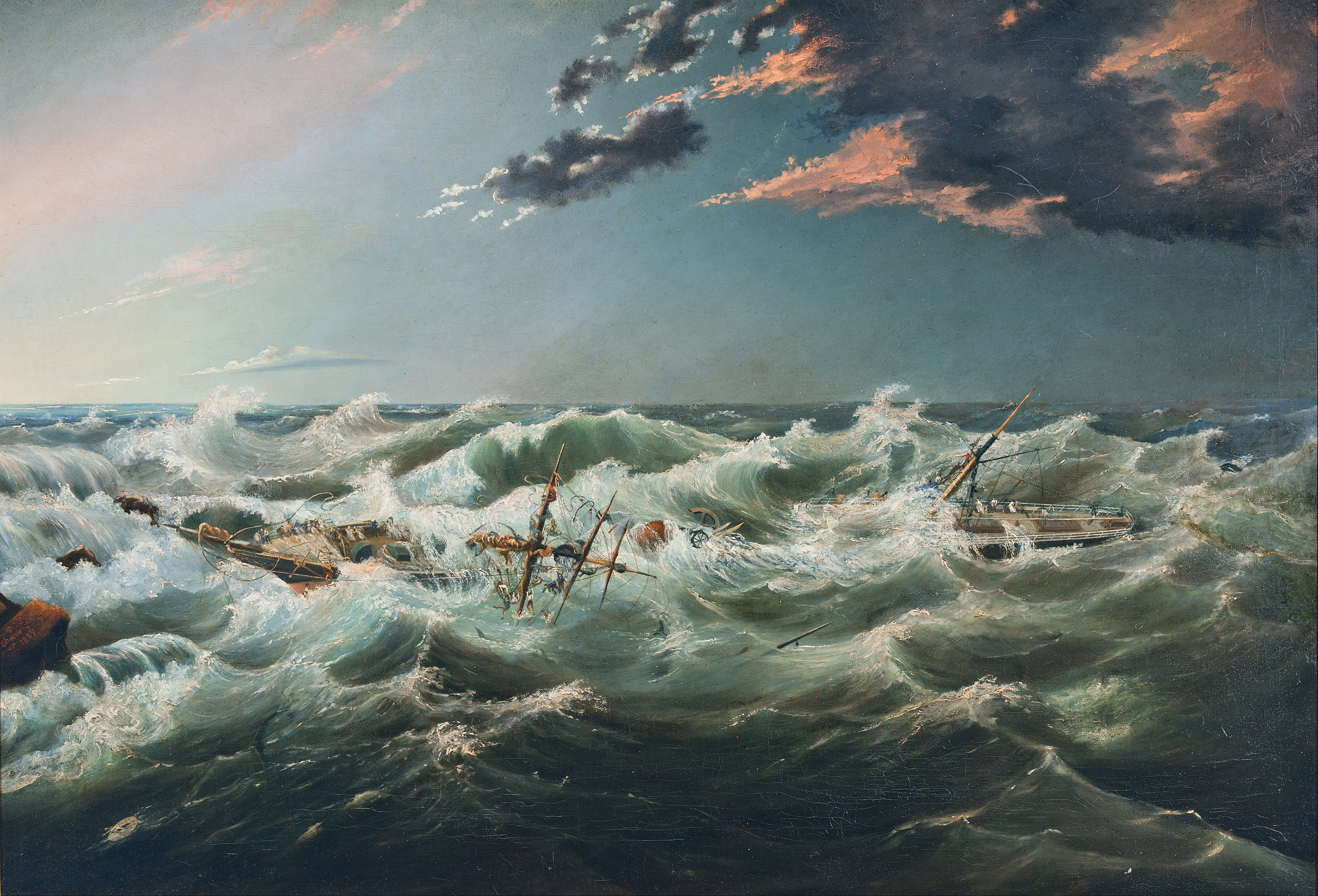
The wreck of the Admella by James Shaw

From the Wreck is based on the 1859 shipwreck of the Australian steamship, the SS Admella, that ran aground on Carpenters Reef in South Australia. For eight days survivors clung to the remains of the ship and slowly died from exposure and lack of food and water. Rescue attempts from the shore were hampered by bad weather, but eventually 24 of the 113 passengers and crew were saved. Among those rescued were George Hills, Rawson's great-great-grandfather, and Bridget Ledwith, the only female survivor. George Hills went on to marry his fiancée Eliza, with whom he bore eight children, including Henry. George died at 86 in 1916. Ledwith's identity remained "a source of mystery and controversy" for years after the wreck. Rawson said that beyond this historical setting, the events in From the Wreck are purely fictional. (Note: In 1990 Bill Collett published a 14-page fictional diary, The Diary of Bridget Ledwith: Sole Female Survivor of the Admella Shipwreck in 1859. The booklet was written for the Admella Festival in 1990.)

The wreck of the Admella has been cited as "one of the worst maritime disasters in Australian history".

== Background ==
Rawson began working on From the Wreck in 2009. She had discovered that her great-great-grandfather was a survivor of the Admella shipwreck, and had attended the 150th anniversary commemoration of the event in August 2009. She said, "When I saw all the descendants of the people who had either died or survived the wreck of the Admella, I thought, 'Wow, there's a story in here. This has affected a lot of people,'" The novel started out as a work of historical fiction, but after a few failed drafts Rawson shelved it. "I don't generally write realist fiction and I really struggled ... It just wasn't my style". She began working on another book about an alien exiled from its home world. Then it occurred to her that the two stories could be combined: an octopus-like alien looking for a new home meeting her great-great-grandfather on a shipwreck. Rawson said the novel takes place in Australia in the mid-19th century, when white settlers did not know what they would find in the unexplored bush and oceans. Finding an alien probably would have been no more surprising than a marsupial.

Having an alien as one of the book's characters enabled Rawson to explore writing from the point of view of another species. She said it was "technically difficult", but added that her alien "is a metaphor ... she stands in for all the other species that humans just don't give a rat's arse about." She said writing a novel like this was a risk because it exposed her preoccupation with the environment. She was therefore surprised at the attention the book received, and in particular winning the Aurealis Award. Rawson remarked, "To me, [the award] is a big deal ... it feels like Australian literary culture is shifting to be a little more comfortable with the idea of speculation … shifting slightly towards more blurry ideas of what reality is and what truth is."

== Reception ==
Reviewing the book in Books+Publishing, Alan Vaarwerk said From the Wreck has elements of history, science fiction and magic realism, making it "utterly unique and distinctly Australian". He praised the author's "clear, lyrical prose" and the "breathtaking and revelatory reading experience" it creates. Ed Wright wrote in The Australian that Rawson "stretch[es] our capacity to believe", making apparently incompatible ideas click together. He remarked that her empathy for the characters is "beautiful", particularly for the alien, who he compared to ET in Spielberg's 1982 film. Wright felt that Rawson took a risk anthropomorphising her alien: "it is a poor tool for imagining the inner lives of other beings", but he added, "it's one of the few we have, and Rawson has used it here to create an intriguing tale whose humanity lingers warm long after the reading."

In a review in The Canberra Times, Adam Rivett described From the Wreck as "an old-fashioned historical yarn spliced with Cronenbergian body horror". He pointed out that there are two narrative streams, "lyrical realism and the experimental", which quickly merge to produce "something truly unique and disquieting". Rivett said Rawson depicts the past as "both a recognisable Australia and ... an alien landscape". Writing in the Australian literary magazine, Westerly, Christine Sun remarked that just as the alien tries to be human, the human becomes an alien by his inability to be "normal" anymore. She felt that the bond between Henry and the alien benefits both – they each get a new perspective on the world they are struggling to fit in to. Sun noted that by imagining what could have happened to Rawson's great-great-grandfather, she turned an apparently ordinary man's life into something extraordinary.

Writing in the Australian Book Review, Fiona Wright called From the Wreck "a deeply ecological novel", not quite cli-fi, but one that emphasises "the connectedness of creatures: animal, human, and other worldly". She said the novel's "greatest strength" is George's characterisation, and described Rawson's handling of the trauma he experienced as "subtle and skilful". Wright also called Henry "a delightful and fascinating character". She did, however, feel that the voice of the shapeshifter, while "lyrical and fittingly alien", sometimes comes across as "overdetermined", which tends to "lose ... its novelty" after a while. She also criticised the novel's structure, saying that the purpose of some parts of the narrative are not clear, particularly some of the secondary characters, whose stories appear incomplete. But overall, Wright called it is "an ambitious novel" the way it "bend[s] and blend[s] genres".

== Awards ==
Year	Award	Category	Result	Ref
2017	Aurealis Award	Science Fiction Novel	Won	
2017	Readings Prize	New Australian Fiction	Shortlisted	
2018	Adelaide Festival Awards for Literature	Fiction	Shortlisted	
2018	Barbara Jefferis Award	—	Shortlisted	
2018	Miles Franklin Award	—	Longlisted	
2018	Voss Literary Prize	—	Longlisted	
2019	Kitschies	Red Tentacle for Best Novel	Shortlisted	

== See also ==
- Anthropomorphism

== Works cited ==
- Rawson, Jane (2017). From the Wreck (e-book ed.). Melbourne, Australia: Transit Lounge Publishing. ISBN 978-0-9953594-9-9.
