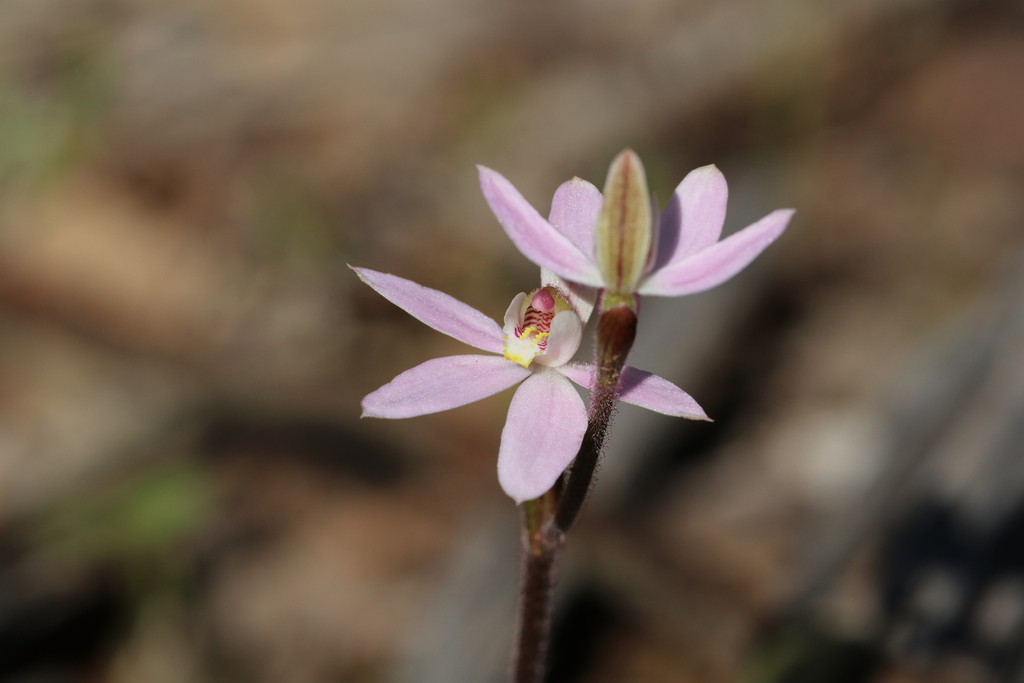
- In Mount Remarkable National Park

Scientific classification
- Kingdom: Plantae
- Clade: Embryophytes
- Clade: Tracheophytes
- Clade: Spermatophytes
- Clade: Angiosperms
- Clade: Monocots
- Order: Asparagales
- Family: Orchidaceae
- Subfamily: Orchidoideae
- Tribe: Diurideae
- Genus: Caladenia
- Species: C. coactilis

Binomial name
- Caladenia coactilis D.L.Jones

Synonyms
- Petalochilus coactilis (D.L.Jones) D.L.Jones & M.A.Clem.

= Caladenia coactilis =

Thick fingers

Species of orchid

Caladenia coactilis, commonly known as thick fingers, is a plant in the orchid family Orchidaceae and is endemic to South Australia. It is a ground orchid which grows singly or in loose groups and has a single hairy leaf and one or two flowers which are bright pink inside and brownish on the back.

== Description ==
Caladenia coactilis is a terrestrial, perennial, deciduous, herb with an underground tuber and which grows singly or in loose groups. It has a single, erect, densely hairy, linear to lance-shaped leaf, 8–12 cm (3–5 in) long and 4–8 mm (0.2–0.3 in) wide. One or two flowers are borne on a spike 10–18 cm (4–7 in) tall. The flowers are bright pink inside and brownish on the outside due to a dense covering of glands and are about 30 mm (1 in) in diameter. The dorsal sepal is erect, 18–22 mm (0.7–0.9 in) long, 4–5.5 mm (0.16–0.22 in) wide, linear to lance-shaped or egg-shaped and curves forward. The lateral sepals and petals are 18–23 mm (0.7–0.9 in) long, 3.5–7 mm (0.1–0.3 in) wide, lance-shaped, slightly curved, held horizontally and spread widely. The sepals and petals are glabrous on the inside and densely covered with brownish glands on their backs. The labellum is broadly egg-shaped when flattened and bright pink with many narrow, dark red lines. It has three lobes with the lateral lobes erect and surrounding the column and with three pairs of linear teeth pointing forward on their edges. The central lobe of the labellum curves forward, with between two and four rows of bright yellow calli and has a yellow tip. Flowering occurs from August to September.

== Taxonomy and naming ==
Caladenia coactilis was first formally described by David L. Jones in 1991 and the description was published in Australian Orchid Research. The type specimen was collected in the Telowie Gorge Conservation Park. The specific epithet (coactilis) is a Latin word meaning "made thick", referring to the thickness of many of the organs of this orchid.

== Distribution and habitat ==
This caladenia usually grows in open forest and is found in the southern Flinders Ranges and northern Mount Lofty Ranges.
