= Telowie =

- Suburb
- Coordinates: 33°03′23″S 138°04′01″E
- Country: Australia
- State: South Australia
- Region: Yorke and Mid North
- LGA: District Council of Mount Remarkable
- Location: 213 km (132 mi) N of Adelaide; 28 km (17 mi) SW of Melrose
- Established: 13 March 1997

Government
  - State electorate: Stuart
  - Federal division: Grey

Population
  - Total: 95 (2016 census)
- Time zone: UTC+9:30 (ACST)
  - Summer (DST): UTC+10:30 (ACST)
- Postcode: 5540
- County: Frome
- Mean max temp: 22.7 °C (72.9 °F)
- Mean min temp: 9.3 °C (48.7 °F)
- Annual rainfall: 474.7 mm (18.69 in)
Suburbs around Telowie
Port Germein	Port Germein; Bangor	Bangor
Germein Bay; Port Germein	Telowie	Wirrabara
Germein Bay	Nelshaby	Beetaloo Valley

Telowie is a locality in the Australian state of South Australia located about 213 kilometres (132 mi) north of the state capital of Adelaide and about 28 kilometres (17 mi) south-west of the municipal seat of Melrose.

It spans Telowie Gorge and the former Telowie Gorge Conservation Park (now part of Wapma Thura–Southern Flinders Ranges National Park).

The 2016 Australian census which was conducted in August 2016 reports that Telowie had a population of 95 people.

Telowie is located within the federal division of Grey, the state electoral district of Stuart and the local government area of the District Council of Mount Remarkable.
