= Weeroona Island =

Island in South Australia

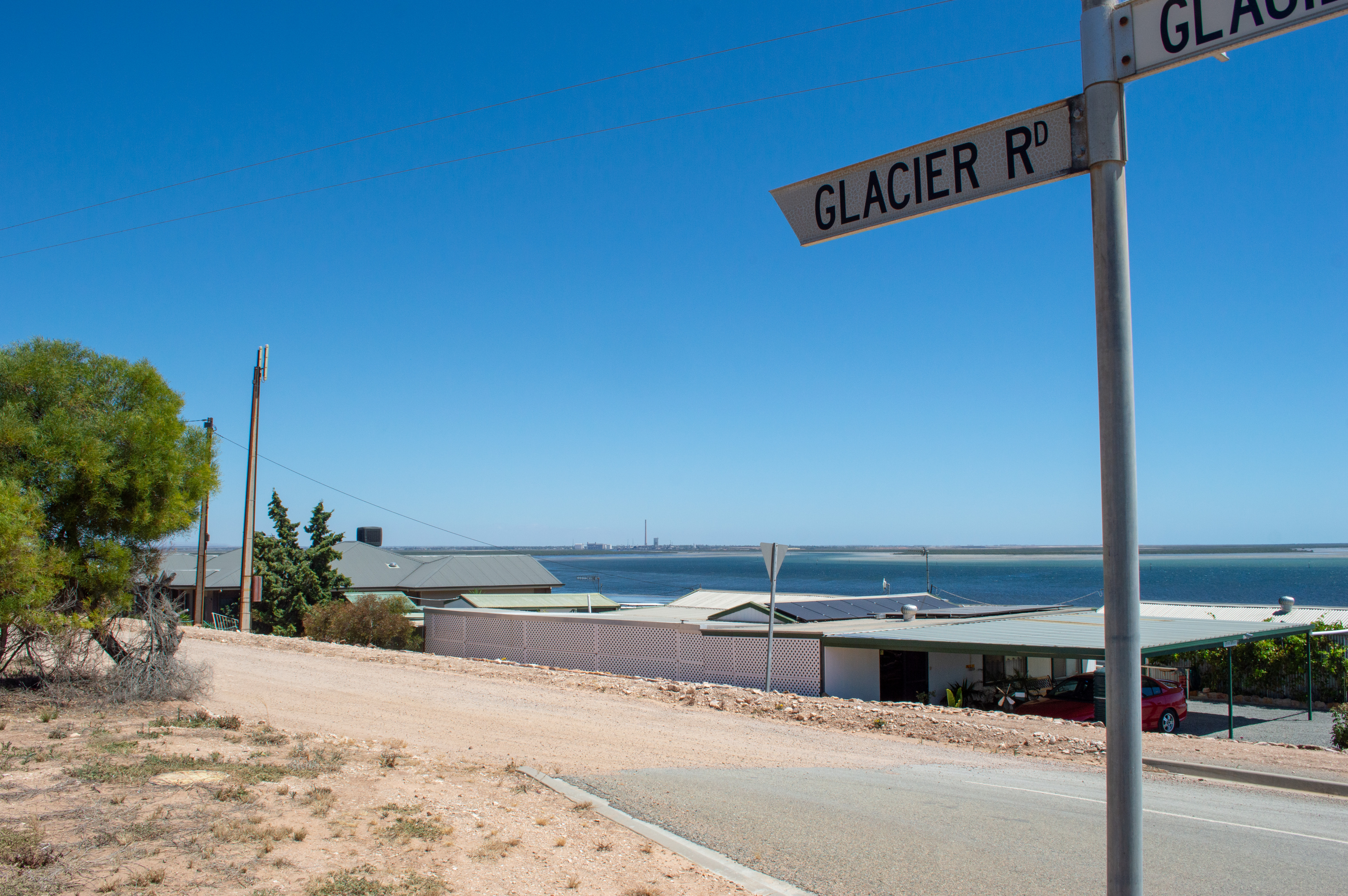
- Corner of Glacier Road and Mount Ferguson Drive

- Location within South Australia

Geography
- Location: Spencer Gulf
- Coordinates: 33°06′14.33″S 138°01′41.68″E

Administration
- Australia

Weeroona Island is a 77 ha island in the Australian state of South Australia located in Germein Bay, Spencer Gulf between the city of Port Pirie and town of Port Germein. It features the wreck of the York, coastal shacks, sandy beaches and is connected with the mainland by a 300 m-long (980 ft) causeway spanning mangroves and tidal flats.

== Geography ==
The western side of the island is free of mangroves and dominated by low energy beaches fronted by wide sand flats. Weeroona Island beach wraps around the western half of the 1 km wide island for 1.6 km, the eastern half being surrounded by mangroves. While detached from the mainland at high tide, at low tide it is linked by tidal flats. Road vehicle access is provided by a 300 m-long (980 ft) causeway. Beaches border the southern, western and northern shore and generally consist of a narrow high tide beach. 20 shacks line the southern shore, and larger freehold titles are privately owned along the northern shore. Shorelines are backed by grassy slopes which rise to a 30 m-high (98 ft) island crest. The beaches are fronted by a narrow strip of sand, behind which vegetated tidal flats extend for hundreds of metres north and south. The western side is an exception to this, where the spread of tidal flat vegetation is limited by the tidal channel.

== History ==
=== Port Flinders ===
In the 1850s, Weeroona Island was considered a prospective port location, and was known as Port Flinders. The port was to connect with the existing channel which serviced Port Pirie. It was considered for the possible conveyance of copper ore from Mount Remarkable and Melrose in the Southern Flinders Ranges. Port Pirie's continued expansion made the plan to establish Port Flinders obsolete.

=== Wreck of the York ===
Weerona Island is the last resting place of the York. The Adelaide Steam and Tug Company bought her in 1877 for use in Port Adelaide as a lighter. The ship was deliberately run aground on the island's southern side so that it could be used as a loading platform. From the loading platform, ketches could moor at Weeroona Island at high tide. Stone was then quarried on the island and transported back to Port Pirie to be used in the construction of its harbor. The wreck remains off the southern shore of the island and is exposed at low tide.

=== Munitions Dump ===
Around the time of World War II, the island was used as a munitions dump. In December 1951, the Army conducted a search for unexploded ordnance in adjacent waters following weekend training exercises. Two live bombs were located off Weeroona Island. Many more 'harmless' bombs were present near the north-western corner of Weeroona Island, by the channel. Some of these were visible at low tide. Once located, the two live bombs were destroyed by Army personnel.

=== Weeroona Holiday Camp ===
In April 2013, Weeroona Island resident and historian Den Kennedy confirmed the ruins of the Weeroona Holiday Camp which was opened in 1929. The remains of a terrazzo floor, a winding dirt track and a rock-pool swimming pond exist on the island as relics of the former public camp.

It served as a holiday-makers’ retreat, complete with huts, tents and a dance hall. It was officially opened as the South Sea Palais on 10 November 1934. It was decorated with a cool green colour scheme and featured palms and bamboo. The camp came to life after the Broken Hill Associated Smelters used 13 barges to relocate the buildings from Weeroona Bay near Point Lowly on the western side of Spencer Gulf. The Weeroona Bay resort at Point Lowly had previously offered a place for smelter employees suffering poor health to relax and recover.
