= Jane Rawson =

Australian writer and environmentalist

- Born: Jane Bryony Rawson; Canberra, Australia
- Occupations: Writer, environmentalist
- Spouse: Andy Maurer
- Writing career
- Period: 2003–present
- Genres: Speculative fiction, non-fiction
- Notable work: From the Wreck
- Notable awards: Aurealis Award for best science fiction novel Viva la Novella
- Website: Official website

Jane Rawson is an Australian writer and environmentalist. She has published four books, and is best known for her 2017 novel From the Wreck, which won the Aurealis Award for best science fiction novel. In 2018 Rawson was a recipient of the Australia Council grants for arts projects for individuals and groups in the literature category to the value of AU$34,830.

== Life ==
Rawson was born and schooled in Canberra, Australia. After studying journalism at the University of Canberra, she relocated to Melbourne where she was employed as a travel writer by Lonely Planet. Her job took her to several destinations around the world, including California, Prague and Phnom Penh. After running out of money, Rawson returned to Melbourne where she became editor of the environment and energy section of a news website, The Conversation. In 2013 Rawson moved to the Huon Valley in Tasmania where she took up employment as a bureaucrat.

Rawson has published several essays on environment issues, and in 2003 she and James Whitmore co-authored a book, The Handbook: Surviving and Living with Climate Change. Between 2013 and 2017, Rawson published three works of fiction, including Formaldehyde, a novella with elements of absurdist science fiction and magic realism, and From the Wreck, a science fiction novel of first contact featuring a shapeshifting alien. From the Wreck won the 2017 Aurealis Award for best science fiction novel, and is a fictionalised account of Rawson's great-great-grandfather George Hills, a survivor from the shipwreck of the Australian steamship the SS Admella in 1859.

Rawson said in an interview that despite all the problems associated with being a novelist, she admits to enjoying it: "You're making this magical, beautiful imaginary thing out of absolutely nothing that you could share with other people if you want or you could just do it for the joy of finishing it … It doesn’t hurt anyone." She singled out Ali Smith and George Saunders are two writers she admires. "I really like writers who have a strong voice and a very tender, rueful attitude towards humans; those who know what a fucking disaster we all are." Rawson said that her next book will probably be about exploring "authoritarianism and individualism in society." She explained that she wants to investigate claims that Australia almost sided with Germany during the Second World War.

== Bibliography ==
=== Fiction ===
Novels

- A Wrong Turn at the Office of Unmade Lists (Transit Lounge, 2013)
- From the Wreck (Transit Lounge, 2017)
- A History of Dreams (Brio Books, 2022)

Novellas

- Formaldehyde (Seizure, 2015)

Short stories

- "Instructions for an Installation" (appears in Normal Service Will Resume: Fast Fiction for Any Trip, Cardigan Press, 2003)
- "A Dynasty of Square Standers" (Vignette Press, 2008) – published separately
- "In Registry" (appears in The Sleepers Almanac No. 5, Sleepers Publishing, 2009) – as J. B. Rawson
- "We Saw the Same Sky" (appears in Overland no. 218, 2015)
- "The Reference" (appears in Tincture Journal no. 12, 2015)
- "Lake" (appears in Review of Australian Fiction, vol. 19 no. 2, 2016)
- "The Unwild World" (appears in Seizure, December 2016)
- "One Short Mile from Land" (appears in Griffith Review, no. 55, 2017)
- "Amy's Twin" (appears in Review of Australian Fiction, vol. 23 no. 1, 2017)
- "The Right Side of History" (appears in Ecopunk! Speculative Tales of Radical Futures, Ticonderoga Publications, 2017)
- "Kangaroo" (appears in Kill Your Darlings April 2019)

=== Non-fiction ===
- Jane Rawson and James Whitmore: The Handbook: Surviving and Living with Climate Change (Transit Lounge, 2015)

Source: AustLit: The Australian Literature Resource

== Awards ==
- 2014 – Most Underrated Book Award for A Wrong Turn at the Office of Unmade Lists
- 2015 – Viva la Novella Award for Formaldehyde
- 2017 – Aurealis Award for best science fiction novel for From the Wreck
- 2018 – Recipient of the Australia Council grants for arts projects for individuals and groups in the literature category (AU$34,830.00)
