= SS Admella =

Australian passenger steamship wrecked in 1859

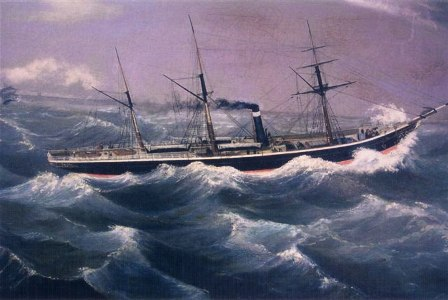
- SS Admella in a heavy sea

History

Australia
- Name: SS Admella
- Owner: Robert Little and 7 others
- Route: Adelaide–Melbourne–Launceston
- Builder: Lawrence Hill and Company, Port Glasgow; A & J Inglis
- Cost: £15,000
- Launched: 17 September 1857
- In service: March 1858
- Fate: Wrecked near Cape Banks, off the town of Carpenter Rocks, South Australia on 6 August 1859
- Status: historic shipwreck

General characteristics
- Class & type: Steamship
- Tonnage: 395 GRT
- Length: 60 m (200 ft)
- Beam: 8 m (26 ft)
- Depth: 4.2 m (14 ft)
- Installed power: twin 100 hp (75 kW) steam engines
- Propulsion: Steamer screw
- Sail plan: Three sails
- Speed: 17 knots (31 km/h)
- Capacity: 113
- Crew: 29

SS Admella was an Australian passenger steamship that was shipwrecked off the coast of the colony of South Australia in 1859. It broke up after striking a submerged reef near Cape Banks, off the coast near Carpenter Rocks, southwest of Mount Gambier, in the early hours on 6 August 1859. Survivors clung to the wreck for over a week and many people took days to die as they glimpsed the land from the sea and watched as one rescue attempt after another failed.

With the loss of 89 lives, mostly due to cold and exposure, it is one of the worst maritime disasters in Australian history. Admella disaster remains the greatest loss of life in the history of European settlement in South Australia. Of the 113 on board, 24 survived, including only one woman, Bridget Ledwith. Of the 89 dead, 14 were children. The 150th anniversary of the disaster was marked in August 2009 by events across the south east of South Australia and at Portland, Victoria.

== History and description ==
SS Admella (so named for her circuit Adelaide, Melbourne, Launceston) was built by Lawrence Hill and Co. at Port Glasgow, Scotland in 1857. She was an iron, single-screw steamer nearly 60 metres long and eight metres at her widest and displaced about 395 tons. At the time she was one of the fastest and most luxurious ships on the Australian intercolonial trade routes. On the regular Adelaide–Melbourne run, her fastest voyage had once been made in 42 hours.

In 39 voyages between Adelaide and Melbourne there had never been cause for alarm aboard Admella, with no need for life boats or life belts. The vessel's only captain, Hugh McEwan was a cautious and capable master mariner. Admella had been built with watertight bulkheads, riveted to the hull. These were designed as a special safety feature, but were ultimately the cause of a catastrophic break up of the ship into three exposed sections in the first 15 minutes of the disaster.

== Final voyage ==
Under the command of Captain Hugh McEwan, Admella left Port Adelaide for what was to be her final trip early on 5 August 1859, on her usual run to Melbourne with 84 passengers and 29 crew. Her cargo consisted of 93 tons of copper, flour for the Victorian goldfields, general merchandise, and four racehorses. Due to the heavy swell, one of the horses fell over. To right it the ship changed course slightly, while the horse was put on its feet.

At four o'clock next morning, when the vessel was approaching the Cape Northumberland light, the captain believed himself to be far from land. In reality, however, the ship was close to a dangerous reef at 37°52′47″S 140°21′3″E, probably from a current that carried the vessel shorewards.

Suddenly she grated on a reef and, keeling over, lay broadside on to the heavy seas. An effort was made to lower the boats, but two of them were smashed and the third broke adrift. The swell lifted her further on to the reef, impelling her with such force that she lay on the summit of the ridge, with her starboard side high out of the water. In less than 15 minutes Admella broke into three parts and several passengers were washed overboard. A few rockets were found and fired in the hope of attracting the attention of lighthouse-keepers at Cape Northumberland, 13 nautical miles (25 km) away, but they were damp and failed to ignite correctly. The wreck site is around 4 km (2.5 mi) from Cape Banks.

Daylight revealed a deserted coast about 1,100 yards (1 km) away interrupted by raging surf, and plans were being formulated for an attempt to reach shore when a steamer was seen in the distance. Signals were hurriedly erected on the remaining mast and rigging, and the ship's bell rung, but the vessel, Admella's sister ship Havilah, passed without seeing them. On the second day the sea was calmer and two seamen, John Leach and Robert Knapman, succeeded in reaching the shore with the aid of a raft. Exhausted, they hurried through the night to alert Cape Northumberland lighthouse.

== Rescue efforts ==
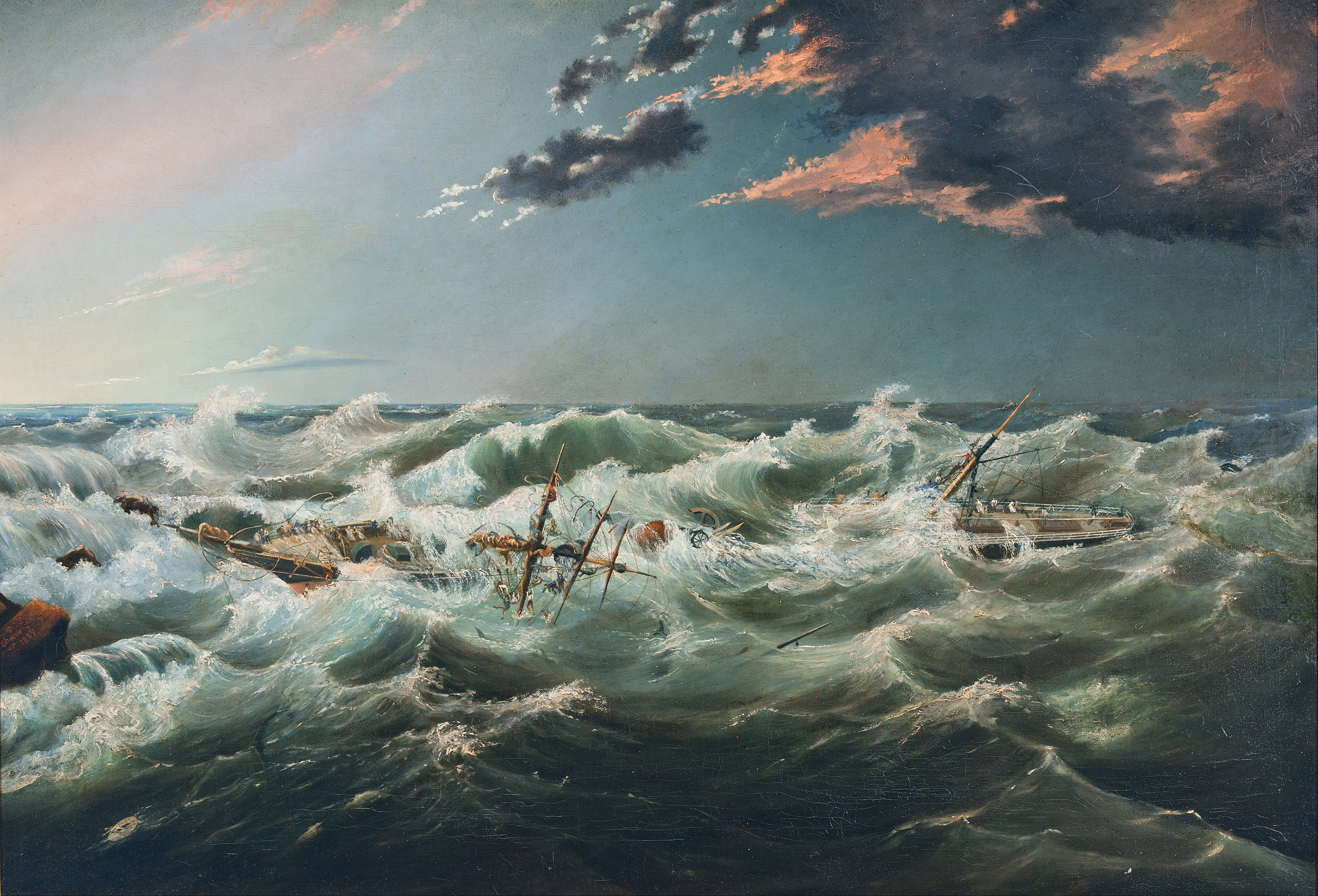
The Admella wrecked, Cape Banks, 6th August, 1859, by James Shaw

The lighthouse was without telegraph and so the lighthouse keeper, Ben Germein, set off to ride 10 miles (16 km) to Mount Gambier to telegraph authorities in Adelaide 240 nautical miles (450 km) north west and Portland 54 nautical miles (100 km) east. Corio left from Adelaide and Ladybird from Portland but, due to poor information, both rescue boats had difficulty locating the now desperate Admella.

Meanwhile, the wreck was battered by the heavy swell. Captain McEwan shared out what little food remained and had to prevent survivors from drinking salt water, which had begun to take the lives of those who drank it. Others, exhausted by their ordeal, simply slipped into the sea to their death. In the words of one lifeboat captain they were:

more like statues than human beings; their eyes fixed, their lips black, for want of water, and their limbs bleached white and swollen through exposure to the relentless surf.

Later-owner of the 1864 Melbourne Cup winner, the recollections of passenger Hurtle Fisher were given:

The vessel broke into three pieces when she struck, and two of the pieces went down at once. The portion Mr. Fisher was on was jammed on the rock, and those who had strength remained there for eight days, with next to nothing to eat or drink. Sitting on the bulwarks they could see the sharks all round them, and there was no inducement to jump off and try to swim to shore. One passenger, sitting next to Mr. Fisher, did make an effort to put an end to his captivity, but, as Mr. Fisher put it, when relating the terrible experience, "he jumped in just underneath where I was sitting, and the sharks tore him to pieces at once." When Mr. Fisher went aboard the Admella he weighed 9 st. 7 lb, and when he came off he was 5 st. 12 lb. One of the horses—The Barber—swam ashore, and afterwards ran in Flying Buck's Champion Race. He was clothed and in a box. How he freed himself Mr. Fisher could not imagine.

Over the next few days, several rescue attempts were made by Corio and Ladybird rescue boats. Rockets were fired to try to get lines aboard but mountainous seas and severe winter storms drove the rescuers back and lives were lost as the lifeboats were swamped. A further attempt was made to launch one of Admella's own lifeboats, which had washed ashore, but it too was unsuccessful. By Saturday, one full week after the wreck, Admella's lifeboat, skippered by Ben Germein and Corio's boat were launched from the beach and managed to crash through the surf and reach the wreck. Eventually three people made it onto one boat, which then capsized, drowning one man.

The Portland lifeboat which had been towed to the scene by Ladybird had made an earlier attempt to reach the wreck but was driven back by the raging seas. Now it was finally successful in coming alongside the wreck and the remaining 19 survivors jumped and fell into the boat. They were transferred to Ladybird which returned to Portland. The lifeboat is now housed in the Portland Maritime Museum.

== Aftermath ==
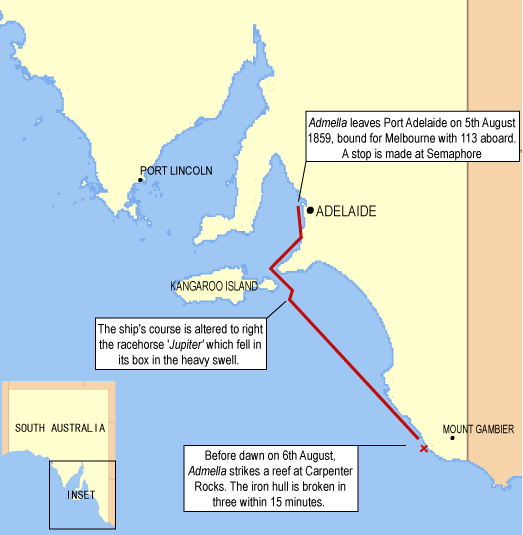
The final journey of Admella. (Click to enlarge)

As news of the disaster reached Adelaide and Melbourne, interest in the wreck reached fever pitch; telegraph offices throughout the colonies were crowded, while newspapers printed extra editions only to see them sold out immediately upon release. In Adelaide, the news of the disaster brought hundreds of people to the telegraph office to hear the story as it unfolded; businesses closed and both Houses of Parliament adjourned.

For a few weeks crews who had participated in the rescue were treated as heroes, especially Captain Greig and the crew of Ladybird. In the community, businesses and individuals raised money for the Admella Shipwreck Reward and Relief Fund for rescuers and survivors. After the commission of inquiry into the wreck of Admella, the loss was attributed to the effects of a current that pushed the vessel off course, although investigations were also held into a magnetic disturbance in the area that may have affected the compasses on iron-hulled ships. The commission found that a contributing factor had been the way that the watertight bulkheads had been inserted – the holes for the hundreds of rivets had weakened the metal. The inquest also resulted in the installation of the telegraph at Cape Northumberland.

The SS Admella was cited, at the time, as being a key reason why the Cape Jaffa Lighthouse was commissioned.

In 1951, a much larger ship, SS Corio, was wrecked on the same reef and sank, but all aboard were rescued.

On 5 August 2009, a candlelight vigil was held for the victims of the disaster, when a memorial to the ship, called "The Navigator" was re-dedicated in a new location in Port Adelaide. The memorial, made of granite, lyten steel, breakwater rocks, and wood, was created by local sculptor Karen Genoff and first unveiled in 1992.

Admella's wreck site is protected by the Commonwealth Historic Shipwrecks Act 1976. The entry in the Australasian Underwater Cultural Heritage Database says: "The remains are badly broken and scattered on a reef. The engines, boilers, iron plating, copper ingots and her fittings can be seen lying amongst the reef. A small bronze signal cannon was recovered from the site." Its site is close to the wreck of the Corio, and the swell can make diving dangerous at times. The Port Macdonnell Maritime Museum houses a number of artefacts recovered from SS Admella.

As of 2024, Admella remains South Australia's worst maritime disaster.

== Admella relics ==
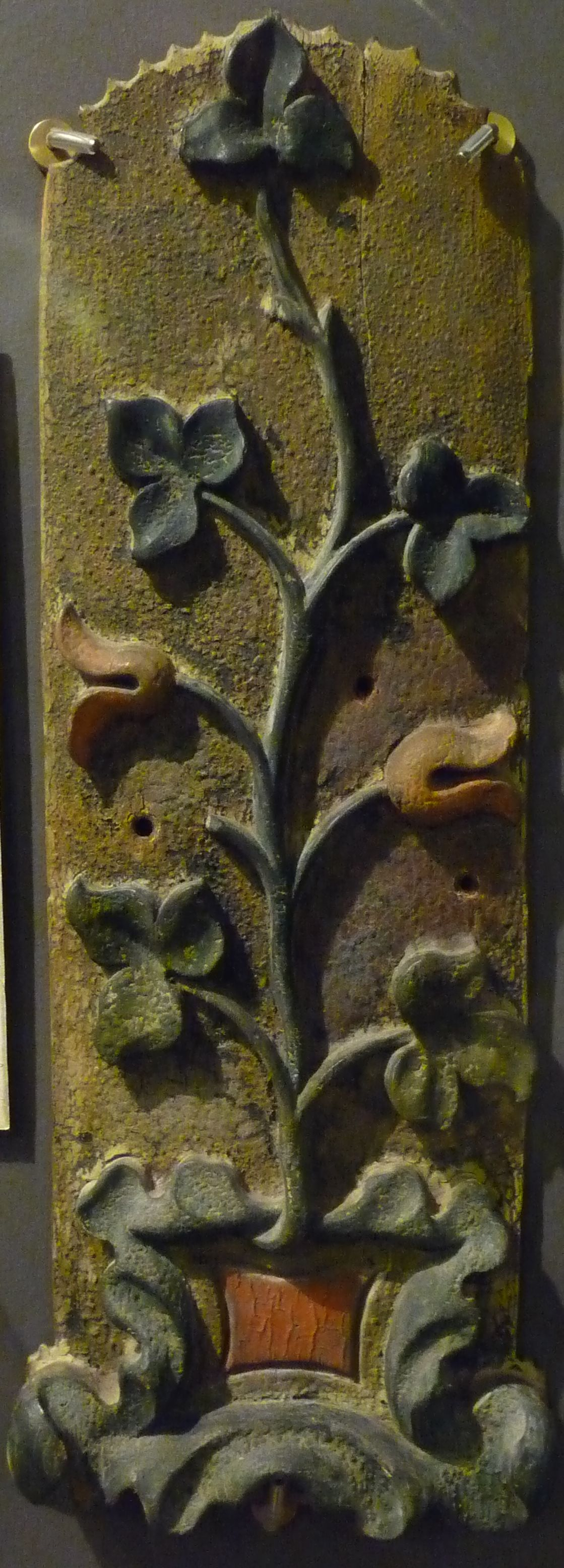
Ornate wood from Admella shipwreck, 1859

There are several places where it is possible to view aspects of Admella wreck and the subsequent rescue attempts.

- The Port MacDonnell & District Maritime Museum located at Meylin Street, Port MacDonnell, has a display that includes, amongst other things, a small bronze cannon, the ship's bell and a carving set from Admella.
- The Portland Maritime Museum has a permanent Admella display that includes the Portland lifeboat that rescued many of Admella's survivors.
- At the Cape Banks Lighthouse, near the town of Carpenter Rocks, there is a memorial to Admella and those who died.
- "From the Wreck" is a poem written by Adam Lindsay Gordon telling of the ride made by Peter Black to Mount Gambier to raise the alarm following the wreck of Admella. Adam Lindsay Gordon lived in Dingley Dell, near Port MacDonnell in South Australia, from 1864 to 1867.
- In Port MacDonnell there is a house that has been constructed, in part, using timbers from Admella's wreck.
- The copper being transported by Admella came from copper mines at Kapunda; Kapunda Museum has in its collection an ingot of copper salvaged from the wreck.

== Cultural references ==
- Scottish-born artist James Shaw produced two paintings of the ship, which are held in the Art Gallery of South Australia (AGSA).
- AGSA also holds a painting of the wreck by Charles Hill, and a later one by him of a rescue boat.
- In 1990 Bill Collett published a 14-page fictional diary, The Diary of Bridget Ledwith: Sole Female Survivor of the Admella Shipwreck in 1859. The booklet was written for the Admella Festival in 1990.
- In 2009 a docudrama directed and written by Brenton Manser titled The wreck of Admella was released.
- In 2017 Jane Rawson published an historical novel, From the Wreck, based on the wreck of the Admella. It is a fictionalised account of Rawson's great-great-grandfather George Hills, a survivor from the wreck, and his encounter with a shapeshifting alien.
- In January 2026, a new novel titled A Light on the Rocks by author Helen Edwards, centred on lighthouse families living offshore at the time of SS Admella shipwreck, was published. Edwards had been awarded a mid-career fellowship with the State Library of South Australia, supported by Writers SA, and a grant from the History Trust of South Australia, to research and write the book. The book has been recommended as a class text for primary school students in Grades 4 or 5.

== See also ==
- List of disasters in Australia by death toll
- List of shipwrecks of Australia
- Timeline of Australian history
- Geltwood (nearby wreck from 1876)
- James Hurtle Fisher whose two sons were passengers - one died and the other survived.
- Benjamin Germein A notable figure who saved many on the wreck of Admella
