= Wirrabara Range Conservation Park =

Former protected area in South Australia

- IUCN category VI (protected area with sustainable use of natural resources)
- Location within South Australia
- Location: South Australia
- Nearest city: Wirrabara
- Coordinates: 33°02′35″S 138°09′24″E
- Area: 26.80 km^{2} (10.35 sq mi)
- Established: 5 December 2017
- Governing body: Department for Environment and Water

Wirrabara Range Conservation Park was a protected area located in the Australian state of South Australia in the locality of Wirrabara about 215 kilometres (134 mi) north of the state capital of Adelaide and about 11 kilometres (6.8 mi) west of the town of Wirrabara. On 26 November 2021 it became part of the Wapma Thura–Southern Flinders Ranges National Park, along with several other conservation parks.

The conservation park occupied crown land in Sections 4, 10 and 19, and Allotment 105 in Deposited Plan 116702 within the cadastral unit of the Hundred of Darling, which was previously gazetted as a native forest reserve under the Forestry Act 1950. On 5 December 2017, the above-mentioned land lost its status as a native forest reserve and was given status as a conservation park under the National Parks and Wildlife Act 1972 by proclamation. Also, on the same day, another proclamation ensured that “certain existing and future rights of entry, prospecting, exploration or mining” permitted under the state's Mining Act 1971 and Petroleum and Geothermal Energy Act 2000 would apply to the extent of the conservation park.

An announcement made on 29 September 2017 by Ian Hunter, the then Minister for Sustainability, Environment and Conservation, and Leon Bignell, the then Minister for Forests, in the South Australian government described the creation of the conservation park as follows:

High value native vegetation in the western part of the Wirrabara forest are being safeguarded for future generations and incorporated into the greater South Australian parks system. The South Australian Government has approved the transfer of more than 3,500 hectares of land in Wirrabara forest from ForestrySA to the state’s parks system under the management of the Department of Environment, Water and Natural Resources. The land transfer creates one linked up area for conservation, recreation and tourism providing continued enjoyment for both the local community and visiting tourists. In addition to protecting ongoing public access, the transfer will also ensure co-ordinated conservation and fire management plus the potential for the future establishment of nature based-tourism ventures.

Its name is derived from the Wirrabara Native Forest Reserve and was approved on 16 Nov 2017 by the Surveyor-General.

The conservation park is classified as an IUCN Category VI protected area. As of 2018, it covered an area of 26.80 square kilometres (10.35 sq mi).

== See also ==
- Protected areas of South Australia
