= Telowie Gorge Conservation Park =

Former protected area in South Australia

- IUCN category III (natural monument or feature)
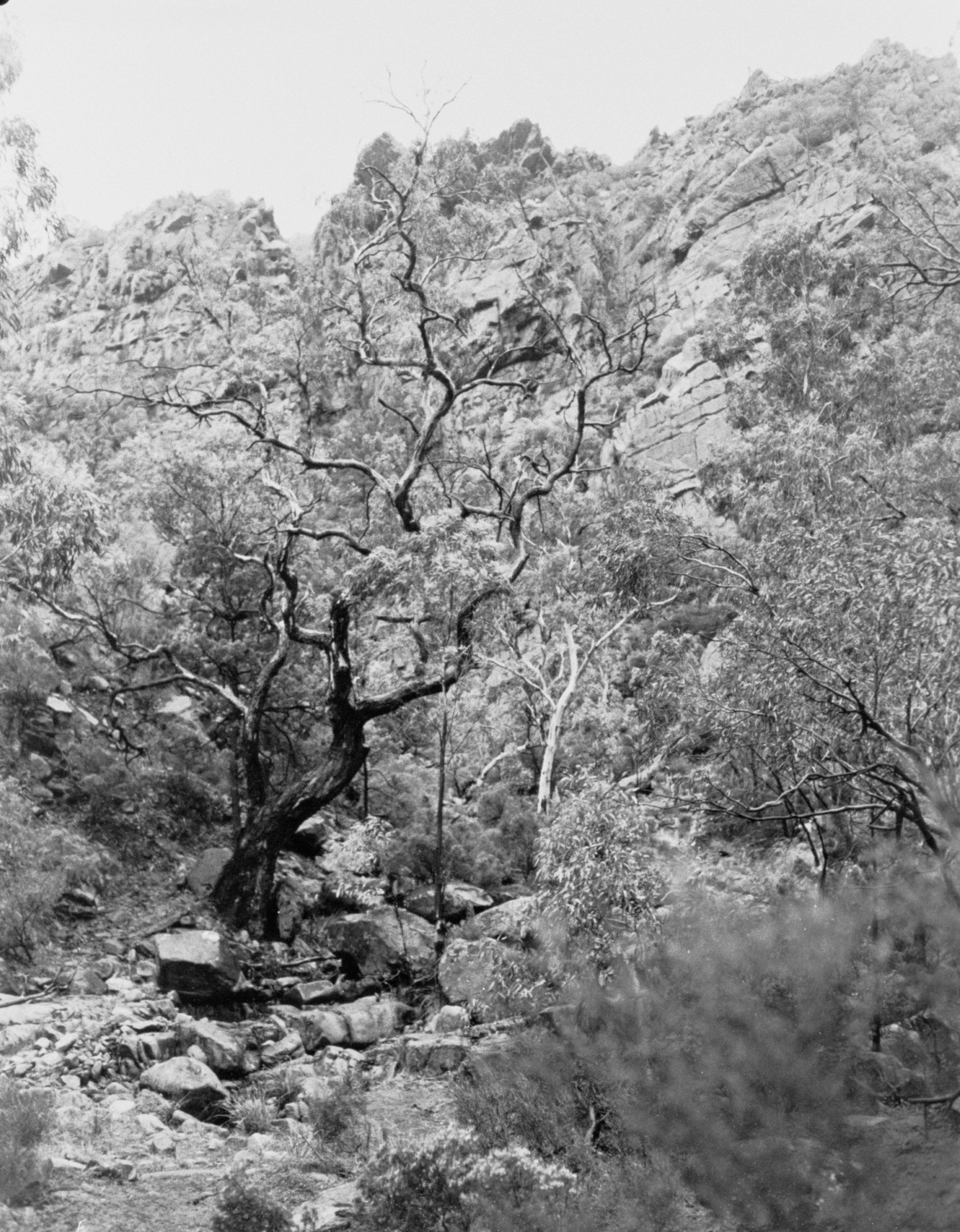
- Telowie Gorge

- Location within South Australia
- Location: South Australia
- Nearest city: Port Germein.
- Coordinates: 33°2′20.4″S 138°7′29.27″E
- Area: 19.67 km^{2} (7.59 sq mi)
- Established: 3 September 1970
- Governing body: Department for Environment and Water

Telowie Gorge Conservation Park, formerly Telowie Gorge National Park, was a protected area located in the Australian state of South Australia to the east of the town of Port Germein in the gazetted locality of Telowie. It became part of the Wapma Thura–Southern Flinders Ranges National Park on 25 November 2021.

== History ==
The conservation park was proclaimed under the National Parks and Wildlife Act 1972 in 1972 in respect to an area of land already under statutory protection since 1970 as the Telowie Gorge National Park.

The conservation park was abolished on 25 November 2021. On the same day, its land holding was constituted as part of the Wapma Thura–Southern Flinders Ranges National Park.

== Location and description ==
The conservation park was located about 7.5 kilometres (4.7 miles) east of the town of Port Germein in the gazetted locality of Telowie, and occupied 19.76 km^{2} (7.63 sq mi).

In 2010, the conservation park was described by its managing authority as follows:

Home to a colony of yellow-footed rock-wallabies, Telowie Gorge Conservation Park features some of the most dramatic scenery in the Southern Flinders Ranges. The gorge and its diverse landforms have been created by Telowie Creek, which over time has cut a deep gorge through the range. Today, the gorge creates a rich variety of habitats for animals and plants from both the southern temperate and arid regions. During winter, Telowie Creek flows from the gorge onto the plains.

It included four trails as well as access to the Heysen Trail, which passes along part of the eastern side of the conservation park, and two other local trails.

The conservation park was classified as an IUCN Category III protected area, and was last managed by the South Australian Department for Environment and Water.

== See also ==
- Protected areas of South Australia
