= Benjamin Germein =

South Australian seaman and lighthouse-keeper

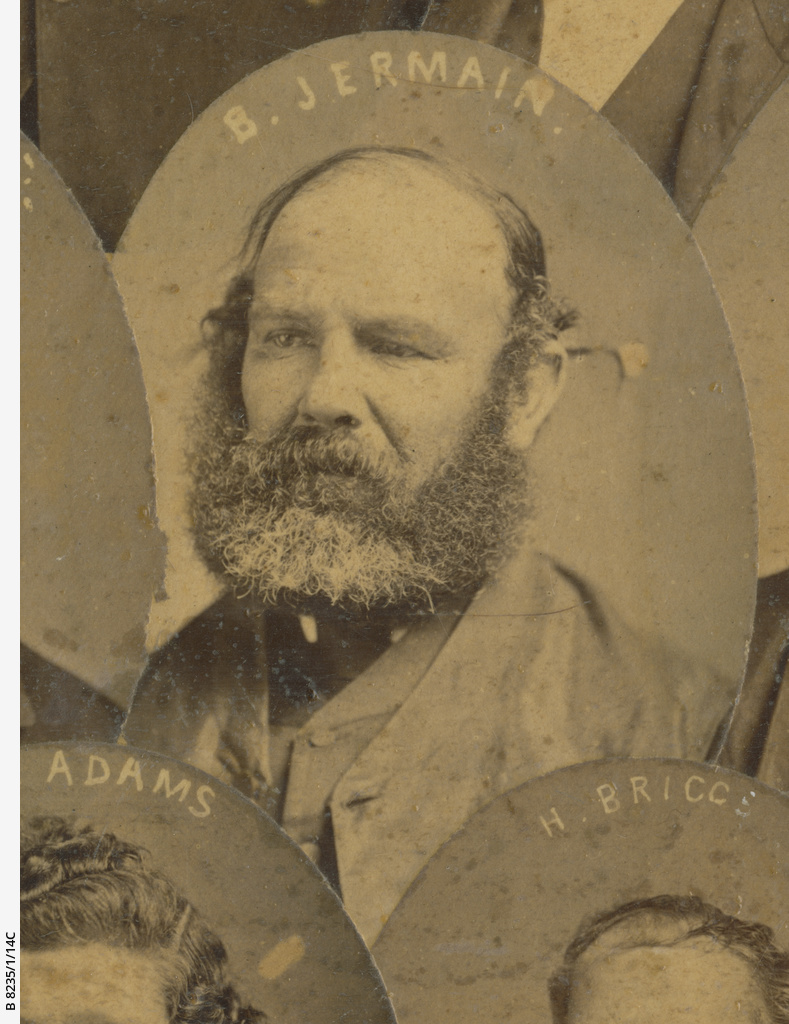

Benjamin "Ben" Germein (c. 1826 – c. July 1893) was a seaman and lighthouse-keeper in South Australia who is remembered as a hero of the wreck of the steamship Admella.

== History ==
Ben arrived in South Australia on 22 April 1837 with his two brothers John and Samuel, John's wife Olinda (née Gover), his sister Thirza Elizabeth and her husband William Doddridge aboard the South Australian from Portsmouth. Their father John Germein sen. (c. 1786 – 23 April 1869) arrived in the Java in 1840.

As soon as the Port was settled, Captain Quin was appointed pilot and the Germein brothers were his crew, all of whom were afterwards made pilots. Ben proved a remarkably clever pilot and was known for his ability to manoeuvre vessels under canvas. He was the first person to sail a ship under full sail the length of the Port River. He commanded the s.s. Corio between Port Elliot and Goolwa for River Murray Steam Navigation Company multiple times during 1857 until she foundered at the Murray mouth and the company disposed of her. Later he was chosen as master of the Government schooner Yatala, where he distinguished himself on several occasions, and became acquainted with every small corner of South Australia's coastline.

== Lighthouse keeper ==
Afterwards Germein was chosen for the McDonnell harbormastership, being also in charge of the lighthouse on Cape Northumberland, in company with Captain John Dagwell, who afterward became harbormaster at Glenelg.

=== Wreck of the Admella ===
On Saturday, 6 August 1859, the ship Admella (see main article) struck a reef, the third of a series off Cape Northumberland and a mile off shore. Germein was alerted to the fact two days later when two of its sailors, John Leach and Robert Knapman, arrived at the lighthouse in a pitiful state. They had made their way to shore in an improvised raft in order to raise the alarm. Germein made his way to Donald Black's nearby farm, where he borrowed a horse and set off to ride the 16 km to Mount Gambier to summon assistance. He was, however, thrown from the horse and young Mr. Black completed the journey, and by 3.15 p.m. had telegraphed the news to Adelaide and Portland, Victoria, and returned the same evening with a trooper. Germein later was instrumental in rescuing three men from the wreck, in one of Admella's lifeboats they had patched up. A fourth, a passenger identified only as a "German pedlar", was drowned when the boat overturned in the breakers.

=== Wreck of the John Ormerod ===
The brig John Ormerod left Adelaide with a cargo of flour for Sydney on 21 October 1861 and was hit by a squall 20 miles south of Cape Northumberland and capsized in heavy seas. Captain Thomas J. Sevier ordered the mainmast cut away and the ship righted. In the process, the mate was swept into the sea and the steward, who was in the cabin, drowned. The captain ordered the men to lash themselves to the deck, but few obeyed and all were lost overboard except the captain and two men, Edward Lennon and Alexander Munro. Ben Germein observed the stricken vessel and intercepted her in the lighthouse's new five-oared lifeboat (which had been delivered the previous day), and with Dagwell and crew rescued the three men. The following day they again went out to the John Ormerod, anchored the drifting vessel and recovered the body of the steward. He was later reported as having lost several fingers in rescuing Captain Sevier, of which there was no mention in contemporary reports, though Captain Sevier did suffer a crushed thumb. There were also reports of the lifeboat being inadequate, a claim which was hotly refuted.

== Return to the sea ==
Germein remained in charge of the light house, but relations with his subordinate became strained and he was transferred to the Troubridge lighthouse around the beginning of 1866. In October 1866 he resigned the lighthouse service and successfully applied for renewal of his pilot's licence. It would appear his love of variety had induced him to rejoin the pilot service, of which he was one of the smartest members in days of old, when the principal duties were to boxhaul sailing vessels about. When the pilot's duty changed from sail to steam, Ben Germein lost his sympathy with the service. He felt that "any dredge master or hopper skipper could navigate the river in a steamer, when it wanted a smart fellow to work up a big sailing craft"

== Last days ==
In later years he joined the harbor pilot service, but wanderlust would take hold of him and he would disappear for days or weeks at a time. In March 1880 he took the cutter Albatross from Port Adelaide and spent six weeks cruising around Port Lincoln, the Sir Joseph Banks Group and the Althorpes until Captain Charles Ward Poynter (died 1916) of The Semaphore intercepted him in the steamer Lubra and persuaded him to return home. In February 1891 he left a suicide note at his home but he was found unharmed at Shell Creek near St.Kilda. On 3 July 1893 he disappeared and his absence was reported to the police in August. After a number of search parties failed to find any trace, the water police found his badly decomposed body washed up among the mangroves near Bog Creek in a condition that indicated suicide.

== Family ==
His brother Samuel Germein (c. 1818 – 13 August 1886) was equally notable, being the first pilot contracted by George Fife Angas and David McLaren for the South Australian Company, and who discovered Port Germein and Port Pirie, both being named for him (Port Pirie being originally named Samuel's Creek). Sam was the first skipper of the Government cutter Water Witch. He was married to Mary Ann (c. 1828 – 28 September 1913).

A sister, Thirza Elizabeth (c. 1809 – 15 November 1881), married blacksmith William Doddridge (c. 1807 – 17 July 1867), lived at Angaston.

A sister Eliza married John Nathaniel Wills (c. 1813 – 14 March 1873), of H.M. Customs.

His brother John Germein (1847 – 13 September 1928) married Alice Amy Hodge (1855 – 11 August 1922). A daughter Pearl Alice Irene Germein married Claude Augustus Sprigg (1889 – 23 May 1972) on 17 September 1913. Their youngest son was the renowned geologist Reg Sprigg.

Benjamin married Elizabeth Coulam Heanes (c. 1832 – 17 July 1888). Among their children was a son, also named Benjamin Germein (c. 1860 – 31 May 1932), a customs officer, who married (1) Eliza Amy Boys (c. 1861 – 13 August 1904) on 14 March 1889, (2) Margaret Blyth (c. 1862 – 10 January 1913).

== Recognition ==
- The poet Adam Lindsay Gordon commemorated the Admella rescue in his poem "The Ride from the Wreck"
- Ben was awarded the Gold Medal of the Royal Humane Society.
- He was awarded a Silver Medal from Victoria and South Australia.
- A stone seat at Port MacDonnell, South Australia serves as a memorial.
- A poem "Ben Germein" was published in the South Australian Register of 23 September 1893 and reprinted at least once, in the Border Watch of 23 May 1940.
