= Port Germein, South Australia =

Port Germein
- Town
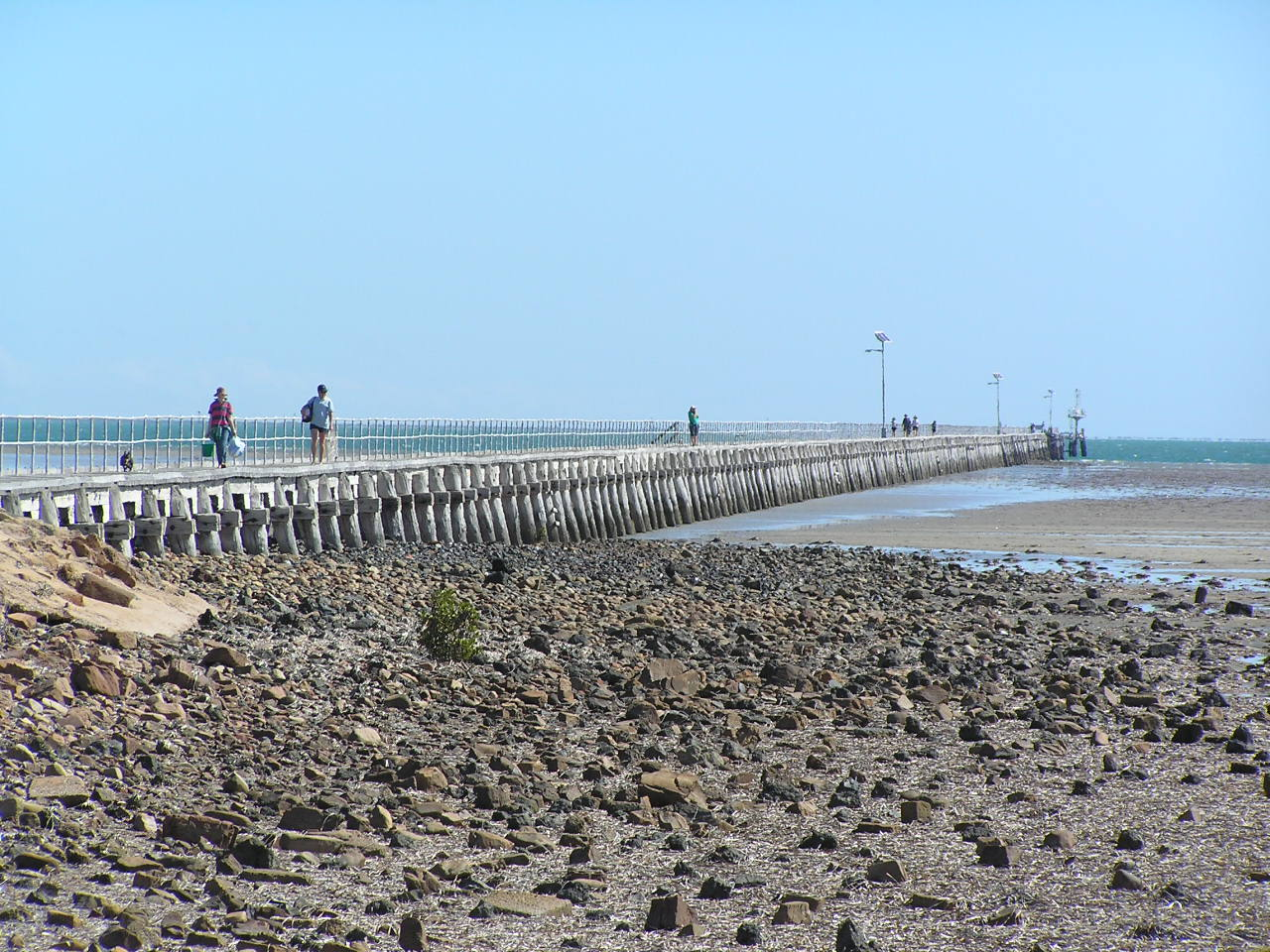
- Port Germein jetty, Dec 2008

- Coordinates: 33°01′0″S 138°00′0″E
- Country: Australia
- State: South Australia
- LGA: District Council of Mount Remarkable
- Location: 219 km (136 mi) N of Adelaide; 19 km (12 mi) N of Port Pirie; 15 km (9.3 mi) N of Weeroona Island
- Established: 1878

Government
  - State electorate: Stuart
  - Federal division: Grey

Population
  - Total: 249 (2006 census)
- Postcode: 5495
Localities around Port Germein
Spencer Gulf	Baroota	Bangor
Spencer Gulf	Port Germein	Bangor; Telowie
Germein Bay (body of water)	Germein Bay; Telowie	Telowie

Port Germein is a small sea-side town in the Australian state of South Australia located about 219 kilometres (136 mi) north of the state capital of Adelaide and about 19 kilometres (12 mi) north of the city of Port Pirie on the eastern side of South Australia's Spencer Gulf overlooking Germein Bay. Port Germein was named after Samuel Germein, who moved into the territory in 1840, although some credit his brother John to be the first European to traverse the area. The township was proclaimed in 1878. Port Germein's population in the 2006 census was 249.

== History ==
Port Germein was once an important transport hub for the surrounding districts following the opening of its jetty in 1881 – at the time known as the longest jetty in the Southern Hemisphere. Due to the shallow water along the coast, the long jetty was built to allow sailing ships to be loaded with grain from surrounding districts. Bagged wheat came from the local area, the eastern side of the Southern Flinders Ranges via Port Germein Gorge (opened in 1879), and from the west coast in smaller boats. About 100,000 bags of wheat were loaded per year. The jetty was extended to its full length of 1680m in 1883. With the opening of the port came an influx of workers from Adelaide, and by 1900 the town's population had grown to over 300. Use of the port declined when rail was extended to Port Germein in 1934, and the jetty was later reduced to its present length of 1532m due to storm damage. The historic Port Germein Jetty Site is listed on the South Australian Heritage Register.

It formerly had its own municipality, the District Council of Port Germein; since 1980, it has been part of the District Council of Mount Remarkable.

== Transport ==
The Augusta Highway and the Adelaide-Port Augusta railway line both pass the east side of the township. The railway line has an 1800m passing loop and a goods siding was commissioned in 2015 and is operated by SCT Logistics.

== Lighthouse ==
A lighthouse was erected at the end of the jetty in 1894, replacing the Port Germein Lightship. The lighthouse was staffed until July 1917, when it was replaced by an AGA flashing light. The lighthouse was re-established at its current site in 1975.

== Jetty ==
The Port Germein jetty opened in 1881, and in 1883 it was extended to a length of 1680 metres. This length, which was necessary because of the town's extremely shallow beach, briefly made it the longest wooden jetty in the southern hemisphere. Currently, following storm damage and subsequent repairs, the jetty is 1532 metres long, still the longest jetty in South Australia. Previously it had a narrow-gauge railway line extending into the township.
