= Weeroona Island, South Australia =

Weeroona Island South Australia
- Coordinates: 33.101930°S 138.031060°E
- Population: 117 (2021 census)
- Established: 1997
- Postcode(s): 5495
- Time zone: ACST (UTC+9:30)
  - Summer (DST): ACST (UTC+10:30)
- Location: 209 km (130 mi) north of Adelaide city centre; 9.5 km (6 mi) northeast of Port Pirie
- LGA(s): District Council of Mount Remarkable
- State electorate(s): Stuart
- Federal division(s): Grey
Mean max temp	Mean min temp	Annual rainfall
22.7 °C; 73 °F	9.3 °C; 49 °F	473.3 mm 18.6 in
Suburbs around Weeroona Island:
Germein Bay (body of water)	Germein Bay	Germein Bay
Germein Bay (body of water)	Weeroona Island	Germein Bay
Germein Bay (body of water)	Germein Bay	Germein Bay
- Footnotes: Coordinates; Locations; Climate; Adjoining localities

Weeroona Island (formerly known as Port Flinders) is a locality in the Australian state of South Australia about 209 kilometres (130 miles) north of the state capital of Adelaide and about 9.5 kilometres (5.9 mi) northeast of the city of Port Pirie. At the 2021 census, Weeroona Island recorded a population of 117.

Weeroona Island began as a private subdivision of land in the Hundreds of Pirie and Telowie. The subdivision was originally named “Port Flinders” by its proponents, the Trustees of the Mount Remarkable Mining Company, in about 1853. The name was subsequently replaced by other names including Price Nob, Benjamin Hill and Weeroona Island, and was officially reinstated by the Geographical Names Advisory Committee in 1993. Boundaries were created for the locality in March 1997 and included the Weeroona Island Shack Site. The locality’s name was changed to Weeroona Island in November 2013 following a display of “strong support from residents”. The name “Weeroona Island” is derived from the name of a holiday camp operated by BHP on the coastline of a bay (now known as Weeroona Bay) located near Point Lowly on the eastern coast of Eyre Peninsula.

The locality consists of an outcrop of land which is surrounded by low lying land that can be subject to inundation at high tide and which is connected to the Augusta Highway in the east by a causeway.

Land use within the locality consists of residential use and conservation. The former use consists of both permanent residence and ‘recreational housing’ located on the high ground while latter use is concerned with the low-lying land where built development is required to be minimal and limited to “low-intensity recreational uses” and where provided, should complement the environment of the locality.

Weeroona Island is located within the federal division of Grey, the state electoral district of Stuart and the local government area of the District Council of Mount Remarkable.
