= James Shaw (artist) =

Australian artist (1815–1881)

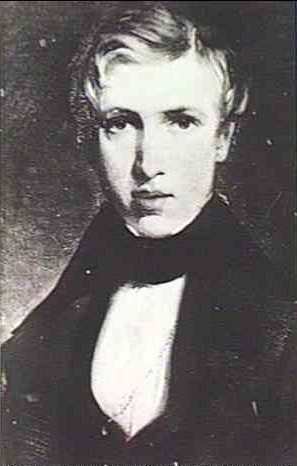
- Born: 1815; Dumfries
- Died: 1881; South Australia
- Occupation: Painter

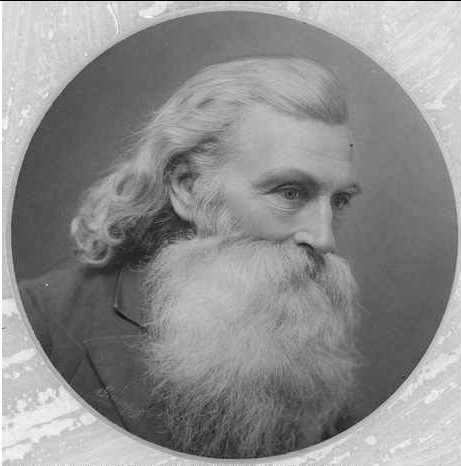
1875

James Shaw (12 January 1815 – 1 September 1881) was a Scottish painter, photographer, engraver, lithographer, surveyor, and lawyer. He was also an early colonist of South Australia.

== Biography ==
Shaw was born on 12 January 1815 at Dumfries, Scotland to James and Isabella Shaw. His father was a clerk and proofreader who painted for pleasure, and his brother George Baird Shaw.

Shaw went to Edinburgh Royal High School, and then studied law at the University of Edinburgh.

In September 1836, sponsored by Justice Thomas McCornock, he left Edinburgh for Jamaica to be a bookkeeper. He painted in his free time. When people realised his talent, they started to ask him for commissions. In 1841, he became a surveyor and began taking portrait commissions.

In 1847, Shaw learned photography and became a photographer.

He married Janet Liddle Paterson on 5 July 1850. Together, they moved to Adelaide in the colony of South Australia. Janet died suddenly in 1868 aged 41, and he raised their six children alone after that. At some point he lived at 17 Wellington Street, Kensington, in a former pub which had been converted into a dwelling.

In 1857, he showed some of his paintings at the first exhibition of the South Australian Society of Arts, of which he was a founding member. He received an honourable mention. He continued to paint and exhibit his works until 1871.

Shaw produced two paintings of the ship Admella, which are held in the Art Gallery of South Australia: the first shows the intact ship, painted in 1858, and the second, a dramatic imagining of the ship getting wrecked on a reef at Cape Banks in 1859.

== Artworks ==
The Art Gallery of South Australia holds the major collection of his work.

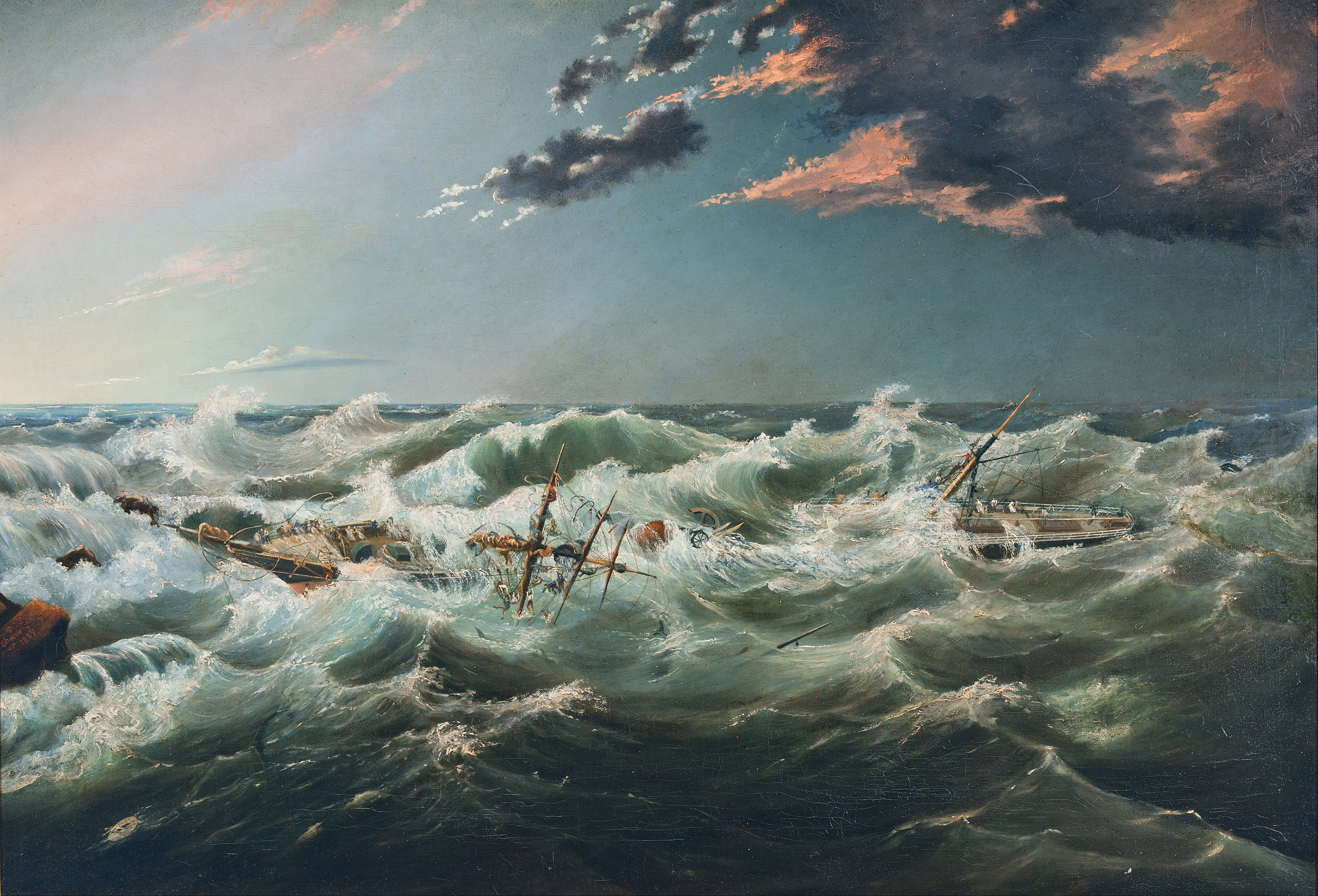
The Admella wrecked, Cape Banks, 6th August, 1859

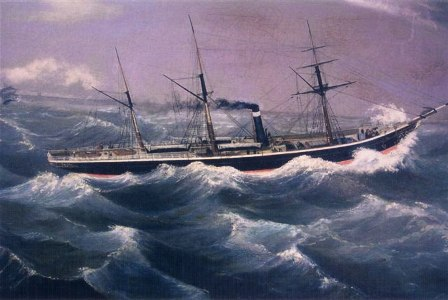
SS Admella, 1858 - oil on canvas

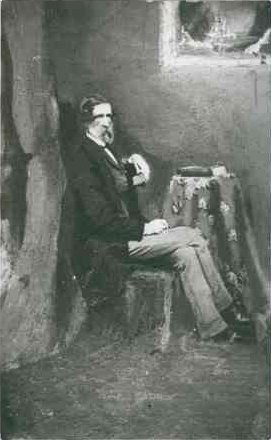
Photograph copied from a portrait painted in Adelaide in approximately 1875. "The Drifting Wreck" can be seen hanging on the wall".
