= Wapma Thura–Southern Flinders Ranges National Park =

National park in South Australia

- IUCN category II (national park)
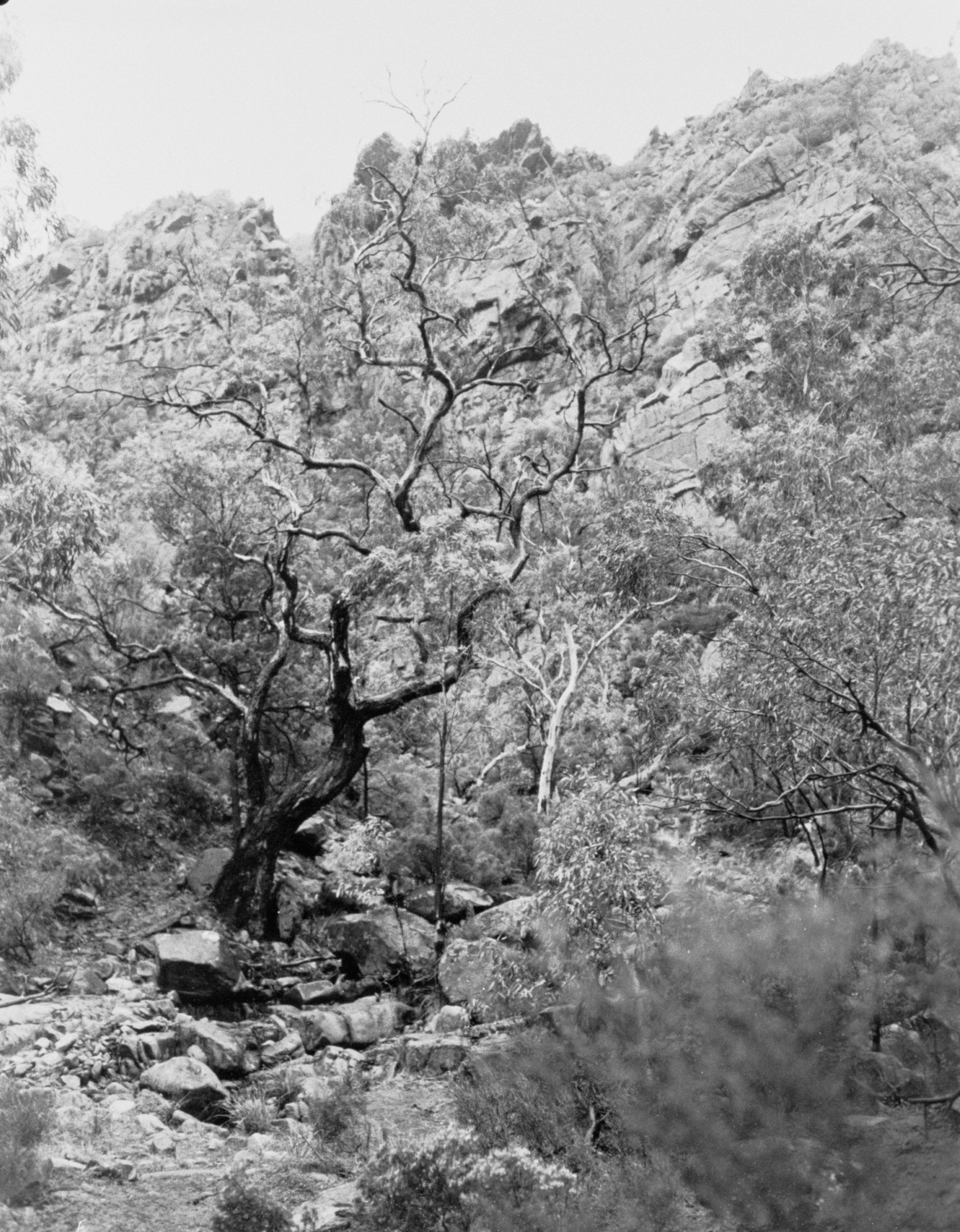
- Telowie Gorge

- Location within South Australia
- Location: South Australia
- Coordinates: 33°2′20.4″S 138°7′29.27″E
- Established: 25 November 2021
- Governing body: National Parks and Wildlife Service South Australia

Wapma Thura–Southern Flinders Ranges National Park is a protected area in the southern Flinders Ranges in South Australia, proclaimed on 25 November 2021. The area comprises several former conservation parks.

== History ==
Proclaimed a national park on 26 November 2021, the area comprises the former Telowie Gorge Conservation Park, Wirrabara Range Conservation Park, Spaniards Gully Conservation Park and a separate portion of Mount Remarkable National Park known as the Napperby Block.

=== Former protected areas ===
The Napperby Block, formerly within Mount Remarkable Conservation Park, is a parcel of land of 16.72 km^{2} (6.46 sq mi), located immediately east of the town of Napperby, about 4 km (2.5 mi) south of the Telowie Gorge Conservation Park and about 12 km (7.5 mi) north-east of the city of Port Pirie. Added in 1993, it is not contiguous with the rest of the Mount Remarkable Park, which is north of Telowie Gorge. It covers 1,672 ha (4,130 acres), and includes the ridge and steep western slopes of the Southern Flinders Ranges.

Spaniards Gully Conservation Park was proclaimed on 5 December 2017, made up of two allotments in the Hundred of Darling, County of Frome, under section 30(1) of the National Parks and Wildlife Act 1972. Its area was (and is) physically separate from the other former conservation parks, lying to the south of Wirrabara.

Telowie Gorge Conservation Park was proclaimed under the National Parks and Wildlife Act 1972 in 1972 in respect to an area of land already under statutory protection since 1970 as the Telowie Gorge National Park. Its extent lies adjacent to Wirrabara, to the west.

Wirrabara Conservation Park was originally created as a native forest reserve in 1950, but was proclaimed a conservation park on 5 December 2017. It lay east of Telowie Gorge, with its south-western corner close to Mount Remarkable Conservation Park's north-eastern corner.

=== Southern Flinders Precinct ===
The Remarkable Southern Flinders Project, created in 2020 as part of the South Australian Government's Parks 2025 strategy, funded by the federal and SA governments, was designed to create an adventure tourism destination for the regions, by investing $10 million in new mountain bike and hiking trails and other tourist facilities in the Southern Flinders Ranges. The schedule extends into 2022.

The project was part of the planning for a new national park, and involved the traditional owners, the Nukunu Nation, who would also co-manage the Telowie Gorge Conservation Park within the precinct.

== Governance ==
The park is managed by the National Parks and Wildlife Service South Australia, which is part of the Department for Environment and Water, in collaboration with Nukunu traditional custodians.

== Description ==
Wapma Thura, the local Aboriginal people's co-name for the new park, means "Snake People". The Wapma (snake) is an important totem for the Nukunu people and shows their significant connection to each other and the Dreamtime serpent.
