= Cape Northumberland (South Australia) =

Cape Northumberland Port MacDonnell, South Australia
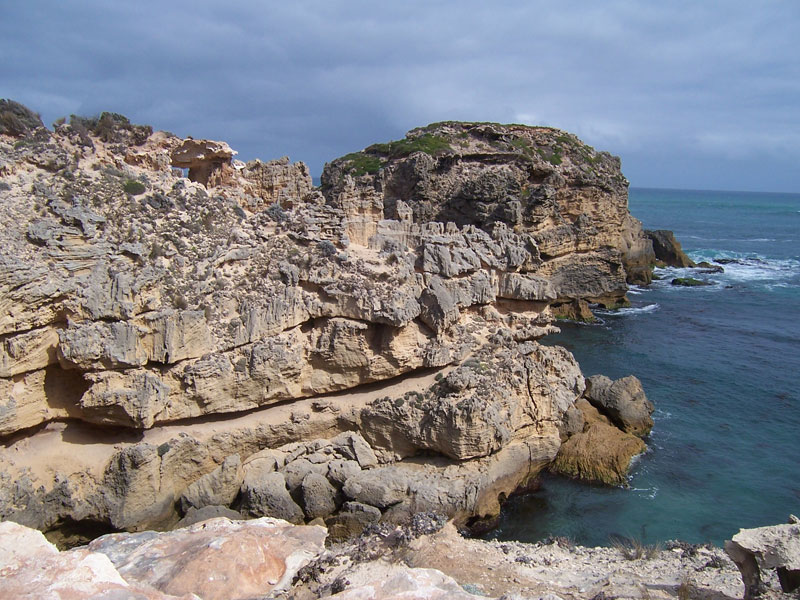
- Cape Northumberland, from the west

- Coordinates: 38°03′46″S 140°39′41″E
- Elevation: 30 m (98 ft)
- Location: 393 km (244 mi) southeast of Adelaide; 28 km (17 mi) southeast of Mount Gambier
- Footnotes: Locations

Cape Northumberland is a headland in the southeast of the Australian state of South Australia. It is the southernmost point of South Australia. It is located about 3 kilometres (1.9 mi) from the town of Port MacDonnell, 28 kilometres south southwest from the municipal seat of Mount Gambier and about 393 kilometres (244 mi) southeast of the state's capital Adelaide.

== History ==
Cape Northumberland was named after Hugh Percy, Duke of Northumberland, by the Royal Navy officer, James Grant, on 3 December 1800, when he was mapping the southern coast of Australia aboard HMS Lady Nelson. The cape is the site of the historic Cape Northumberland Lighthouse, built in 1858. Because it was being undermined by the sea, a new lighthouse was constructed in 1882, about 700 metres (2,300 ft) further inland. The position of original lighthouse is marked by a monument.

== Geography ==
The cape is located on the southeast coast of South Australia. It is the western end of Discovery Bay and its subsidiary, MacDonnell Bay. The cape was described in 2017 in an American source as being "about 30 metres (98 ft) high, is rugged and cliffy, with a hill rising to an elevation of 41 metres (135 ft) behind it. It is the southernmost point on the South Australian coastline.

Climate

Climate data for Cape Northumberland (1864-2006)
Month	Jan	Feb	Mar	Apr	May	Jun	Jul	Aug	Sep	Oct	Nov	Dec	Year
Record high °C (°F)	42.0 (107.6)	43.2 (109.8)	41.4 (106.5)	34.5 (94.1)	27.9 (82.2)	22.3 (72.1)	21.0 (69.8)	25.1 (77.2)	32.3 (90.1)	33.8 (92.8)	41.8 (107.2)	41.2 (106.2)	43.2 (109.8)
Mean daily maximum °C (°F)	21.7 (71.1)	21.9 (71.4)	20.6 (69.1)	18.8 (65.8)	16.4 (61.5)	14.5 (58.1)	13.8 (56.8)	14.5 (58.1)	15.8 (60.4)	17.4 (63.3)	18.9 (66.0)	20.3 (68.5)	17.9 (64.2)
Mean daily minimum °C (°F)	13.6 (56.5)	13.9 (57.0)	12.8 (55.0)	10.9 (51.6)	9.1 (48.4)	7.6 (45.7)	6.7 (44.1)	7.1 (44.8)	8.1 (46.6)	9.3 (48.7)	10.8 (51.4)	12.3 (54.1)	10.2 (50.4)
Record low °C (°F)	5.1 (41.2)	5.4 (41.7)	4.5 (40.1)	2.4 (36.3)	1.0 (33.8)	−1.0 (30.2)	−2.4 (27.7)	−1.2 (29.8)	−0.4 (31.3)	1.5 (34.7)	1.0 (33.8)	3.6 (38.5)	−2.4 (27.7)
Average rainfall mm (inches)	25.4 (1.00)	24.8 (0.98)	31.6 (1.24)	55.0 (2.17)	77.6 (3.06)	97.7 (3.85)	104.5 (4.11)	94.7 (3.73)	66.7 (2.63)	52.2 (2.06)	38.4 (1.51)	34.6 (1.36)	706.3 (27.81)
Average rainy days (≥ 1 mm)	7.8	6.8	9.8	13.8	17.7	19.5	21.4	20.7	17.7	15.2	11.4	10.0	171.8
Average afternoon relative humidity (%)	73	73	75	74	77	79	78	75	75	74	73	75	75
Source: Bureau of Meteorology.

== Gallery ==
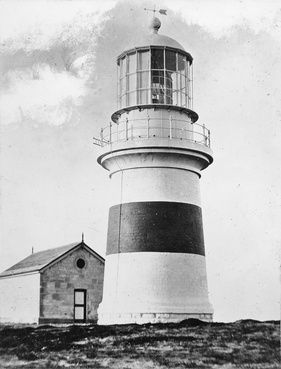
The first Cape Northumberland Lighthouse

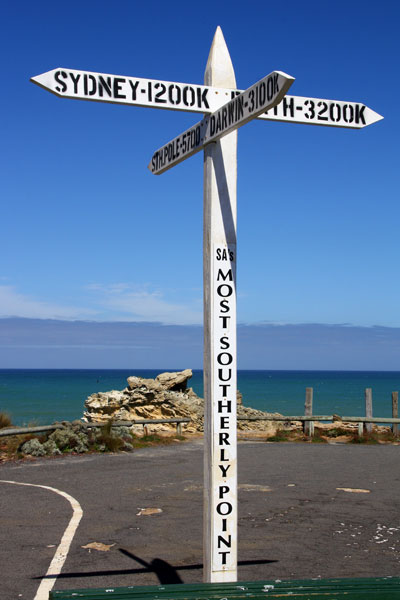
The sign at Cape Northumberland, marking South Australia's southernmost point

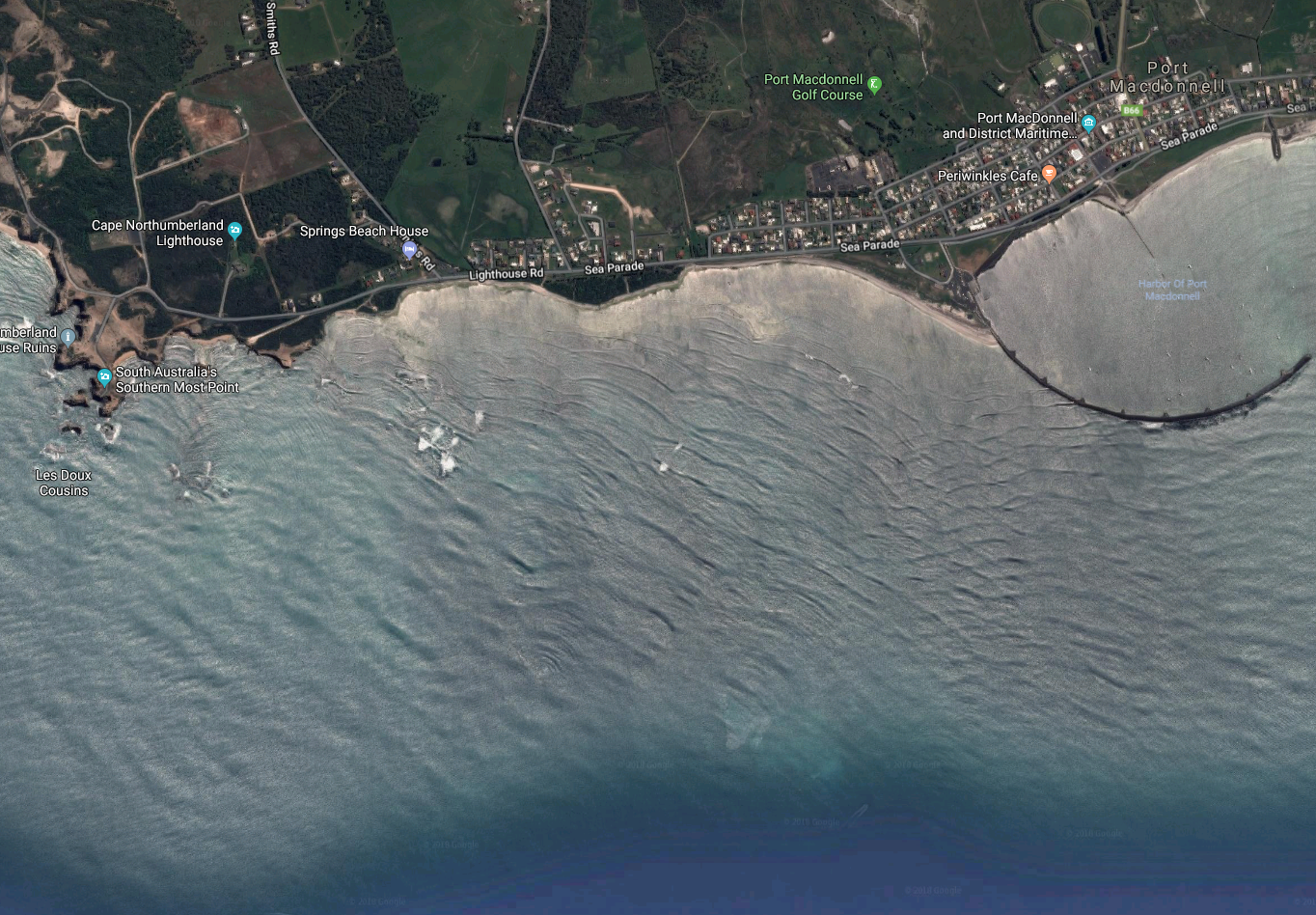
A satellite image of Cape Northumberland (left) showing its relationship to the coastline to its immediate east including the James Corcoran Breakwater
