= Riverland Mallee Important Bird Area =

Important Bird Area in Australia

Coordinates: 33°26′52″S 140°52′56″E

Location of the Riverland Mallee Important Bird Area in South Australia

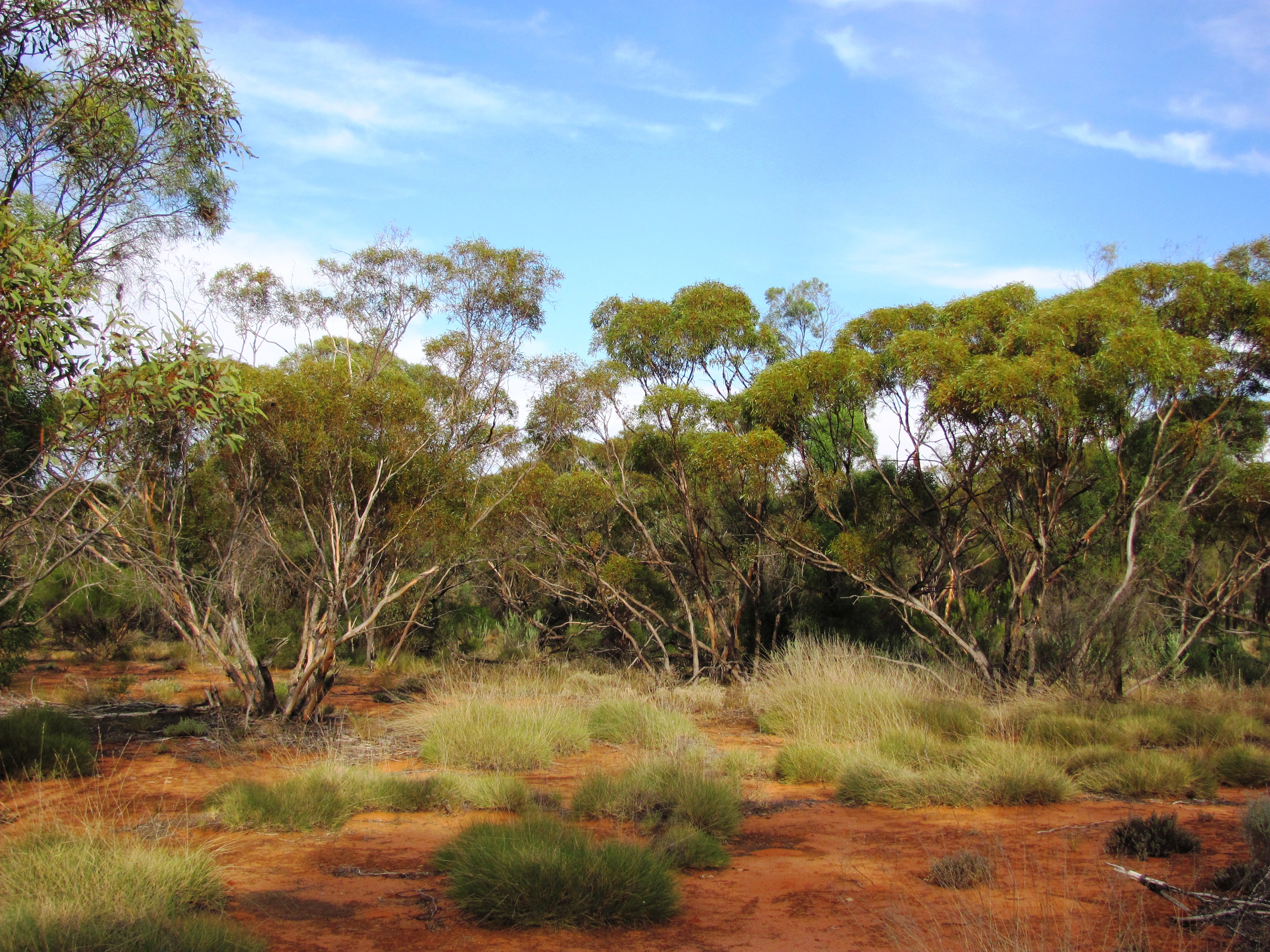
Mallee woodland at Gluepot Reserve

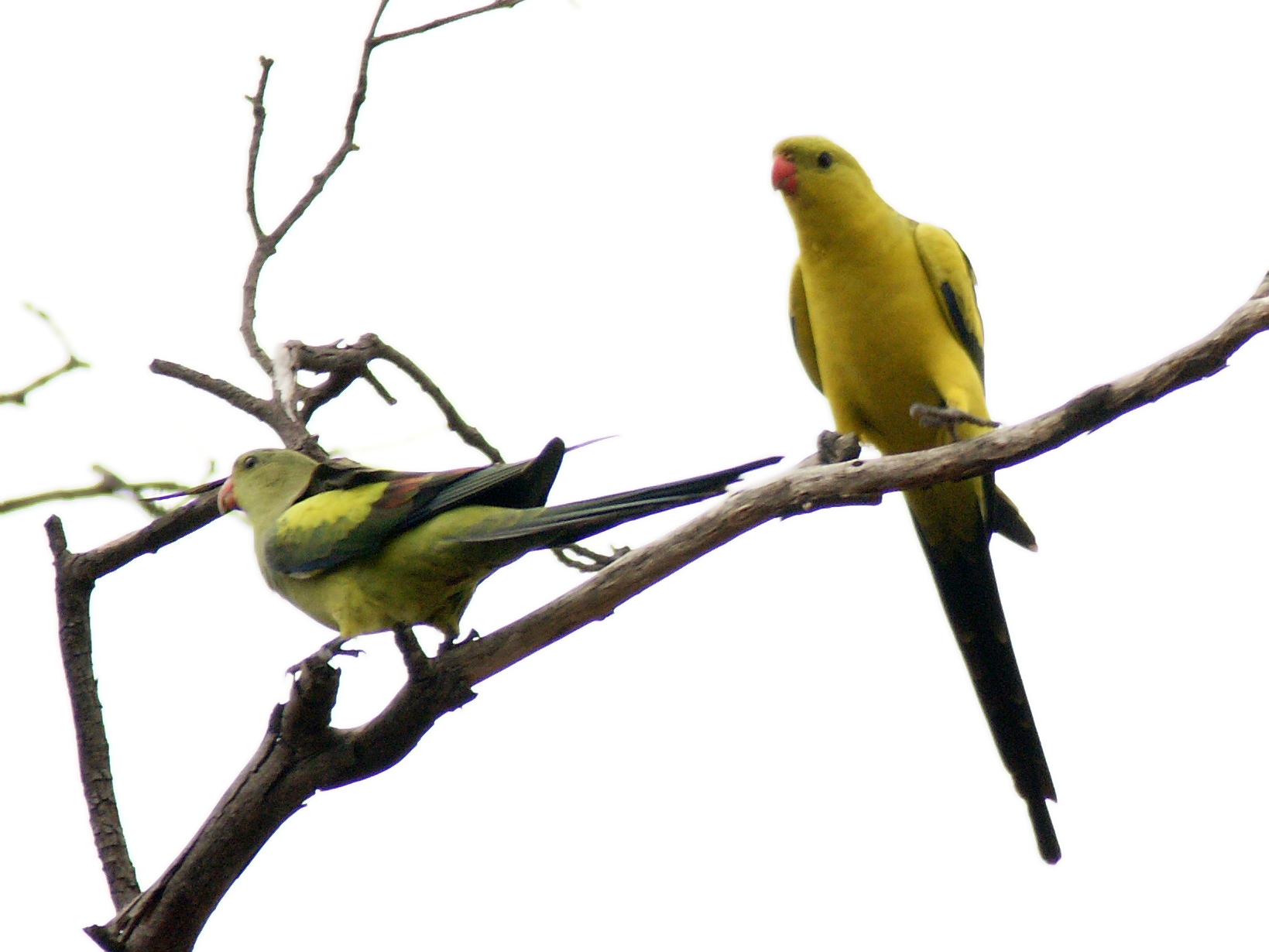
The IBA is an important site for regent parrots

The Riverland Mallee Important Bird Area comprises a 12,200 square kilometres (4,700 square miles) tract of mallee habitat and riverine woodland extending from near Waikerie in the Riverland region in eastern South Australia north-eastwards into south-western New South Wales.

== Description ==
The extent of the Important Bird Area (IBA) in South Australia includes the Riverland Biosphere Reserve, pastoral leases, privately held conservation reserves such the Gluepot Reserve and protected areas declared by statute. In New South Wales it includes Scotia Sanctuary as well as several areas of uncleared native vegetation. Wetlands within the extent of the IBA are Lake Merreti, Hart Lagoon and Stockyard Plains. Threats include inappropriate fire regimes, fox predation, and grazing by feral and domestic herbivores.

== Criteria for nomination as an IBA ==
The site has been identified by BirdLife International as an IBA because it supports the largest population of the critically endangered black-eared miner as well as populations of malleefowl, bush stone-curlews, red-lored whistlers, regent parrots, striated grasswrens, shy heathwrens, southern scrub-robins, hooded robins, chestnut quail-thrushes and purple-gaped honeyeaters. Ephemeral wetlands support large numbers of sharp-tailed sandpipers and freckled ducks when water conditions are suitable. Riverine woodlands along the Murray River have high densities of breeding regent parrots.

== Associated protected areas in South Australia ==
While the IBA has no statutory status in South Australia, it does overlap the following protected areas declared by the South Australian government:

- Conservation parks: Cooltong, Danggali, Kapunda Island, Maize Island, Media Island, Morgan, Pike River, Pooginook, Ramco Point, Rilli Island and White Dam.
- Game reserves - Chowilla, Loch Luna and Moorook
- Regional reserves - Chowilla
- National parks - Murray River
- Wilderness protection area: Danggali

== See also ==
- Central NSW Mallee Important Bird Area
- Southern NSW Mallee Important Bird Area
- List of birds of South Australia
