= Chowilla =

Chowilla may refer to:

- Chowilla, South Australia, a locality
- Chowilla Dam, a cancelled dam project in Australia
- Chowilla floodplain, a flood plain in South Australia
- Chowilla Game Reserve, a protected area in South Australia
- Chowilla Regional Reserve, a protected area in South Australia
