= Danggali =

Danggali may refer to:

- Danggali Conservation Park, a protected area in South Australia
- Danggali, South Australia, a locality
- Danggali Wilderness Protection Area, a protected area in South Australia
- Danggali people
  - Danggali language
