= Katarapko =

Katarapko may refer to any of the following places in South Australia:

- Hundred of Katarapko, a cadastral unit (former division)
- Katarapko, one of six sections of the Murray River National Park
- Katarapko, South Australia, a locality in the Riverland
- Katarapko Game Reserve, a former protected area, part of the Murray River National Park since June 1991
- Katarapko Island, an island within the Murray River in South Australia

== See also ==
- Katarapko Wood Camp, a World War II prisoner-of-war camp for Italian prisoners, on Katarapko Island
