= Cooltong =

Cooltong is a local name north west of Renmark in South Australia. It may refer to

- Cooltong, South Australia, a town
- Cooltong Conservation Park

and several other geographic and cultural features.
