= Chowilla Dam =

- Location of the proposed Chowilla Dam
- Country: Australia
- Location: 60 kilometres (37 mi) upstream of Renmark, South Australia
- Coordinates: 33°58′15.6″S 140°53′41.1″E
- Status: Cancelled
- Construction began: 1963
- Demolition date: 1970
- Construction cost: A$68 million

Dam and spillways
- Type of dam: Embankment dam
- Impounds: Murray River
- Height (foundation): 41 feet (12 m)
- Length: 3.3 miles (5.3 km)
- Spillways: 18

Reservoir
- Surface area: 1372 km^{2}
- Maximum length: 55 miles (89 km)
- Maximum width: 20 miles (32 km)
- Maximum water depth: 55 feet (17 m)

Chowilla Dam was a proposed water storage reservoir on the Murray River in the 1960s. The dam wall would have been in South Australia, but the reservoir behind it would have stretched upstream into Victoria and New South Wales. The site was selected in 1960. Early preparations for its construction were conducted before the project was halted. These included a 23 km service railway from the Barmera railway line, which was dismantled without ever being used.

== Purpose ==
The dam was proposed to provide flood regulation and reliable water supplies for South Australia, which pumps water from the lower Murray through pipelines across the Mount Lofty Ranges to Adelaide, and parts of the Mid North, Yorke Peninsula and Eyre Peninsula. It was announced on 21 April 1960 by Tom Playford, the Premier of South Australia.

== Cross border agreement ==
It had been agreed by the River Murray Commission in September 1961 and governments of South Australia, Victoria, New South Wales and Australia in 1963. A preliminary meeting was held on 16 April 1962 to start discussion on Chowilla Dam. Participants in that meeting were Prime Minister of Australia Robert Menzies, Premier of South Australia Tom Playford, Premier of Victoria, Deputy Premier of New South Wales and Minister for Development Jack Renshaw, Treasurer of Australia Harold Holt, Minister for National Development Bill Spooner. The follow-up meeting at which an agreement was reached was held on 19 November 1962. Participants were Spooner (also President of the River Murray Commission) and Menzies for the Commonwealth, Renshaw and George Enticknap for NSW, Premier of Victoria Henry Bolte and Premier of South Australia Thomas Playford. The four governments would share the costs evenly, but the Commonwealth would extend a loan for the New South Wales component in exchange for water from the Menindee Lakes during construction.

== Reservoir ==
The reservoir would have been 55 miles (89 km) long and up to 20 miles (32 km) wide with a surface area of 530 square miles (1,400 km^{2}) due to the flat terrain. The dam wall would have been 18,000 feet (5,500 m) long and the reservoir depth up to 55 feet (17 m) with a capacity of 5.06 million acre-feet (6,240 Gl). The reservoir would have been approximately 45 square miles (120 km^{2}) in South Australia, 160 square miles (410 km^{2}) in Victoria and 195 square miles (510 km^{2}) in New South Wales.

== Engineering ==
The dam was proposed to be an earth embankment up to 50 feet (15 m) high and 18,000 feet (5,500 m) long. It was to include a concrete spillway 800 feet (240 m) long, as well as a navigation lock. In later versions of the plan, the lock was removed to save cost. The embankment would block the Murray River, as well as both Chowilla Creek and Monoman Creek in the Chowilla floodplain. Most of the impervious core and the compacted sand shoulders of the dam embankment were to be sourced from local materials of specific layers of soil. There was also going to be an 80 foot (24 m)-deep cut-off wall under the concrete spillway and a lock to reduce seepage.

The plan to deal with the highly saline groundwater was to drill relief wells and drains, and pump the saline water to evaporation ponds several miles away. That was similar to what had been done previously at several points along the Murray in what were known as "salt interception schemes". Rock would need to be transported from further away to provide protective riprap, filters, and aggregate in concrete, as well as bituminous membrane, which would be transported by rail from 150 miles (240 km) away.

The South Australian Railways was engaged to transport the required rock. A 17-mile (27 km) railway line was built, branching from the Barmera line 5 miles (8 km) north of Yamba. Sixty FCD-class flatcars were constructed by the Islington Railway Workshops to carry skips that could be taken off the train by crane to move the rock to where it was required. A siding to collect the stone was built between Murray Bridge and Monarto South, near Kinchina Quarry. When the project was cancelled, the branch line had been completed, except for the laying of ballast and the terminal siding. Work to remove the line began in September 1972, and the rails were used to upgrade the Waikerie line.

== Controversy ==
The dam and reservoir would have flooded the wetlands in what is now the Chowilla Game Reserve, Chowilla Regional Reserve and northern edge of the Murray-Sunset National Park and potentially raised salinity in the Riverland and lower Murray as the reservoir would have been quite shallow in a hot dry climate.

The dam was first proposed and announced in 1960 by Tom Playford, the Liberal and Country League premier of South Australia. Playford's government had been in office since 1938, and through that time had presided over significant economic and infrastructure development in the state. That had included encouraging new industries, establishing satellite cities around Adelaide, nationalising the electricity generators, and stimulating self-sufficiency by using Leigh Creek brown coal instead of importing black coal from interstate. The Chowilla Dam would have continued that theme by providing greater certainty and control over water supplies as Adelaide's water requirements were increasing.

Playford and the LCL won the 1962 state election, but only with the support of independent Tom Stott in an otherwise-hung parliament. Stott was a strong supporter of building the dam, which would be in his electorate. The Frank Walsh-led Australian Labor Party won the 1965 election. After leadership changes in both parties, the LCL led by Steele Hall defeated the ALP led by Don Dunstan in the 1968 election, again with the support of Stott.

Hall became convinced that the Chowilla Dam was not a good idea and favoured agreements for water supply from Dartmouth Dam in Victoria instead. That was due to a combination of the increasing cost estimates for building the dam, and the increasing awareness of its environmental impacts. Because Stott still believed that the dam would be valuable in his electorate, and with local community opinion mostly in its favour, he switched his support from Hall to Dunstan (who supported both the Chowilla and Dartmouth Dams), resulting in the 1970 election, which returned the ALP with a majority to govern in its own right (27 out of 47 seats).

Chowilla was one of the first instances of a campaign in which there was strong advocacy for environmental protection. The Sunraysia Salinity Committee opposed the dam because it believed that the combination of high evaporation and saline groundwater would lead to increased salinity downstream which would be harmful to horticulture. The future salinity concerns were raised in contrast to the local economic benefits to be brought by the construction project. The Victorian government was the first to change from supporting to opposing the project.

== Cancellation ==
The Dartmouth Dam was built on the Mitta Mitta River (a tributary of the Murray) in the 1970s. There are agreements in place to assure South Australia of a supply of water, and management to control the flow, because it takes six weeks for water from Dartmouth Dam to reach South Australia. Lake Victoria in southwestern New South Wales, on an anabranch of the Murray, provides closer guaranteed supply and is operated by South Australian water authorities.
