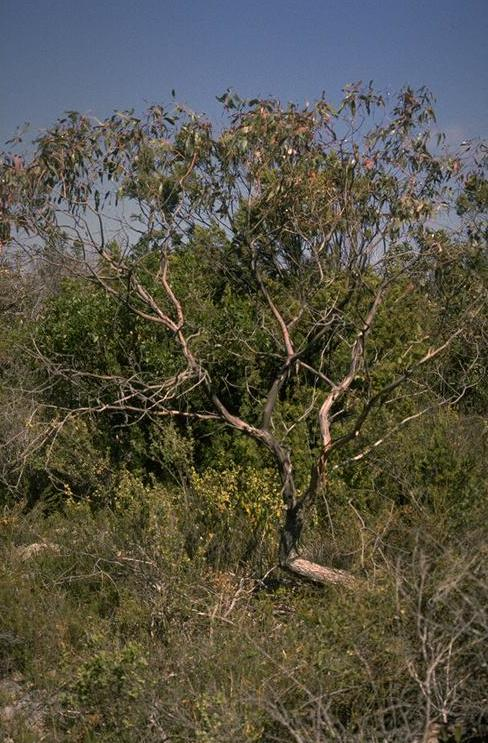

Conservation status
- Endangered (IUCN 3.1)

Scientific classification
- Kingdom: Plantae
- Clade: Tracheophytes
- Clade: Angiosperms
- Clade: Eudicots
- Clade: Rosids
- Order: Myrtales
- Family: Myrtaceae
- Genus: Eucalyptus
- Species: E. arcana

Binomial name
- Eucalyptus arcana (Nicolle & Brooker) K.Rule

Synonyms
- Eucalyptus splendens subsp. arcana Nicolle & Brooker

= Eucalyptus arcana =

Mallee manna gum

Species of eucalyptus

Eucalyptus arcana, commonly known as the Mallee manna gum or Carpenter Rocks gum is a mallee that is endemic to South Australia. It has rough bark from the base of the trunk to the thinnest branches, lance-shaped, sometimes curved leaves, flower buds in groups of seven, white flowers and hemispherical fruit. It is only known from a single population near Carpenter Rocks.

== Description ==
Eucalyptus arcana is a low, straggly tree, sometimes with several stems, that typically grows to 6 metres (20 ft) high. It has rough, fibrous, grey to grey-brown bark from the base of the trunk to the larger branches, and smooth, grey to cream bark on the thinnest branches. Young plants and coppice regrowth have four-sided stems and glossy elliptic to egg-shaped leaves 45–120 millimetres (1.8–4.7 in) long and 13–55 mm (0.5–2.2 in) wide with wavy edges. Adult leaves are lance-shaped, the same glossy green on both sides, with a blade that is 80–150 millimetres (3.1–5.9 in) long and 17–30 mm (0.7–1.2 in) wide on a petiole 10–28 mm (0.4–1.1 in) long. The flowers buds are arranged in groups of seven on a peduncle 4–10 mm (0.2–0.4 in) long, the individual flowers on a pedicel up to 2 mm (0.1 in) long. Mature buds are oval to spindle-shaped, 5–7.5 mm (0.20–0.30 in) long and 4–5.5 mm (0.16–0.22 in) wide with an operculum that is shaped like a blunt cone, about equal in length to the floral cup. Flowering occurs in February and the flowers are white. The fruit are hemispherical to cone-shaped, 6–7 mm (0.24–0.28 in) long and 6–8 mm (0.24–0.31 in) wide containing dark brown to black ovoid seeds.

== Taxonomy and naming ==
Mallee manna gum was first formally described in 1998 by Dean Nicolle and Ian Brooker who gave it the name Eucalyptus splendens subsp. arcana and published the description in the Journal of the Adelaide Botanic Gardens. In 2009 Kevin Rule raised it to species status as E. arcana. The specific epithet (arcana) is a Latin word meaning "secret" or "mysterious", referring to the species being hidden in dense scrub.

== Distribution and habitat ==
Eucalyptus arcana has a limited range and occurs on low rises in shallow, impoverished, red clay-loam soils over limestone around the coastal town of Carpenter Rocks in south-east South Australia. It is found amongst dense tall shrubland, associated with species including Eucalyptus obliqua and Eucalyptus ovata. The populations that Nicolle and Brooker described as E. splendens subsp. arcana occurring near Moonlight Head in south-west Victoria have been assessed as a form of E. aromaphloia.

== See also ==
- List of Eucalyptus species
- Carpenter Rocks Conservation Park
