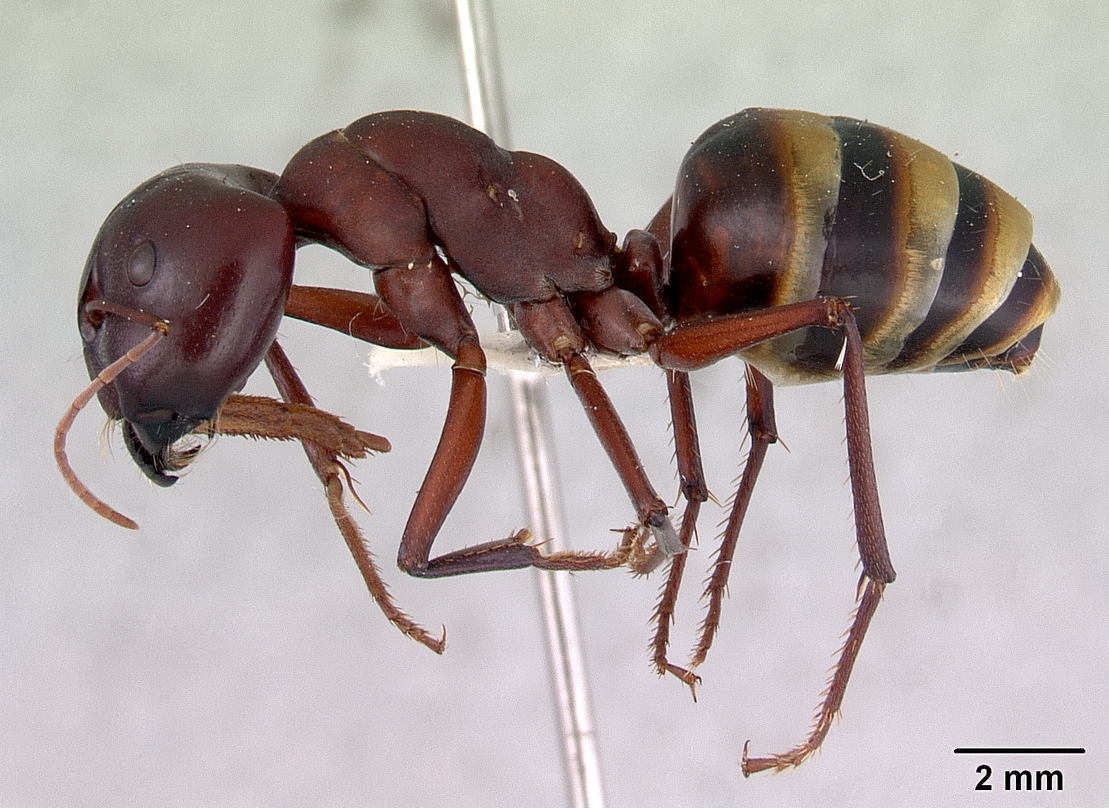
- Camponotus aurocinctus worker

Scientific classification
- Kingdom: Animalia
- Phylum: Arthropoda
- Class: Insecta
- Order: Hymenoptera
- Family: Formicidae
- Subfamily: Formicinae
- Genus: Camponotus
- Subgenus: Myrmosaulus
- Species: C. aurocinctus

Binomial name
- Camponotus aurocinctus (Smith, F., 1858)

Synonyms
- Camponotus midas Froggatt, 1896

= Camponotus aurocinctus =

Species of ant

Camponotus aurocinctus is a species of ant in the genus Camponotus. The ant was described by Smith in 1858.

== Taxonomy ==
Camponotus aurocinctus was first identified by Frederick Smith in 1858, in his Catalogue of hymenopterous insects in the collection of the British Museum part VI. The species currently has one synonym published – Camponotus midas, described by Walter Wilson Froggatt in 1896.

== Distribution ==
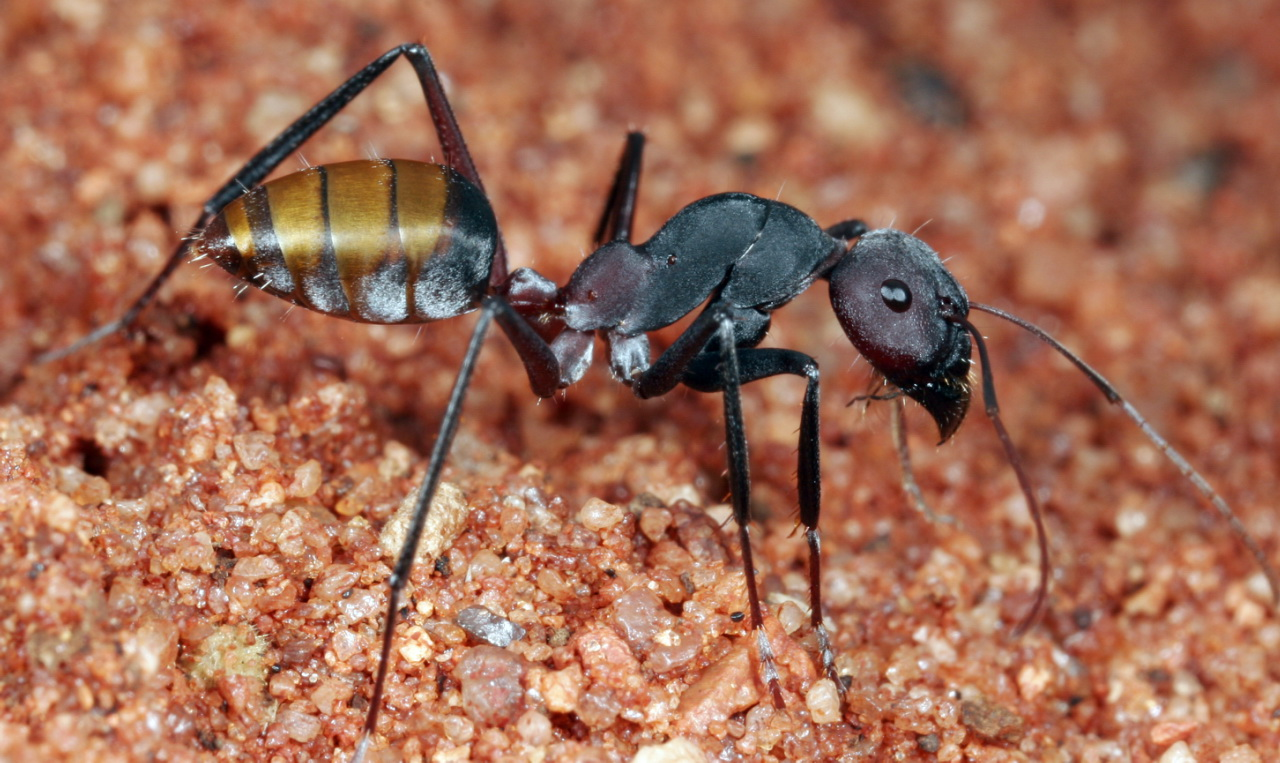
C. aurocinctus worker, with various colours

The species is endemic to Australia, and prefers to nest in ground soil, but colonies have strong preferences for nesting in sandy like soils and is usually more encountered foraging during late day times. Workers observed while foraging are found on low vegetation or on the ground, and have been found Stockyard Plain and Danggali Conservation Park in South Australia.
