= Duck hunting in South Australia =

Duck hunting is an outdoor recreational activity practised under a permit system in the Australian state of South Australia. Hunters use shotguns and are provided with permits issued by the Department of Environment and Water. The activity is opposed by animal welfare groups who consider the practice to be unacceptably cruel.

== Origins ==
Duck hunting using firearms has occurred in South Australia since the formal establishment of the colony in the early 19th century. Since that time, some aboriginal hunters adapted their traditional practice to make use of the newly available firearms. During the 19th and 20th centuries, duck hunting was frequently referred to as "sport" and its participants referred to as "sportsmen"- though the activity has its origins in the obtaining of meat for human consumption. In the colony's "early days" the magpie goose (Anseranas semipalmata) was prized for its meat and was hunted to practical extinction. Several other species have been removed from lists of species permitted to be hunted as their populations have fallen, including Latham's snipe and several species of duck. Duck hunting is considered to be a particularly safe activity (from the hunter's perspective) due to the absence of large predatory animals in South Australia. The greatest risk a hunter faces is posed by fellow hunters and their firearms.

== Species hunted ==
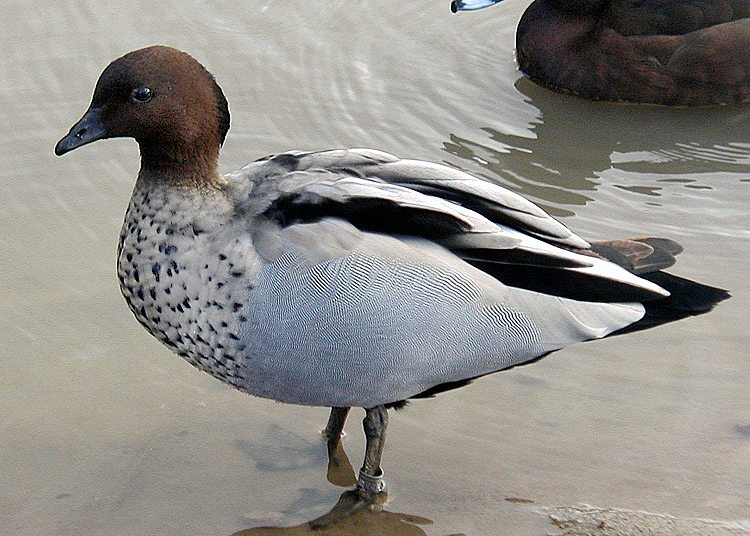
Australian wood duck

As of 2016, the hunting of six native species of ducks is permitted: the Australian wood duck or Maned duck (Chenonetta jubata), Grey teal (Anas gracilis), Chestnut teal (Anas castanea), Pink-eared duck (Malacorhynchus membranaceus), Pacific black duck (Anas superciliosa) and Mountain duck or Australian shelduck (Tadorna tadornoides). The introduced Mallard is also allowed to be hunted.

Species formerly allowed to be hunted include the Australasian shoveler (Anas rhynchotis) and the Hardhead (Aythya (Nyroca) australis). Prior to 1976, Latham's snipe (Gallinago hardwickii) was allowed to be hunted. As of 2016, Latham's snipe and the Australasian shoveler are listed as Rare under the National Parks and Wildlife Act 1972. The Hardhead is listed as Vulnerable under Victorian legislation.

== Season ==
Duck hunting open seasons in South Australia have typically started in February or March and ended in late June. Hunting in game reserves is sometimes only permitted during weekends. In the 1920s, the unusually early opening of the season in December, which overlapped with duck breeding season, became a subject of public controversy. Concerns were raised that parent birds would be killed while their young were still dependent on them, leading to their chicks dying of starvation. In 1946, the season commenced on 14 February and ended on 30 June. In 1982, the season commenced on 27 February and ended on 26 June. In 1992, the season commenced on 14 February and ended on 15 June. In 1948, 400 hunters shot an estimated 3,500 ducks in the Tatiara district in a single morning. In 1954, over 600 hunters attended the season opening in the Naracoorte district, including "hundreds" from the neighbouring state of Victoria.

== Conditions ==
As of 2016, hunters must have passed a Waterfowl Identification Test before being allowed to hunt ducks in South Australia. Ducks are only to be hunted during limited open seasons. The killing of unlisted or protected species is prohibited. Current permits must be carried by hunters at all times while hunting. The pre-feeding of hunting grounds is prohibited as is the taking of eggs of any species. Hunters must not damage vegetation or disturb animals' burrows or nests. Duck shooting is prohibited from moving boats.

=== Bag limits ===
In 1927, a "sportsman" was permitted to shoot 25 ducks per day, and up to 40 quail per day on a single hunting license. A professional license was also available, which allowed a hunter to kill an unlimited number of ducks. At that time, in the neighbouring state of Victoria, the only available license limited each hunter to 15 ducks per day. Recreational hunters were also prohibited from selling hunted ducks commercially. No such sale limitation was in place in South Australia, which allowed for South Australian duck hunters, professional and recreational, to export ducks to Victoria for sale there. Market shooters was considered to be risking populations of ducks being wiped out from some areas in 1928. In 1946, the bag limit was 12 ducks per gun per day. The bag limit was also 12 ducks per hunter per day in 1992, with a further restriction of a maximum of two Australasian shoveller per day.

=== Firearms ===
Only smoothbore shotguns not exceeding 12-gauge using shot pellets no larger than BB (4.1 mm) is allowed. Pump action and self-loading firearms are prohibited unless used on private land. In 1940, duck hunters visiting South Australia from other states were required to register their firearms in South Australia and purchase a gun license for 5 shillings. In 1943, the Commonwealth Government banned duck hunting to conserve ammunition during Australia's involvement in World War II.

=== Game reserves ===
Duck hunting is only authorized to occur during certain days and times in the following South Australian game reserves: Chowilla, Moorook, Loch Luna, Currency Creek, Lake Robe, Mud Islands, Poocher Swamp, Tolderol, Bucks Lake and Bool Lagoon.

== Wounding rates ==
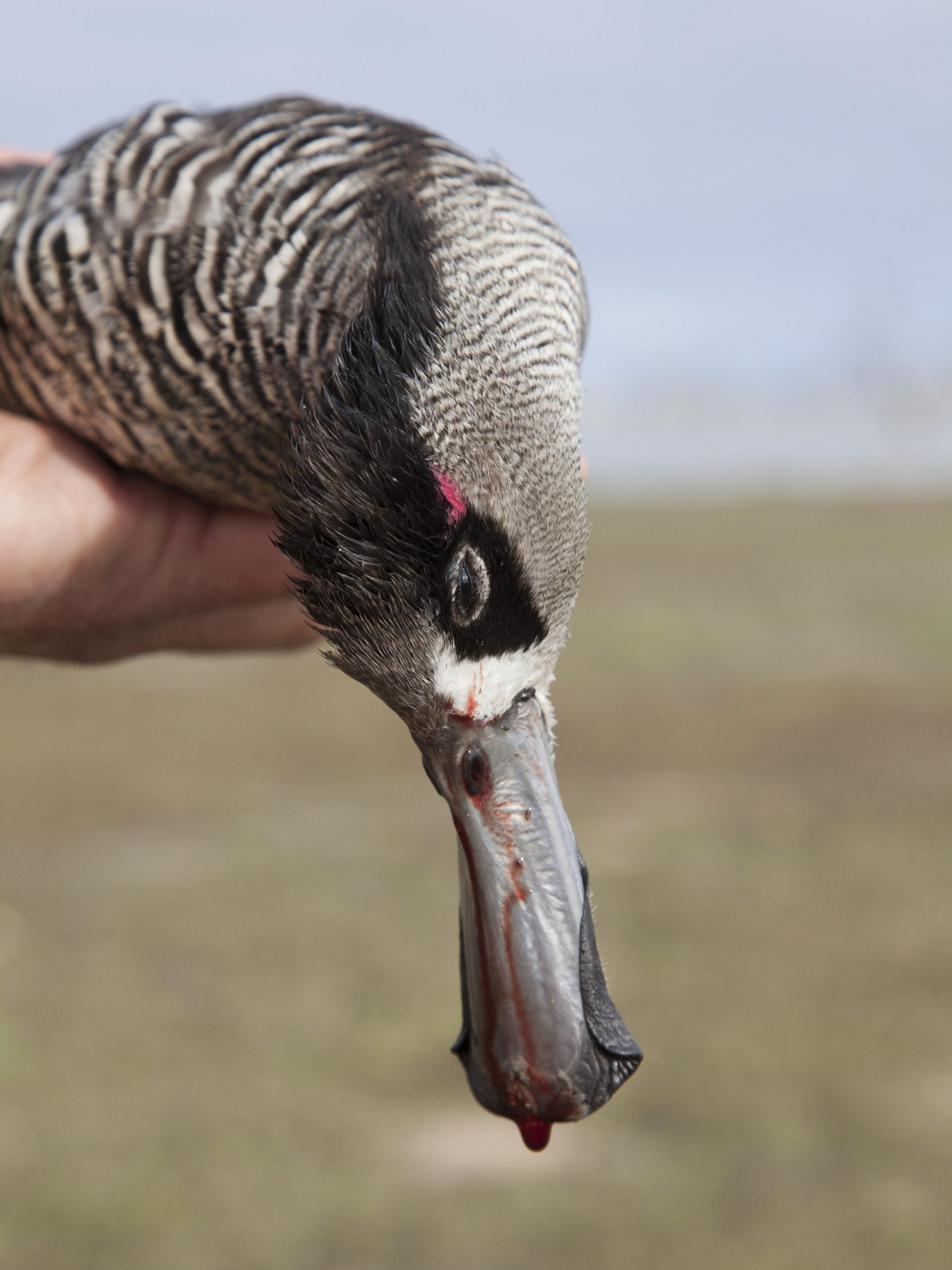
Shot and crippled Pink-eared duck

When hunting with shotguns, there is a risk of accidentally injuring ducks that survive. As ducks often fly in flocks, there is a potential for multiple ducks to be hit when hunters shoot into the flock to target an individual. The duck struck by the central cluster of the shot typically dies and falls to the ground. However, ducks on the periphery of the shot may still be hit by some pellets, which they survive but result in lifelong suffering. Shooting at too far a distance also increases the risk of causing injury due to the increased spread of shot pellets.

A survey conducted in Victoria on hunting four species of native ducks revealed a significant number of injured birds. Some of these birds survive, while others suffer before eventually dying. Approximately 26% of the shot ducks are either wounded or mutilated. Of these, 12% will be wounded and survive, whereas between 14% and 33% will be mutilated. The likely outcome for mutilated birds is a slow, painful death. An X-ray study of ducks caught using nets in Victoria found that between 6% and 19% of the ducks live with embedded shot pellets in their bodies.

Statistics from United States and Scandinavia also shows a significant proportion of crippling losses with shotguns. Remarkably, this significant factor impacting waterfowl populations has been mostly neglected by policymakers and government officials.

== Opposition ==
Objections to the management and practises of duck hunting in South Australia have been expressed publicly since at least the 1920s. In the 1940s, attention was drawn to lax enforcement of a protected area known as Bird Island at Lake Bonney in the south east of the state, and to hunters use of automatic weapons. In 1990, Laurie Levy from Animal Liberation Victoria described South Australia as having some of the most draconian duck hunting laws still in Australia. In the 2010s, organisations opposing duck hunting include: Protect Our Native Ducks (POND), the Royal Society for the Prevention of Cruelty to Animals (RSPCA), the Australian Greens and the Animal Justice Party.
