= List of islands within the Murray River in South Australia =

List of islands within the Murray River in South Australia is a list of islands located within the watercourse of the Murray River within the Australian state of South Australia from the mouth of the river at Encounter Bay in the south to the borders with the states of New South Wales and Victoria in the east including the following lakes located adjacent to the river's mouth - Coorong, Lake Albert and Lake Alexandrina.

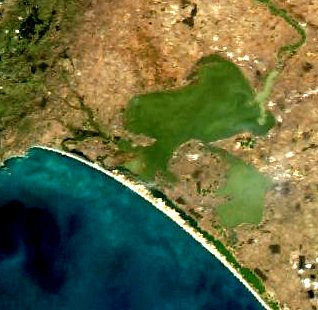
Aerial view of Lakes Albert and Alexandrina

== Coorong ==
The following list includes islands (listed from west to east) in the Coorong as well as the following two channels connecting it to Port Pullen at the Murray Mouth - the Coorong Channel and the Tauwitchere Channel. As of 2014, all of the islands in the following list were within the boundary of the Coorong National Park.

Name	Coordinates	Remarks
Sam Island	35°44′42″S 139°14′31″E	
Needles Island	35°50′39″S 139°21′17″E	
Goat Island	35°50′50″S 139°20′52″E	
Snake Island	35°51′02″S 139°21′57″E	
Rabbit Island	35°51′37″S 139°22′42″E	
Bluff Island	35°53′03″S 139°23′22″E	
Bull Island	35°54′56″S 139°25′18″E	
Cow Island	35°55′52″S 139°27′03″E	
Long Island	35°56′08″S 139°27′27″E	
Round Island	35°56′28″S 139°27′44″E	
Swan Island	35°56′40″S 139°28′09″E	
Stony Well Island	35°57′44″S 139°29′28″E	
Cattle Island	36°00′25″S 139°32′04″E	
Teal Island	36°02′13″S 139°33′30″E	
North Pelican Island	36°02′40″S 139°33′31″E	
Halfway Island	36°03′06″S 139°34′01″E	
Pelican Island	36°03′27″S 139°33′48″E	
Mellor Island	36°04′06″S 139°34′30″E	
Seagull Island	36°05′03″S 139°35′25″E	
Wild Dog Island	36°07′24″S 139°37′41″E	

== Lake Albert ==
Name	Coordinates	Remarks
Bascombe Island	35°43′35″S 139°15′49″E	Island is located in a bay at the south end of the lake also known as Bascombe Bay

== Lake Alexandrina ==
The following is a list of islands (from west to east) within Lake Alexandrina and including the group of islands at the southern end of the lake.

Name	Coordinates	Remarks
Goose Island	35°29′30″S 138°49′53″E	An island that was inundated by the water level rise caused by the construction of the barrages in the 1930s. It lies within the boundaries of the Currency Creek Game Reserve.
Billygoat Islands	35°29′18″S 138°50′11″E	It is reported as being a group of small islands of which many were inundated by the water level rise in the river system caused by the construction of the barrages in the 1930s. It lies within the boundaries of the Currency Creek Game Reserve.
Reedy Island	35°31′53″S 138°50′39″E	Island located in the Goolwa Channel on the south side of Hindmarsh Island within the boundary of the Coorong National Park.
Rushy Island	35°32′08″S 138°50′59″E	Island located in the Goolwa Channel on the south side of Hindmarsh Island within the boundary of the Coorong National Park.
Hindmarsh Island	35°30′58″S 138°52′34″E	
Bird Island	35°33′10″S 138°53′44″E	Island located in the Coorong Channel on the south side of Hindmarsh Island within the boundary of the Coorong National Park. Also, known as Gull Island.
Varcoe Island	35°32′31″S 138°54′04″E	Island located in Mundoo channel between Hindmarsh and Mundoo Islands.,
Lucerne Island	35°31′54″S 138°55′31″E	
Mundoo Island	35°32′47″S 138°56′02″E	
Goose Island	35°30′05″S 138°56′09″E	Island located east of the town of Clayton Bay.
Goat Island	35°30′15″S 138°56′37″E	Island located east of town of Clayton Bay.
Ewe Island	35°33′23″S 138°56′49″E	According to an atlas published in 1877, it and Long Island were considered to be one island known as Reedy Island.
Rat Island	35°31′13″S 138°57′33″E	Also called Ram Island.
Long Island	35°32′15″S 138°59′06″E	Also known as Ram Island and as Grindstone Island. According to an atlas published in 1877, it and Ewe Island were considered to be one island known as Reedy Island.
Tauwitchere Island	35°34′28″S 138°59′22″E	Island is reported as also being named Towagery, Towatchery and Talwadjeri Island and as having an area of 144 hectares (356 acres).
Myrtle Island	35°34′08″S 138°59′32″E	Island located within the Mud Islands Game Reserve.
Snake Island	35°33′41″S 138°59′49″E	
Mud Island	35°33′51″S 139°00′43″E	Island reported as having an area of 17 hectares (43 acres). It lies within the boundaries of the Mud Island Game Reserve.
Reedy Island No 2	35°33′22″S 139°00′43″E	
Pomanda Island	35°24′58″S 139°18′29″E	Island located adjacent of the channel of the Murray River immediately south of its entry into Lake Alexandrina.

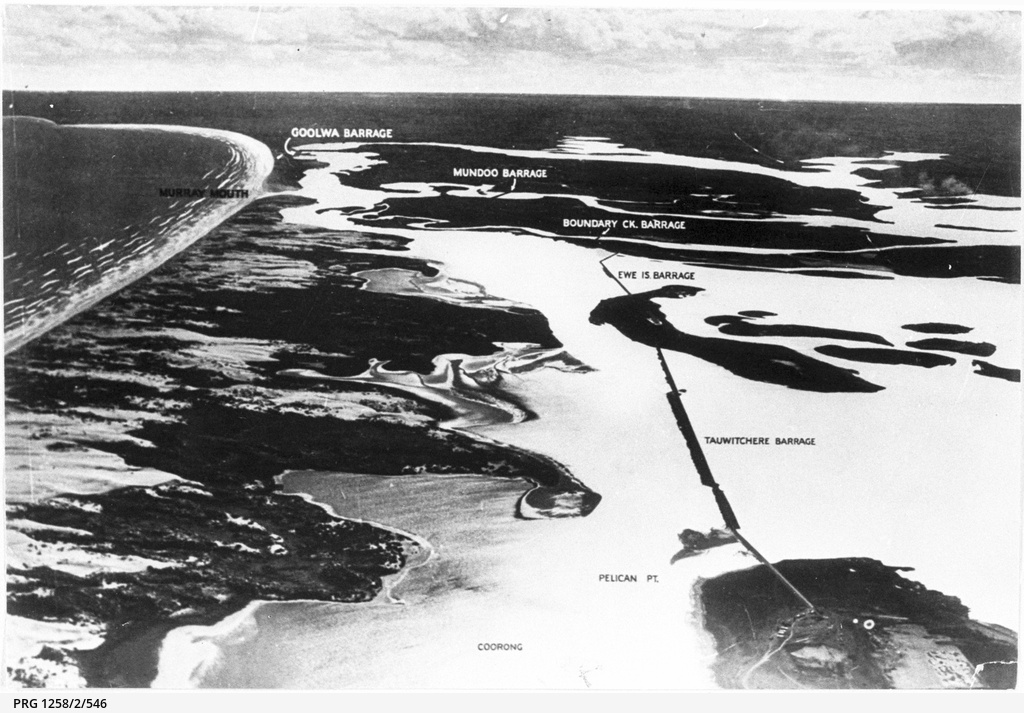
Aerial view from the east showing island system adjoining Murray Mouth including locations of barrages (State Library of South Australia - PRG-1258/2/546)

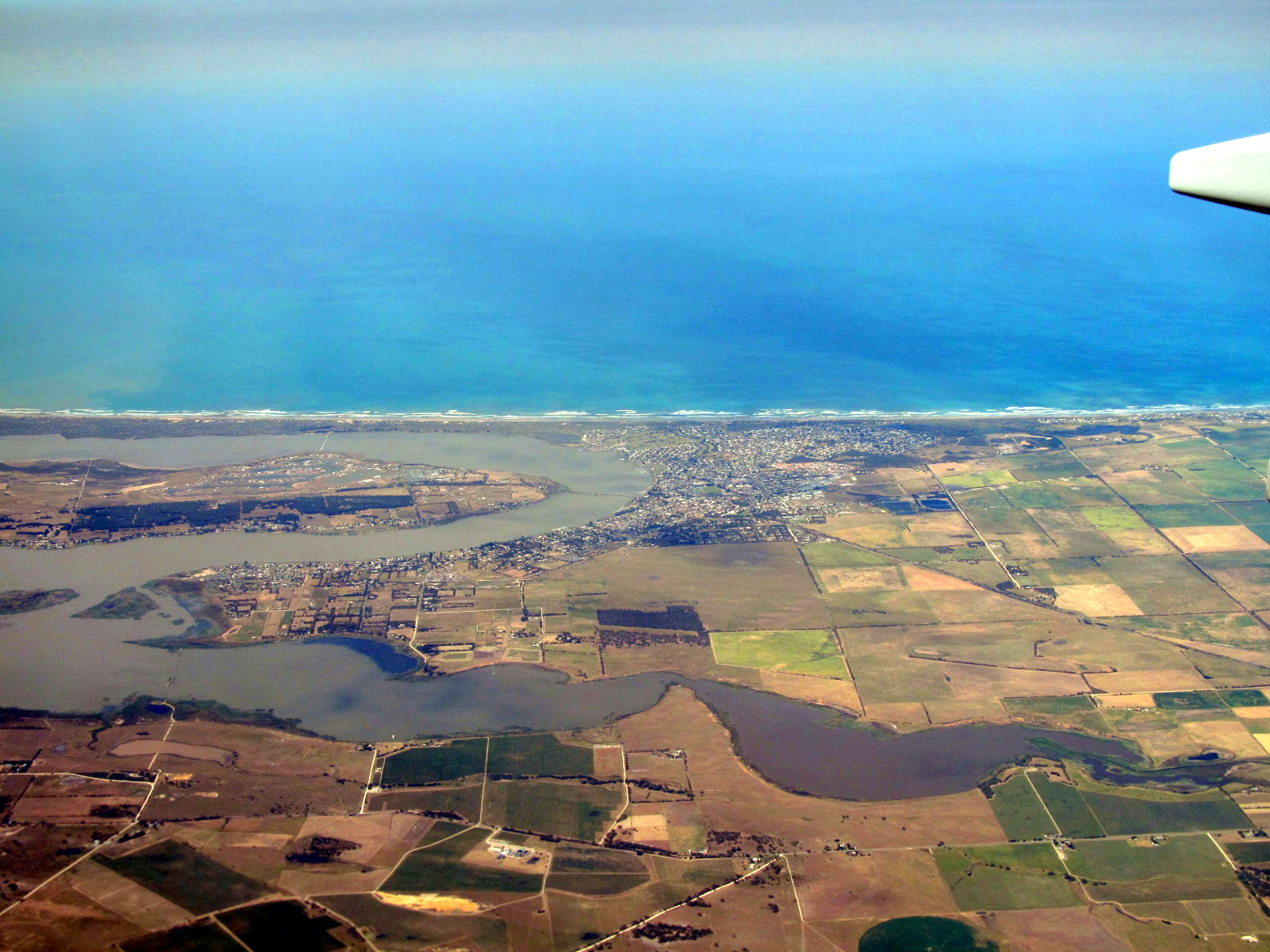
Aerial photo of Goolwa, South Australia with Hindmarsh Island on the left side of image

Pomanda Island (at bottom of image)

== Wellington to Morgan ==
The following is a list of islands (from south to north) within the river’s channel between the town of Wellington and the town of Morgan.

Name	Coordinates	Remarks
Miss Gawler Island	35°08′50″S 139°18′35″E	Island located south east of the city of Murray Bridge and is located beneath the Swanport Bridge.
Long Island	35°07′48″S 139°17′59″E	The island located immediately opposite Murray Bridge and is within the boundaries of the Long Island Recreation Park. The island is considered by the Ngarrindjeri, the Australian Aboriginal people associated with the locality, to be “highly sensitive” (i.e. “high cultural and/or (sic) heritage importance”).
Nott Island	34°22′44″S 139°37′30″E	Island located about 3 kilometres (1.9 miles) south of the town of Blanchetown.
Reedy Island	34°17′43″S 139°38′12″E	Island located about 7 kilometres (4.3 miles) north of Blanchetown, immediately across the river from the Roonka Conservation Park and immediately south of Julia Island.
Julia Island	34°17′30″S 139°38′24″E	Island located immediately adjacent to Reedy Island and across the river from the Roonka Conservation Park.

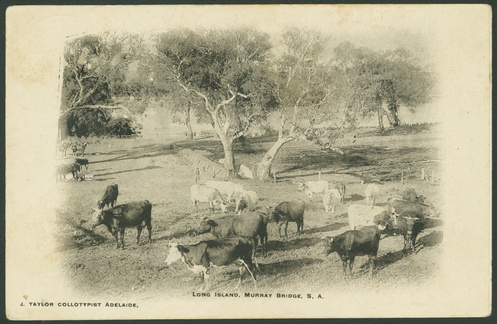
Cattle grazing at Long Island, circa 1900 (State Library of South Australia (B 26826)

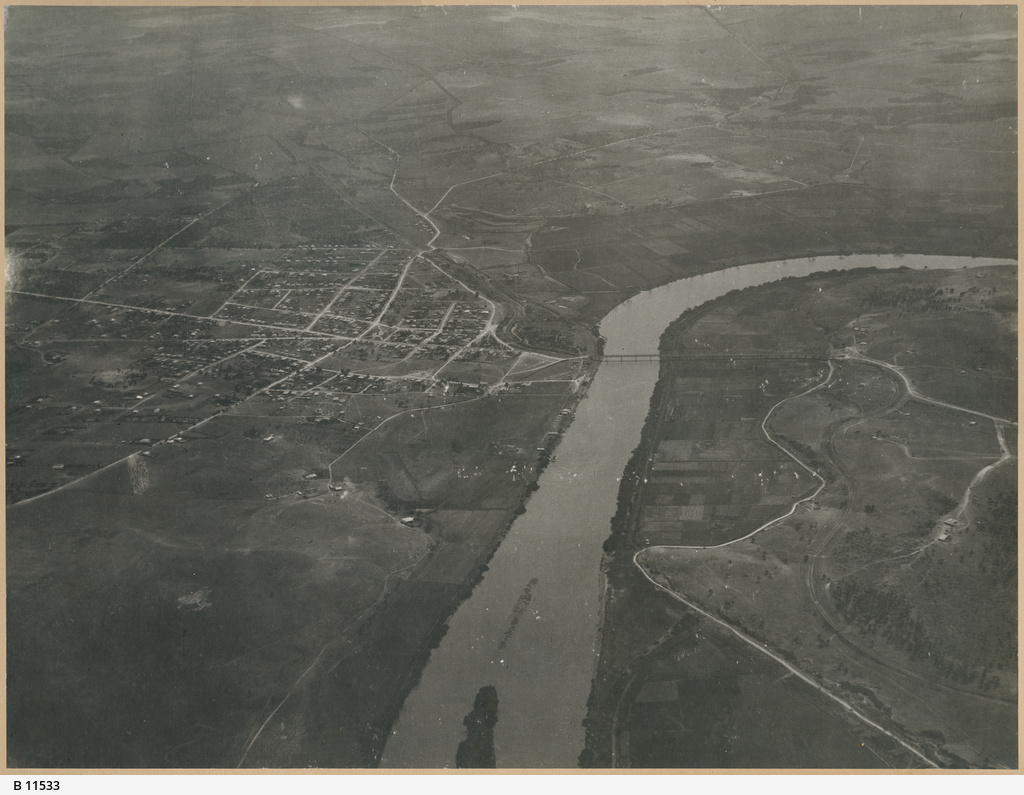
Aerial view of Murray Bridge from the south including the north end of Long Island, circa 1920 (State Library of South Australia B 11533)

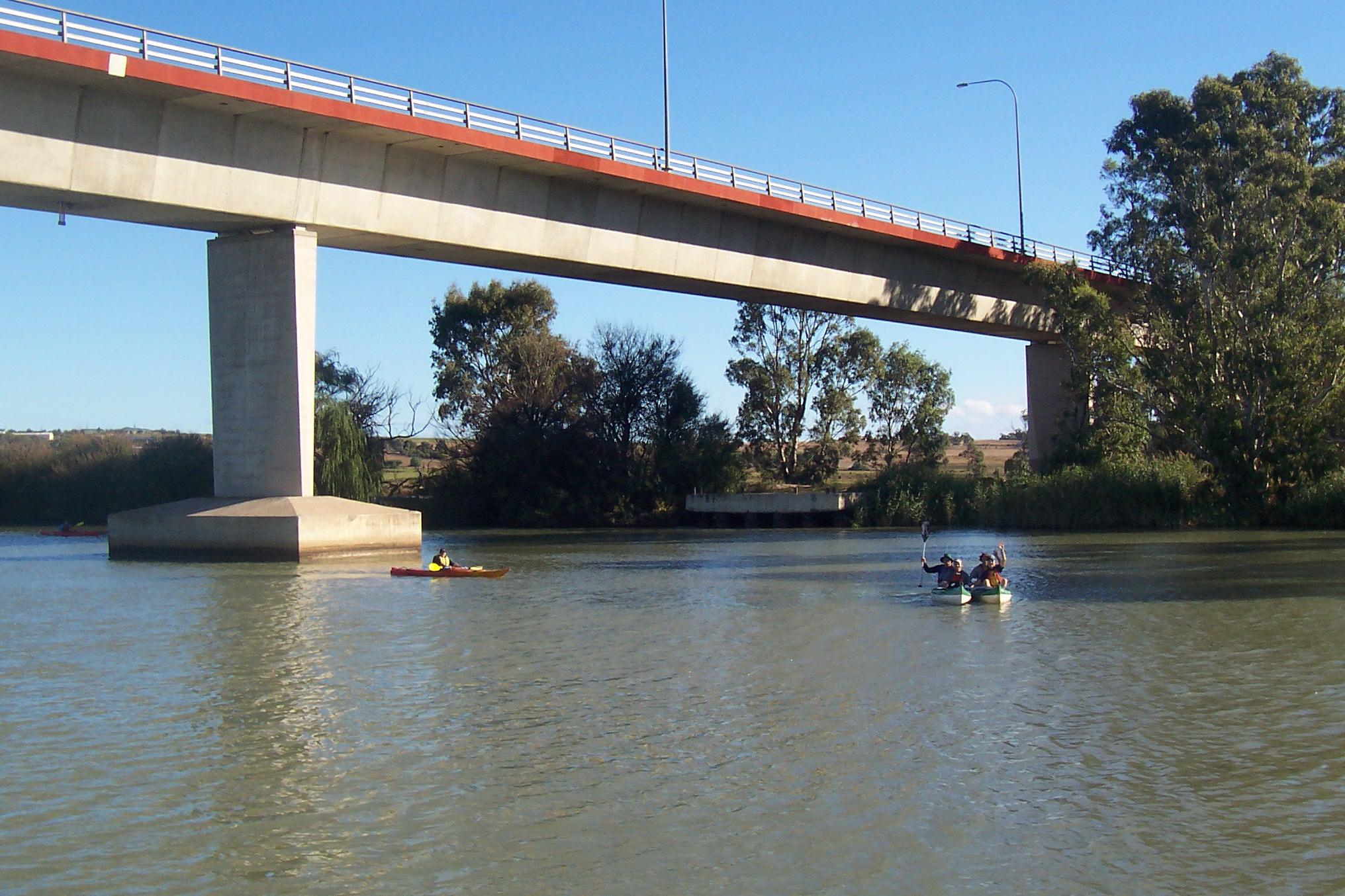
Miss Gawler Island is located below the Swanport Bridge

== Morgan to the border ==
The following is a list of islands (from west to east) within the river’s channel between the town of Morgan and the borders with New South Wales and Victoria.

Name	Coordinates	Remarks
Hart Island	34°10′33″S 140°03′17″E	Island located east of the town of Waikerie. Previously known as Wigleys Island. The current name has been in use since at least 1888, possibly named after J.Hart, a pastoralist.
Sandy Island	34°10′57″S 140°05′04″E	The existence of this island is based on an entry in an atlas dated 1877. As of 2015, the responsible government agency reported that the island is not indicated on "current mapping" within the locality.
Ball Island	34°10′59″S 140°20′27″E	
Thurk Island	34°13′05″S 140°22′02″E	Island located in the channel east of Kingston-on-Murray opposite the Loch Luna Game Reserve. Previously known as Chambers Island or Isle.
Moorook Island	34°17′13″S 140°22′12″E	Island located opposite to the town of Moorook. Also known as Moorook Isle and Moorik Isle.
Nynes Island	34°19′58″S 140°23′11″E	Previously known as Pyap Island.
Forbys Island	34°26′36″S 140°30′00″E	
Katarapko Island	34°24′20″S 140°33′22″E	Island is located within the extent of the Murray River National Park. Previously known as Cragg Island.
Kapunda Island	34°26′54″S 140°33′36″E	Located in the main river channel to the immediate north-west of Loxton and within the Kapunda Island Conservation Park. In 1994, the island was reported as having an area of 1 hectare (2.5 acres) and as being “only accessible by boat.”
Rilli Island	34°23′37″S 140°34′40″E	Located within the extent of the Rilli Island Conservation Park. Previously known as Riley Island and also referred to as Rilli Isle. In 1994, the island was as having an area of 4 hectares (9.9 acres) and as being “only accessible by boat except during low river flows when” it is “accessible by foot, from the south bank of the River…”
Media Island	34°25′46″S 140°35′17″E	Island located to the south east of Loxton and within the extent of Media Island Conservation Park. Previously known as Medea Island and also referred to as Media Isle. In 1994, the island was reported as having an area of 1 hectare (2.5 acres) and as being “only accessible by boat except during low river flows when” it is “accessible by foot, from the south bank of the River…”
Punkey Island	34°15′15″S 140°42′24″E	Also known as Penky Island.
Cemlell Island	34°14′20″S 140°42′27″E	Also known as Gumlell Island.
Muklemuk Island	34°14′11″S 140°43′52″E	Also known as Muckle Muk Island.
Reny Island	34°03′33″S 140°44′09″E	
Nelbuck Island	34°06′05″S 140°44′47″E	Island which adjoins Bulyong Island, was gazetted on 19 September 1996 by the direction of the state's Minister of Environment.
Nelwart Island	34°12′55″S 140°44′56″E	Also called Nelwart Island
Goat Island	34°11′14″S 140°45′08″E	
Bulyong Island	34°07′21″S 140°45′51″E	Island located within the extent of the Murray River National Park.
Kylie Island	34°08′12″S 140°45′51″E	Name derived from the surname of the land owners.
Causeway Island	34°10′08″S 140°45′56″E	
Longwang Island	34°08′53″S 140°46′15″E	
Sandy Island	34°15′20″S 140°47′34″E	Also known as Sandy Ridge.
Hunchee Island	34°03′07″S 140°47′36″E	
Little Hunchee Island	34°01′57″S 140°49′28″E	Island located partly within the Chowilla Game Reserve.
Chowilla Island	33°59′19″S 140°52′44″E	Island located within the Chowilla Game Reserve.
Monoman Island	33°59′19″S 140°52′44″E	Island located within the Chowilla Game Reserve.
Reedy Island	33°57′51″S 140°54′15″E	Island located within the Chowilla Game Reserve.
Boat Creek Island	33°57′09″S 140°54′45″E	Island located within the Chowilla Game Reserve.
Slaney Island	33°57′00″S 140°55′51″E	Island located within the Chowilla Game Reserve. Also known as Stanley Island.
Newena Island	33°57′44″S 140°55′55″E	Island located within the Chowilla Game Reserve; also known as the Isle of Man.
Punkah Island	33°56′45″S 140°58′04″E	Island located within the Chowilla Game Reserve.
Wilpena Island	33°59′50″S 140°59′00″E	Island located within the Chowilla Game Reserve.
Grand Junction Island	33°58′50″S 140°59′22″E	Island located within the Chowilla Game Reserve.
Hypurna Island	34°00′12″S 140°59′57″E	Island which is partly located within the Chowilla Game Reserve, also straddles the border with New South Wales.

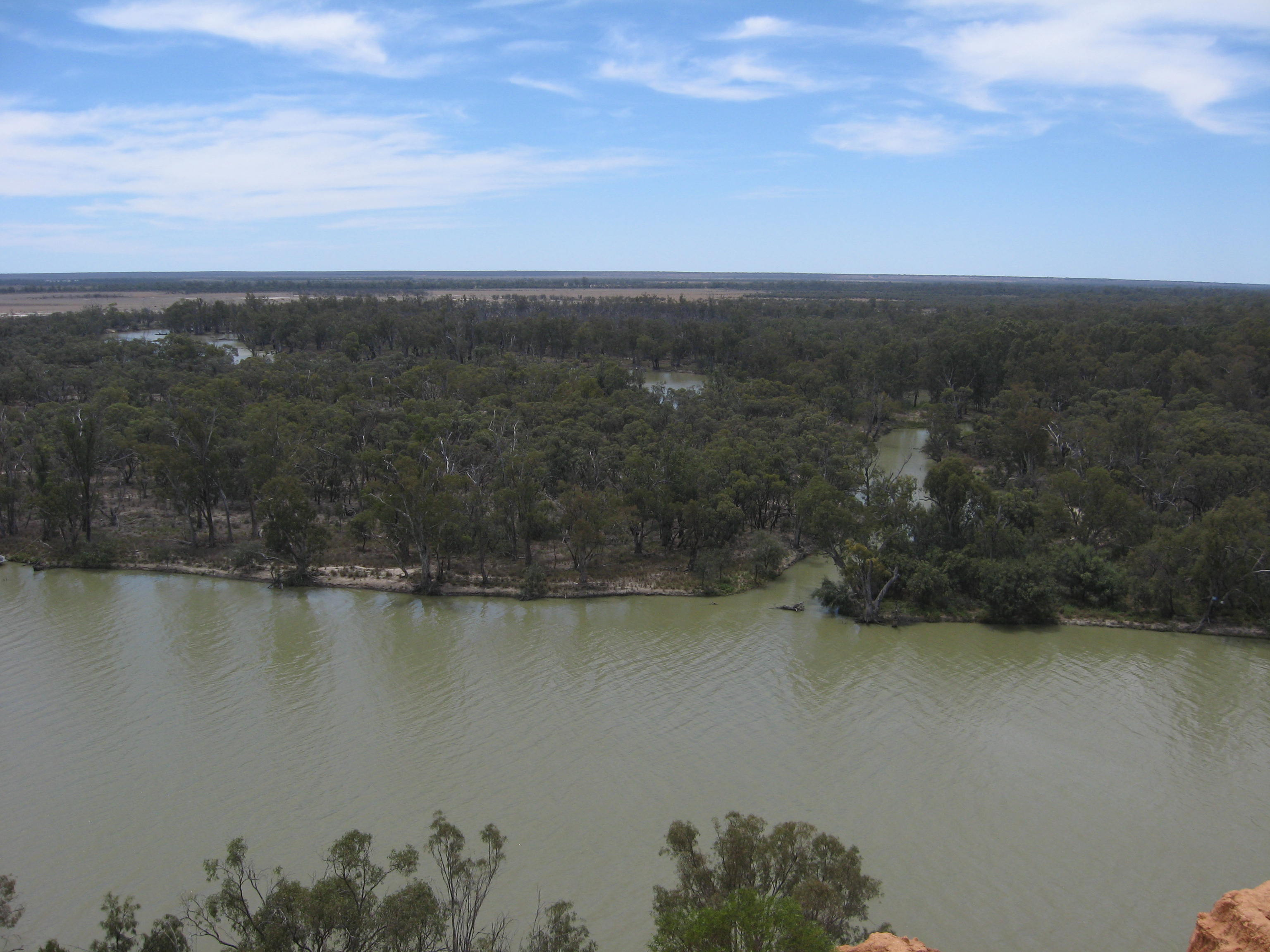
Hunchee Island viewed from Headings Cliff on the opposite of the Murray River.

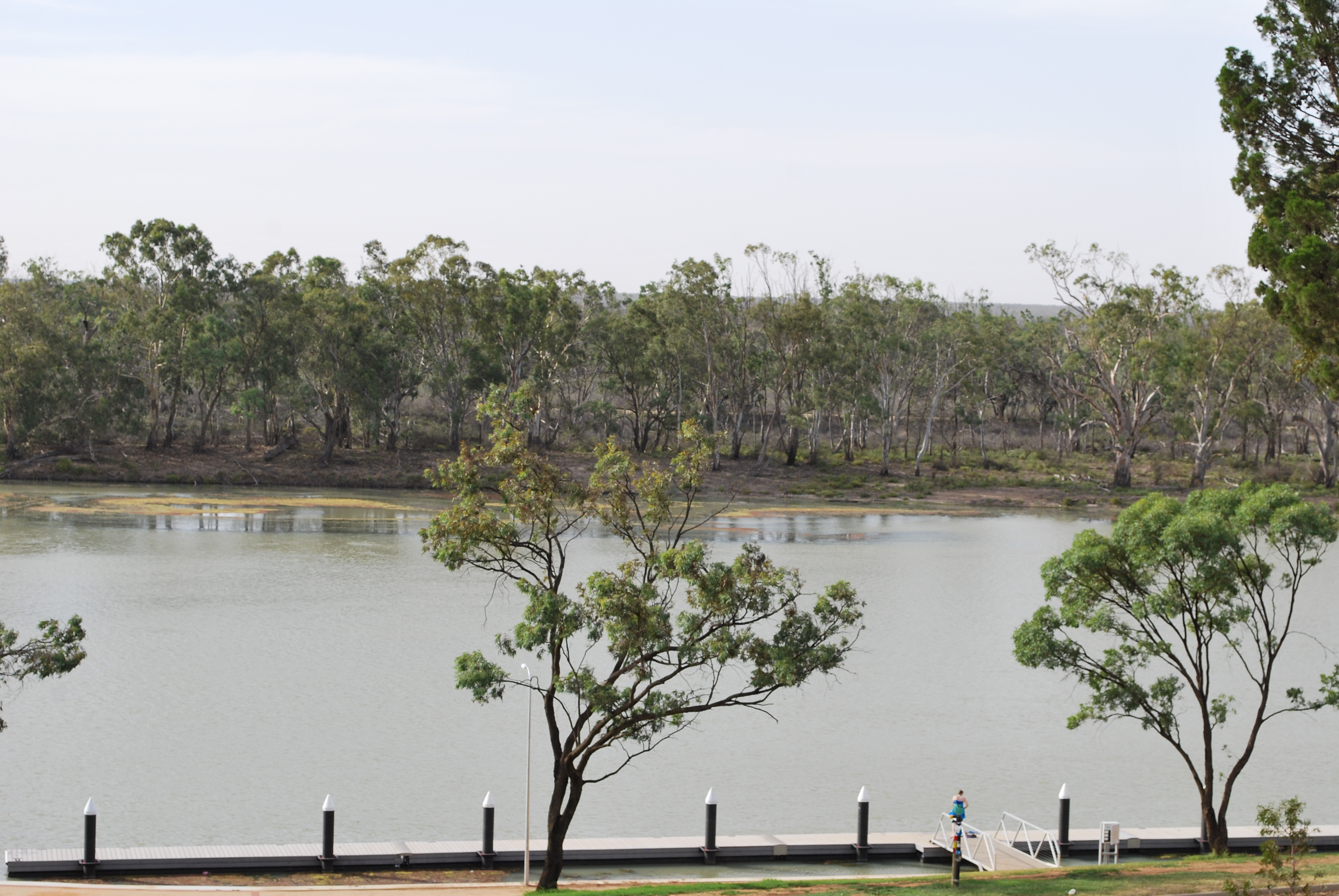
Katarapko Island as viewed from Loxton.

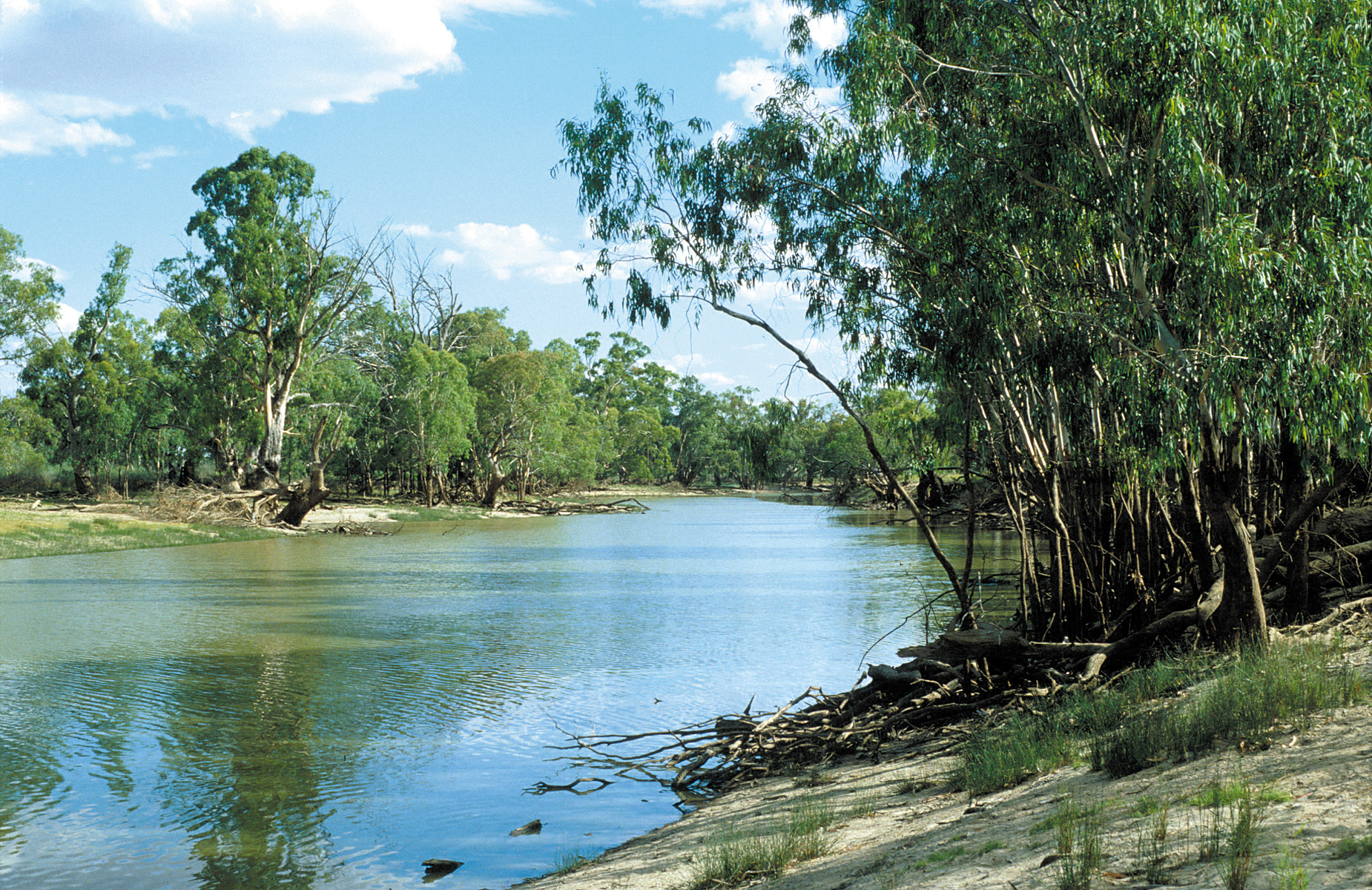
View of Punkah Creek showing both Punkah Island and the mainland.

== See also ==
- List of islands of Australia
- List of islands in lakes

== Citations and references ==
=== References ===
- Boating Industry Association of South Australia (BIA); South Australia. Department for Environment and Heritage (2005), South Australia's waters an atlas & guide, Boating Industry Association of South Australia, ISBN 978-1-86254-680-6
- "Murray River National Park Management Plan (including Rilli Island, Media Island and Kapunda Island Conservation Park)" (PDF). Department for Environment and Natural Resources (DENR). 1994. Archived from the original (PDF) on 24 September 2015.
- "Coorong National Park - Goolwa Barrage to Long Point Map" (PDF). Department of Environment, Water and Natural Resources (DEWNR). 2014a.
- "Coorong National Park - Long Point to Magrath Flat Map" (PDF). Department of Environment, Water and Natural Resources (DEWNR). 2014b.
- "Coorong National Park - Magrath Flat to Policeman Point Map" (PDF). Department of Environment, Water and Natural Resources (DEWNR). 2014c.
- "Coorong National Park - Policeman Point to 42 Mile Crossing Map" (PDF). Department of Environment, Water and Natural Resources (DEWNR). 2014d.
- "Chowilla Game Reserve - temporary closures map" (PDF). Department of Environment, Water and Natural Resources. 2014e.
- South Australia. Department of Marine and Harbors (DMH) (1985), The Waters of South Australia a series of charts, sailing notes and coastal photographs, Dept. of Marine and Harbors, South Australia, ISBN 978-0-7243-7603-2
- "Property Location Browser". Department of Planning Transport and Infrastructure (DPTI). 2015. Archived from the original on 12 October 2016.
