= Carpenter Rocks =

Carpenter Rocks South Australia
- Sunset over 'The Carpenter', from Gerloff Bay

- Coordinates: 37°55′00″S 140°23′58″E
- Population: 87 (SAL 2021)
- Established: 31 October 1996 (locality)
- Postcode(s): 5291
- Time zone: ACST (UTC+9:30)
  - Summer (DST): ACDT (UTC+10:30)
- Location: 452 km (281 mi) SE of Adelaide; 35 km (22 mi) SW of Mount Gambier; 37 km (23 mi) W of Port Macdonnell, South Australia
- LGA(s): District Council of Grant
- Region: Limestone Coast
- County: Grey
- State electorate(s): Mount Gambier
- Federal division(s): Barker
Mean max temp	Mean min temp	Annual rainfall
19.0 °C; 66 °F	8.2 °C; 47 °F	708.4 mm 27.9 in
Localities around Carpenter Rocks:
Canunda	German Flat; German Creek	German Creek
Canunda; Ocean	Carpenter Rocks	Kongorong
Ocean	Ocean; Pelican Point	Pelican Point; Blackfellows Caves
- Footnotes: Adjoining localities

Carpenter Rocks is a town and locality located 35 kilometres (22 mi) south-west of Mount Gambier in the south-east of South Australia. The area faces the Southern Ocean and is renowned for its rugged coastline which provides exceptional fishing and diving locations.

Carpenter Rocks is in the District Council of Grant local government area, the South Australian House of Assembly electoral district of Mount Gambier and the Australian House of Representatives Division of Barker.

== History and settlement ==
The earliest people in the Carpenter Rocks area were the Aboriginal communities from the Booandik tribe. They were scattered in small groups along the coast where they had access to an abundance of food and water. Due to disease and land dispossession the last full-blooded Booandik person died in 1904.

Lieutenant James Grant, when on board HMS Lady Nelson, was the first known British person to view land known today as south-eastern South Australia. On 3 December 1800, he sighted what at first he thought were four unconnected islands, but on a closer look, realised were two mountains and two capes. One of these he named Cape Banks, just west of today's township, after English botanist Joseph Banks. On 4 April 1802, the French explorer Nicholas Baudin aboard the ship Geographe noticed the area and made the observation:

Along the beach we could make out a continuous line of rocks which stretched a little way out to sea and over which the breakers pounded with extraordinary force. This was the cause of the incessant noise which we could hear.

According to Geoffrey Manning and Rodney Cockburn in Place Names of South Australia, "The Rocks" were named "Les Carpentiers" ("The Carpenters") by Nicholas Baudin because their indented and serrated nature reminded him of a carpenter's saw.

The passenger steamer Admella was wrecked on a reef near Cape Banks off the coast of Carpenter Rocks in 1859, on a trip from Port Adelaide to Melbourne, with great loss of life, as rescue boats could not get close enough to rescue survivors.

The Cape Banks Lighthouse has been listed as a state heritage place on the South Australian Heritage Register.

On 31 October 1996, boundaries were created for the locality, which was given the "long established name."

== Areas of interest ==
The town is a gateway to the Canunda National Park and Lake Bonney SE. Carpenter Rocks supports a significant southern rock lobster industry and Bucks Bay provides a safe haven for the many fishing boats moored there. Cape Banks lighthouse is located 4 kilometres (2 mi) from the township and it is near here on 5 August 1859 SS Admella was wrecked on a reef with the loss of 89 lives.

== See also ==
- Bucks Lake Game Reserve
- Carpenter Rocks Conservation Park
- Cape Banks Lighthouse
