= Bucks Lake Game Reserve =

Protected area in South Australia

- IUCN category VI (protected area with sustainable use of natural resources)
- Location within South Australia
- Location: South Australia
- Nearest city: Carpenter Rocks
- Coordinates: 37°54′19″S 140°23′58″E
- Area: 1.38 km^{2} (0.53 sq mi)
- Established: 25 April 1968
- Visitors: ‘less than 10 each year’ (in 2007)
- Governing body: Department for Environment and Water

Bucks Lake Game Reserve, formerly the Bucks Lake National Park, is a protected area located in the Limestone Coast of South Australia about 40 kilometres (25 miles) south-west of Mount Gambier and immediately east of the township of Carpenter Rocks. The game reserve was originally created as the Bucks Lake National Park in 1968 under the National Parks Act 1966 and was re-proclaimed as a game reserve under the National Parks and Wildlife Act 1972 for the purpose of the conservation of wildlife and management of game. The game reserve is used for duck hunting with species being harvested including grey teal, chestnut teal, Pacific black duck, pink-eared duck and Australian shelduck. Hunting is conducted during a proclaimed open season with hunters requiring to have an "endorsed hunting permit" and have a bag limit for specific species.

The game reserve is classified as an IUCN Category VI protected area. In 1980, it was listed on the now-defunct Register of the National Estate.

== See also ==
- Duck hunting in South Australia
