= Carpenter Rocks Conservation Park =

Protected area in South Australia

- IUCN category VI (protected area with sustainable use of natural resources)
- Location within South Australia
- Location: South Australia
- Nearest city: Carpenter Rocks
- Coordinates: 37°55′07″S 140°24′56″E
- Area: 33 ha (82 acres)
- Established: 6 September 2001
- Visitors: ‘less than 100 people per year’ (in 2007)
- Governing body: Department for Environment and Water

Carpenter Rocks Conservation Park is a protected area located in the Australian state of South Australia in the locality of Carpenter Rocks about 370 kilometres (230 mi) south-east of the state capital of Adelaide and about 1.5 kilometres (0.93 mi) south east of the town centre in Carpenter Rocks.

The conservation park was proclaimed on 6 September 2001 under the National Parks and Wildlife Act 1972 to protect threatened species and vegetation communities in particular:

A number of threatened species and plant communities are conserved within the park. It protects part of the only known population of Carpenter Rocks Manna Gum (Eucalyptus splendens ssp. arcana), which is a newly-described species, along with several other plants of national, state or regional significance. The park protects significant habitat for the Orange-bellied Parrot (Neophema chrysogaster), which is critically endangered at a national level. This important threatened species was recorded more regularly at the Carpenter Rocks site than at any other site in South Australia during the 1980s and early 1990s.

The conservation park is classified as an IUCN Category VI protected area.
