= Canunda National Park =

National park in Australia

- IUCN category VI (protected area with sustainable use of natural resources)
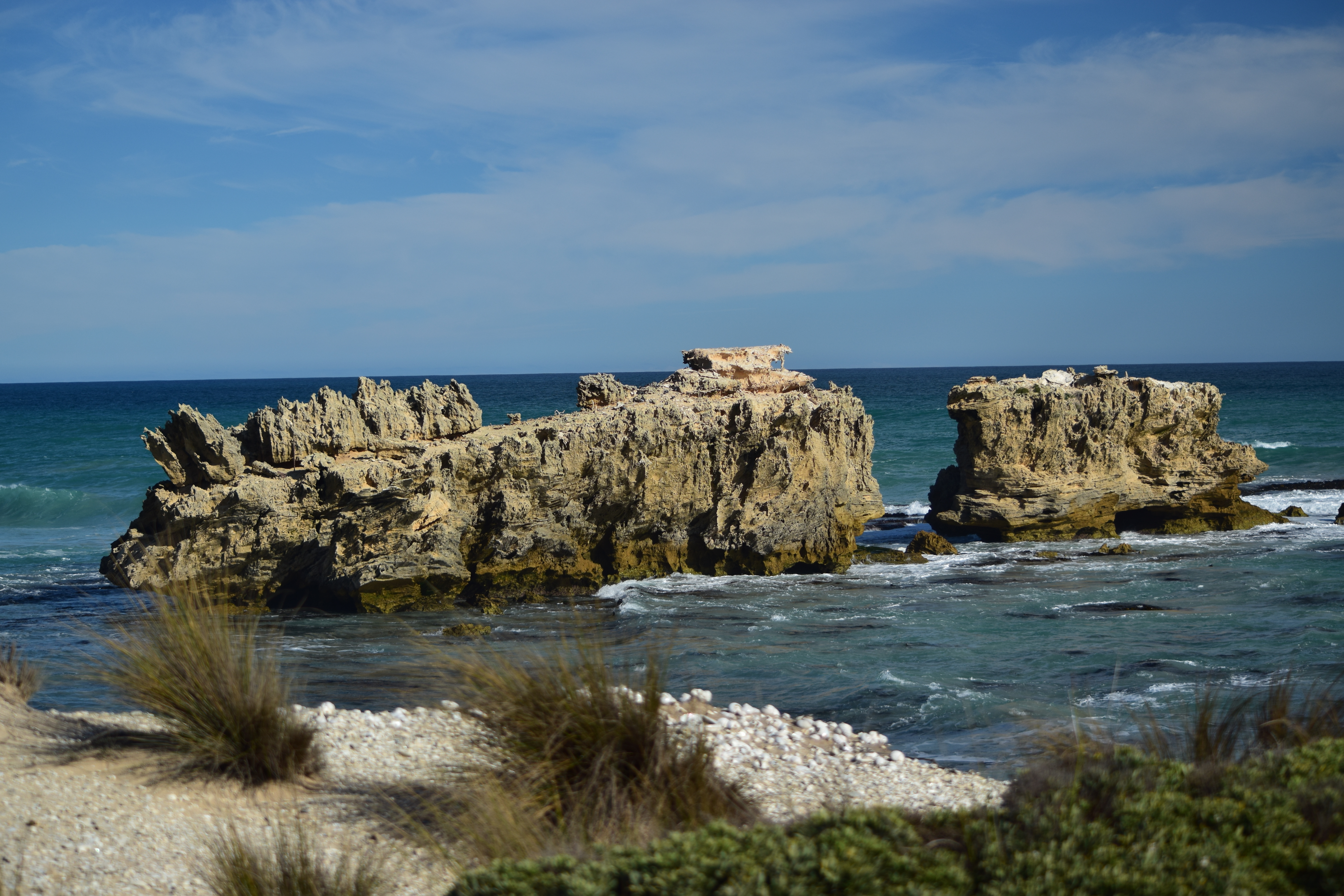
- Mounce and Battye Rocks. Canunda National Park

- Location within South Australia
- Location: South Australia
- Nearest city: Millicent
- Coordinates: 37°35′52″S 140°10′31″E
- Area: 96.24 km^{2} (37.16 sq mi)
- Established: 20 August 1959
- Governing body: Department of Environment and Water
- Website: http://www.environment.sa.gov.au/parks/Find_a_Park/Browse_by_region/Limestone_Coast/Canunda_National_Park

Canunda National Park is a protected area in the Australian state of South Australia located about 350 km (220 mi) southeast of Adelaide, on the coast about 13 km (8.1 mi) southwest of Millicent. It consists of coastal dunes, limestone cliffs, and natural bushland. The beaches can be dangerous, but are popular for beach fishing and 4WD's.

The national park consists of two parts - the first part being land in the gazetted localities of Southend and Canunda while the second part is located to the south in the gazetted locality of Carpenter Rocks at the headland of Cape Banks.

From as far back as 10,000 years ago, members of the Boandik group of Indigenous Australians lived in temporary camps along the coast during summer, and for the rest of the year they lived near inland swamps in relatively permanent huts (wurlies).

Much of the national park is accessible only to four wheel drive vehicles and walkers. The national park's office is located in the town of Southend at the northernmost end of the park. The northern end of the national park was once part of Mayurra Station. The remnants of Canunda's pastoral history can be seen at Coola Outstation.

== See also ==
- Protected areas of South Australia
- Cape Banks Lighthouse
- Lower South East Marine Park
