= Mud Islands Game Reserve =

Protected area in South Australia

- IUCN category VI (protected area with sustainable use of natural resources)
- Location within South Australia
- Location: South Australia
- Nearest city: Goolwa
- Coordinates: 35°33′52″S 139°0′4″E
- Area: 1.25 km^{2} (0.48 sq mi)
- Established: 21 November 1968
- Governing body: Department for Environment and Water

Mud Islands Game Reserve is a protected area in South Australia covering ten islands at the southern side of Lake Alexandrina about 19 kilometres (12 miles) south-east of Goolwa. The game reserve is described as providing "an ideal habitat for water birds, particularly waterfowl" and that "duck shooting is permitted during open season". Since 2000, the game reserve has been located within the boundaries of the gazetted locality, Coorong.

The game reserve is classified as an IUCN Category VI protected area. In 1980, it was listed on the now-defunct Register of the National Estate.

== See also ==
- Duck hunting in South Australia
- List of islands within the Murray River in South Australia
