= Chowilla, South Australia =

Chowilla
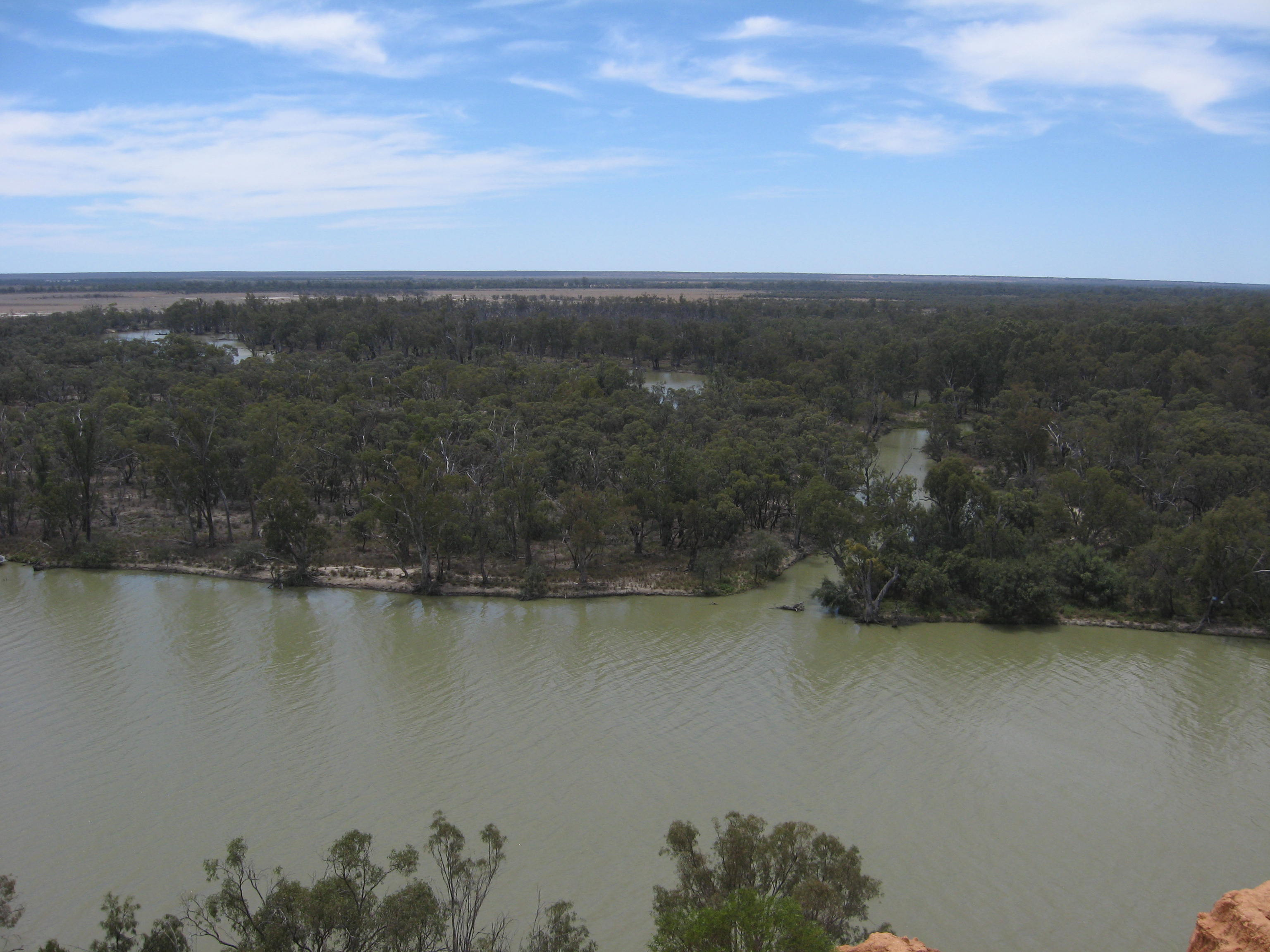
- Chowilla as viewed from Headings Cliff on the opposite side of the Murray River.

- Coordinates: 33°44′49″S 140°52′22″E
- Country: Australia
- State: South Australia
- Region: Murray and Mallee
- LGA: Pastoral Unincorporated Area
- Location: 250 km (160 mi) NE of Adelaide; 40 km (25 mi) NE of Renmark
- Established: 26 April 2013

Government
  - State electorate: Chaffey
  - Federal division: Barker

Population
  - Total: 0 (2016 census)
- Time zone: UTC+9:30 (ACST)
  - Summer (DST): UTC+10:30 (ACST)
- Postcode: 5341
- County: Hamley
- Mean max temp: 25.0 °C (77.0 °F)
- Mean min temp: 9.7 °C (49.5 °F)
- Annual rainfall: 242.5 mm (9.55 in)
Localities around Chowilla
Danggali	Danggali	New South Wales
Calperum Station	Chowilla	New South Wales
Murtho	Murtho; Victoria	Victoria

Chowilla is a locality in the Australian state of South Australia, located on the northern side of the Murray River about 250 kilometres (160 miles) to the north-east of the capital city of Adelaide and about 40 kilometres (25 miles) to the north-east of the town of Renmark, and which is bounded by the border with New South Wales in the east.

The property was settled in 1864 by Richard Holland on behalf of his three step-sons and was originally part of the larger property, Bookmark. More information is available at www.chowilla.com.au

The land use within Chowilla is concerned with the following protected areas, the Chowilla Game Reserve and the Chowilla Regional Reserve which have fully occupied its extent since its establishment in 2013.

There are three historic sites within Chowilla which have been listed on the South Australian Heritage Register: the Suicide Bridge (or Lunatic Bridge), including nearby remnant posts from the New South Wales-South Australia telegraph line and Littra House, both near Lake Littra, and Todd's Obelisk, near the New South Wales border.

The 2016 Australian census which was conducted in August 2016 reports that Chowilla had a population of zero. This was because the residents of Chowilla, James, Kerrie, Emily and Sophie Robertson were not provided with census documents. The Robertson family have lived on Chowilla since 1864.

Chowilla is located within the federal Division of Barker, the state electoral district of Chaffey, the Pastoral Unincorporated Area of South Australia and the state's Murray and Mallee region.

== See also ==
- Riverland Biosphere Reserve
