= Danggali, South Australia =

Danggali
- Suburb
- Coordinates: 33°19′26″S 140°45′16″E
- Country: Australia
- State: South Australia
- LGA: Pastoral Unincorporated Area
- Location: 230 km (140 mi) north east of Adelaide; 70 km (43 mi) north of Renmark
- Established: 26 April 2013

Government
  - State electorate: Chaffey Stuart
  - Federal division: Barker Grey

Population
  - Total: 0 (2016 census)
- Time zone: UTC+9:30 (ACST)
  - Summer (DST): UTC+10:30 (ACST)
- Postcode: 5417
- County: Hamley "Out of counties"
- Mean max temp: 25.3 °C (77.5 °F)
- Mean min temp: 9.3 °C (48.7 °F)
- Annual rainfall: 281.5 mm (11.08 in)
Suburbs around Danggali
Quandong	Oakvale Station	New South Wales
Pine Valley Station	Danggali	New South Wales
Calperum Station	Chowilla	New South Wales

Danggali is a locality in the Australian state of South Australia located about 70 kilometres (43 miles) north of the town of Renmark and about 230 kilometres (140 miles) north-east of the state capital of Adelaide.

The locality was established on 26 April 2013 in respect to “the long established local name.”

The land use within Danggali is concerned with the following protected areas, the Danggali Conservation Park and the Danggali Wilderness Protection Area which have fully occupied its extent since its establishment in 2013.

The 2021 Australian census which was conducted in August 2021 reports that Danggali had a population of zero, consistent with what the 2016 census found.

Danggali is located within the federal divisions of Barker and Grey, the state electoral districts of Chaffey and Stuart, the Pastoral Unincorporated Area of South Australia and the state’s Murray and Mallee region.

== See also ==
- List of cities and towns in South Australia
- Riverland Biosphere Reserve
