= Cape Banks Lighthouse =

Lighthouse in South Australia

Cape Banks lighthouse
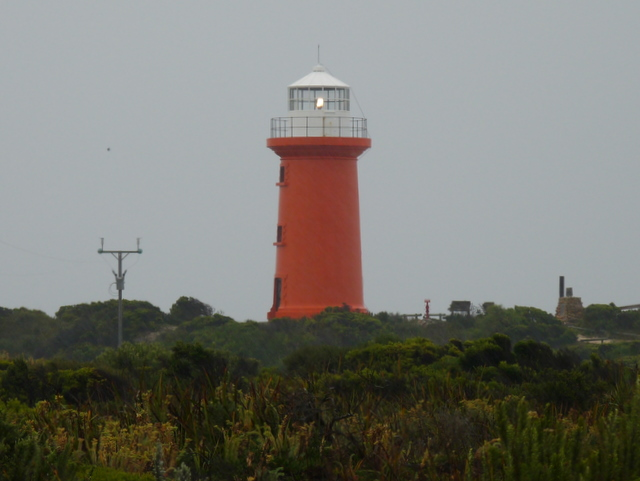
- The Cape Banks Lighthouse in 2010
- Location: Carpenter Rocks, South Australia, (Note: Sources such as Australian Government and the United States National Geospatial-Intelligence Agency state that the lighthouse is located on Cape Banks while other sources as the Government of South Australia (i.e. the authority for placenames in its jurisdiction) and the Boating Industry Association of South Australia show the lighthouse to be located on an unnamed headland at the northern end of the next bay to the west of the bay where Cape Banks is located.) Australia
- Coordinates: 37°53′57″S 140°22′30″E

Tower
- Constructed: 1882-83
- Construction: limestone masonry
- Automated: 1928
- Height: 15 metres (49 ft) (Note: Sources such as Rowlett and the State Library of South Australia state that the lighthouse’s height was increased to 15 metres in 1928, however photographs taken in both 1910 and 2010 show a building with no change in height.)
- Shape: “round limestone tower with lantern and gallery”
- Markings: tower painted bright orange-red, lantern white
- Power source: mains electricity
- Operator: Australian Maritime Safety Authority
- Heritage: State heritage place

Light
- First lit: 1883
- Focal height: 25 metres (82 ft)
- Lens: “3rd order Fresnel lens”
- Intensity: 20,000 candela
- Range: 18 nautical miles (33 km; 21 mi)
- Characteristic: two white flashes every 10 s

Cape Banks Lighthouse is a lighthouse in the Australian state of South Australia located in the state's south-east on an unnamed headland in the gazetted locality of Carpenter Rocks about 2.5 kilometres (1.6 mi) north-west of the locality's town centre.

The siting of a lighthouse near Cape Banks was discussed as early as 1880, in conjunction with the rebuilding of the Cape Northumberland Lighthouse because it was suggested as a suitable site for the “optical apparatus” from the above-mentioned lighthouse to be reused and because it was a location “where so many shipping casualties have occurred.”

In March 1882, construction of the new lighthouse at “the Carpenter Rocks, adjacent to Cape Banks” was announced. The proposal with a budget of £3,770 involved the reuse of the “catoptric apparatus now at Cape Northumberland lighthouse.“ The lighthouse was described as being about 9.1 metres (30 ft) high with the light's focal plane being about 18 metres (60 ft) about the high water mark and that it would be visible as far away as 16–19 kilometres (10–12 mi).

On 27 July 1882, Goss & Lambert of Mount Gambier was contracted for an amount of “about £3,000“ to build the “lighthouse, a store, and two lightkeepers' cottages.”

The light was first used on 1 January 1883. In May 1928, an automated light was commissioned resulting in the departure of the keeper and their family. Offers for either the removal of the keepers’ cottages or for the lease of the cottages and associated land for periods of five or ten years were advertised in the press by the Commonwealth Department of Works and Railways in August 1928. The cottages and the store were subsequently demolished.

The lighthouse has been listed as a state heritage place on the South Australian Heritage Register since 11 November 1999. Its significance is reported as follows:

The Cape Banks Lighthouse is important in the maritime history of South Australia and the establishment of navigation aids during the late 19th century. It represents developments in lighthouse technology and design of the time. The lantern house, re-used from the original Cape Northumberland Lighthouse, is of particular significance as one of only three Deville and Company lanterns remaining in Australia. Like one of the other lanterns (at Cape Borda) the lantern house at Cape Banks is of a distinctive fourteen-sided design.(HSA Assessment Report 1999)

The lighthouse also appeared on the now-defunct Register of the National Estate.

The cadastral unit of land which includes the lighthouse was added to the Canunda National Park on 14 August 1997.

== See also ==
- List of lighthouses in Australia
- List of state heritage places in the District Council of Grant

== Notes and references ==
=== Attribution ===
- This article incorporates text by Government of South Australia available under the CC BY 3.0 AU licence.
