= Lake Robe Game Reserve =

Protected area in South Australia

- IUCN category VI (protected area with sustainable use of natural resources)
- Location within South Australia
- Location: South Australia
- Nearest city: Robe
- Coordinates: 37°12′47″S 139°47′59″E
- Area: 4.06 km^{2} (1.57 sq mi)
- Established: 4 November 1993
- Governing body: Department for Environment and Water

Lake Robe Game Reserve is a protected area located about 6 kilometres (3.7 miles) south of the town of Robe in South Australia. It covers the saline lake, Lake Robe, and some surrounding land and also immediately adjoins the northern boundary of the Little Dip Conservation Park. It was proclaimed on 4 November 1993 to protect "valuable habitats for a variety of waterbirds, and terrestrial mammals notably the hooded plover (Thinomis rubricollis), sharp-tailed sandpiper (Calidris acuminata), and the swamp rat (Rattus lutreolus)" and to manage recreational duck hunting activity. The area is classified as an IUCN Category VI protected area.

== See also ==
- Duck hunting in South Australia
- Lake Hawdon System Important Bird Area
