= Kapunda Island Conservation Park =

Protected area in South Australia

- IUCN category III (natural monument or feature)
- Location within South Australia
- Location: South Australia, Loxton
- Nearest city: Loxton
- Coordinates: 34°26′54″S 140°33′36″E
- Area: 1 ha (2.5 acres)
- Established: 4 July 1968
- Governing body: Department for Environment and Water

Kapunda Island Conservation Park is a protected area in the Australian state of South Australia located in the Riverland, confined to a small island in the Murray River. It is adjacent to the Murray River National Park.

== History ==
The area was constituted under the Crown Lands Act 1929 on 4 July 1968 as a fauna conservation reserve.

It was constituted as a conservation park upon the proclamation of the National Parks and Wildlife Act 1972 on 27 April 1972. As of July 2016, the conservation park covered an area of 1 hectare (2.5 acres).

In 1980, it was described as follows:

A small attractive island in the Murray River adjacent to Katarapko Game Reserve. As such may provide a safe refuge for waterbirds during open season. One of only a few island reserves on the South Australian section of the Murray River. Small sand bar island in the Murray River. Vegetation consists of Eucalyptus camaldulensis open forest over Phragmites australis reed beds and Muehlenbeckia cunninghamii.

== Description ==
Kapunda Island Conservation Park is located on Kapunda Island in the Murray River, adjacent to "the town of Loxton" in the cadastral unit of the Hundred of Bookpurnong. It lies in the gazetted locality of Loxton about 1 kilometre (0.62 mi) north-west of the Loxton town centre.

The island is small, covering around 1 ha (2.5 acres), and is located in the main channel of the Murray. It was proclaimed as a conservation park to conserve the natural features of small island environments within the Murray River main channel which are not represented widely in other reserve systems. Vegetation comprises river red gum woodland with a lignum understorey.

The conservation park is classified as an IUCN Category III protected area. In 1980, it was listed on the now-defunct Register of the National Estate.

== Management ==
As of 2023, Kapunda Island, along with the Media Island and Rilli Island conservation parks, is managed in conjunction with the Murray River National Park.

== See also ==
- Protected areas of South Australia
- List of islands within the Murray River in South Australia
