= Rilli Island Conservation Park =

Protected area in South Australia

- IUCN category III (natural monument or feature)
- Location within South Australia
- Location: South Australia, Loxton North
- Nearest city: Loxton
- Coordinates: 34°23′37″S 140°34′39″E
- Area: 6 ha (15 acres)
- Established: 4 July 1968
- Governing body: Department of Environment and Water

Rilli Island Conservation Park is a protected area in the Australian state of South Australia located on the Riverland in the gazetted locality of Loxton North about 6.5 kilometres (4.0 mi) north-east of the Loxton town centre.

The conservation park is located on Rilli Island in the Murray River adjacent to sections 63 and 64 in the cadastral unit of the Hundred of Gordon. It was constituted under the Crown Lands Act 1929 on 4 July 1968 as a fauna conservation reserve. In 1972, it was constituted as a conservation park upon the proclamation of the National Parks and Wildlife Act 1972 on 27 April 1972. As of July 2016, the conservation park covered an area of 6 hectares (15 acres).

In 1980, it was described as follows:

A small, attractive island in the Murray River adjacent to Katarapko Game Reserve. As such may provide a safe refuge for waterbirds during open season. One of only a few island reserves on the South Australian section of the Murray River. Small sand bar island in the Murray River. Vegetation consists of Eucalyptus camaldulensis open forest over Phragmites australis reed beds and Muehlenbeckia cunninghamii.

As of 1994, it and the Kapunda Island and Media Island conservation parks have been managed in conjunction with the Murray River National Park.

The conservation park is classified as an IUCN Category III protected area. In 1980, it was listed on the now-defunct Register of the National Estate.

== See also ==
- Protected areas of South Australia
- List of islands within the Murray River in South Australia
