= Cape Banks =

Cape Banks South Australia
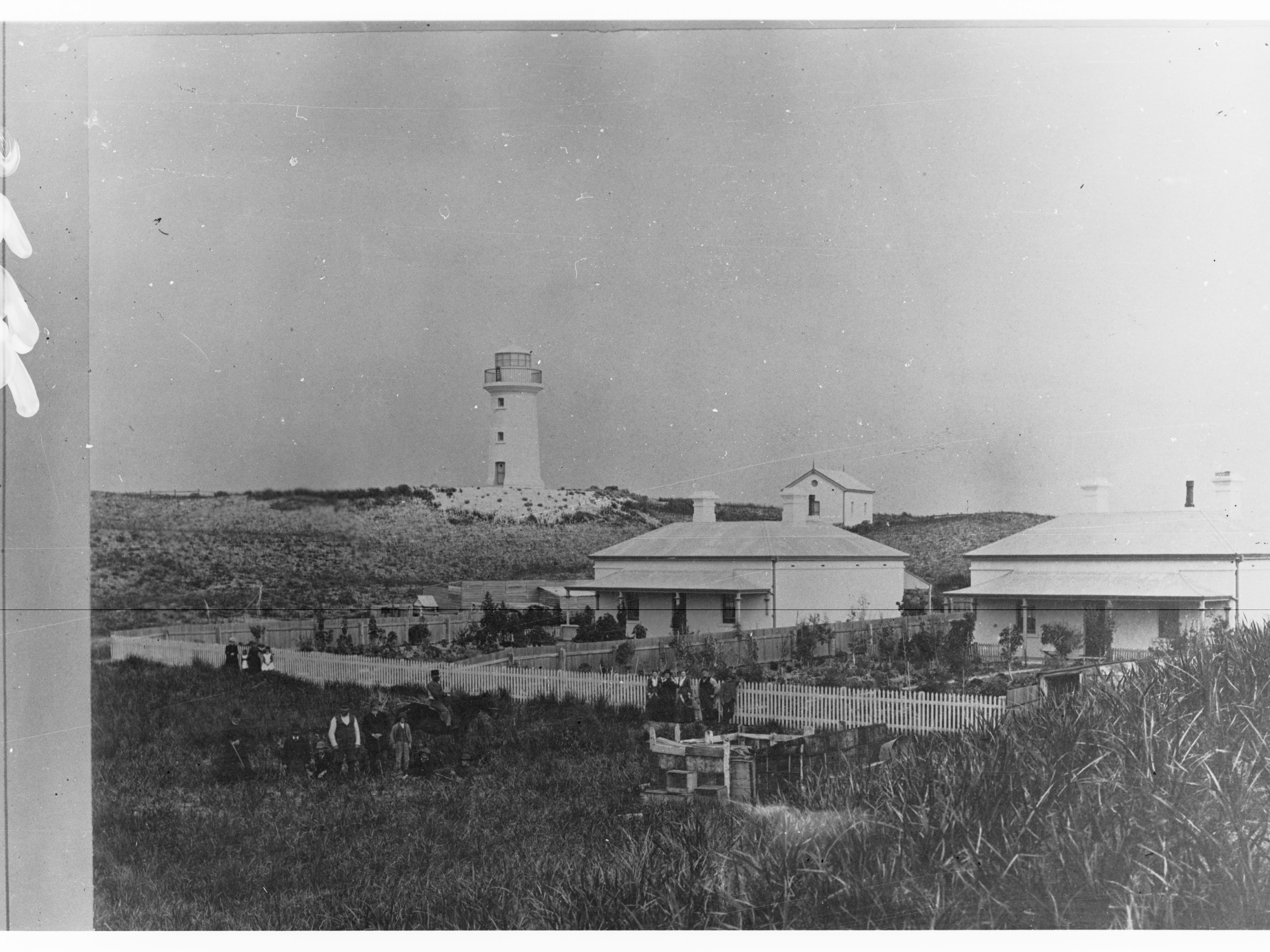
- Cape Banks Lighthouse

- Coordinates: 37°55′14″S 140°23′44″E
- Elevation: 15 m (49 ft)
- Location: 36 km (22 mi) west south-west of Mount Gambier

Cape Banks is a headland in the Australian state of South Australia located in the gazetted locality of Carpenter Rocks at the south end of Bucks Bay and the north end of Bungaloo Bay on the state's south east coast about 36 kilometres (22 miles) west south west of the city of Mount Gambier.

The cape is described by one source as being "a rocky point, 15 metres (49 feet) high, 24 nautical miles (44 kilometres; 28 miles) SSE of Cape Buffon" while another source describes it as ‘a cuspate foreland protruding 500 metres (1,600 feet) seaward in lee of calcarenite rocks and reefs’.

It was named by the Royal Navy officer, James Grant, on 3 December 1800.

The passenger steamer Admella was wrecked on a reef near Cape Banks in 1859, on a trip from Port Adelaide to Melbourne, with great loss of life, as rescue boats could not get close enough to rescue survivors.

The navigation aid known as the Cape Banks Lighthouse is not located on the cape, but on an unnamed headland located at the northern end of Lighthouse Bay which is the next bay to the north-west of Bucks Bay.
