= Murray River National Park =

National park in Australia

- IUCN category VI (protected area with sustainable use of natural resources)
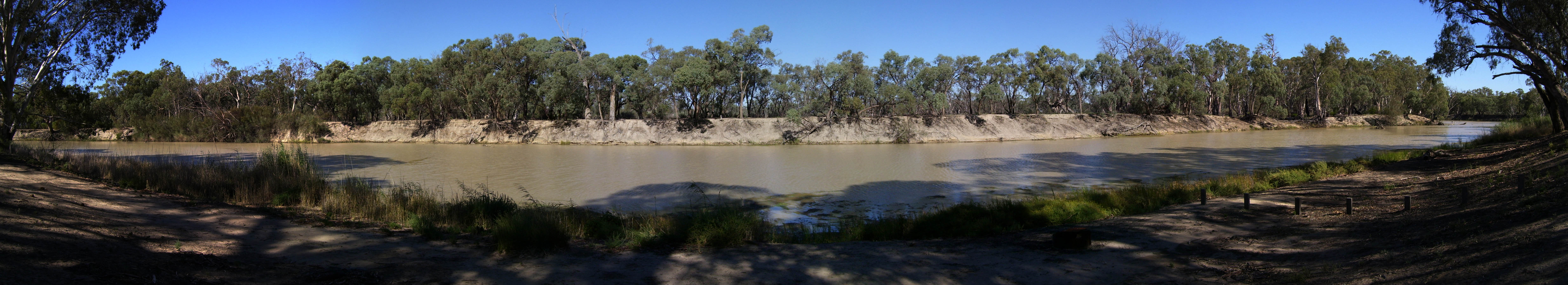
- Murray River, Murray River National Park, March 2010

- Location within South Australia
- Location: South Australia
- Nearest city: Berri
- Coordinates: 34°23′13″S 140°32′23″E
- Area: 148.79 km^{2} (57.45 sq mi)
- Established: 20 June 1991
- Governing body: Department for Environment and Water
- Website: Official website

Murray River National Park is a protected area in South Australia located around 239.81 km (149.01 mi) north east of the Adelaide city centre, lying along the Murray River. The national park is classified as an IUCN Category VI protected area. The national park comprises more than 14,879 ha (36,770 acres), and includes a vast network of Murray River wetlands and floodplains.

== History ==
The Murray River National Park was proclaimed as a national park on 20 June 1991 under the National Parks and Wildlife Act 1972, "to conserve a significant proportion of South Australia’s floodplain environments which are not represented widely in other reserve systems".

The national park originally consisted of three sections: Katarapko, Lyrup Flats, and Bulyong. Three more were added later.

== Description ==
Murray River National Park is located around 239.81 km (149.01 mi) north east of the Adelaide city centre, along the Murray River. As of 2026 the national park comprises more than 14,879 ha (36,770 acres), and includes a vast network of Murray River wetlands and floodplains. The park is classified as an IUCN Category VI protected area.

The park consists of six sections, all of which adjoin the Murray River, extending from near Loxton in the south west to near Renmark in the north-east:

- Katarapko (9,500 ha (23,000 acres)), on the north side of the river between Loxton in the south and Berri in the north
- Lyrup Flats (2,000 ha (4,900 acres)), on the north side of the river midway between Berri and Loxton
- Bulyong, or Bulyong Island, on the west side of the river upstream from Renmark, accessible only by boat
- Paringa Paddock (1,161 ha (2,870 acres)), including Goat Island, between Renmark and Paringa
- Gurra Gurra (520.8 ha (1,287 acres)), just across the river south of Berri, directly opposite Katarapko
- Kingston-on-Murray (931 ha (2,300 acres)), next to the township of Kingston-on-Murray

Katarapko derives its name from Katarapko Creek, which is one of two significant streams flowing through the park; the other is Eckerts Creek. Both are very important habitats for native fish, and good for canoeing The Ngak Indau Wetland trail has a bird hide. Katfish Reach is a community environmental rehabilitation project that encompasses the Katarapko and Eckert Creek area.

Paringa Paddock, located between Renmark and Paringa, includes Goat Island, and contains areas of riverine woodlands, wetlands, and river flats.

The protected areas provide for a number recreational activities such as walking, bike riding, canoeing, bird-watching and bush camping. There are parking facilities, designated camping areas with some toilets, walking trails, and a self-guided drive trail.

The 2023 management plan for the national park includes plans for the management of Rilli Island, Media Island, and Kapunda Island Conservation Parks, which are adjacent to Katarapko.

== Goat Island ==
In 2021, a group of people in the Riverland region started a campaign to rename Goat Island to Ruby Hunter Island, to honour the legacy of singer-songwriter Ruby Hunter, who was born on the island in 1955, as Aboriginal people were not allowed to give birth in the local hospital at that time. As Goat Island is part of the Murray River National Park, the Department for Environment and Water has the final say. In February 2025 a consultation process was undertaken by the Department for Housing and Urban Development, but no decision had been made by March 2026. Ruby Hunter Foundation chair Cheryl Norris, diagnosed with a terminal illness in early 2026, expressed a wish to get it done while Ruby's brothers Wally (Eric Richards) and Jeff Hunter were still alive.

== See also ==
- Katarapko Game Reserve, historical game reserve on Katarapko Island
- List of islands within the Murray River in South Australia
- Protected areas of South Australia
- Riverland Biosphere Reserve
- Riverland Mallee Important Bird Area
