= Chowilla floodplain =

Floodplain mostly in South Australia, extending into New South Wales

Coordinates: 34°S 140°E

The Chowilla floodplain is a floodplain adjacent to the Murray River, upstream of Renmark, South Australia. The floodplain includes the Chowilla Game Reserve and Chowilla Regional Reserve, and also extends across the state border into New South Wales.

== History ==
Aboriginal Australians occupied the area before British colonisation of South Australia. European pastoralists first occupied the region in the 1840s. Among the first pioneers was Fred Handcock, who overlanded livestock from New South Wales, and lost his life there in 1847.

The Chowilla Dam was proposed to be built across the floodplain in the 1960s, and if it had been built, much of the floodplain that is now protected would have been permanently flooded.

After significant drought and low water flows in the Murray River around 2009-2010, the flood plains were under significant stress due to lack of water. As a response to this, additional regulators were installed to enable artificial floods across parts of the wetland to ensure the health of the trees by simulating the natural floods that would have occurred before the river was regulated by the locks and weirs and upstream dams.

== Ramsar wetland ==
The Chowilla floodplain is protected as part of the Riverland Ramsar site, designated by the Ramsar Convention as a wetland of international importance.

== Lake Limbra project ==
The area includes several lakes and wetland areas which provide habitat for native flora and fauna, but since the area has been affected by drought and the use of water from the Murray regulated, much of the plain has remained dry for long periods. Lake Limbra, situated at the northern end of the Chowilla Regional Reserve, is regarded as a sacred site by the local Aboriginal peoples, who used it as a burial site. The lake's geographical location on the eastern end of the floodplain as well as its low-lying altitude meant that in the past, it was first to be filed during flood events.

In March 2021, a three-month project to pump water into Lake Limbra from the Murray River was undertaken by the state Department for Environment and Water, SA Water and a group of First Nations people, using a system of water pumps and cranes. By June, much wildlife was observed in and around the lake, including wetland birds such as ducks, and also shield shrimp, a tiny crustacean adapted to living in desert areas and was able to cope with periodic drying of muddy lakes.
