= Cooltong Conservation Park =

Protected area in South Australia

- IUCN category VI (protected area with sustainable use of natural resources)
- Location within South Australia
- Location: South Australia
- Nearest city: Renmark
- Coordinates: 34°10′37.19″S 140°38′16.8″E
- Area: 37.1 km^{2} (14.3 sq mi)
- Established: 8 April 1993
- Governing body: Department for Environment and Water

Cooltong Conservation Park is a protected area located about 6 kilometres (3.7 miles) west of the town of Renmark in the Riverland of South Australia. The conservation park was proclaimed under the National Parks and Wildlife Act 1972 in 1993 to "preserve quality mallee vegetation and habitat for the mallee bird species that frequent the area, in particular the Malleefowl". As of 2011, the conservation park was described as being "dominated by mallee vegetation, with undulating dunes and shales" and that it is "popular among birdwatchers eager to catch a glimpse of elusive mallee birds". Services provided within the conservation park as of 2011 include bushwalking, picnic grounds and vehicle tracks only accessible by 4WD vehicles. The conservation park is classified as an IUCN Category VI protected area.

== See also ==
- Protected areas of South Australia
- Riverland Biosphere Reserve
- Riverland Mallee Important Bird Area
