= Lake Bonney SE =

Coastal freshwater lake in South Australia

- Coonunda or Canunda
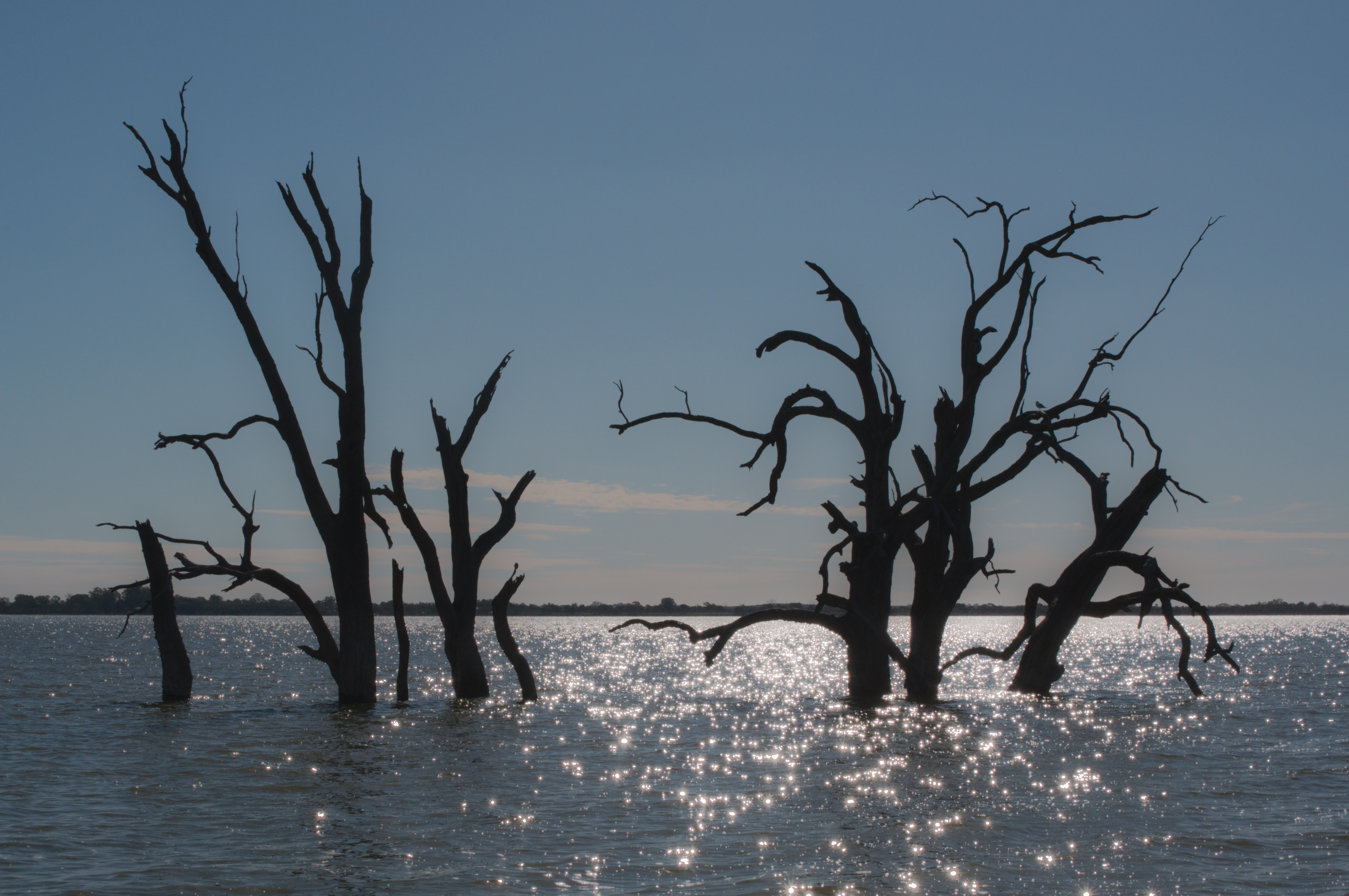

- Location in South Australia
- Location: Canunda, South Australia
- Coordinates: 37°45′56″S 140°20′35″E
- Type: Brackish freshwater
- Primary inflows: Natural inflows
- Primary outflows: Evaporation; Southern Ocean
- Catchment area: 430 km^{2} (170 sq mi)
- Basin countries: Australia
- Max. length: 23 km (14 mi)
- Max. width: 4 km (2.5 mi)
- Surface area: 79 km^{2} (31 sq mi)
- Average depth: 3 m (9.8 ft)

Lake Bonney SE (alternative name: Coonunda or Canunda) is a coastal freshwater lake in the Limestone Coast region of South Australia in the gazetted locality of Canunda. It has a surface area of 79 square kilometres (31 sq mi).

The lake is located 450 km (280 mi) south east of Adelaide and 13 km (8 mi) south west of Millicent. The Canunda National Park lies adjacent to the lake shore.

== Naming ==
The lake was named Lake Bonney in 1844 by George Grey, the then Governor of South Australia.

The name was proposed in 1916 to be changed by the Nomenclature Committee to "Coonunda Lake" but was not actioned without any reason provided. "Coonunda" or "Canunda" is the Aboriginal name for the lake.

In both 1972 and 1981, the District Council of Barmera wrote to the South Australian Government requesting that the lake be renamed with its native name, i.e. "Canunda" or "Coonunda", in order to avoid being confused with the lake in the Riverland of South Australia. In response to the request sent in 1981, the Geographical Names Board renamed both lakes as "Lake Bonney, Riverland" and "Lake Bonney SE" in order to differentiate between the lakes. A further request for a name change sent in 1989 by the District Council of Barmera was not approved by the Geographical Names Board.

== Ash Wednesday bushfires ==
In 1983, a series of bushfires occurred in South Australia. Known as the Ash Wednesday bushfires, they caused widespread damage across the states of Victoria and South Australia. Around 21,000 hectares of forest was lost. As part of the salvage, some 500,000 cubic metres (18,000,000 cu ft) of sawlogs were stored in the lake for future milling. This meant the lake was closed to the public for more than 30 years due to the hazards caused by the stored logs. The lake reopened in 2014 to the public after water quality improved, but restrictions still apply.

== See also ==
- List of lakes of Australia § South Australia
- Lake Bonney Wind Farm
