= Danggali Wilderness Protection Area =

Protected area in South Australia

- IUCN category Ib (wilderness area)
- Location within South Australia
- Location: South Australia
- Nearest city: Renmark
- Coordinates: 33°16′7″S 140°45′28″E
- Area: 2,028.15 km^{2} (783.07 sq mi)
- Established: 28 May 2009
- Governing body: Department for Environment and Water
- Website: Official website

Danggali Wilderness Protection Area is a protected area located about 70 kilometres (43 miles) north of Renmark in South Australia. The wilderness protection area was proclaimed under the Wilderness Protection Act 1992 on 28 May 2009 on land excised from the Danggali Conservation Park . It is classified as an IUCN Category Ib protected area.

== See also ==
- Protected areas of South Australia
- Danggali, South Australia
- Riverland Biosphere Reserve
