= Riverland Biosphere Reserve =

Nature reserve in Australia

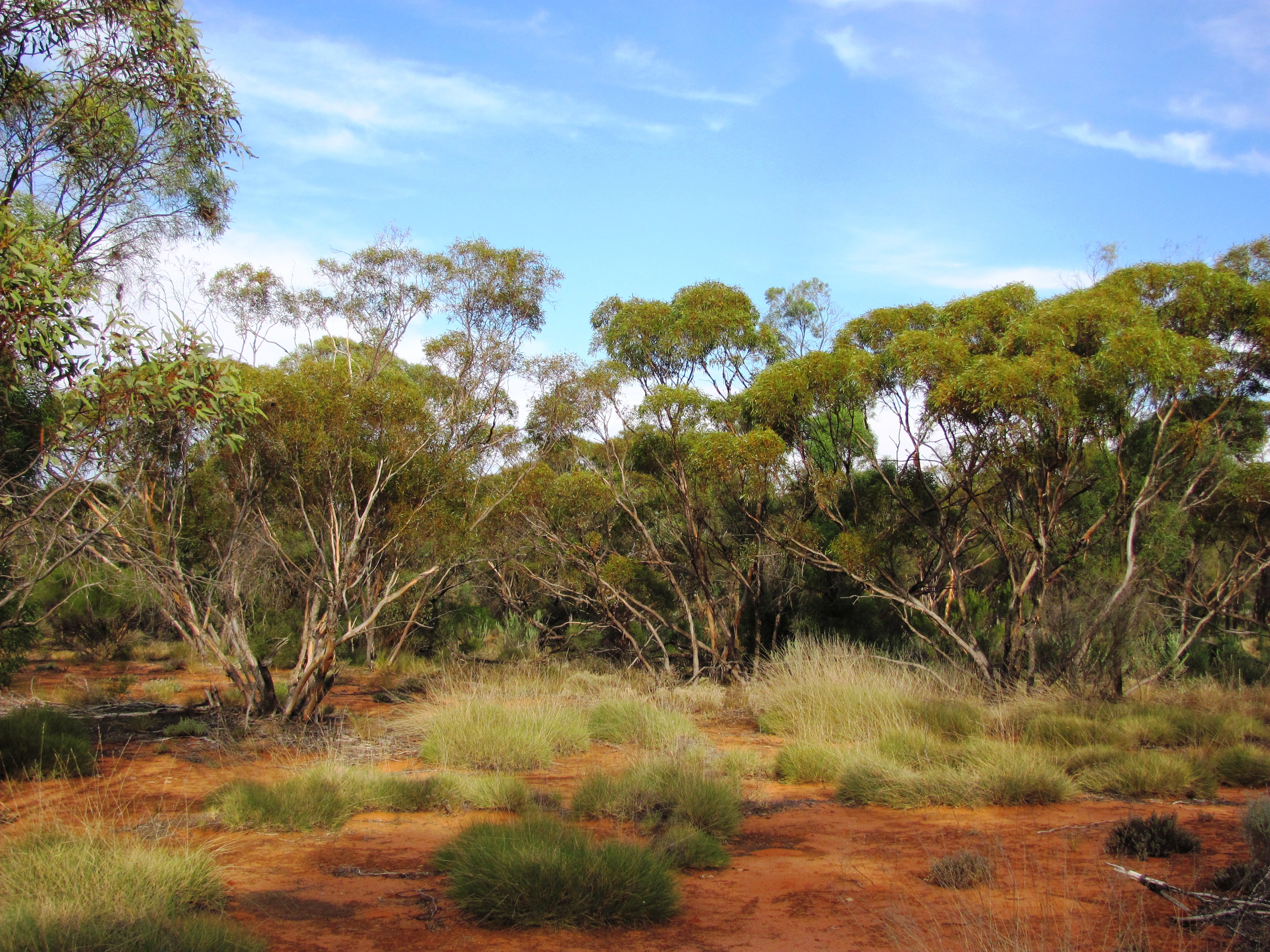
- Mallee woodland at Gluepot Reserve, South Australia

- Location within South Australia
- Location: South Australia
- Nearest city: Berri; Renmark; Paringa
- Coordinates: 33°19′0″S 140°30′0″E
- Area: 9,000 km^{2} (3,500 sq mi)
- Established: 1977

The Riverland Biosphere Reserve, formerly the Bookmark Biosphere Reserve, is a 9,000 square kilometres (3,500 square miles) area of land in eastern South Australia, adjoining the states of New South Wales and Victoria. It is one of 14 biosphere reserves in Australia and is part of the World Network of Biosphere Reserves, being officially recognized and listed by UNESCO in 1977.

== Description ==
The reserve is composed of several mainly contiguous properties that, although having different ownerships and different management purposes, have the joint aim of identifying approaches to ecologically sustainable development in a low-productivity landscape with many shared land-management problems. It lies in the Murray Mallee and the Riverland with the native vegetation predominantly mallee woodland and shrubland, but also including wetlands and riverine communities along the Murray River. The flood plains of the reserve are recognised as internationally significant wetlands for migratory birds under the Ramsar Convention. The reserve is involved in Australia's national recovery plan for the endangered black-eared miner.

The reserve's many component properties include protected areas, pastoral leases and privately owned land such as the following:

- Calperum Station
- Chowilla Regional Reserve
- Chowilla Game Reserve
- Cooltong Conservation Park
- Danggali Conservation Park
- Danggali Wilderness Protection Area
- Gluepot Reserve
- Loch Luna Game Reserve
- Moorook Game Reserve
- Murray River National Park
- Taylorville Station

The reserve is also overlapped by the Riverland Mallee Important Bird Area, an area identified by BirdLife International as being "important" for the conservation of mallee birds and their habitats.

== See also ==
- List of biosphere reserves in Australia
