= Danggali Conservation Park =

Protected area in South Australia

- IUCN category Ia (strict nature reserve)
- Location within South Australia
- Location: South Australia
- Nearest city: Renmark
- Coordinates: 33°30′44″S 140°50′33″E
- Area: 484.16 km^{2} (186.94 sq mi)
- Established: 4 November 1976
- Governing body: Department for Environment and Water
- Website: Official website

Danggali Conservation Park is a protected area located about 65 kilometres (40 miles) north of Renmark in South Australia. The conservation park was proclaimed under the National Parks and Wildlife Act 1972 in 1976. In 2009, a portion of the conservation park was excised to create the Danggali Wilderness Protection Area. The conservation park is classified as an IUCN Category Ia protected area.

== See also ==
- Protected areas of South Australia
- Danggali, South Australia
- Riverland Biosphere Reserve
- Riverland Mallee Important Bird Area
