= Loch Luna Game Reserve =

Protected area in South Australia

- IUCN category VI (protected area with sustainable use of natural resources)
- Location within South Australia
- Location: South Australia
- Nearest city: Kingston-on-Murray
- Coordinates: 34°12′22″S 140°23′12″E
- Area: 20.63 km^{2} (7.97 sq mi)
- Established: 7 November 1985
- Governing body: Department for Environment and Water
- Website: www.environment.sa.gov.au/parks/Find_a_Park/Browse_by_region/Murray_River/Loch_Luna_Moorook_Game_Reserves

Loch Luna Reserve is a protected area covering the floodplain on the north side of the River Murray in South Australia between the towns of Kingston-on-Murray in the west and Cobdogla in the east. It is located about 180 kilometres (110 miles) east north-east of the Adelaide city centre. It was proclaimed on 7 November 1985 with exception to a parcel of land known as Sugarloaf Hill within the boundaries of the game reserve which has been excluded from protection for the purpose of mining activity. The Moorook Game Reserve immediately adjoins the game reserve's southern boundary. It and the Moorook Game Reserve are reported as providing "significant wildlife habitat and are popular recreation sites, particularly for river-based activities and camping". The game reserve is classified as an IUCN Category VI protected area. In 1989, it was listed on the now-defunct Register of the National Estate.

== See also ==
- Duck hunting in South Australia
- Riverland Biosphere Reserve
