= Chowilla Game Reserve =

Protected area in South Australia

- IUCN category VI (protected area with sustainable use of natural resources)
- Location within South Australia
- Location: South Australia
- Nearest city: Renmark
- Coordinates: 33°56′27″S 140°54′41″E
- Area: 18.176 km^{2} (7.018 sq mi)
- Established: 4 April 1993
- Governing body: Department for Environment and Water
- Website: http://www.environment.sa.gov.au/parks/Find_a_Park/Browse_by_region/Murray_River/Chowilla_Game_Reserve_Regional_Reserve

Chowilla Game Reserve is a protected area covering the floodplain on the north side of the River Murray in South Australia from about 8 kilometres (5.0 miles) north-east of Renmark to the New South Wales border. It was proclaimed 8 April 1993 in conjunction with the Chowilla Regional Reserve, after a community consultation process which recommended that "hunting of waterfowl be a permitted activity in selected areas of the Chowilla floodplain". The game reserve is classified as an IUCN Category VI protected area.

The Chowilla floodplain is also protected as part of the Riverland Ramsar site, designated by the Ramsar Convention as a wetland of international importance.

== See also ==
- Chowilla, South Australia
- Duck hunting in South Australia
- List of islands within the Murray River in South Australia
- Riverland Biosphere Reserve
