= Chowilla Regional Reserve =

Protected area in South Australia

- IUCN category VI (protected area with sustainable use of natural resources)
- Location within South Australia
- Location: South Australia
- Nearest city: Berri
- Coordinates: 33°41′47.7″S 140°51′48.9″E
- Area: 752.21 km^{2} (290.43 sq mi)
- Established: 8 April 1993
- Governing body: Department for Environment and Water; Robertson Chowilla Pty Ltd
- Website: http://www.environment.sa.gov.au/parks/Find_a_Park/Browse_by_region/Murray_River/Chowilla_Game_Reserve_Regional_Reserve

Chowilla Regional Reserve is protected area in the Australian state of South Australia located in the gazetted locality of Chowilla about 250 kilometres (160 miles) north-east of the state capital of Adelaide.

The reserve was proclaimed on 8 April 1993 in conjunction with the Chowilla Game Reserve and covers an area of 75,221 hectares (185,880 acres). "It protects and conserves a semi-arid environment adjacent to the Murray River. The dominant land uses of the reserve are pastoral production, conservation of natural and historic features and tourism/recreation." The reserve is also classified as a Category VI protected area by the International Union for Conservation of Nature.

It is situated on the Chowilla floodplain, which is protected as part of the Riverland Ramsar site, designated by the Ramsar Convention as a wetland of international importance.

The area includes several lakes and wetland areas which provide habitat for native flora and fauna, but since the area has been affected by drought and the use of water from the Murray regulated, much of the plain has remained dry for long periods. Lake Limbra, situated at the northern end of the reserve, is regarded as a sacred site by the local Aboriginal peoples, who used it as a burial site. The lake's geographical location on the eastern end of the floodplain as well as its low-lying altitude meant that in the past, it was first to be filled during flood events.

In March 2021, a three-month project to pump water into Lake Limbra from the Murray River was undertaken by the state Department for Environment and Water, SA Water and a group of First Nations people, using a system of water pumps and cranes. By June, much wildlife was observed in and around the lake, including wetland birds such as ducks, and also shield shrimp, a tiny crustacean adapted to living in desert areas and was able to cope with periodic drying of muddy lakes.

== See also ==
- Protected areas of South Australia
- Regional reserves of South Australia
- Regional Reserve (Australia)
- Riverland Biosphere Reserve
