= Katarapko Game Reserve =

Protected area in South Australia

- Location within South Australia
- Location: South Australia
- Nearest city: Loxton
- Coordinates: 34°24′58″S 140°33′10″E
- Area: 40.63 km^{2} (15.69 sq mi)
- Established: 5 March 1970
- Governing body: Department of Environment and Planning (as of 20 June 1991)

.

Katarapko Game Reserve was a protected area in the Australian state of South Australia located about 180 kilometres (110 mi) north-east of the state capital of Adelaide and on the opposite side of the Murray River to the town of Loxton.

The game reserve consisted of the following land both on Katarapko Island within the floodplain of the Murray River and to the island’s immediate west and north both on the floodplain and adjacent high ground - sections 73 to 79, 89 and 91 to 94 in the Cobdogla Irrigation Area in the cadastral unit of the Hundred of Katarapko, and section 1958 in the Berri Irrigation Area, “Out of Hundreds.” As of 1980, the game reserve covered an area of 40.63 square kilometres (15.69 sq mi).

The land first received protected area status in 1970 when the full extent of Katarapko Island received protection under two separate state statutes: one part of the island (i.e. section 73) was declared simultaneously as a fauna conservation reserve and as a game reserve under the Fauna Conservation Act 1964 while the remainder (i.e. section 74) was declared as the Katarapko National Park under the National Park Act 1966. In 1972, the entire island was declared as a game reserve under the National Parks and Wildlife Act 1972 with the name, the Katarapko Game Reserve.

The boundaries of the game reserve were varied in the years 1973, 1979, 1983 and 1985 by the addition of land from the floodplain to the west and to the north of Katarapko Island, and from the high ground to the west of the island.

In 1984, a draft management plan was offered for public comment. However, this document did not proceed because of “significant public opposition” to proposals for “roads, a visitor centre and a staff residence” located within the game reserve. The proposed works were not included in the management plan for the game reserve’s successor, the Murray River National Park, which published in 1994 for the additional reason of cost due to the “present stringent economic climate.”

On 20 June 1991, the game reserve was abolished, and all of its land holding was constituted under the National Parks and Wildlife Act 1972 as the Murray River National Park.

In 1980, the game reserve was described as follows:

Katarapko Game Reserve is the largest conservation reserve along the River Murray in South Australia. It is an important area for the management and conservation of waterfowl, particularly native game species such as ducks. The reserve is open for a limited duck shooting season and is a popular recreation area, particularly for fishing.

Katarapko Game Reserve is situated on Katarapko Island in the River Murray and an adjacent area of river floodplain, opposite the town of Loxton. It has a number of natural backwaters which are lined with very large and attractive red gums. River box (Eucalyptus largiflorens) woodland and lignum (Muehlenbeckia cunninghamii) low open shrubland occupy low lying areas subject to occasional inundation. Some horse-shoe lagoons (ox-bow lakes) occur in the central eastern portion of the Island.

A portion is managed as an evaporation basin, which can lead to artificially high water levels and these levels are now controlled, to prevent death of gums by drowning. Some waterfowl crops have been planted in a small area of the reserve.

In 1980, it was listed on the now-defunct Register of the National Estate.

== See also ==
- Protected areas of South Australia
