= Holder, South Australia =

Holder South Australia
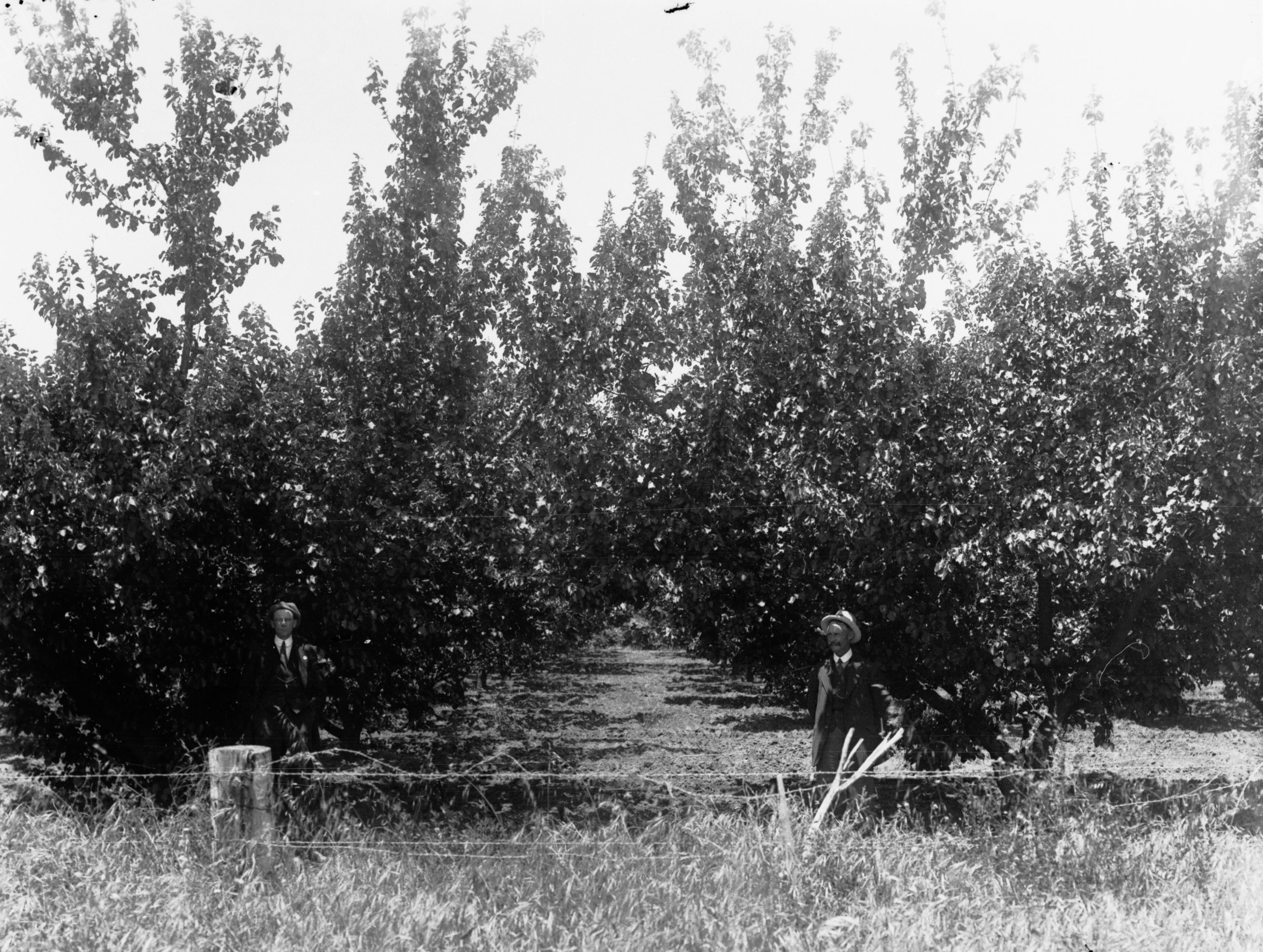
- Apricot orchard at Holder, planted in September 1897

- Coordinates: 34.17°S 140.03°E
- Population: 123 (SAL 2021)
- Established: 1894
- Postcode(s): 5330
- LGA(s): District Council of Loxton Waikerie
- State electorate(s): Chaffey
- Federal division(s): Barker
Localities around Holder:
	Taylorville
Waikerie	Holder	Lowbank
		Kanni

Holder is a locality in the Riverland region of South Australia. It lies on the inside of a bend in the Murray River east (upstream) of Waikerie. Holder is bounded on the south side by the Sturt Highway and includes the Waikerie Airport and Maize Island Lagoon Conservation Park. The locality includes low-lying wetlands near river level and rising and higher ground up to the level at the top of the Murray cliffs where the airport and highway are. The sloping and higher ground is used for vineyards and fruit orchards, irrigated from the river. The school opened in 1925 and closed in 1991.

Holder Settlement was established in 1894 and continued as a Village Settlement when that legislation was introduced. The Holder Settlement started out with one or two stone buildings, remnants of the earlier Waikerai Station. One of these immediately became the school house, public hall and church of the settlement The settlers travelled by train to Morgan then by the paddlesteamer Ellen to the site of their new home. Once they had cleared land to plant a crop and build the village, it was named Holder after Sir Frederick Holder, proclaimed on 26 July 1894. The town had 19 stone cottages, five of wood and iron, a post office, store, bakery, school and blacksmith. After initially flourishing, the settlement was officially abandoned on 27 August 1903, with the assets auctioned and the land leased to F. C. Howard from the Waikerie settlement.
