= Golden Heights =

Golden Heights may refer to:

- Golden Heights, Alberta, a locality in the Sturgeon County near Edmonton
- Golden Heights, Florida, a neighborhood in the City of Fort Lauderdale
- Golden Heights, South Australia, a locality west of Waikerie in the Riverland

== See also ==
- Golan Heights
