= Ramco =

Ramco may refer to:

Educational institutions

- Ramco Institute of Technology, an engineering college in south India

Commercial organizations

- Ramco Systems, a software products and services provider in India
- Ramco-Gershenson Properties Trust, a real estate investment trust

Places

- Ramco, South Australia, a town and a locality
- Ramco Point Conservation Park, protected area in South Australia
