= Qualco, South Australia =

Qualco South Australia
- Coordinates: 34°06′24″S 139°53′23″E
- Population: 59 (2016 census)
- Established: 28 September 2000
- Postcode(s): 5322
- LGA(s): District Council of Loxton Waikerie
- State electorate(s): Chaffey
- Federal division(s): Barker
Localities around Qualco:
	Taylorville
	Qualco	Taylorville
Sunlands		Ramco

Qualco is a locality in South Australia. It is on the inside of a bend of the Murray River downstream from Waikerie, and the only land border is the main road from Waikerie to Cadell, with Sunlands on the other side of the road. The other side of the river is Taylorville.

Land use in Qualco is predominantly irrigated vineyards and orchards, along with some cereal crops. The river is bounded by wide flats that flood during periods of high flow.
