= Sunlands, South Australia =

Sunlands South Australia
- Coordinates: 34°08′11″S 139°52′41″E
- Population: 356 (SAL 2021)
- Established: 28 September 2000
- Postcode(s): 5322
- Time zone: ACST (UTC+9:30)
  - Summer (DST): ACST (UTC+10:30)
- Location: 10 km (6 mi) west of Waikerie; 20 km (12 mi) southeast of Cadell
- LGA(s): District Council of Loxton Waikerie
- County: Albert
- State electorate(s): Chaffey
- Federal division(s): Barker
Mean max temp	Mean min temp	Annual rainfall
25.3 °C; 78 °F	9.3 °C; 49 °F	281.5 mm 11.1 in
Localities around Sunlands:
Cadell	Qualco	Qualco
Cadell; Stockyard Plain	Sunlands	Taylorville
Stockyard Plain	Stockyard Plain; Ramco Heights	Ramco
- Footnotes: Adjoining localities

Sunlands is a locality on the left bank of the Murray River, 10 kilometres (6.2 mi) west of Waikerie, South Australia. The Waikerie Golf and Country Club course is in Sunlands.

The current boundaries of Sunlands were set in September 2000 for the long established name. They include the Sunlands South and Sunlands North irrigation areas. Most of the irrigated areas of Sunlands are planted with citrus orchards.

Qualco lies on the inside of a bend in the river. Sunlands has a short river frontage at the upstream (eastern) end of Qualco, downstream of Ramco. Sunlands extends almost to the river at the northern end of Qualco, bounded by the Cadell Valley Road, in the vicinity of the area known as Oxford Landing.

Oxford Landing Estates is a major wine producer in the area.

Sunlands is located within the federal division of Barker, the state Electoral district of Chaffey and the local government area of the District Council of Loxton Waikerie.

== See also ==
- Ramco Point Conservation Park
