= Maize Island Lagoon Conservation Park =

Protected area in South Australia

- IUCN category III (natural monument or feature)
- Location within South Australia
- Location: South Australia, Holder
- Nearest city: Waikerie
- Coordinates: 34°10′04″S 140°01′06″E
- Area: 2.14 km^{2} (0.83 sq mi)
- Established: 1 December 1966
- Visitors: “popular” (in 1994)
- Governing body: Department for Environment and Water
- Website: Official website

Maize Island Lagoon Conservation Park is a protected area in the Australian state of South Australia located in the locality of Holder about 155 kilometres (96 mi) north-east of the state capital of Adelaide and about 2 kilometres (1.2 mi) east of the Waikerie.

The conservation park consists of the following land located on the southern side of the Murray River in the cadastral unit of the Hundred of Holder – sections 365, 427, 496, 497, 529 and 530.

The land first received protected area status in respect to sections 365 and 427 as a fauna reserve proclaimed under the Fauna Conservation Act 1964 on 1 December 1966. On 27 April 1972, the fauna reserve was reconstituted as the Maize Island Lagoon Conservation Park under the National Parks and Wildlife Act 1972. On 24 March 1977, sections 496 and 497 were added to the conservation park followed by sections 529 and 530 on 15 November 1984. As of 2019, it covered an area of 2.14 square kilometres (0.83 sq mi).

In 1982, the conservation park was described as follows:

A small park preserving Murray River flood plain habitats, including low lying lagoon areas. A diverse avifauna frequents the park, including the uncommon regent parrot…

Riverflats and lagoons with Eucalyptus camaldulensis and E. largiflorens woodland to open woodland. The principal understorey species are Muehlenbeckia cunninghamii and Eremophila divaricata generally in low lying areas with Dodonaea angustissima and Acacia stenophylla forming tall shrublands on slightly higher ground. A ground cover of introduced and native grasses is found in many areas. Areas of dense, young E. camaldulensis growth are found bordering some of the shallow lagoon areas…

This park contains areas showing only minor disturbance through to areas degraded by the effects of rabbits and vehicular traffic. Introduced grass species are common.

The conservation park is classified as an IUCN Category III protected area. In 1982, it was listed on the now-defunct Register of the National Estate.

== See also ==
- Protected areas of South Australia
