= Taylorville, South Australia =

Taylorville South Australia
- Coordinates: 34°6′S 139°58′E
- Population: 263 (SAL 2021)
- LGA(s): District Council of Loxton Waikerie; Mid Murray Council
- State electorate(s): Chaffey
- Federal division(s): Barker
Localities around Taylorville:
Stuart	Markaranka
Cadell	Taylorville	Pooginook
Qualco	Ramco, Waikerie, Holder	Lowbank

Taylorville is a locality in the Riverland region of South Australia. It is on the north (right) bank of the Murray River opposite Waikerie and several smaller settlements. The locality is predominantly between the Goyder Highway and the Murray River, with several small areas on the other side of the highway. Taylorville Road connects the highway to the cable ferry across the river to Waikerie.

Land use in Taylorville includes irrigated vineyards and orchards.
