= Ramco Point Conservation Park =

Protected area in South Australia

- IUCN category III (natural monument or feature)
- Location within South Australia
- Location: South Australia
- Nearest city: Ramco
- Coordinates: 34°09′12″S 139°54′49″E
- Area: 30 ha (74 acres)
- Established: 22 June 2006
- Governing body: Department for Environment and Water

Ramco Point Conservation Park is a protected area located in the Australian state of South Australia in the locality of Sunlands about 150 kilometres (93 mi) north-east of the state capital of Adelaide and about 7 kilometres (4.3 mi) north-west of the municipal seat of Waikerie.

The conservation park consists of crown land described as “Allotment 4 of DP 66666” in the cadastral unit of the Hundred of Waikerie. It came into existence on 22 June 2006 by proclamation under the National Parks and Wildlife Act 1972. It is located at the east end of Sunlands between Ramco Road in the west and the bank of the River Murray in the east. As of 2016, it covered an area of 30 hectares (74 acres).

The name, which was approved on 20 October 2005, is derived from a geographical feature called Ramco Point, which is located close to the conservation park. One of the other suggested names, the "Emil Lochart Conservation Park", was proposed by the District Council of Loxton Waikerie. The name Ramco is of Aboriginal origin and is reported in the papers of Norman Tindale, the anthropologist, as being derived from bokarampko, the Aboriginal name for Ramco Lagoon, located immediately south of the conservation park in the locality of Ramco.

The land within the conservation park was part of the Waikerie Forest Reserve, which was proclaimed under the Forestry Act 1950 and which existed from 19 March 1992 until 25 November 2004.

The conservation park is classified as an IUCN Category III protected area.

== See also ==
- Protected areas of South Australia
- Riverland Mallee Important Bird Area
