= Markaranka =

Markaranka South Australia
- Coordinates: 34.03°S 139.94°E
- Population: 27 (2016 census)
- Postcode(s): 5330
- Location: 17 km (11 mi) northwest of Waikerie; 29 km (18 mi) east of Morgan
- LGA(s): District Council of Loxton Waikerie
- State electorate(s): Chaffey
- Federal division(s): Barker
Localities around Markaranka:
Westons Flat		Taylorville Station
Stuart	Markaranka
	Taylorville	Pooginook

Markaranka is a locality in the Riverland region of South Australia. It is north of the Murray River near Waikerie, South Australia.

The boundaries were set in September 2000 and adjusted on 26 April 2013 to ensure that Westons Flat pastoral run is entirely in Westons Flat and Glenlock Station is entirely in Markaranka. It lies immediately north of the Goyder Highway midway between Morgan and Barmera.

The southern part of the locality contains some orchards, vineyards and improved pasture. The northern part is unimproved grazing land. There are several farms located in the area with a significant part of the land owned by the prominent Lunn Family. Founded by Murray Lunn, the Lunn family account for over $30,000,000 worth of land and assets in the area.
