= Bakara Conservation Park =

Protected area in South Australia

- IUCN category Ia (strict nature reserve)
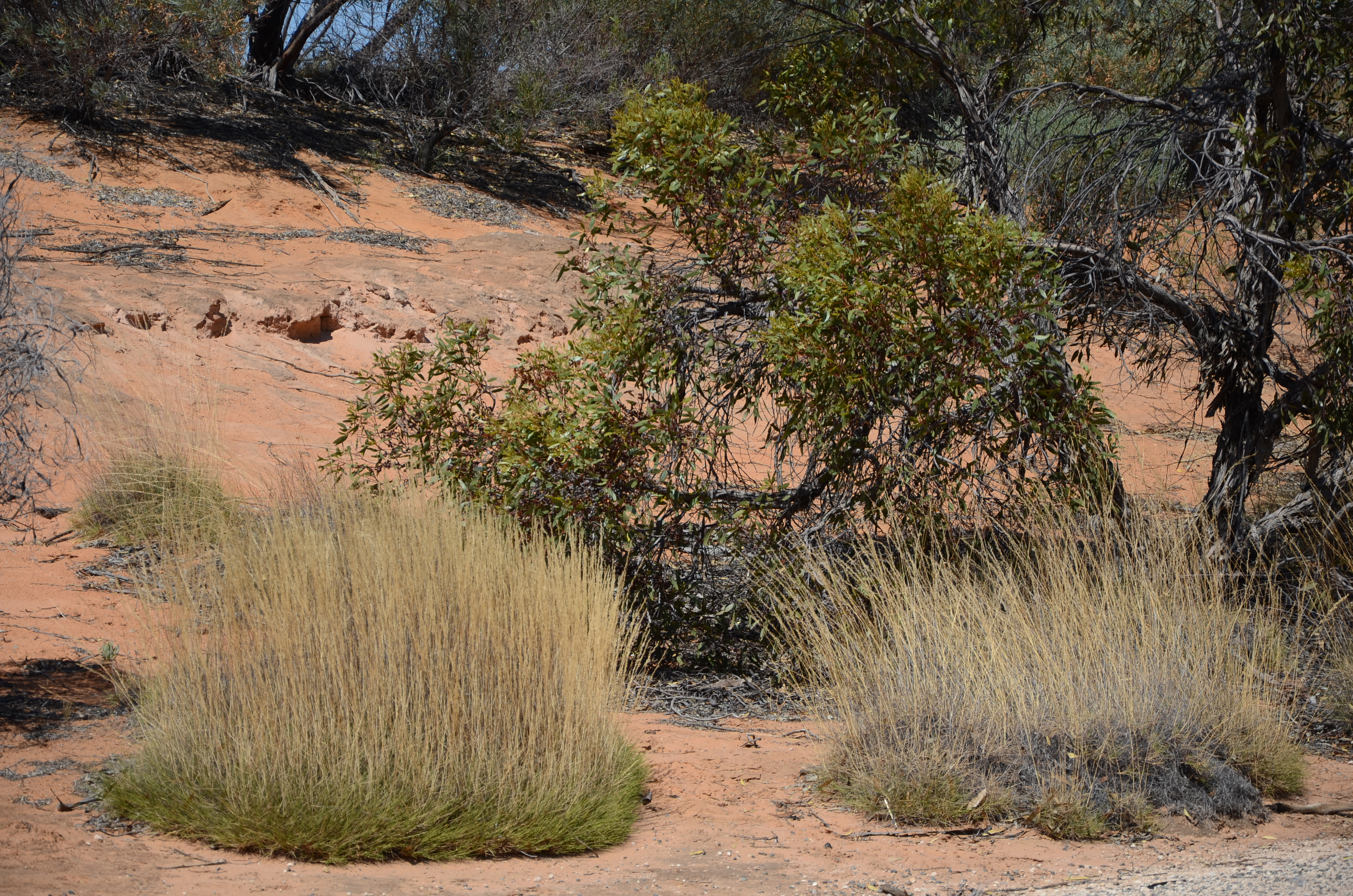
- Bakara Conservation Park, January 2015

- Location within South Australia
- Location: South Australia, Maggea
- Nearest city: Maggea
- Coordinates: 34°30′45″S 139°56′16″E
- Area: 20.29 km^{2} (7.83 sq mi)
- Established: 15 May 1986
- Governing body: Department for Environment and Water

Bakara Conservation Park is a protected area of mallee scrub in the Murray Mallee region of South Australia. It is located in the locality of Maggea on the southern side of the Stott Highway.

The conservation park consists of land in sections 54 and 55 in the cadastral unit of the Hundred of Bakara. Section 55 was compulsory acquired by the Government of South Australia in 1983 and was proclaimed on 15 May 1986 as a conservation park under the National Parks and Wildlife Act 1972. It was extended to the north by the addition of Section 54 on 6 August 2009. As of 2015, it covered an area of 20.29 square kilometres (7.83 sq mi).

The conservation park provides habitat for malleefowl, and local landholders are involved in active fox and rabbit control in the conservation park and nearby farmland.

It is classified as an IUCN Category Ia protected area, meaning that it is protected from all but light human use.
