= Waikerie Airport =

- IATA: none; ICAO: YWKI

Summary
- Airport type: Public
- Owner/Operator: Loxton/Waikerie District Council
- Location: Holder, South Australia
- Elevation AMSL: 138 ft / 42 m
- Coordinates: 34°11′00″S 140°01′48″E

Map
- Location in South Australia

Runways
Direction	Length		Surface
Direction	m	ft	Surface
08/26	960	3,150	Asphalt
02/20	832	2,730	Gravel
- Sources: Australian AIP

Waikerie Airport (ICAO: YWKI) is located 2 nautical miles (3.7 km; 2.3 mi) east of the town of Waikerie in the locality of Holder, South Australia.

The flat dry terrain in the area provides good thermals for gliding. The airport is home to the Waikerie Gliding Club. Waikerie hosted the 14th World Gliding Championships in 1974.

== See also ==
- List of airports in South Australia
