= Stuart, South Australia =

Stuart South Australia
- Coordinates: 33.9°S 139.8°E
- Population: 15 (SAL 2021)
- Gazetted: 27 March 2003
- LGA(s): Mid Murray Council
- State electorate(s): Chaffey
- Federal division(s): Barker
Localities around Stuart:
Lindley	Bunyung	Westons Flat
	Stuart	Markaranka
Morgan	Cadell, Cadell Lagoon	Taylorville

Stuart is a locality in the Riverland region of South Australia.

== Nomenclature ==
Stuart gets its name from the Hundred of Stuart, which in turn was named after John McDouall Stuart in 1860. The locality boundary is almost identical to the hundred boundary, except that the southeastern part of the Hundred is in the locality of Taylorville and the southwestern corner of the hundred in the locality of Morgan.

== Transport ==
Stuart is crossed by the Goyder Highway and bounded on its southern side by the Murray River. Despite the river flowing past the south of the locality, it is in an area of very low rainfall not reliable for farming. No intensive irrigation has been set up in the area.

== Energy ==
Stuart is the site of ElectraNet's North West Bend electricity substation. If they are constructed, Stuart will be crossed by the Project EnergyConnect electricity interconnector joining the South Australian and New South Wales electricity grids. It is also proposed to be the site of the Riverland Solar Storage solar power station.
