= Lowbank =

- Town
- Coordinates: 34°11′18″S 140°04′43″E
- Country: Australia
- State: South Australia
- Region: Murray and Mallee
- LGA: District Council of Loxton Waikerie

Government
  - State electorate: Chaffey
  - Federal division: Barker

Population
  - Total: 22 (SAL 2021)
- Postcode: 5330
- County: Albert
Localities around Lowbank
Taylorville	Pooginook	Pooginook
Holder	Lowbank	Good Hope Landing
Waikerie	Kanni	Kanni

Lowbank is a locality in South Australia's riverland. It is between the Sturt Highway and the left (south) bank of the Murray River east of Waikerie.

The highway is over 40 metres (130 ft) higher elevation than the river level, but only a kilometre away. Lowbank has a slope rather than a cliff. Where there are relatively flat areas on the high ground, they are used for vineyards, however much of Lowbank is natural scrub on the slope. There are several historic landing sites along the river in Lowbank. Lowbank Primary School opened in 1915, but is now closed. The boundaries of Lowbank include the Island Flat shack site. Despite being almost 400 kilometres (250 mi) by river from the sea, water level is often only 6.1 metres (20 ft) above sea level, maintained by Lock 2.

St Paul's Lutheran Church was built in 1913 and is next to the Sturt Highway.
