= Pooginook Conservation Park =

Protected area in South Australia

- IUCN category Ia (strict nature reserve)
- Location within South Australia
- Location: South Australia
- Nearest city: Waikerie
- Coordinates: 34°05′38″S 140°06′13″E
- Area: 28.51 km^{2} (11.01 sq mi)
- Established: 7 May 1970
- Visitors: ‘moderate’ (in 1994)
- Governing body: Department for Environment and Water
- Website: Official website

Pooginook Conservation Park (formerly the Pooginook National Park) is a protected area located in the Australian state of South Australia in the locality of Pooginook about 166 kilometres (103 mi) north-east of the state capital of Adelaide and about 12 kilometres (7.5 mi) north-east of the town of Waikerie.

The conservation park consists of land in Sections 7, 8 and 14 in the cadastral unit of the Hundred of Pooginook. It is bounded on the southern side of sections 8 and 14 by the Goyder Highway. It was proclaimed on 7 May 1970 as the Pooginook National Park under the National Parks Act 1966. On 27 April 1972, it was reconstituted as the Pooginook Conservation Park under the National Parks and Wildlife Act 1972. As of 2018, it covered an area of 28.51 square kilometres (11.01 sq mi).

In 1980, the conservation park was described as follows:

This park preserves an area of mallee scrub and low sand dune terrain, providing habitat for a diverse flora and fauna. Species of particular significance found in the Park include the mallee fowl, pink cockatoo, regent parrot, black-eared miner and the black honeyeater. The hairy-nosed wombat was introduced to this park and is believed to be surviving still… The northern portion of the park is dense mallee scrub on a sandy plain with low parallel dunes. The principal species is Eucalyptus socialis with scattered Myoporum platycarpum and Santalum murrayanum. Dominant species in the understorey are Triodia irritans and Eremophila glabra. The southern half of the park is more open with some mallee of the above species and bushes of Acacia spp, Grevillea pterosperma and Leptospermum coriaceum… The northern part of the park is in little modified condition while the southern part is regenerating from past grazing and shows remnants of the old clearings of an abandoned farm. Goats and rabbits are a problem.

As of 1994, visitation was described as being “moderate”.

The conservation park is classified as an IUCN Category Ia protected area. In 1980, it was listed on the now-defunct Register of the National Estate.

== See also ==
- Protected areas of South Australia
