= Kanni, South Australia =

Kanni South Australia
- Coordinates: 34.258867509459606°S 140.0067134829496°E
- Population: 36 (SAL 2021)
- Postcode(s): 5330
- Elevation: 59 m (194 ft)
- Location: 84 km (52 mi) north east of Renmark
- LGA(s): District Council of Loxton Waikerie
Localities around Kanni:
Waikerie	Lowbank	Good Hope Landing
Waikerie	Kanni	Woolpunda
New Well	Holder Siding	Holder Siding

Kanni is a locality in southeast South Australia located 150km northeast of Adelaide.

The name of Kanni is derived from an Aboriginal native term for 'you stay here'. It was once a siding on the Waikerie railway line but it was closed in 1990.
