= New Well, South Australia =

New Well South Australia
- Coordinates: 34.386°S 139.912°E
- Population: 21 (SAL 2021)
- Postcode(s): 5357
- Location: 25 km (16 mi) south of Waikerie; 35 km (22 mi) east of Blanchetown
- LGA(s): District Council of Loxton Waikerie
- State electorate(s): Chaffey
- Federal division(s): Barker
Localities around New Well:
Stockyard Plain	Waikerie	Kannie
Notts Well	New Well	Holder Siding, Boolgun
Naidia		Maggea

New Well is a settlement in South Australia, on sandy cropping country in the northern Murray Mallee region, southwest of Waikerie. A school opened in 1919 is no longer in use. New Well Hall opened in 1926, along with a new store.
