= Caliph, South Australia =

Locality in South Australia

Caliph South Australia
- Coordinates: 34.6586°S 140.2763°E
- Population: 3 (SAL 2021)
- Established: May 1926
- Postcode(s): 5310
- Location: 41 km (25 mi) southwest of Loxton, South Australia; 184 km (114 mi) east of Adelaide
- LGA(s): District Council of Loxton Waikerie
- State electorate(s): Chaffey
- Federal division(s): Barker
Localities around Caliph:
	Wunkar	Pyap West
Mantung	Caliph	Veitch
Mindarie	Wanbi	Alawoona

Caliph is a locality in the Murray Mallee region of South Australia. Its name was derived from a variety of wheat grown in the area.

Caliph was a station on the Moorook railway line which opened in 1925 and closed in 1971. The town was surveyed in May 1926 but no longer exists. The former community hall is a stone building near the railway station, but is no longer in use.

The next railway station north of Caliph was Bayah (where the railway crossed Mindarie Road) which is now included in the locality of Caliph. The station of Tuscan was where the railway crossed Farr Road, on the northern boundary of Caliph. The adjacent former town is now included in the locality of Wunkar. No infrastructure remains at either station.

== Climate ==
Climate data for Caliph, elevation 68 m (223 ft), (1981–2003 normals, extremes 1974–2003)
Month	Jan	Feb	Mar	Apr	May	Jun	Jul	Aug	Sep	Oct	Nov	Dec	Year
Record high °C (°F)	46.6 (115.9)	45.5 (113.9)	42.4 (108.3)	38.2 (100.8)	31.1 (88.0)	25.0 (77.0)	28.3 (82.9)	30.0 (86.0)	35.7 (96.3)	40.5 (104.9)	44.2 (111.6)	44.4 (111.9)	46.6 (115.9)
Mean daily maximum °C (°F)	31.7 (89.1)	31.6 (88.9)	27.9 (82.2)	23.4 (74.1)	19.2 (66.6)	16.0 (60.8)	15.3 (59.5)	17.0 (62.6)	20.3 (68.5)	23.7 (74.7)	27.2 (81.0)	29.6 (85.3)	23.6 (74.5)
Mean daily minimum °C (°F)	14.0 (57.2)	14.2 (57.6)	11.8 (53.2)	8.6 (47.5)	6.7 (44.1)	4.8 (40.6)	3.9 (39.0)	4.2 (39.6)	5.8 (42.4)	7.7 (45.9)	10.5 (50.9)	12.5 (54.5)	8.7 (47.7)
Record low °C (°F)	4.4 (39.9)	4.0 (39.2)	3.0 (37.4)	−0.2 (31.6)	−3.0 (26.6)	−5.8 (21.6)	−6.6 (20.1)	−4.2 (24.4)	−3.5 (25.7)	−1.0 (30.2)	0.0 (32.0)	3.3 (37.9)	−6.6 (20.1)
Average precipitation mm (inches)	17.4 (0.69)	12.7 (0.50)	12.0 (0.47)	18.4 (0.72)	22.2 (0.87)	26.3 (1.04)	30.9 (1.22)	28.5 (1.12)	28.8 (1.13)	26.2 (1.03)	22.7 (0.89)	24.6 (0.97)	270.5 (10.65)
Average precipitation days (≥ 0.2 mm)	2.6	2.3	2.7	4.0	6.7	8.4	9.9	10.0	7.7	6.3	4.6	4.3	69.5
Source: Australian Bureau of Meteorology (precipitation 1981–2010)
