= Mantung, South Australia =

Mantung South Australia
- Coordinates: 34°35′22″S 140°04′35″E
- Population: 18 (SAL 2021)
- Established: 8 July 1915 (town); 11 November 1999 (locality)
- Postcode(s): 5308
- Time zone: ACST (UTC+9:30)
  - Summer (DST): ACDT (UTC+10:30)
- Location: 140 km (87 mi) E of Adelaide; 58 km (36 mi) NE of Karoonda; 48 km (30 mi) SW of Loxton
- LGA(s): District Council of Karoonda East Murray; District Council of Loxton Waikerie
- Region: Murray and Mallee
- County: Albert
- State electorate(s): Chaffey; Hammond
- Federal division(s): Barker
Mean max temp	Mean min temp	Annual rainfall
23.6 °C; 74 °F	8.7 °C; 48 °F	271.1 mm 10.7 in
Localities around Mantung:
Maggea	Maggea; Wunkar	Wunkar
Maggea; Mercunda	Mantung	Wunkar; Caliph
Mercunda	Mindarie	Mindarie
- Footnotes: Locations; Adjoining localities

Mantung is a town and a locality in the Australian state of South Australia located in the state's south-east about 140 kilometres (87 mi) east of the state capital of Adelaide, and about 58 kilometres (36 mi) north-east and about 48 kilometres (30 mi) south-west respectively of the municipal seats of Karoonda and Loxton.

"Mantung" is reported as the Aboriginal name of a waterhole in the area. A school opened there in 1921 and closed in 1944.

Mantung was one of the towns along the Waikerie railway line after it opened in 1914. The town was surveyed in 1915. Despite the railway closing around 1990, the town hall has continued to be used by the community.

The historic Elizabeth Well Ruins are listed on the South Australian Heritage Register.

Mantung is located within the federal division of Barker, the state electoral districts of Chaffey and Hammond, and the local government areas of the District Council of Karoonda East Murray and the District Council of Loxton Waikerie.

== Events ==
Mantung annually welcomes more than 100 people to the Mantung Community Hall for the observance of the ANZAC Dawn Service.

== See also ==
- Hundred of Mantung
