= Wunkar =

Town in the Murray Lands of Australia

- Town
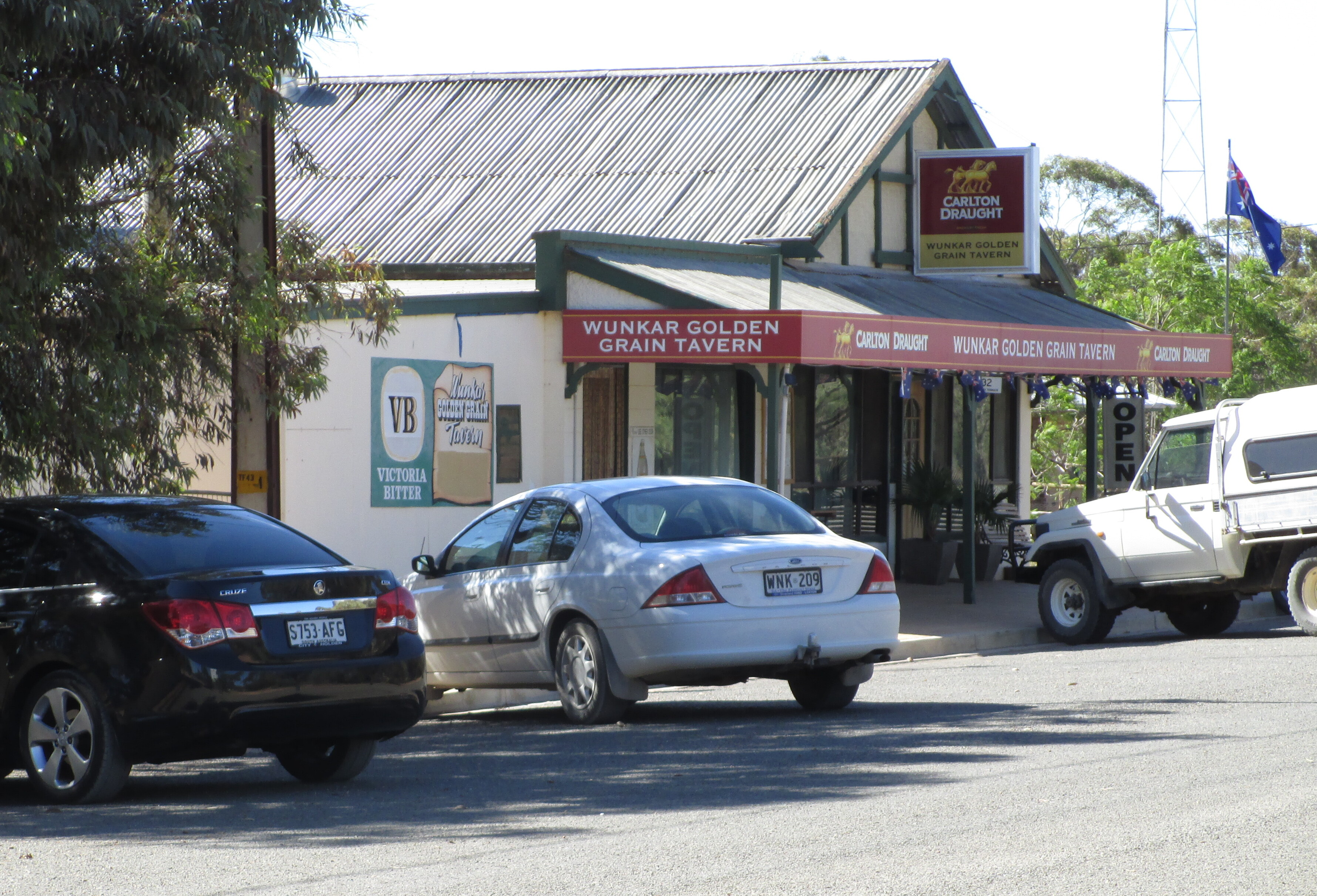
- The Golden Grain Tavern in Wunkar's main street, near the town's grain silos

- Coordinates: 34.489°S 140.3°E
- Country: Australia
- State: South Australia
- LGA: District Council of Loxton Waikerie
- Location: 27 km (17 mi) W of Loxton
- Established: 1925

Government
  - State electorate: Chaffey
  - Federal division: Barker

Population
  - Total: 51 (SAL 2021)
- Postcode: 5311
Localities around Wunkar
Boolgun	Wappilka	Pyap
Maggea	Wunkar	Loxton
Mantung	Caliph	Pyap West

Wunkar is a small town in the Murray Mallee region of South Australia. Wunkar lies adjacent to the Stott Highway approximately 27 km west of Loxton. Wunkar was originally a station on the Moorook railway line. The town was surveyed in 1926 after the railway station name was approved in 1925. The railway closed in 1971. There were bulk grain silos at the former railway station, which were demolished in 2024. The school opened in 1925 and closed in 1973.

The southern boundary of the locality of Wunkar on Farr Road includes the former town and railway siding of Tuscan. No infrastructure remains there. In its day, Tuscan had a sawmill and a busy railway siding, but no school. Towards the northern edge of the locality is the site of the former siding of Parrelun railway station, renamed to Myrla in 1925. Myrla had a school opened in 1920. No evidence of it remains today.
