= District Council of Loxton Waikerie =

- Local government area
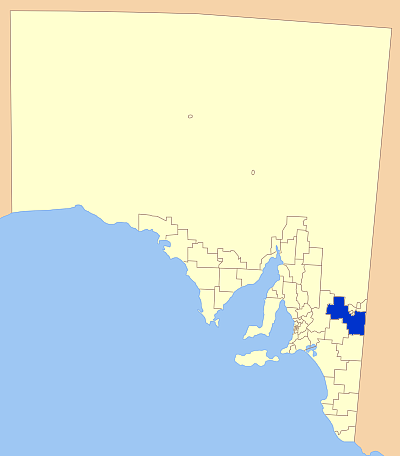
- Location of the District Council of Loxton Waikerie

- Interactive map of District Council of Loxton Waikerie
- Coordinates: 34.4454°S 140.7733°E
- Country: Australia
- State: South Australia
- Region: Murray and Mallee
- Established: 3 May 1997
- Council seat: Loxton

Government
  - Mayor: Leon Stasinowsky
  - State electorate: Chaffey
  - Federal division: Barker

Area
  - Total: 7,957 km^{2} (3,072 sq mi)

Population
  - Total: 11,666 (LGA 2021)
  - Density: 1.466/km^{2} (3.80/sq mi)
- Website: District Council of Loxton Waikerie
LGAs around District Council of Loxton Waikerie
Outback Communities Authority	Renmark Paringa	Mildura (Vic)
Mid Murray	District Council of Loxton Waikerie	Mildura (Vic)
Karoonda East Murray	Southern Mallee	Mildura (Vic)

The District Council of Loxton Waikerie provides local government in the Murray Mallee region of South Australia. The council seat is at Loxton; a branch office is at Waikerie.

The council was formed on 3 May 1997 as an amalgamation of the District Council of Brown's Well, the District Council of Loxton and the District Council of Waikerie.

It includes the towns and localities of Alawoona, Boolgun, Bakara Well, Billiatt, Bookpurnong, Bugle Hut, Caliph, Devlins Pound, Golden Heights, Good Hope Landing, Holder, Holder Siding, Kanni, Kingston on Murray, Kringin, Loxton, Loxton North, Lowbank, Maggea, Malpas, Markaranka, Meribah, Moorook, Moorook South, Naidia, New Residence, New Well, Notts Well, Paisley, Paruna, Pata, Peebinga, Pooginook, Pyap, Pyap West, Qualco, Ramco, Ramco Heights, Schell Well, Stockyard Plain, Sunlands, Taldra, Taplan, Taylorville, Taylorville Station, Veitch, Waikerie, Wappilka, Wigley Flat, Woodleigh, Woolpunda, Wunkar and Yinkanie, and parts of Galga, Mantung, Mercunda, Murbko and Westons Flat.

== Councillors ==
As of 2014, the following councillors were elected:

Ward	Councillor
Mayor	Leon Stasinowsky
Deputy Mayor	Trevor Norton
Unsubdivided	Jody Flavel
Unsubdivided	Sonya Altschwager
Unsubdivided	Jordann Kleemann
Unsubdivided	Clive Matthews
Unsubdivided	Debbie Thiele
Unsubdivided	Michael Vowles
Unsubdivided	Peter Walker
Unsubdivided	Kym Webber
Unsubdivided	Terry Wheeldon

The mayor is directly elected.
