= Golden Heights, Florida =

- neighborhood
- Interactive map of Golden Heights, Florida
- Coordinates: 26°8′47″N 80°10′39″W
- Country: United States
- State: Florida
- County: Broward

Area
  - Total: 0.039 sq mi (0.1 km^{2})
  - Land: 0.039 sq mi (0.1 km^{2})
  - Water: 0 sq mi (0.0 km^{2})

Population (2000)
  - Total: 501
  - Density: 9,832/sq mi (3,796.3/km^{2})
- Time zone: UTC-5 (Eastern (EST))
  - Summer (DST): UTC-4 (EDT)
- FIPS code: 12-26425

Golden Heights was a census-designated place (CDP) in Broward County, Florida, United States. It is now a neighborhood in the City of Fort Lauderdale. The population was 501 at the 2000 census.

== Geography ==
Golden Heights is located at 26°8′47″N 80°10′39″W (26.146363, -80.177617).

According to the United States Census Bureau, the CDP has a total area of 0.1 km^{2} (0.039 sq mi), all land.

== Demographics ==
Golden Heights CDP, Florida – Racial and ethnic composition Note: the US Census treats Hispanic/Latino as an ethnic category. This table excludes Latinos from the racial categories and assigns them to a separate category. Hispanics/Latinos may be of any race.
Race / Ethnicity (NH = Non-Hispanic)	Pop 2000	2000
White alone (NH)	7	1.40%
Black or African American alone (NH)	469	93.61%
Native American or Alaska Native alone (NH)	0	0.00%
Asian alone (NH)	6	1.20%
Native Hawaiian or Pacific Islander alone (NH)	0	0.00%
Other race alone (NH)	0	0.00%
Mixed race or Multiracial (NH)	17	3.39%
Hispanic or Latino (any race)	2	0.40%
Total	501	100.00%

As of the census of 2000, there were 501 people, 176 households, and 121 families residing in the CDP. The population density was 3,868.7 people/km^{2} (10,020 people/mi^{2}). There were 185 housing units at an average density of 1,428.6 units/km^{2} (3,700 units/mi^{2}). The racial makeup of the CDP was 1.40% White, 94.01% African American, 1.20% Asian, and 3.39% from two or more races. Hispanic or Latino of any race were 0.40% of the population.

There were 176 households, out of which 19.3% had children under the age of 18 living with them, 30.7% were married couples living together, 29.5% had a female householder with no husband present, and 30.7% were non-families. 24.4% of all households were made up of individuals, and 14.2% had someone living alone who was 65 years of age or older. The average household size was 2.85 and the average family size was 3.37.

In the CDP, the population was spread out, with 25.3% under the age of 18, 6.0% from 18 to 24, 25.5% from 25 to 44, 20.0% from 45 to 64, and 23.2% who were 65 years of age or older. The median age was 40 years. For every 100 females, there were 89.1 males. For every 100 females age 18 and over, there were 78.9 males.

The median income for a household in the CDP was $41,641, and the median income for a family was $34,250. Males had a median income of $28,824 versus $31,111 for females. The per capita income for the CDP was $15,443. About 10.9% of families and 11.6% of the population were below the poverty line, including 21.6% of those under age 18 and 8.1% of those age 65 or over.

As of 2000, 100% of the population spoke English as a first language.
