= Riverland Solar Storage =

- Country: Australia
- Location: northeast of Morgan, South Australia
- Coordinates: 34.0°S 139.8°E
- Status: Cancelled
- Decommission date: January 2020
- Construction cost: A$700 million

Solar farm
- Type: Flat-panel PV
- Collectors: 3.4 million
- Site area: 600 hectares (1,500 acres)

Power generation
- Nameplate capacity: 330 MW
- Storage capacity: 400MWh

External links
- Website: https://www.lyoninfrastructure.com.au/projects/riverland-battery-power-plant/

Riverland Solar Storage was a proposed photo-voltaic solar power station planned to be built near Morgan in South Australia.

The project was announced in March 2017 by Lyon Group at a press conference which included Jay Weatherill, the premier of South Australia. Construction was expected to start within months and would employ 270 people during construction. It was proposed to generate up to 330MW of electricity from 3.4 million solar panels. It was also announced that it would have 1.1 million batteries providing 100 MW / 400MWh of electricity storage. It received development approval on 29 November 2017. The developer said it expected it to begin operations in late 2018. However only a month later, another press release announced that the project was on track to commence construction in early 2019.

A delay arose in late 2017 when the intended supplier of solar modules, First Solar sued Lyon Group for an unpaid loan. At the time, Lyon was attempting to sell several of its development projects, including Riverland Solar Storage. Lyon continued to prepare development of Riverland and two sister projects, and announced partners JERA (a joint venture of Tokyo Electric Power Company and Chubu Electric Power) and Fluence (a joint venture of Siemens and AES Corporation) for the battery storage in May 2018. Administrators were appointed to three companies in the Lyon Group in May 2019. In October 2019, Lyon announced that it had reached an arrangement with China Huadian Corporation to partner in developing projects in Australia and Asia.

Eventually, the developer companies were liquidated and the liquidators referred the directors to the Australian Securities & Investments Commission for further investigation.
