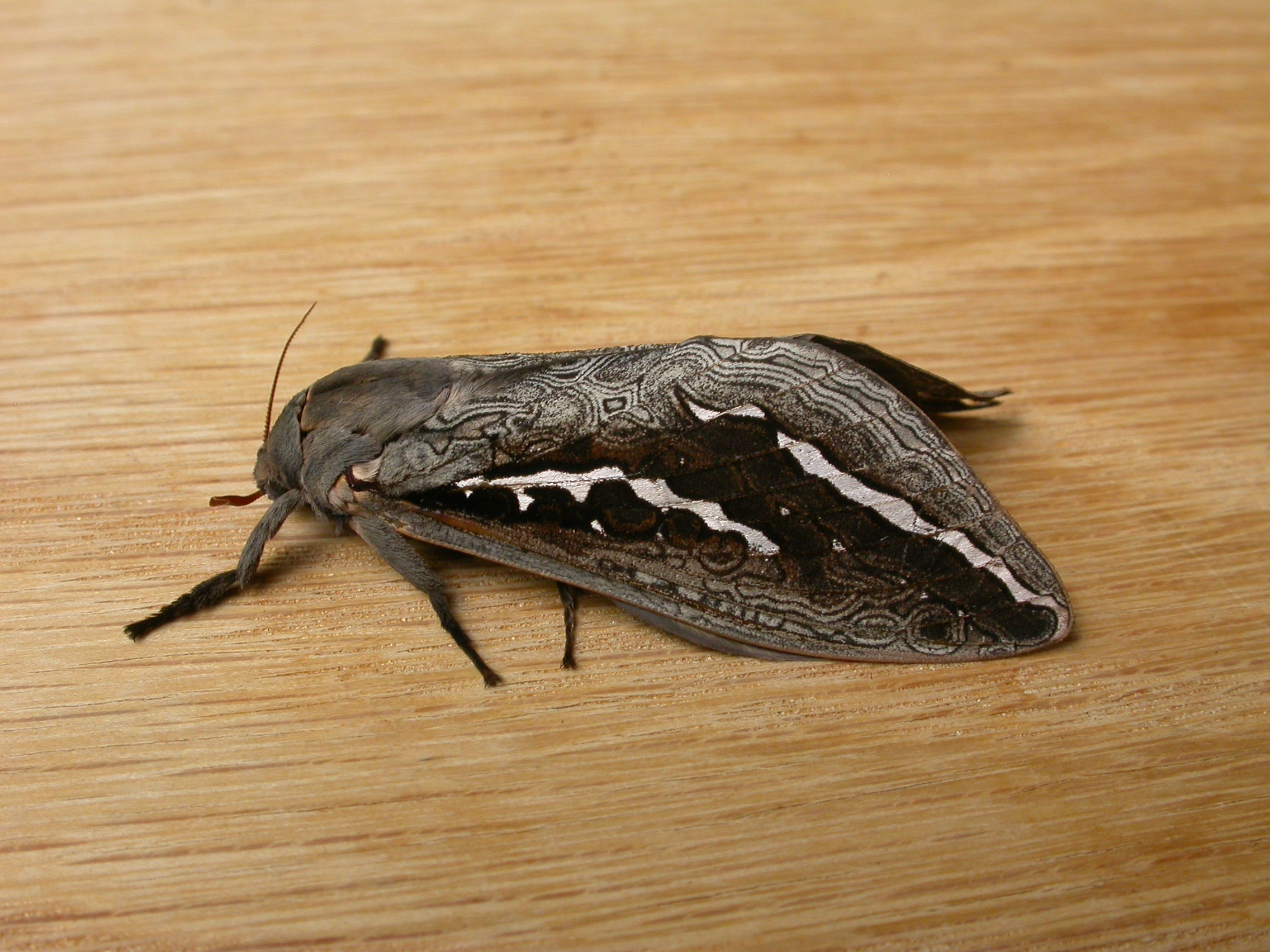

Scientific classification
- Kingdom: Animalia
- Phylum: Arthropoda
- Clade: Pancrustacea
- Class: Insecta
- Order: Lepidoptera
- Family: Hepialidae
- Genus: Abantiades
- Species: A. atripalpis

Binomial name
- Abantiades atripalpis (Walker, 1856)

Synonyms
- Pielus atripalpis Walker, 1856; Trictena argentata; Trictena atripalpis

= Abantiades atripalpis =

Species of moth

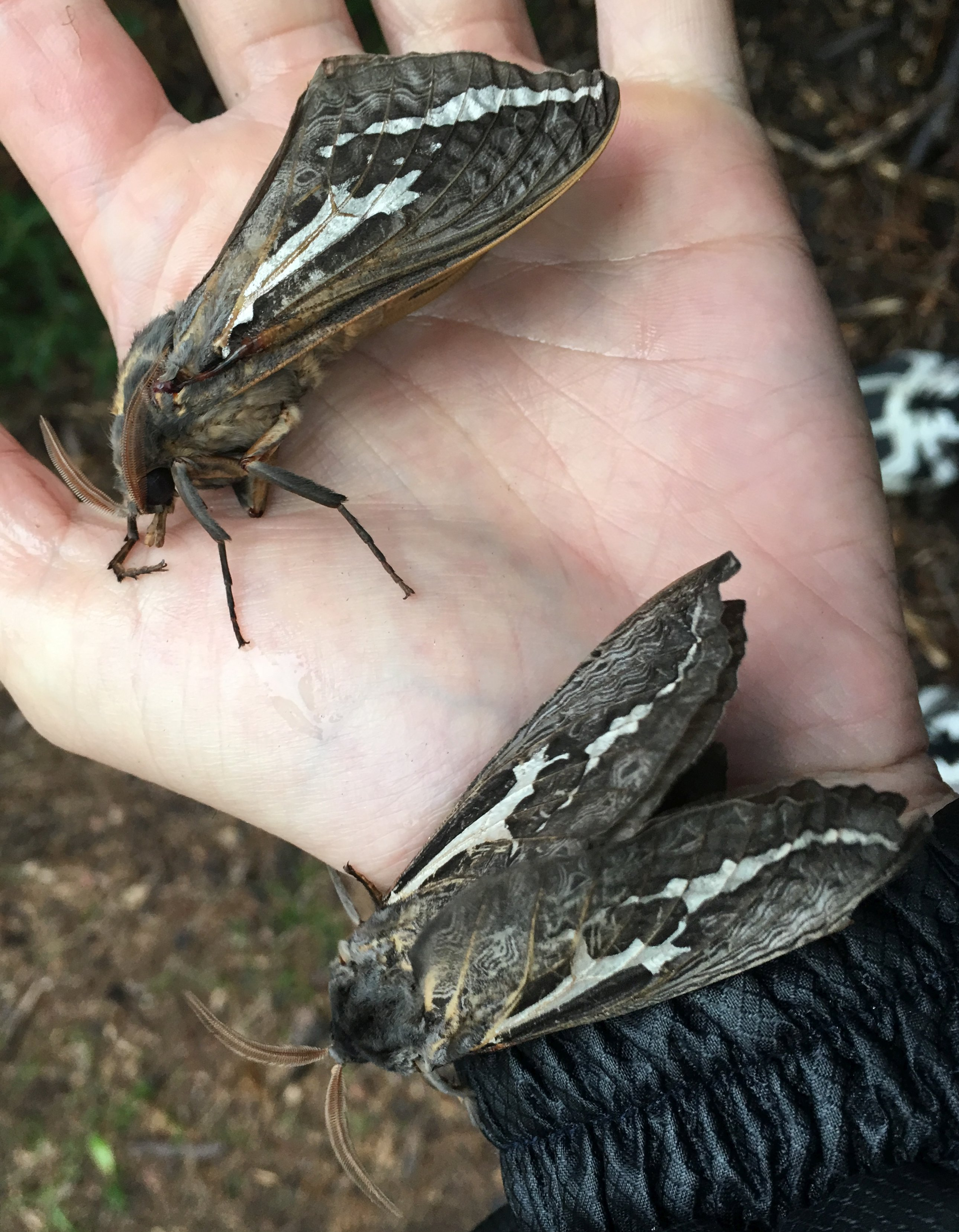
On a man's hand

Abantiades atripalpis, previously known as Trictena atripalpis, also known as rain moth, waikerie, and bardi (and variant spellings), is a moth of the family Hepialidae. It is one of the largest moths in Australia, and is found in the whole southern half of the country. The moths provide a food source for nocturnal animals, and the larval stage grubs are used as bait in fishing.

== Naming ==
The moth's common name, "rain moth", stems from the fact that the adult moths often emerge from their pupae before rain, during the southern hemisphere autumn, in March or April. The Aboriginal name for the moth is waikerie, and other common names are swift month, and "bardee" of "bardi" grub, although this name is used by fishers for other species of grubs as well.

Its scientific name is Abantiades atripalpis, after having been previously known as Trictena atripalpis.

== Description ==
=== Larvae ===
The larvae live in tunnels, burrowing deep after hatching. They feed on the roots of various Acacia and Eucalyptus species, especially the roots of Eucalyptus camaldulensis (red gums), as well as Casuarina pauper. They are herbivores. Their burrows widen as they grow bigger, reaching a diameter of up to several centimetres.

=== Moth ===
The pupae emerge from their tunnels as they turn into moths, leaving the pupal case sticking up out of the ground.

The wingspan is up to 120 millimetres (4.7 in) for males and 170 millimetres (6.7 in) for females. They can be the same size as a small insectivorous bat, and owls often prey on them. The body reaches a length of 120 mm (4.7 in), making it one of Australia's largest moths. The wings are grey-brown, frequently bearing two silver markings across each forewing.

== Life cycle ==
The moths only live for one day, and are unable to feed. Their sole purpose is to breed. The adult females produce a great number (up to 40,000) of eggs, which are scattered while flying, aimed towards the roots of gum trees.

Their flight months are in the southern hemisphere's autumn season (March to June).

== Habitat ==
The rain moth is found right across southern Australia, including Tasmania, in woodland areas alongside creeks and gullies, especially near eucalyptus trees.

== Environmental impact and uses ==
They play an environmental role by aerating the soil as caterpillars, and as adults, they are a eaten by bats, owls, and tawny frogmouths.

Some Aboriginal peoples, notably the Nyoongar of Western Australia, included the grubs in their diet.

The caterpillar is used by fishers as bait.

== In the arts ==
In August 2026, a public artwork named Rain, inspired by the rain moth, was unveiled on Osmond Terrace in Norwood, South Australia. The sculpture was created by artists Laura Wills and Will Cheesman, in collaboration with many others, including Kaurna consultants, including artist Violet Buckskin; writers, including Jennifer Mills; filmmaker Tayla Stabile; entomologists; lighting designers; glass casting artists; and engineers. The work was commissioned by the local council, the City of Norwood Payneham & St Peters, through its Quadrennial Public Art Program.
