= Golden Heights, South Australia =

Golden Heights South Australia
- Coordinates: 34.20°S 139.94°E
- Population: 269 (SAL 2016)
- Established: 1963
- Postcode(s): 5322
- Location: 6 km (4 mi) west of Waikerie
- State electorate(s): Chaffey
- Federal division(s): Barker
Localities around Golden Heights:
	Ramco
Ramco Heights	Golden Heights	Waikerie
Stockyard Plain

Golden Heights is a locality in the Riverland region of South Australia west of Waikerie. It is predominantly irrigated vineyards and orchards on higher ground, overlooking the Murray River to the north, and bounded by the Sturt Highway on the south.
