= Maggea =

Maggea South Australia
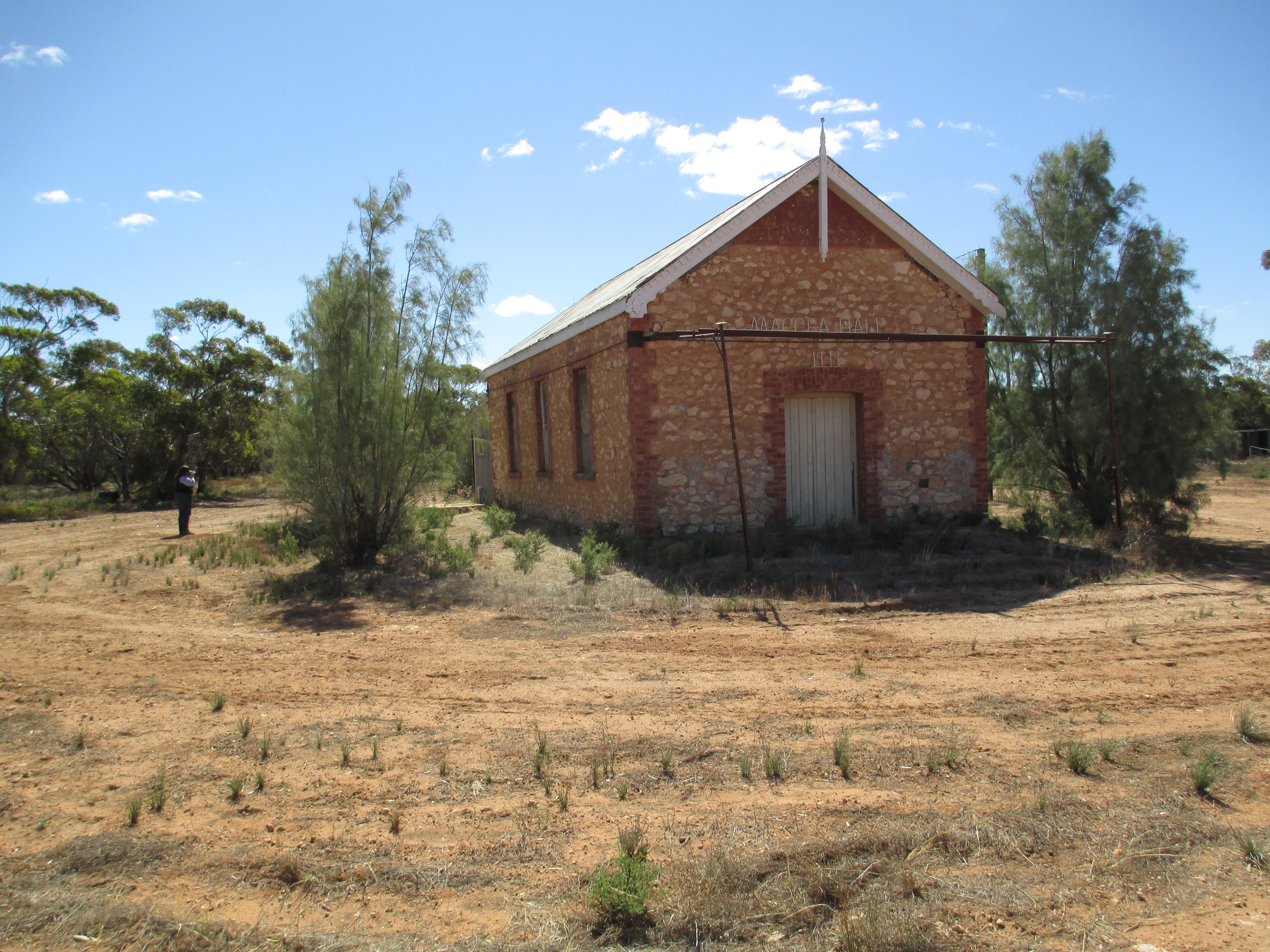
- Maggea hall building showing 1919 date of first use

- Coordinates: 34°28′37″S 140°03′53″E
- Population: 15 (SAL 2021)
- Established: 4 November 1915 (town); 27 March 2003 (locality)
- Postcode(s): 5311
- Elevation: 63 m (207 ft)(Railway Station)
- Time zone: ACST (UTC+9:30)
  - Summer (DST): ACDT (UTC+10:30)
- Location: 45 km (28 mi) E of Swan Reach
- LGA(s): District Council of Loxton Waikerie
- Region: Murray and Mallee
- County: Albert
- State electorate(s): Chaffey
- Federal division(s): Barker
Localities around Maggea:
| New Well | New Well; Boolgun | Wunkar |
| New Well; Naidia; Bakara Well | Maggea | Wunkar; Mantung |
| Bakara Well | Bakara Well; Galga; Mercunda; Mantung | Mantung |
- Footnotes: Adjoining localities

Maggea is a town and locality in the Murray Mallee region of South Australia. It is on the Stott Highway between Swan Reach and Loxton and was on the former Waikerie railway line. The town is almost deserted now that the railway line has closed.

Maggea was named in 1915 after the local Aboriginal Australian name for camp. The school operated in the hall from 1919 to 1967.

The 2016 Australian census which was conducted in August 2016 reports that Maggea had a population of 12 people.

Maggea is located within the federal division of Barker, the state electoral district of Chaffey and the local government area of the District Council of Loxton Waikerie.
