= Pooginook, South Australia =

Pooginook South Australia
- Coordinates: 34°04′07″S 140°06′06″E
- Population: 8 (SAL 2021)
- Established: 28 September 2000
- Postcode(s): 5330
- Time zone: ACST (UTC+9:30)
  - Summer (DST): ACST (UTC+10:30)
- Location: 167 km (104 mi) NE of Adelaide; 60 km (37 mi) NW of Loxton
- LGA(s): District Council of Loxton Waikerie
- Region: Murray and Mallee
- County: Young
- State electorate(s): Chaffey
- Federal division(s): Barker
Mean max temp	Mean min temp	Annual rainfall
25.3 °C; 78 °F	9.3 °C; 49 °F	281.5 mm 11.1 in
Suburbs around Pooginook:
Markaranka	Taylorville Station	Taylorville Station
Markaranka; Lowbank	Pooginook	Devlins Pound
Lowbank	Lowbank; Good Hope Landing	Good Hope Landing
- Footnotes: Locations; Adjoining localities

Pooginook is a locality in the Australian state of South Australia located in the state’s east about 167 kilometres (104 mi) north-east of the state capital of Adelaide and about 60 kilometres (37 mi) north-west of the municipal seat in Loxton.

Pooginook’s boundaries were created on 28 September 2000 for the “local established name” which is derived from the cadastral unit of the Hundred of Pooginook in which it occupies the south-western corner. The locality is bounded to the south by the middle of the River Murray channel. The boundary with the locality of Taylorville Station to the north was revised in 2013 to “ensure the whole of the Taylorville Pastoral Run is located within the locality of the same name.”

Land use within Pooginook is zoned into three categories. Land adjoining the River Murray is zoned as River Murray Flood where development is controlled in response to flooding events and to conserve “natural features” and maintain water quality. Land occupied by the Pooginook Conservation Park in the locality’s north is zoned for conservation. The remainder of the locality is zoned as primary production with the principal focus being on agricultural production.

The 2016 Australian census which was conducted in August 2016 reports that Pooginook had a population of seven people.

Pooginook is located within the federal division of Barker, the state electoral district of Chaffey and the local government area of the District Council of Loxton Waikerie.
