= Ramco, South Australia =

Ramco South Australia
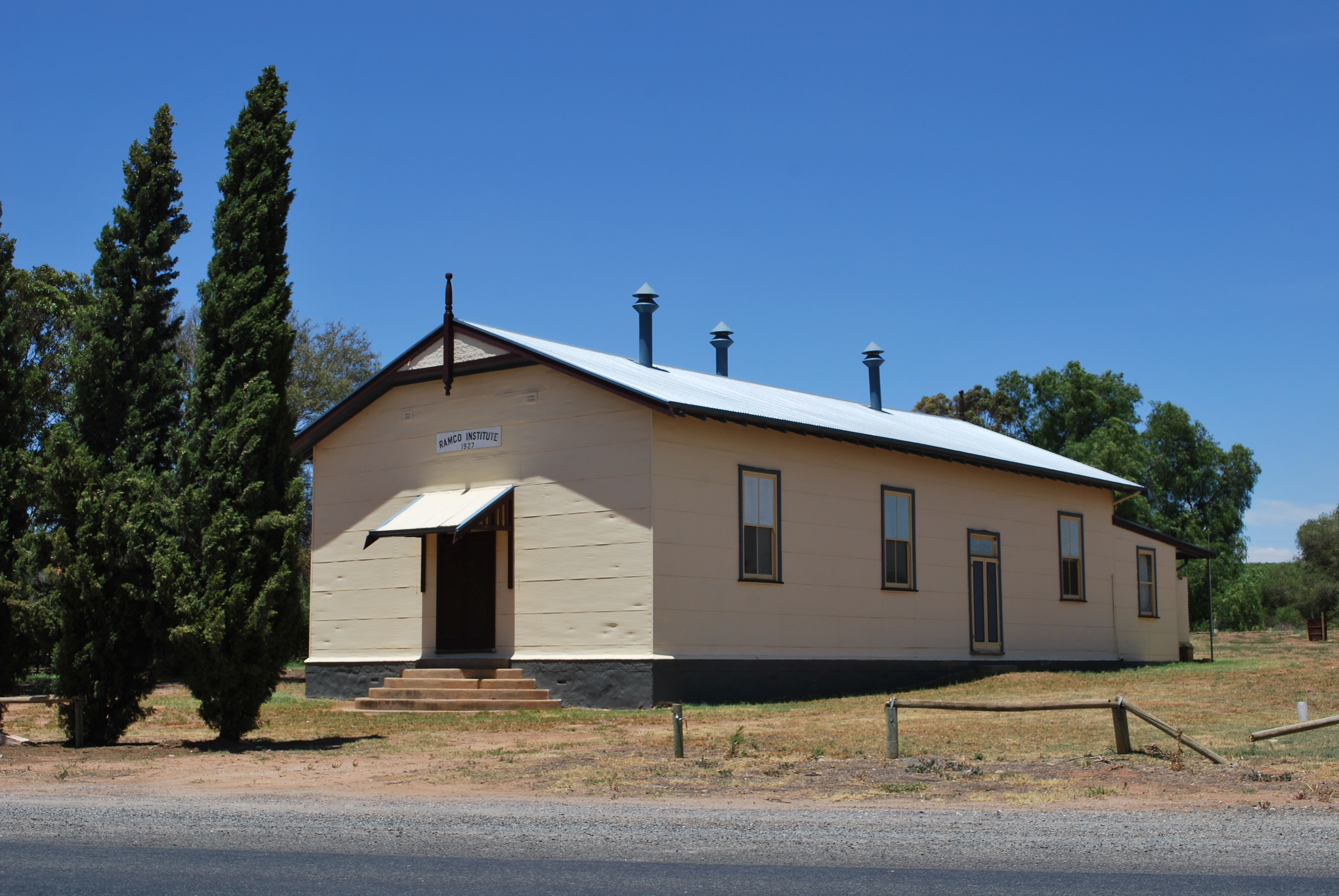
- Institute, built in 1927

- Coordinates: 34.171594°S 139.94458°E
- Population: 135 (SAL 2021)
- Postcode(s): 5322
- Location: 170 km (106 mi) NE of Adelaide; 86 km (53 mi) SW of Renmark; 7 km (4 mi) W of Waikerie
- LGA(s): District Council of Loxton Waikerie
- County: Albert
- State electorate(s): Chaffey
- Federal division(s): Barker
Localities around Ramco:
Sunlands	Taylorville
	Ramco	Waikerie
Ramco Heights	Golden Heights

Ramco is a town in the Riverland region of South Australia 170 kilometres (110 mi) north-east of the state capital, Adelaide and 7 kilometres (4.3 mi) west of Waikerie. It is on the southern bank of the Murray River downstream from Waikerie.

Ramco has a post office, a Lutheran church, a town hall and a school, Ramco Primary School. The current town was surveyed in 1940 however there was an earlier village settlement by the same name in the same area, settled in 1894.

The name Ramco is derived from an Aboriginal word "Bogorampko", a mythical tribe supposed to be superior to all natives. The locality includes the Ramco Lagoon adjacent to the river, but the adjoining Ramco Point Conservation Park is in the adjacent locality of Sunlands.

Ramco is located within the federal division of Barker, the state electoral district of Chaffey and the local government area of the District Council of Loxton Waikerie.

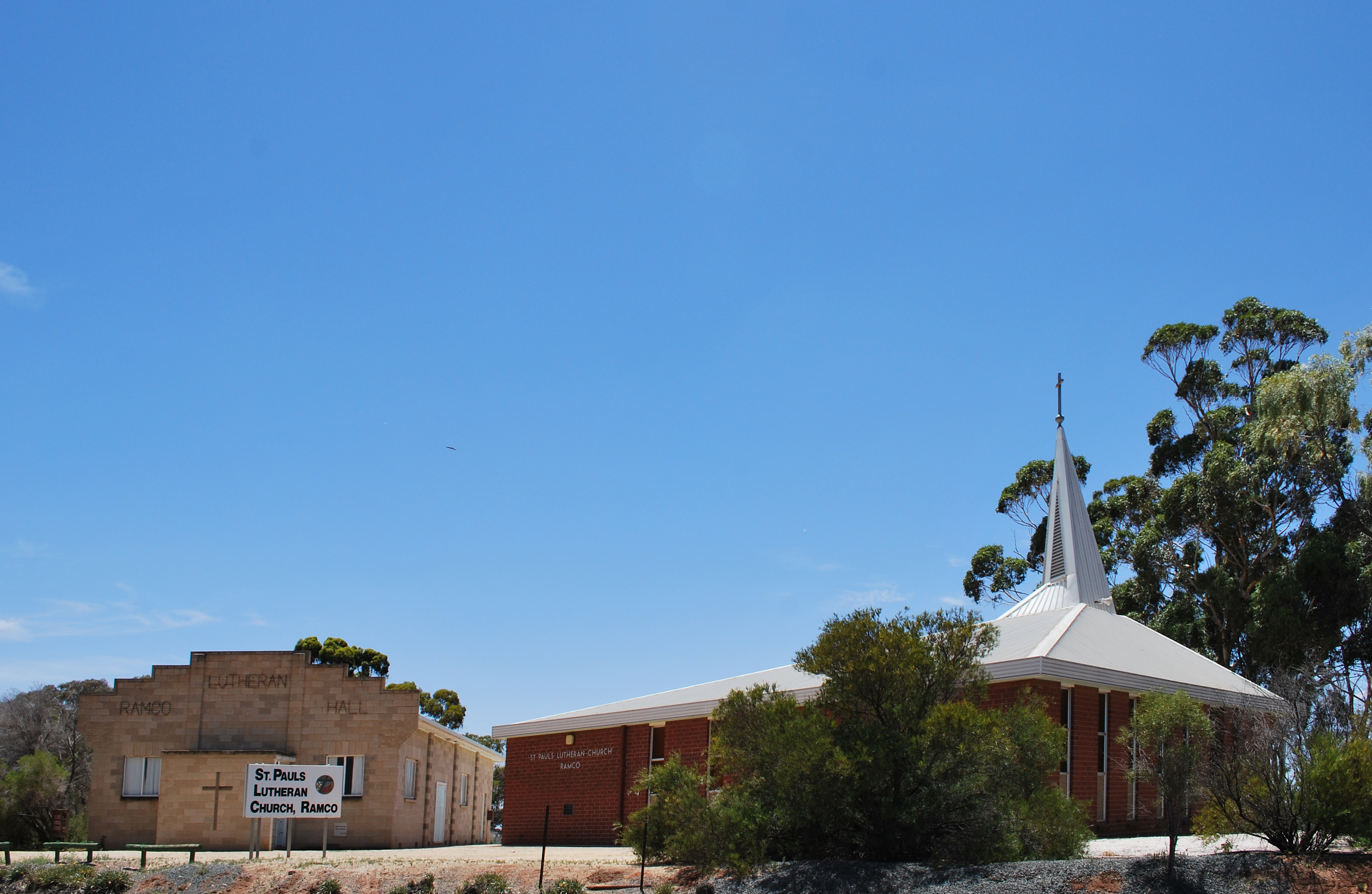
Lutheran Church & Hall
