= Waikerie, South Australia =

Waikerie
- Town
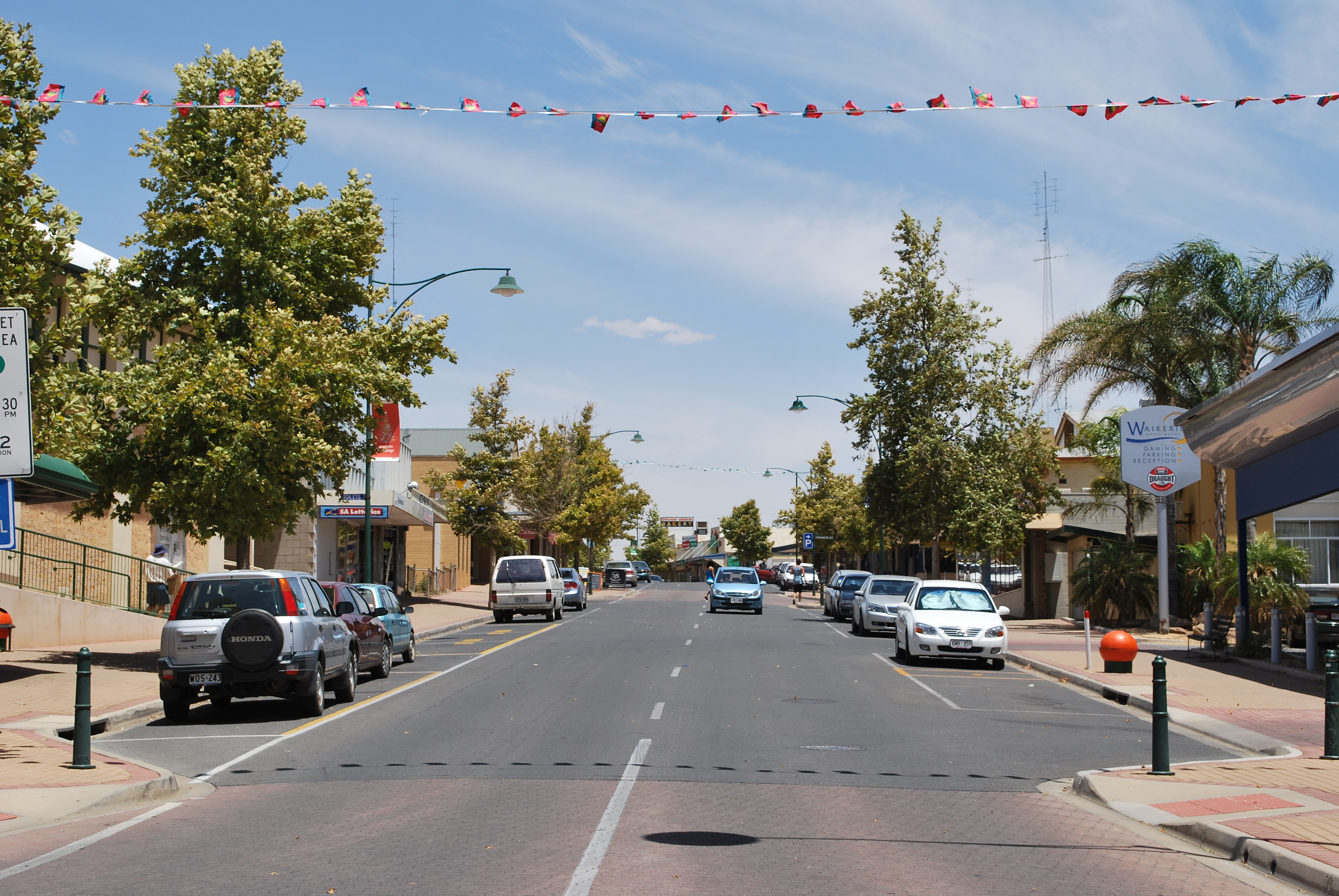
- McCoy street, the main street of Waikerie

- Coordinates: 34°10′0″S 139°59′0″E
- Country: Australia
- State: South Australia
- LGA: District Council of Loxton Waikerie
- Location: 173 km (107 mi) NE of Adelaide; 79 km (49 mi) W of Renmark

Government
  - State electorate: Chaffey
  - Federal division: Barker

Population
  - Total: 1,670 (UCL 2021)
- Postcode: 5330

Waikerie (/ˈweɪkəri/ WAY-kə-ree ) is a rural town in the Riverland region of South Australia on the south bank of the Murray River. At the 2021 census, Waikerie had a population of 1,670. The Sturt Highway passes to the south of the town at the top of the cliffs. There is a cable ferry crossing the river to provide vehicle access from the north side of the river. Waikerie is known for citrus growing, along with stone fruit and grapes.

In 2026, Waikerie was named South Australia's Agricultural Town of the Year, a Primary Industries and Regions SA (PIRSA) award. It was the town's first win, after it had been a finalist in 2022 and 2023. Following nominations of over 90 towns, Waikerie impressed judges with its strong vision for the future and willingness to continue to grow and evolve, including looking beyond its own borders for ideas and opportunities.

== History ==
The Ngawait people have inhabited the area for millennia. The river and surrounding land provided everything they needed - fish, shellfish, birds, kangaroos, and native fruits.

Settlers established Waikerie Station on the land, its name derived from the Aboriginal name for the rain moths (Trictena argentata) that emerge from the ground among the river red gums (Eucalyptus camaldulensis) after autumn rains. The town derived its name from the station.

The town began with the Village Settlement scheme implemented by the South Australian colonial government in response to the 1892 bank crash and consequent depression. As part of the Crown Lands Amendment Bill of 1894, associations of 20 or more persons were invited to select a Village Settlement Perpetual Lease of at least 160 acres of Crown Land for irrigation farming. In 1894 eleven settlements were established on the River Murray, in chronological order: Lyrup, Waikerie (spelled "Wakeri"), Holder, Pyap, Kingston, Gillen, New Era, Moorook, Murtho, Ramco (an offshoot, founded by the unmarried men of Waikerie), and New Residence. Settlements failed due to over-enthusiasm and inexperience, poor choice of pumping equipment, and the rabbit pest. Gillen, New Residence and Murtho, with the worst soil, were the first to fail. By 1905 only Ramco, Waikerie, Kingston, and Lyrup remained. Waikerie and Ramco settlements, both heavily in debt, were subsumed by the government in the Waikerie Irrigation Area in 1910 and 1912 respectively, Kingston was subsumed by the Kingston Irrigation Area in 1914, and only Lyrup remained as a Village Settlement Perpetual Lease.

== Governance and demographics ==
Waikerie is in the District Council of Loxton Waikerie, the South Australian House of Assembly electoral district of Chaffey and the Australian House of Representatives Division of Barker.

At the 2021 census, Waikerie had a population of 1,670.

== Landmarks and attractions ==
The historic former Irrigation Pumping Station Chimney in Scenic Lookout Reserve is listed on the South Australian Heritage Register.

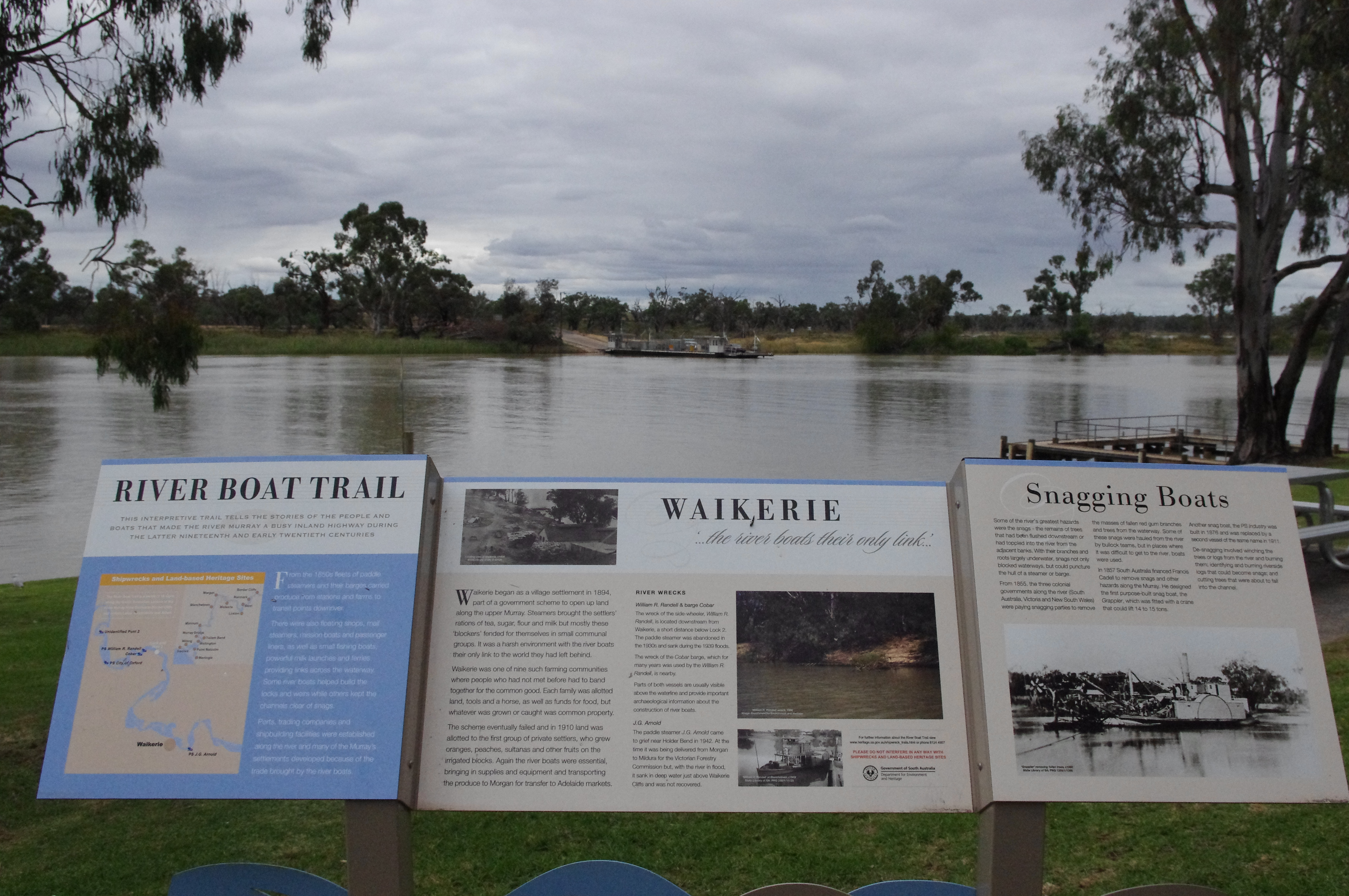
Information sign, overlooking where the ferry crosses the river

== Media ==
The main newspaper of the region is The River News, first published in July 1956 and founded as a direct result of the 1956 Murray River floods.

== Waikerie Airport ==
Waikerie Airport is near Waikerie. It is home to the Waikerie Gliding Club. It has two runways 08/26 and 02/20. The flat dry terrain provides good thermals for gliding. Waikerie hosted the 14th World Gliding Championships in 1974.

== Silo art ==
In March 2019, the Waikerie silo art project was completed. South Australian artist Garry Duncan painted one silo with a semi-abstract river landscape and characterised native river creatures such as pelicans, ducks, frogs, and rain moths. On the other silo, Jimmy Dvate from Melbourne painted a regent parrot, a yabby, and the endangered Murray hardyhead fish.

== Sport ==
Waikerie is home to the Waikerie Football Club, who currently play in the (Australian Rules) Riverland Football League. Former Adelaide Crows captain Mark Ricciuto is from Waikerie and played junior football with the club.

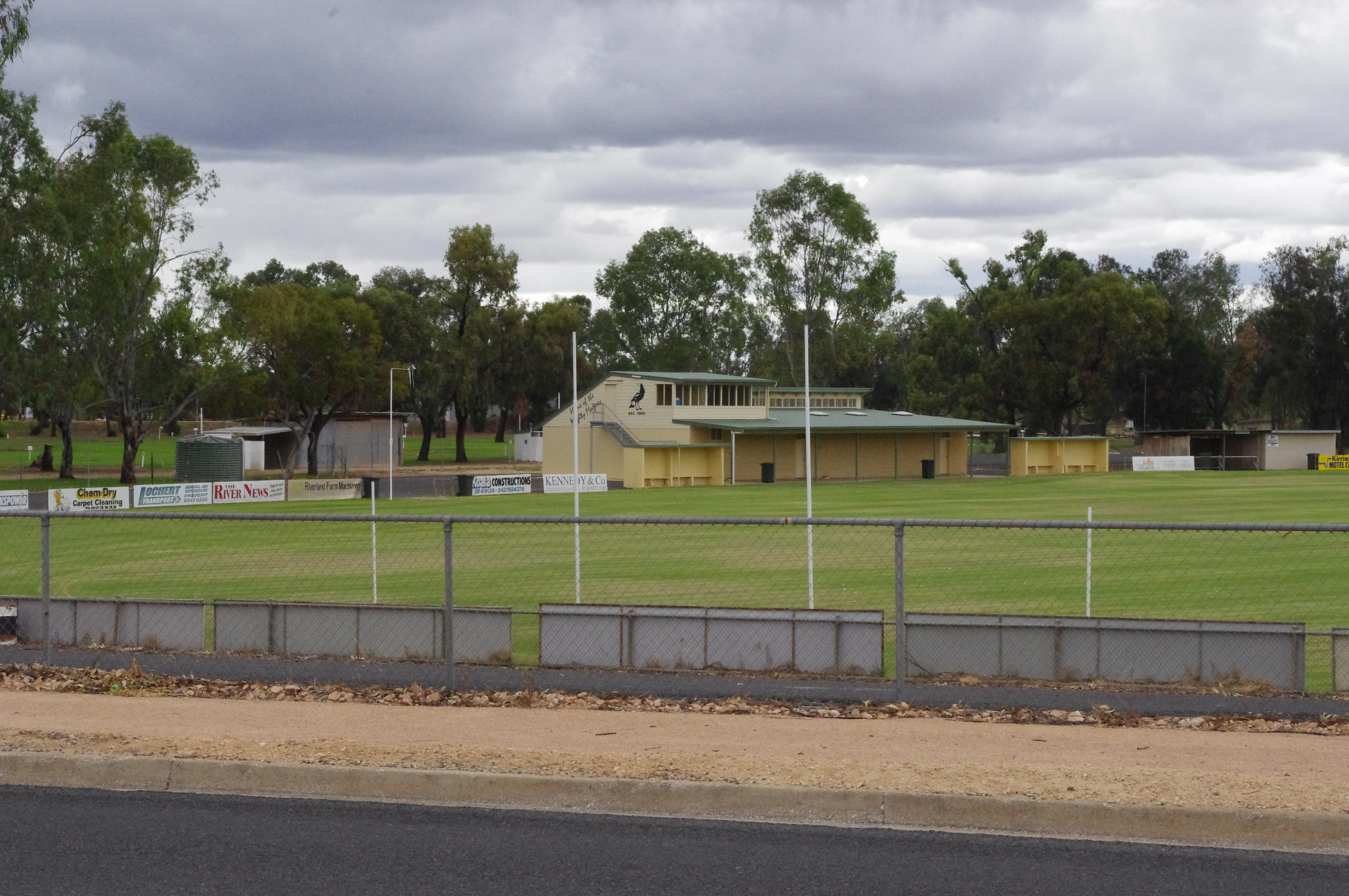
View of the football club oval from Peake Terrace

Waikerie is also home to the 360 metres (390 yd) Sunline Speedway. The speedway has been home to Super Sedan drivers Wally Francombe (supercharged EH Holden), Robert Gwynne (Chevrolet Camaro), Noel Reichstein (Chevrolet Corvette) and twice (and inaugural) Australian Street Stock Champion, Neil Hoffman and his Chrysler Centura. Other classes that race at the Speedway include Modified Sedans, Formula 500s, 360 Sprintcars, AMCA Nationals and Late Models.

== Notable people from Waikerie ==
Notable people born, educated, or at some point resident Waikerie include:

- Sir Don Anderson, CBE (1917–1975) – Director-General of Civil Aviation and later chairman of Qantas Airways Ltd.
- Neil Andrew, AO, FTSE (1944– ) – Speaker of the House of Representatives, Federal Parliament of Australia. Chair, Murray–Darling Basin Authority
- Meredith Arnold, AO – Awarded AO in 2013 for her involvement with the local historical society, the Waikerie District Community Committee and her volunteer work at the Waikerie High School and hospital
- Rick Darling (1957– ) – Cricketer, played for South Australia and Australia
- Anne Fulwood (1959– ) – Reporter, journalist and writer
- Ken I'Anson – Motor cycle racer – Australian Sidecar Champion, Australian Pairs Champion, SA Champion, multiple Australian Track Champion, Australian speedway champion
- Malcolm John Jinks (1945– ) – Many times Australian national champion and world championship glider pilot. 1967 and 1976 Riverland Sportsperson of the year
- John Percival Jennings, AO, ISM, RDA (1923–2003) – Senior horticultural adviser and fruit grower. John P Jennings Park in Waikerie named after him.
- John T. Jennings, BSc(Hons), PhD, FRSSA (1950–) – Entomologist, University of Adelaide. President of the Royal Society of South Australia (2008–2010). Editor Natural history of the Riverland and Murraylands, Occasional publications of the Royal Society of South Australia; no. 9 (2009).
- Kym Vincent Lehmann (1946–) – Australian Rules Football player, North Adelaide Football Club
- Bruce Malcolm Light (1949–2018) – Australian Rules Football player, Port Adelaide Football Club
- Geoffrey (Geoff) Haydon Manning (1926–2018) – Unionist, author and historian
- Mark Ricciuto (1975-) – Australian Rules Football player, West Adelaide and Adelaide Crows football clubs
- Chris Western (1974–) Off-road racer

== Gallery ==
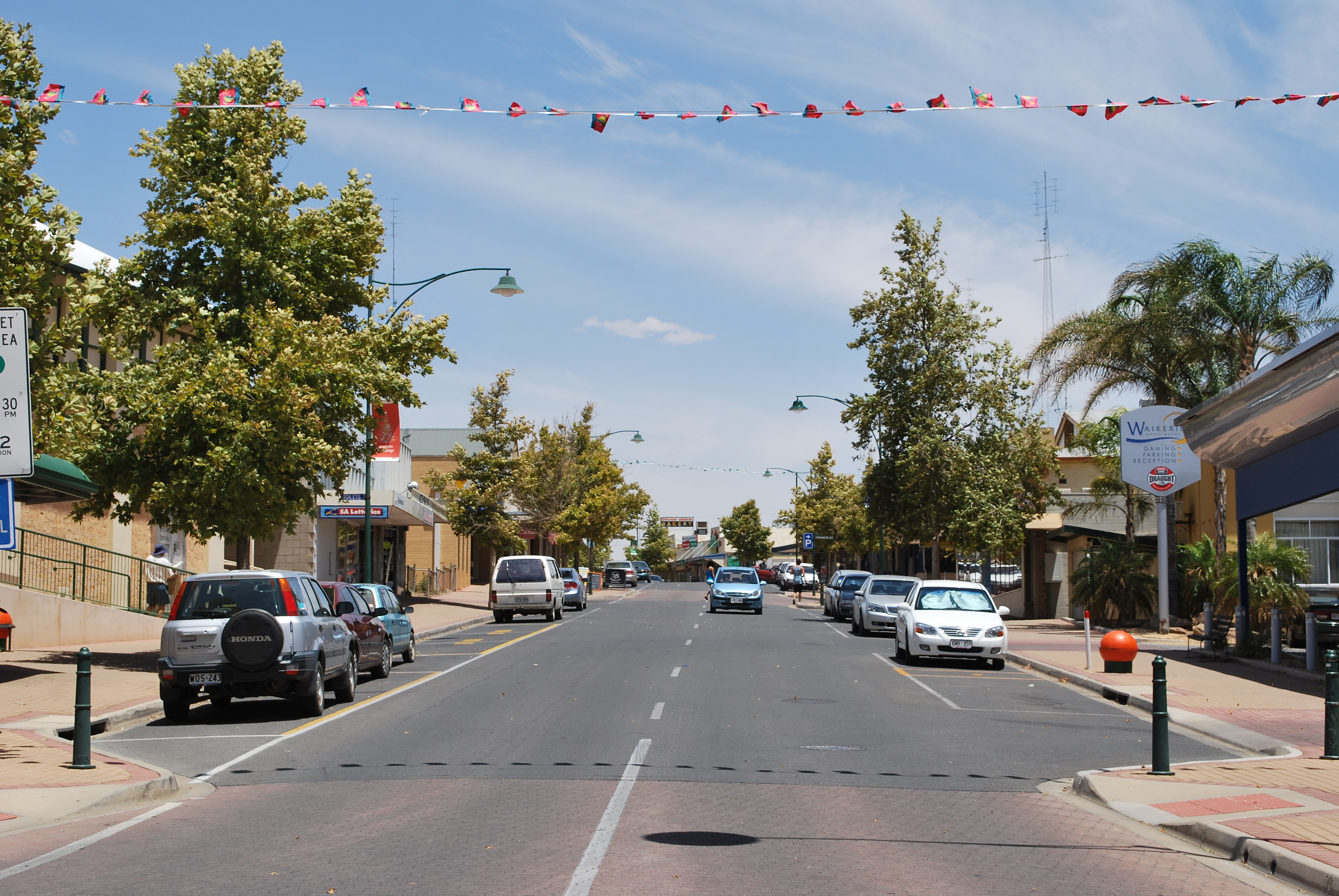
Main Street

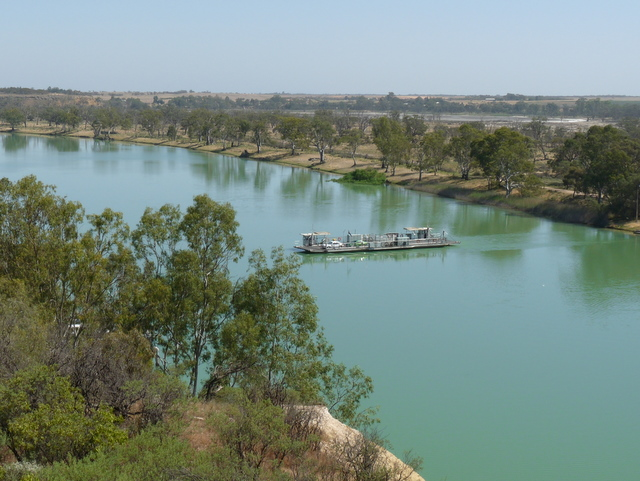
Waikerie, Riverland

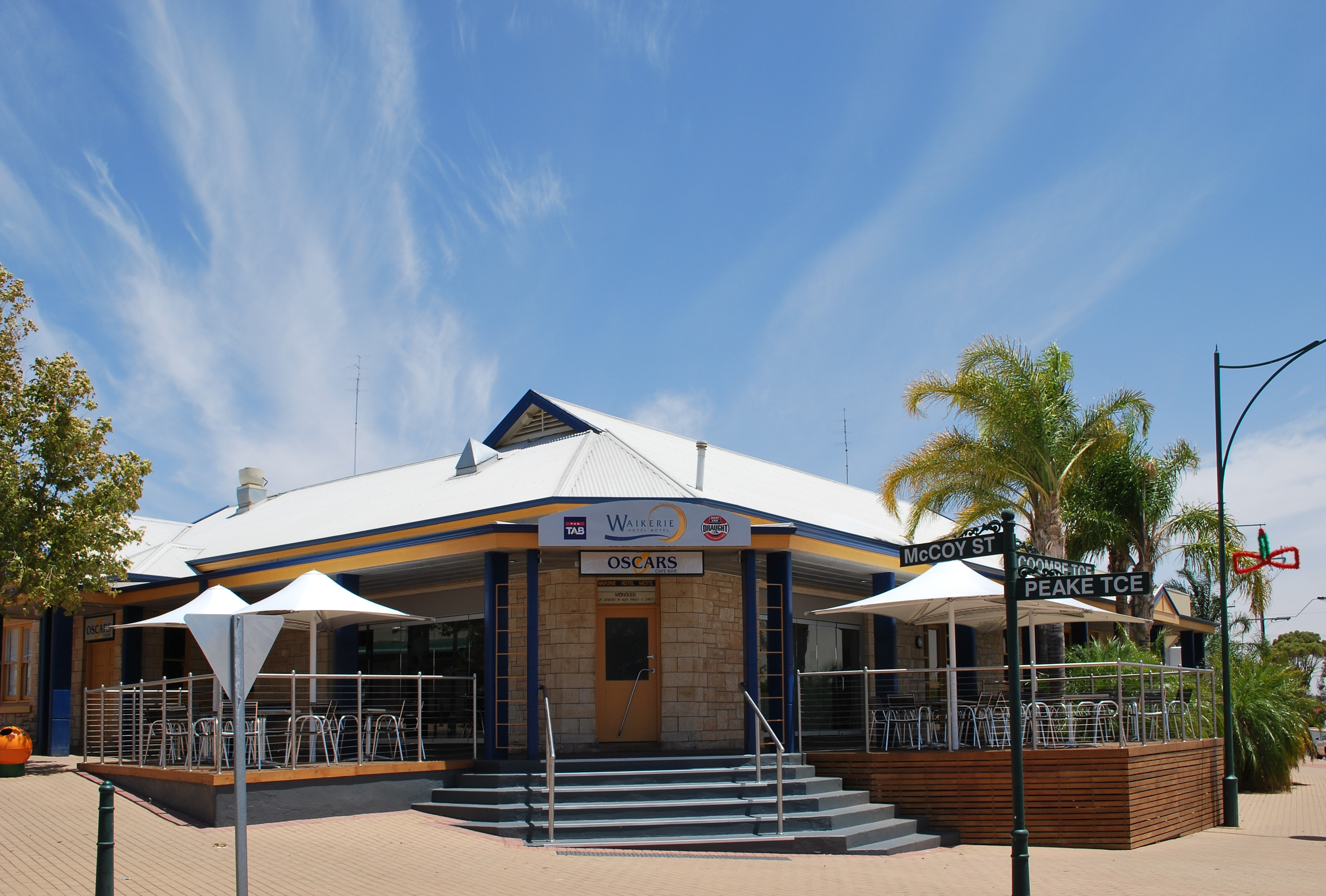
Waikerie Hotel

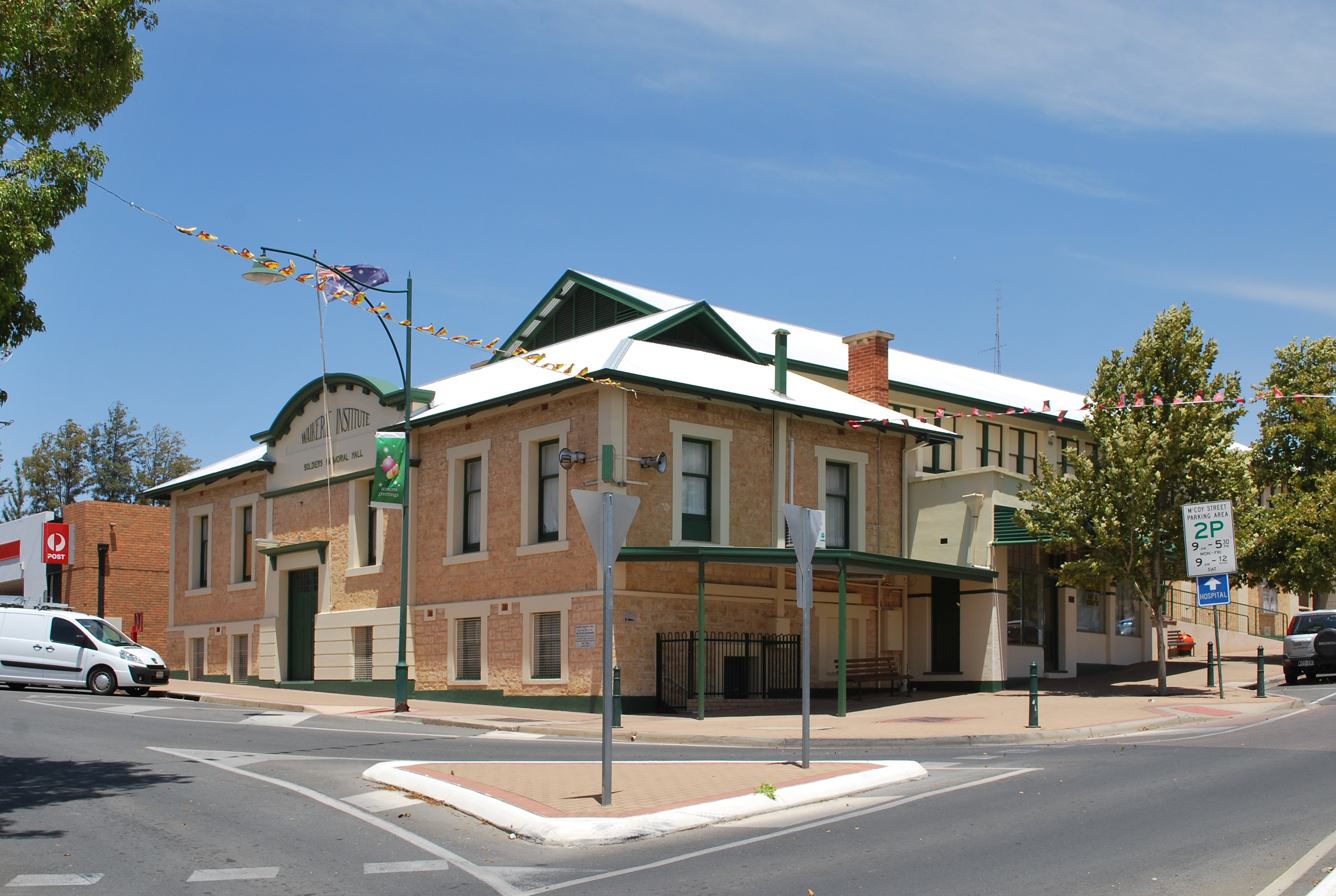
Waikerie Institute

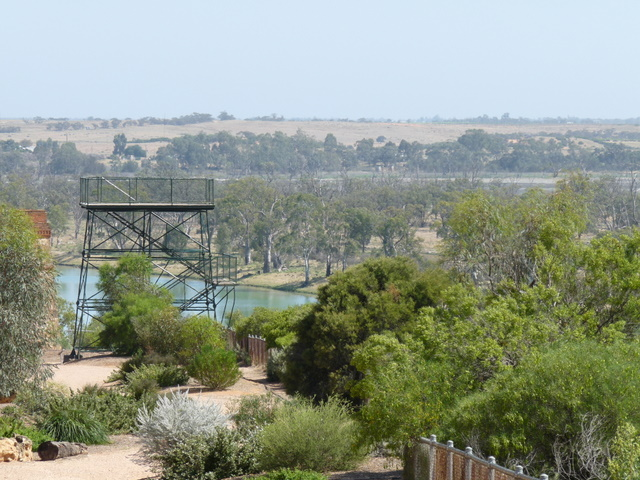
Waikerie, Riverland

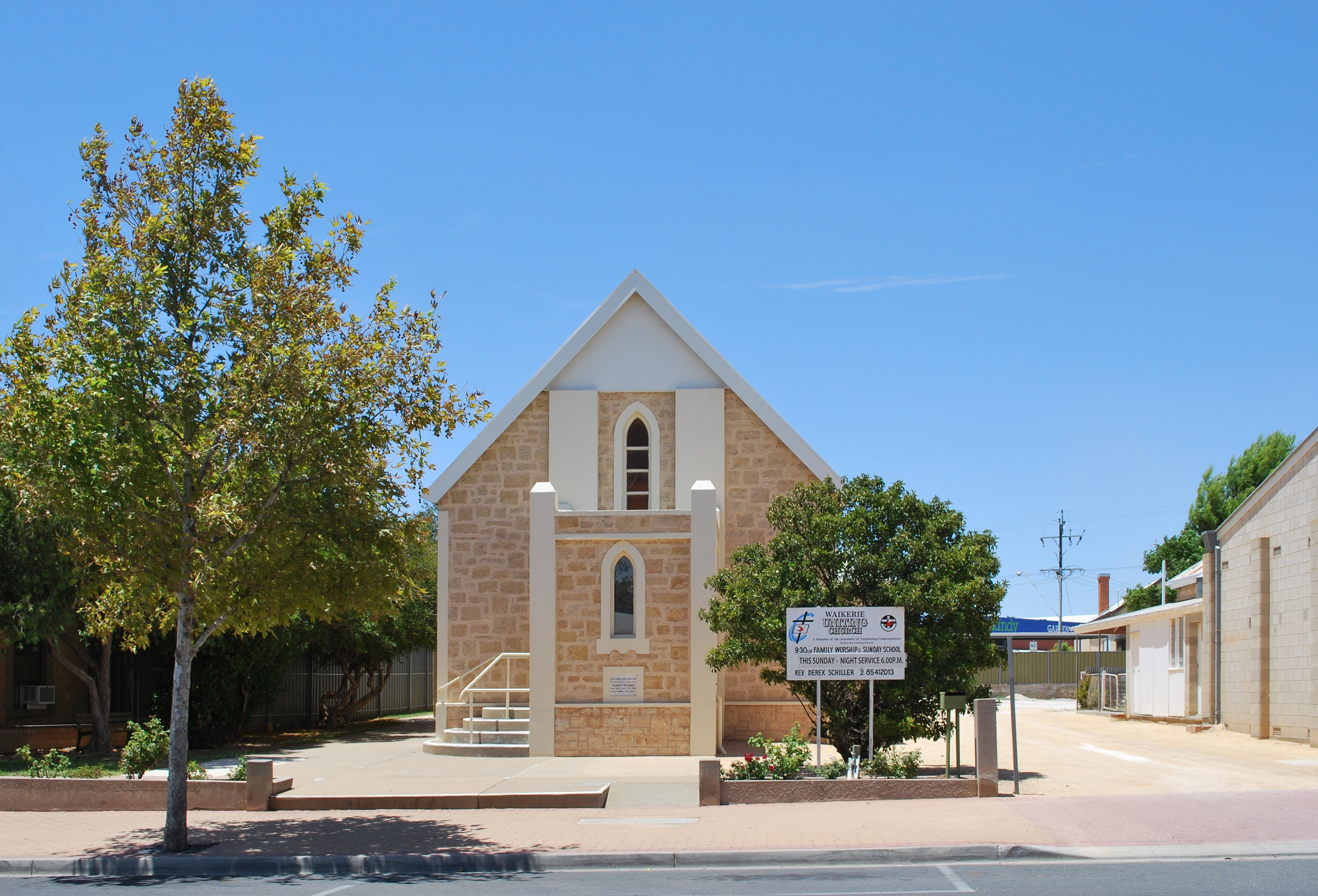
Uniting Church

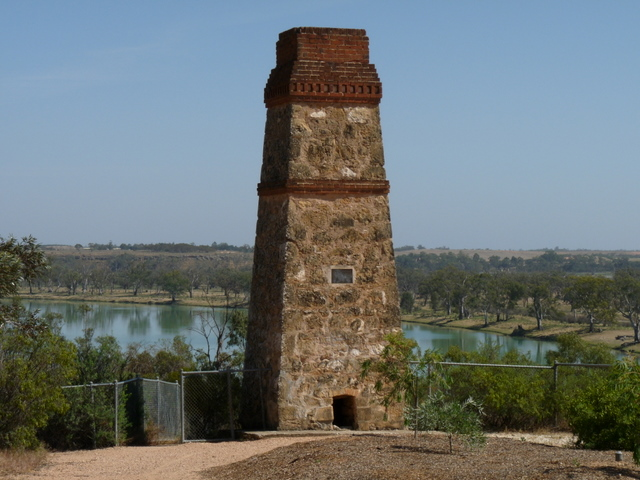
Waikerie, Riverland

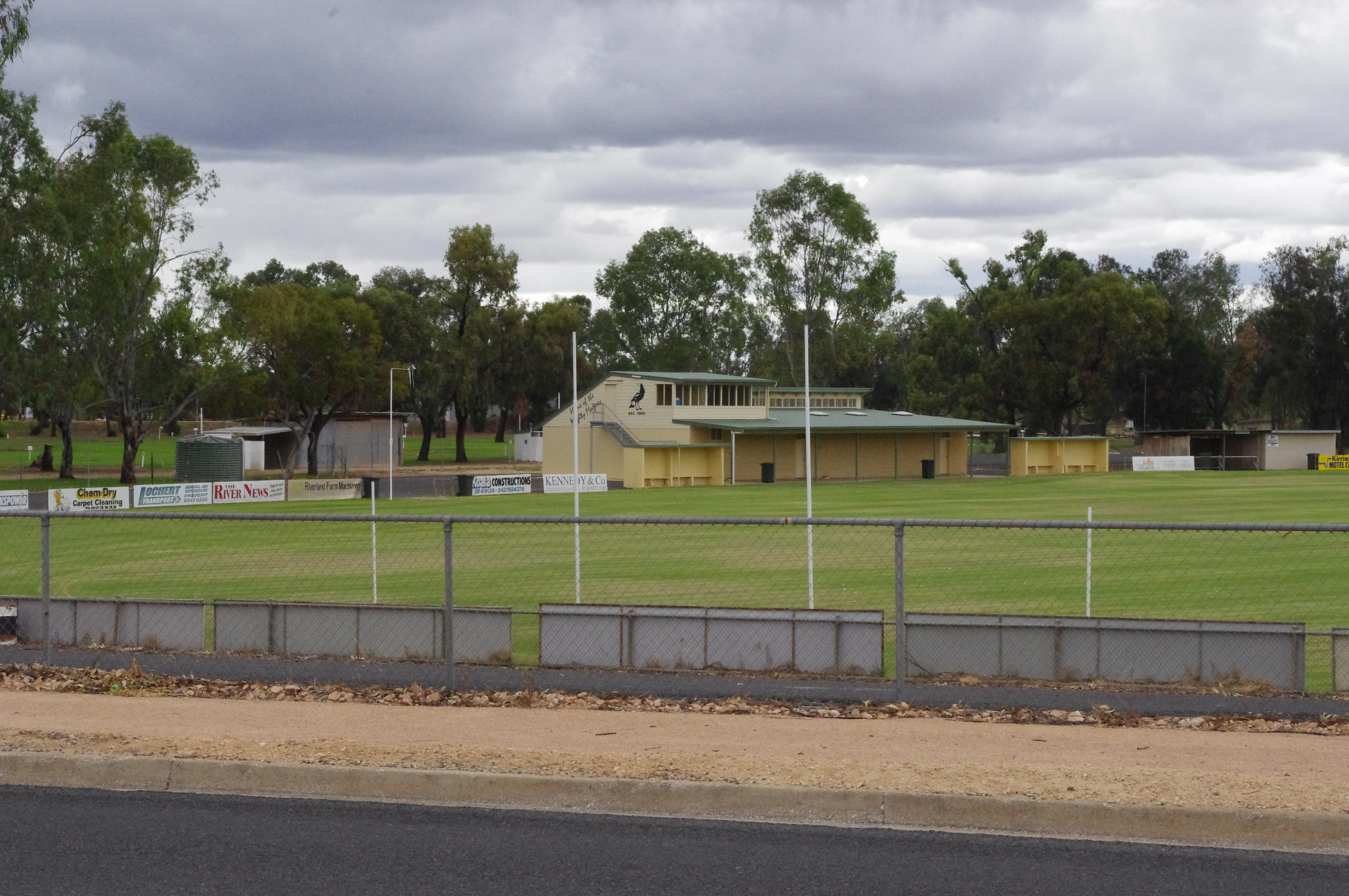
Oval

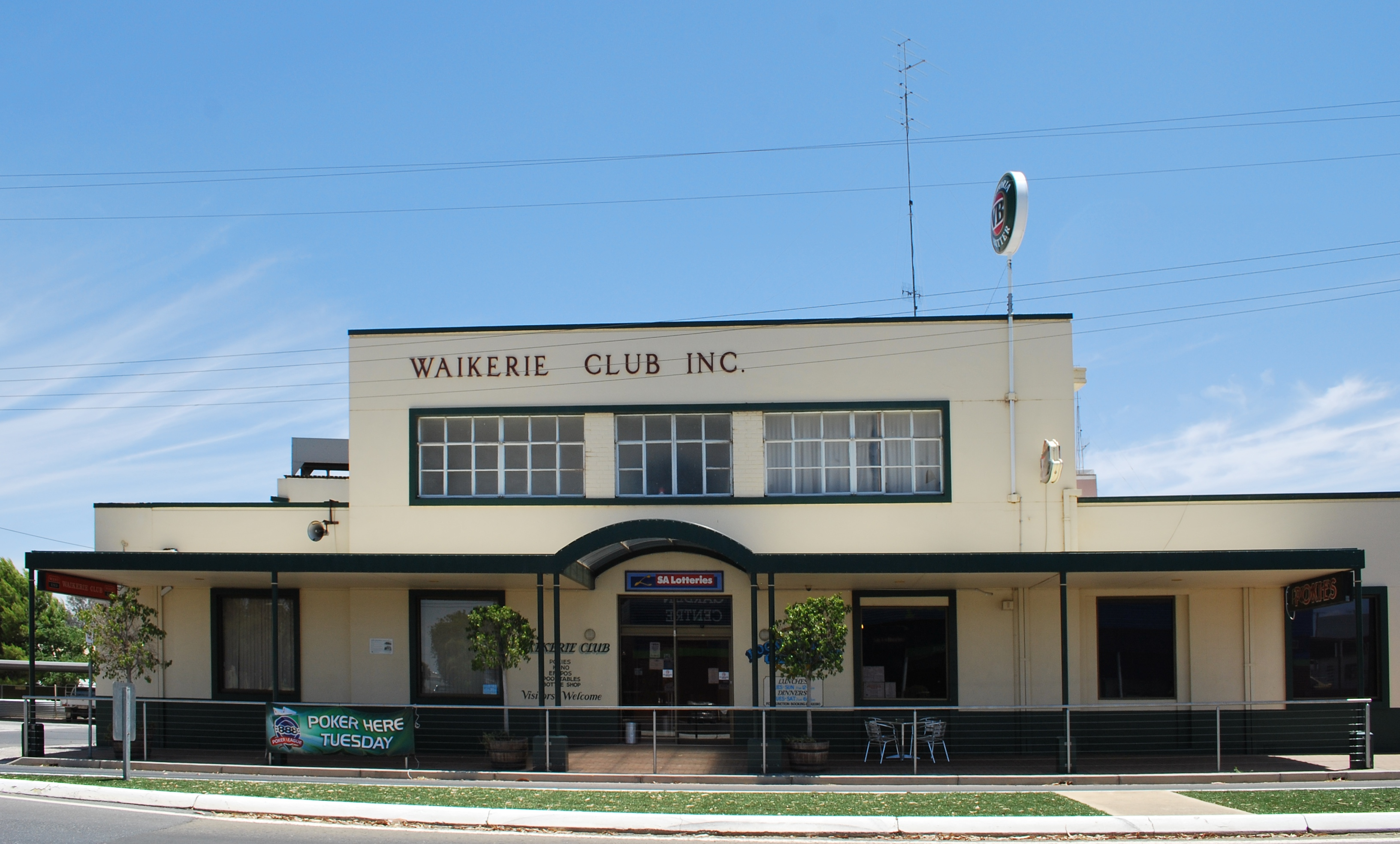
Waikerie Club

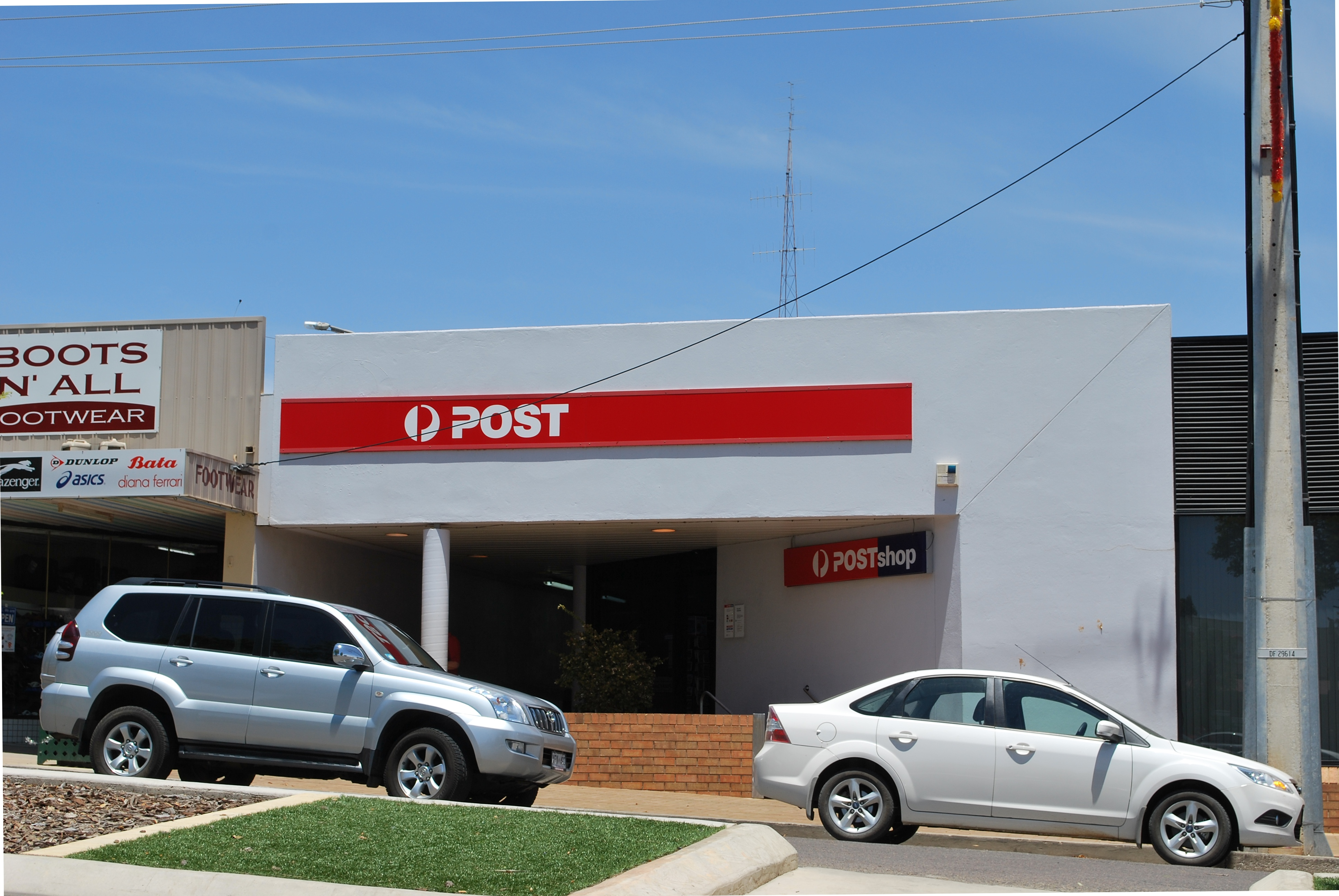
Post Office

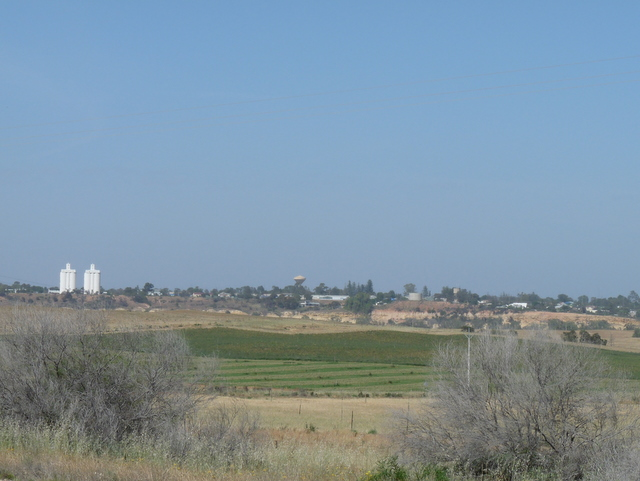
Waikerie, Riverland

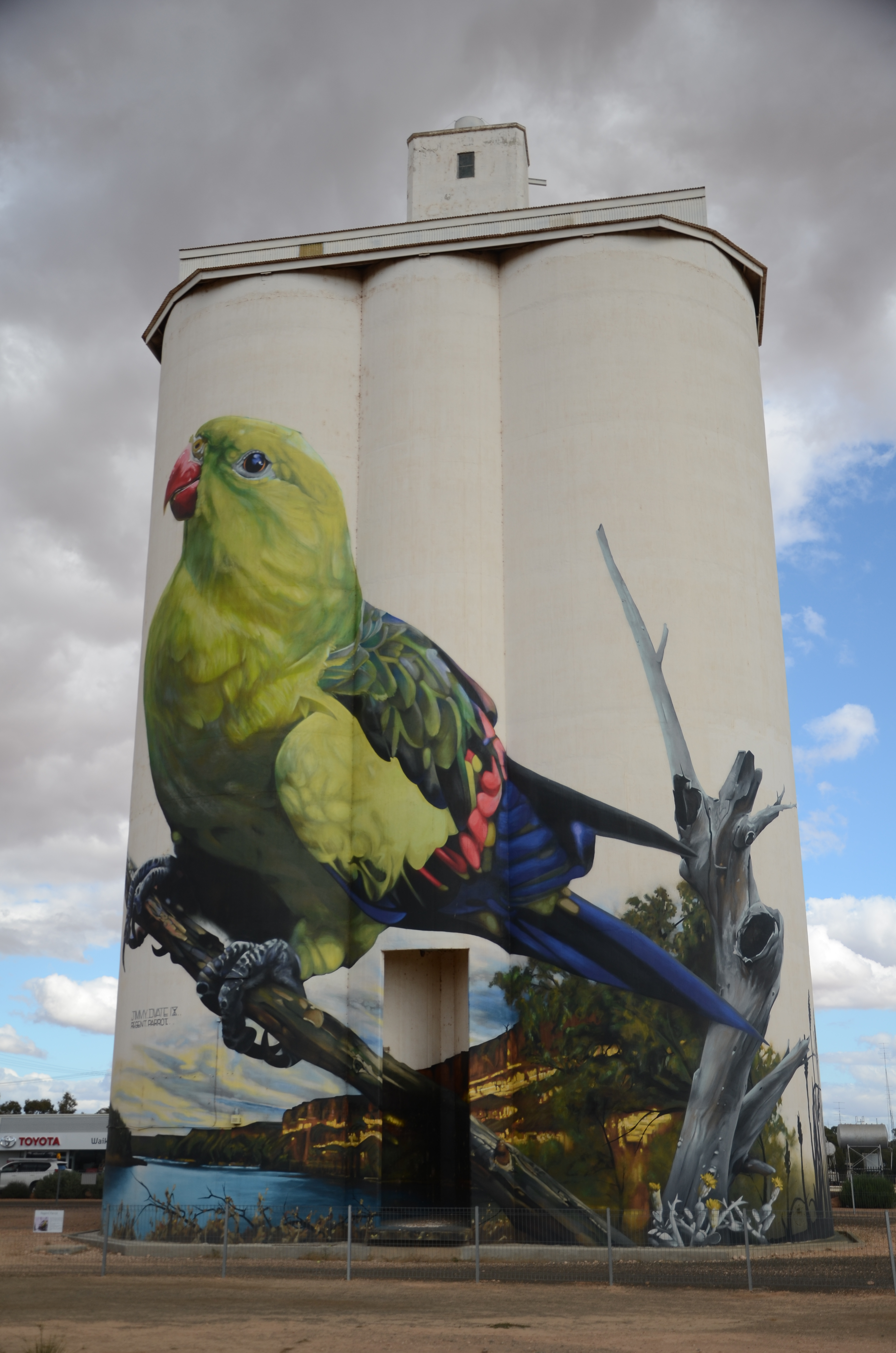
Waikerie silo art

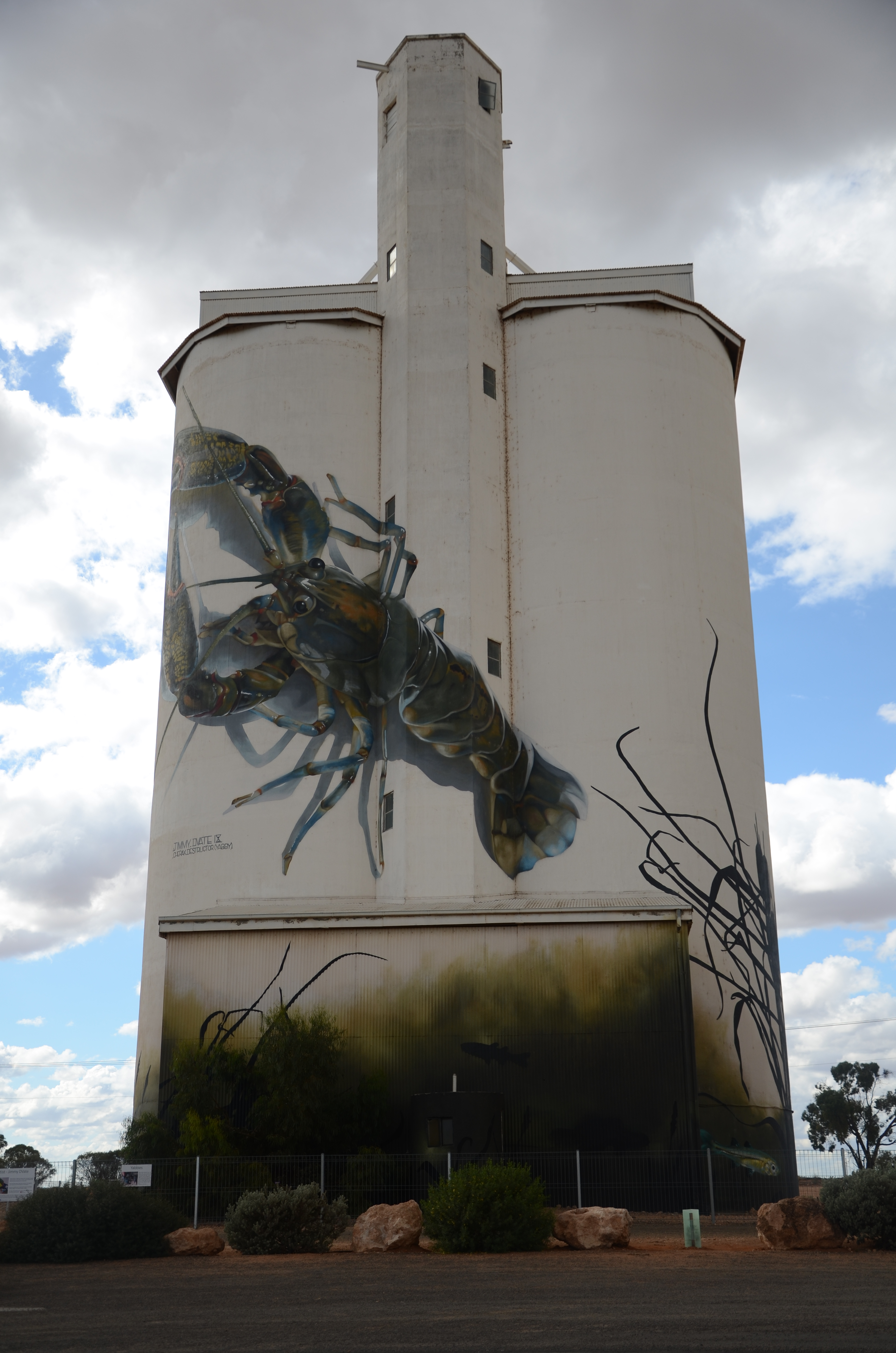
Waikerie silo art

== See also ==
- List of crossings of the Murray River
