= Overland Corner =

- Town
- Coordinates: 34°09′12″S 140°20′18″E
- Country: Australia
- State: South Australia
- LGAs: Berri Barmera Council; Pastoral Unincorporated Area
- Location: 181 km (112 mi) NE of Adelaide; 30 km (19 mi) W of Berri
- Established: 1859 (settlement); 12 August 1999 (locality)

Government
  - State electorate: Chaffey
  - Federal division: Barker

Population
  - Total: 64 (SAL 2021)
- Time zone: UTC+9:30 (ACST)
  - Summer (DST): UTC+10:30 (ACST)
- Postcode: 5330
- County: Young; Hamley
- Mean max temp: 25.0 °C (77.0 °F)
- Mean min temp: 9.7 °C (49.5 °F)
- Annual rainfall: 242.5 mm (9.55 in)
Localities around Overland Corner
Taylorville Station	Taylorville Station; Hawks Nest Station	Hawks Nest Station
Devlins Pound	Overland Corner	Monash; Barmera; Cobdogla
Good Hope Landing	Good Hope Landing; Wigley Flat; Kingston On Murray	Cobdogla

Overland Corner is a locality in the Australian state of South Australia located in the state's east about 181 kilometres (112 mi) north-east of the state capital of Adelaide and about 30 kilometres (19 mi) west of the municipal seat in Berri.

It is located on the Murray River in the Riverland area of South Australia, near Barmera and Cobdogla. The area had traditionally been used as an aboriginal camping ground and was then used by drovers taking stock from New South Wales to Adelaide.

When the New South Wales gold rush began in 1851, Overland Corner developed as a point where timber was supplied to fuel paddle steamers taking prospectors up the Murray River. A small police post was established in Overland Corner in 1855, built by Edward Bate Scott. It closed in 1894. A school was opened and remained open until at least 1904.

The historic Overland Corner Hotel was built in 1859. It closed in 1897 but still stands, reopened in 1965, at the centre of what is now the National Trust of South Australia's Overland Corner Reserve. It is listed on the South Australian Heritage Register.

Boundaries were created on 12 August 1999 for the "long established name" which included the former Overland Corner Shack Site and the former Lock 3 Shack Site. On 26 April 2013, "unincorporated land" was added to the locality.

Pooginook is located within the federal division of Barker, the state electoral district of Chaffey and the local government areas of the Berri Barmera Council and the Pastoral Unincorporated Area.
