= Glossop, South Australia =

Glossop
- Town
- Coordinates: 34°16′S 140°31′E
- Country: Australia
- State: South Australia
- LGA: Berri Barmera Council
- Location: 8 km (5.0 mi) W of Berri; 7 km (4.3 mi) E of Barmera
- Established: 25 August 1921 (town); 3 December 1998 (locality)

Government
  - State electorate: Chaffey
  - Federal division: Barker

Population
  - Total: 919 (SAL 2021)
- Time zone: UTC+9:30 (ACST)
  - Summer (DST): UTC+10:30 (ACDT)
- Postcode: 5344
Localities around Glossop
	Monash
Barmera	Glossop	Berri
	Winkie	Gurra Gurra

Glossop is a small town in the Riverland region of South Australia. It was gazetted in 1921 as the town in a soldier settlement area after the First World War and was named after Admiral Glossop, who had been in command of HMAS Sydney when it sank SMS Emden in 1914. At the 2016 census, Glossop had a population of 984.

== Local area and surrounds ==
Glossop has a population of around 984. Berri Estates, a large winery originally owned by a local co-operative but now owned by Constellation Brands, is located near the centre of Glossop. It is the home of Rivergum Christian College Glossop Primary School and Glossop High School, one of the region's four public high schools (the others are at Loxton, Waikerie and Renmark).

Although one of the smaller towns of South Australia's Riverland region, Glossop has a gallery of Australian Aboriginal art, a small deli (in the Australian sense of the word), two petrol stations, and some hardware shops. It also has a Sikh Temple. It is on the Old Sturt Highway, between the more major towns of Barmera and Berri. Glossop also has a motel outside which is situated Captain Glossop's Anchor.

Glossop is one of the few Riverland towns that do not have frontage with the Murray River. Other towns of this nature include Monash and Yamba, the gateway to the Riverland from the Victorian border.

== Governance ==
Glossop is in the Berri Barmera Council local government area, the state electorate of Chaffey and the federal division of Barker.

== See also ==
- Glossop (disambiguation)
