= Gerard, South Australia =

Gerard
- Suburb
- Coordinates: 34°22′37″S 140°28′40″E
- Country: Australia
- State: South Australia
- LGA: Pastoral Unincorporated Area
- Location: 182 km (113 mi) north-east of Adelaide; 12 km (7.5 mi) north-west of Loxton
- Established: 12 August 1999

Government
  - State electorate: Chaffey
  - Federal division: Barker

Population
  - Total: 50 (2021 census)
- Time zone: UTC+9:30 (ACST)
  - Summer (DST): UTC+10:30 (ACST)
- Postcode: 5343
- County: Hamley
- Mean max temp: 23.9 °C (75.0 °F)
- Mean min temp: 9.0 °C (48.2 °F)
- Annual rainfall: 259.5 mm (10.22 in)
Suburbs around Gerard
Spectacle Lake	Spectacle Lake	Winkie
Spectacle Lake	Gerard	Katarapko
Pyap	Pyap	Katarapko
- Location; Climate; Adjoining localities

Gerard is a locality in the Australian state of South Australia located in the Riverland on the northern side of the Murray River about 182 kilometres (113 miles) north-east of the state capital of Adelaide and about 12 kilometres (7.5 mi) northwest of Loxton.

Its boundaries were created on 12 August 1999.

As of 2012, the land use within Gerard is divided between conservation and agriculture with the former being concerned with the floodplain. The title for land within Gerard held by the Aboriginal Lands Trust who has leased it to the Gerard Community Council.

Gerard is located within the federal division of Barker, the state electoral district of Chaffey and the Pastoral Unincorporated Area of South Australia.

== See also ==
- Gerard (disambiguation)
