= Spectacle Lake, South Australia =

Spectacle Lake South Australia
- Coordinates: 34.364690°S 140.434390°E
- Population: 660 (shared with other localities in the ‘State Suburb of Loveday’) (2011 census)
- Established: 12 August 1999
- Postcode(s): 5345
- Time zone: ACST (UTC+9:30)
  - Summer (DST): ACST (UTC+10:30)
- Location: 180 km (112 mi) north-east of Adelaide city centre; 16 km (10 mi) north-west of Loxton
- LGA(s): Unincorporated area
- County: Hamley
- State electorate(s): Chaffey
- Federal division(s): Barker
Mean max temp	Mean min temp	Annual rainfall
23.9 °C; 75 °F	9.0 °C; 48 °F	259.5 mm 10.2 in
Suburbs around Spectacle Lake:
New Residence	Loveday	Winkie
New Residence	Spectacle Lake	Gerard
New Residence	New Residence; Pyap	Pyap
- Footnotes: Location; Coordinates; Climate; Adjoining localities

Spectacle Lake is a locality in the Australian state of South Australia located in the Riverland on the northern side of the Murray River about 180 kilometres (110 miles) north-east of the Adelaide city centre and about 16 kilometres (9.9 mi) northwest of Loxton. Its boundaries were created in August 1999 along with the selection of its name which was derived from the Spectacle Lakes, a lake system which is situated within the locality on the floodplain of the Murray River. In 2014, a portion of Spectacle Lake was removed and added to the adjoining locality of Loveday to ensure the full extent of Nynes Island is within Loveday. As of 2012, the land use within Spectacle Lake was divided between conservation and agriculture with the former being concerned with the floodplain. Spectacle Lake is located within the federal division of Barker, the state electoral district of Chaffey and the unincorporated area of South Australia.

== See also ==
- Spectacle Lake (disambiguation)
