= Gerard Community Council =

Coordinates: 34°22′35″S 140°28′45″E

- Local government area
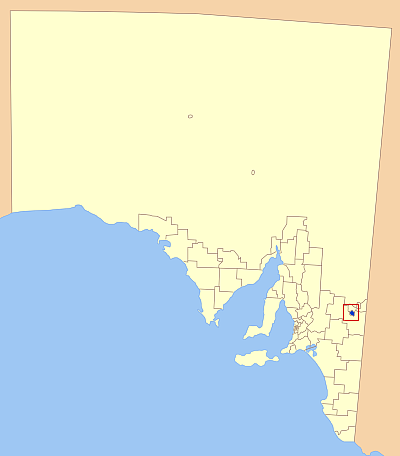
- Location of the Gerard Community Council in blue
- Country: Australia
- State: South Australia
- Region: Murray and Mallee
- Established: 1974
- Council seat: Winkie

Government
  - State electorate: Chaffey
  - Federal division: Barker

Area
  - Total: 85.9 km^{2} (33.2 sq mi)

Population
  - Total: 96 (2006)
  - Density: 1.118/km^{2} (2.895/sq mi)
LGAs around Gerard Community Council
| Berri Barmera | Berri Barmera | Berri Barmera |
| Loxton Waikerie | Gerard Community Council | Berri Barmera |
| Loxton Waikerie | Loxton Waikerie | Berri Barmera |

The Gerard Community Council is a small, Aboriginally controlled local government area located in The Riverland, South Australia. The community is dependent on the River Murray, with some horticulture and grazing in the district. Traditional crafts are also produced in the community, with part of the community economy derived from the sale of these to tourists.

== History ==
The area was established when the United Aborigines Mission initiated the Gerard Mission in 1945 on over 5,000 acres (20 km^{2}) of land purchased downriver from Loxton. Gerard replaced the mission at Swan Reach and its inhabitants were moved to the Gerard mission. There was initially great aspiration for the mission, particularly after a very favourable assessment by CG Grasby, the District Horticultural Adviser, with a full report produced and guidelines for irrigation and plantings provided, and a start made with 300 grape vines.

Pre-fabricated huts were obtained from an old Army camp and other fittings from a Woodcutters’ Camp at Loveday. The Gerard Mission school was opened in 1946, after the school at Swan Reach had closed the previous December.

As well as transferring Aboriginal people from Swan Reach, some were brought to Gerard from Ooldea, in South Australia’s far west. The aspirations of self-sufficiency were never achieved, despite considerable clearing and planting of citrus and stone fruit trees, and herds of sheep and cows.

By 1946 the Aboriginal residents were given the chance to have some say in organising their community and formed their own council for welfare and social activities, under the overall management of a government superintendent. In 1974 the reserve was handed to the Aboriginal Lands Trust, and operated under its own full council.

In the late 1980s the Gerard community revived traditional crafts using the work of Edward Eyre and others as reference.
