= Cooltong, South Australia =

Cooltong South Australia
- Coordinates: 34°05′08″S 140°40′30″E
- Population: 322 (SAL 2021)
- Established: 1 March 1951 (town); 16 March 2000 (locality)
- Postcode(s): 5341
- LGA(s): Renmark Paringa Council
- Region: Murray and Mallee
- County: Hamley
- State electorate(s): Chaffey
- Federal division(s): Barker
Localities around Cooltong:
	Calperum Station
Calperum Station	Cooltong	Chaffey
Monash	Renmark West	Renmark North

Cooltong is a town and locality in the Australian state of South Australia.

The name Cooltong is derived from a local Aboriginal name meaning "lizard place", and had been in use in the area for many decades before the town was established. The first instance of the name Cooltong in the South Australian newspapers was in 1898, reporting on an unusual weather event that occurred near Renmark, beginning in the Cooltong Hills. The town of Cooltong was surveyed in 1949. Much of the land was granted as soldier settlement blocks after World War II, and is irrigated and planted with grapevines, citrus or other fruit trees.

The Cooltong Conservation Park is southwest of the town.
