= Calperum Station, South Australia =

Calperum Station South Australia
- Coordinates: 33°47′39″S 140°34′29″E
- Population: 0 (SAL 2021)
- Established: 26 April 2013
- Postcode(s): 5341
- Time zone: ACST (UTC+9:30)
  - Summer (DST): ACST (UTC+10:30)
- Location: 250 km (155 mi) E of Adelaide city centre; 10 km (6 mi) N of Renmark
- LGA(s): Pastoral Unincorporated Area
- County: Hamley
- State electorate(s): Chaffey; Stuart
- Federal division(s): Barker; Grey
Localities around Calperum Station:
| Canegrass | Pine Valley Station; Danggali | Danggali |
| Canegrass; Parcoola; Gluepot; Taylorville Station | Calperum Station | Chowilla |
| Hawks Nest Station | Monash; Cooltong; Chaffey | Renmark North; Murtho |
- Footnotes: Location; Adjoining localities

Calperum Station is a locality in the Australian state of South Australia located on the northern side of the Murray River about 10 kilometres (6.2 miles) to the north of the town of Renmark and about 250 kilometres (160 miles) east of the centre of the capital city of Adelaide.

The locality was established on 26 April 2013 in respect to "the long established local name". Its name is derived from the former pastoral lease of the same name with the addition of the word "Station" to distinguish it from another locality elsewhere in South Australia.

Calperum Station is located within the federal divisions of Barker and Grey, the state electoral district of Chaffey, the Pastoral Unincorporated Area of South Australia and the state’s Murray and Mallee region.

The land use within Calperum Station is concerned with the protected area which is also known as Calperum Station and which has been fully occupied its extent since its establishment in 2013.

== See also ==
- List of cities and towns in South Australia
