= Taylorville Station, South Australia =

Taylorville Station South Australia
- Coordinates: 33°55′33″S 140°11′17″E
- Established: 2013
- Postcode(s): 5330
- Time zone: ACST (UTC+9:30)
  - Summer (DST): ACST (UTC+10:30)
- Location: 250 km (155 mi) northeast of Adelaide; 35 km (22 mi) north west of Renmark
- LGA(s): Pastoral Unincorporated Area; District Council of Loxton Waikerie
- Region: Murray and Mallee
- County: Young; Hamley
- State electorate(s): Chaffey; Stuart
- Federal division(s): Barker; Grey
Localities around Taylorville Station:
Bunyung	Gluepot	Calperum Station
Westons Flat	Taylorville Station	Calperum Station
Markaranka	Pooginook; Devlins Pound; Overland Corner	Hawks Nest
- Footnotes: Location; Adjoining localities

Taylorville Station is a locality in the Australian state of South Australia located about 250 kilometres (160 miles) north-east of the Adelaide and about 35 kilometres (22 miles) to the north-west of the municipal seat of Renmark.

The locality was established on 26 April 2013 in respect to “the long established local name.” Its name is derived from the former pastoral lease of the same name with the addition of the word “Station” to distinguish it from the locality of Taylorville on the north bank of the Murray River 50 km southwest of Taylorville Station.

Taylorville Station is located within the federal divisions of Barker and Grey, the state electoral districts of Chaffey and Stuart, the state's Murray and Mallee region, the Pastoral Unincorporated Area of South Australia and partly in the local government area of the District Council of Loxton Waikerie.

The land use within Taylorville Station is concerned with the following protected area which is also known as Taylorville Station and which has fully occupied its extent since its establishment in 2013.

== See also ==
- List of cities and towns in South Australia
