= Gluepot =

Gluepot may refer to:

- Gluepot, South Australia, a locality north of Waikerie
  - Gluepot Reserve a private protected area after which the locality is named
  - Gluepot Station, a pastoral lease now used as the Gluepot Reserve.
- the Gluepot Tavern, a former live music venue in Auckland, New Zealand
