= Katarapko, South Australia =

Katarapko South Australia
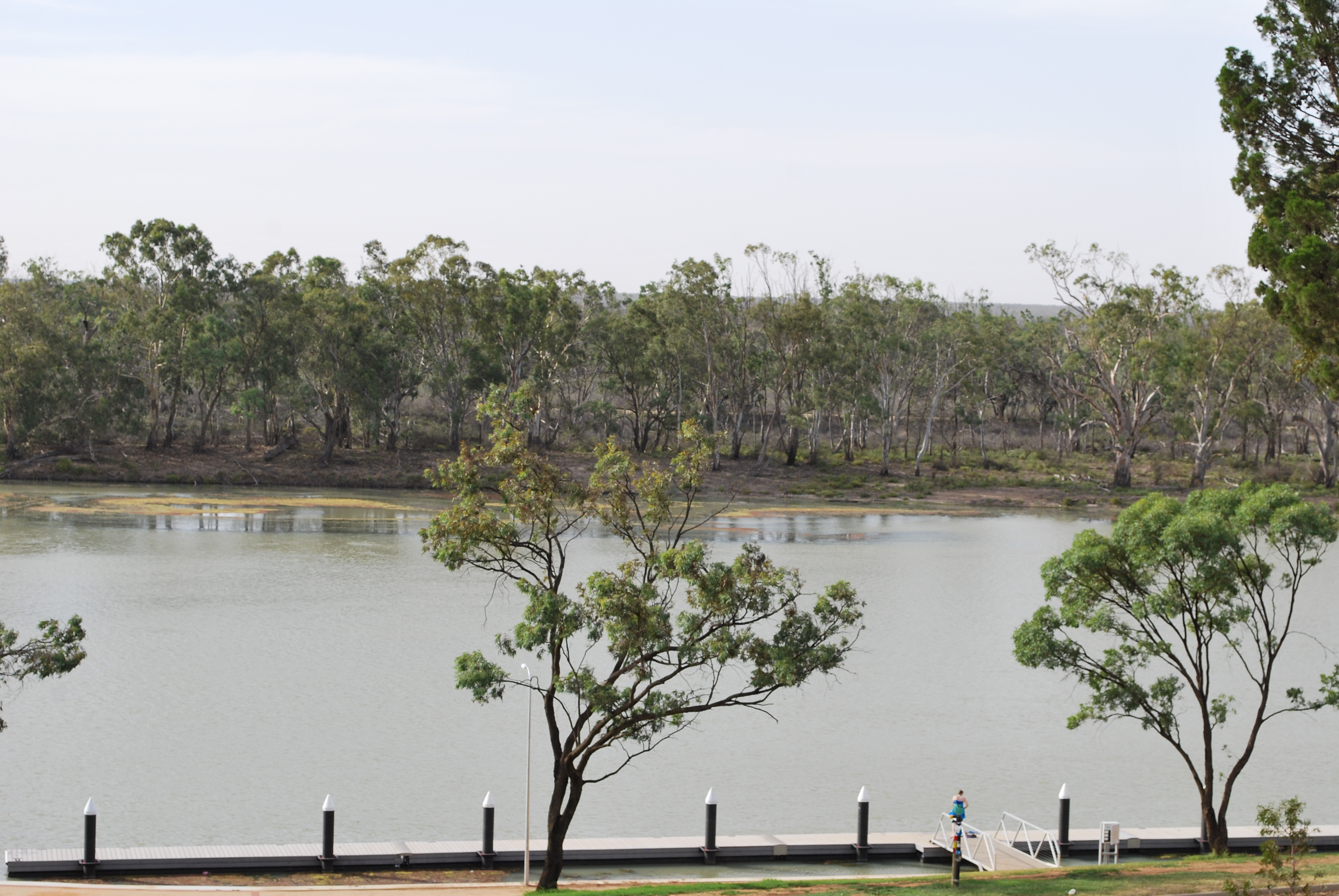
- Katarapko as viewed from Loxton.

- Coordinates: 34°23′25″S 140°33′43″E
- Population: 0 (SAL 2016)
- Established: 12 August 1999
- Postcode(s): 5343
- Time zone: ACST (UTC+9:30)
  - Summer (DST): ACST (UTC+10:30)
- Location: 188 km (117 mi) north-east of Adelaide; 6.6 km (4 mi) north of Loxton
- LGA(s): Berri Barmera Council
- County: Hamley
- State electorate(s): Chaffey
- Federal division(s): Barker
Mean max temp	Mean min temp	Annual rainfall
23.9 °C; 75 °F	9.0 °C; 48 °F	259.5 mm 10.2 in
Suburbs around Katarapko:
Gerard	Winkie	Bookpurnong
Gerard; Pyap	Katarapko	Loxton North
Pyap	Loxton	Loxton
- Footnotes: Distances; Adjoining localities

Katarapko is a locality in the Australian state of South Australia located in the Riverland about 188 kilometres (117 miles) north-east of the state capital of Adelaide and about 6.6 kilometres (4.1 mi) north of Loxton.

During World War II, Katarapko Island was the site of the Katarapko Wood Camp, one of three prisoner camps in the area attached to the main Loveday Camp complex. The others were located at Moorook West and Woolenook.

Its boundaries were created in 1999 along with the selection of its name which was derived from Katarapko Island. Its extent includes all of Katarapko Island and some land located to the immediate west of the island. It is bounded on all sides by the following watercourses with exception to part of its western and northern sides - the Katarapko Creek and the Murray River. The southern boundary was revised in 2014 to "ensure the whole of Kapunda Island is within the rural locality of Loxton."

The land within the locality is zoned for conservation with the locality being completely occupied by most of the Katarapko section of the Murray River National Park.

The 2016 Australian census which was conducted in August 2016 reports that Katarapko had a population of zero.

Katarapko is located within the federal division of Barker, the state electoral district of Chaffey and the local government area of the Berri Barmera Council.
