= A. E. Gerard =

South Australian electrician and businessman

- Born: Alfred Edward Gerard; 11 August 1877; Aberdeen, Burra, South Australia, Australia
- Died: 13 October 1950 (aged 73); Prospect, South Australia, Australia
- Occupations: Electrician, businessman
- Spouse: Elsie Goodman (m. 1902)
- Children: 4

Alfred Edward Gerard (11 August 1877 – 13 October 1950), generally known as A. E. Gerard, was an Australian electrician and businessman who founded the Adelaide companies, Gerard & Goodman and Clipsal.

== History ==
William Gerard (c. 1843 – c. 24 May 1916) of Tintinhull, Somerset, married Emily Russell (c. 1845 – 14 June 1908) on 12 October 1865. Two months later they left for South Australia on the Trevelyan, arriving at Port Adelaide on 22 March 1866, and made straight for Burra, where he found work as a trolley driver at the mine. They had two children: Sarah Ann "Annie" Gerard (1872 – 20 May 1946), who married James Thomas Walker on 27 June 1894 and lived at Burra, and Alfred Edward Gerard.

Alfred was born in Aberdeen, Burra, South Australia, the son of William Gerard and Emily née Russell. He was educated at Burra Public School, and his first job was with John Perry's Burra Carriage Factory, then in 1894 left for Western Australia. There he worked for the Railways, then for William Sandover & Co. in Fremantle. He then worked for a time as a bread carter, then as head storeman for Throssell, Son, & Stewart at Northam. He went for a short time to the goldfields of Kalgoorlie, then at the urging of his sister Annie returned to South Australia, but shortly moved to Broken Hill, where he opened his own camera shop in 1897. After three years he returned to Adelaide, and found work with flour millers Edwin Davey & Sons in Salisbury, as engineer and manager of their electric lighting plant. Annie introduced him to Elsie Goodman; they married on 26 March 1902.

They moved to Adelaide, renting a house at 20 Vine Street, Prospect, and finding work with the electrical firm Davis Purvis, then moving on to the well-known company of Ellis & Clark. In 1907, with a loan of £100 from his father-in-law William Goodman (c. 1838 – 29 May 1909) of "Ashfield", Salisbury, he set up his own contracting business in their rented home, and soon had enough work to hire an assistant. When his workforce had reached five he moved the business into the basement of the bicycle shop at 200 Rundle Street east. The company name "Gerard and Goodman" was registered on 3 August 1908 and in 1910 they moved; for a few months they rented premises in Twin Street. then to 100 Pirie Street, and soon took over the shop next door, number 102. The company was incorporated on 15 March 1912. In 1920 Gerard & Goodman began making conduit fittings, branded "Clipsal", referring to their fittings being compatible with those from other manufacturers. In 1921 he bought the company's first freehold property, in Synagogue Place. As business expanded and diversified, he bought the shop at 132 Rundle street for an electrical and radio retail and repair shop. That arm of the business was later transferred to 192–196 Rundle Street east, adjacent to the Synagogue Place warehouse, which had meanwhile expanded to four storeys.

In 1909, he founded the South Australian Electrical Importers & Suppliers Association (later Electrical Wholesalers Association).

In 1932, the company Gerard Ltd. was registered and at this time Gerard was recorded as living at 10 Thorngate Street, Thorngate.

== Religion and community service ==
He was for 40 years a member of and lay preacher at Prospect Methodist Church and author of Ears of Corn published in 1947.

On his travels through the Australian outback he became aware of the number of children of Aboriginal women who had been fathered by itinerant European men, and appeared to be suffering neglect and susceptible to exploitation. The United Aborigines Mission (UAM) was founded in 1929 to bring education to isolated Aboriginal children, and following a policy which is now discredited but honourable and based on Christian values, this involved children being displaced from their families, sometimes unwillingly. Gerard was at the forefront in founding and financially supporting the UAM, which operated Colebrook Children's Home in Quorn, and another with the same name in Eden Hills in the Adelaide Hills, to host these children.

In 1945, he financed the purchase of 5,800 acres (2,300 ha) at Winkie on the River Murray between Berri and Barmera for the UAM and named Gerard Aboriginal Community in his honour. A. E. Gerard had a hands-on involvement in the Community's management, but after his death the facility became so run down that the Gerard brothers took away the portrait of their father and persuaded the UAM to sell the property to the Department of Aboriginal Affairs.

His wife Elsie reached the stage where she required nursing care, and was moved into Resthaven Nursing Home, Leabrook. In gratitude for the care she received there, Alf commissioned the architect Gordon Brown to design and build what came to be called the Gerard Memorial Chapel in their grounds. It was opened on Saturday 3 May 1958; Elsie died a little over a year later. In 1988 the Gerard brothers established a chapel maintenance fund in her memory. Alfred and Elsie were buried in the Payneham cemetery, as were many of their family.

== Family ==
Alfred married Elsie Maria Goodman (c. 1878 – 6 June 1959) on 26 March 1902. They had four sons and lived at 9 Highbury Street, Prospect, South Australia. then 10 Thorngate Street, Thorngate.

- (Alfred) Hubert Gerard (14 March 1903 – 22 March 1992) married Doris Alma Reid ( – 25 August 1932) in October 1927. He married again, to Ivy Emerald Violet Gurner ( – c. 12 April 2000). His daughter Nancy Joy Gerard (28 May 1932 – ) married Ian MacLeod, mayor of Brighton.
- (William) Geoffrey Gerard (16 June 1907 – 21 February 1994) CMG was born in Salisbury, South Australia and educated at Adelaide Technical High School. He was managing director of Gerard Industries Pty Ltd. 1930–1976 (see main article) He married Elsie Lesetta Lowe ( – c. 7 January 2012) on 10 November 1932. They had two children:

- Robert Geoffrey Gerard (3 January 1945 – ) oversaw the rapid expansion of the family company from 1976

- Simon Gerard was appointed chief executive officer of Gerard Lighting in 2010.

- Margaret Lesetta Gerard (5 November 1940 – )

- Kenneth Edward "Ken" Gerard (24 February 1912 – 3 May 1993) BEng. was educated at North Adelaide Public School, Prince Alfred College and the University of Adelaide. He married Hestia Mary "Hess" Follett ( – 8 April 1978) in 1935. He married again in 1974, to Audrey Gabrielle "Gay" Horowitz, née Schultze (1919 – c. 4 July 1994).

- Helen Mary Gerard (27 February 1942 – )
- Ronald Edward "Ron" Gerard (28 September 1944 – )
- John Douglas Gerard (9 April 1947 – )

- Jack Hamilton Gerard (27 September 1915 – 31 December 2005) educated at North Adelaide Public School, and Prince Alfred College and the School of Mines. He married Flaida May "Maye" Evans ( – 6 November 1989) on 28 October 1938. He married again, to Rita Joyce Luke, née Rogers (1917 – 28 December 2007) on 11 June 1992

- Anthony Gordon Gerard (23 August 1941 – )
- Frances Gerard (5 November 1943 – )

== Recognition ==
Alfred Edward Gerard's name has been commemorated on one of the plaques of the Jubilee 150 Walkway, North Terrace, Adelaide.

== Publications ==
- Ears of Corn (1944) A collection of his best sermons as a lay preacher, Prospect Methodist Church.
- History of the U.A.M. (c. 1945) A first-hand account – Gerard was on the executive of the United Aborigines' Mission from the early 1930s.
