= Gerard (disambiguation) =

Gerard or Gérard is a given name and a surname.

Gerard may also refer to:

== Music ==
- Gerard (band), a Japanese progressive rock band
- Gerard, a Colorado band fronted by Gerard McMahon
  - Gerard (album), an album by Gerard

== Places ==
- Gerard Bluffs, ice-free bluffs in the Miller Range in Antarctica
- Gerard, South Australia
  - Gerard Community Council, a local government area
- Gerard (crater), a lunar crater

== Titles ==
- Baron Gerard, a peerage of the United Kingdom
- Gerard baronets, three baronetcies

== Other uses ==
- Hotel Gerard, a hotel in New York City

== See also ==
- Gerardia (disambiguation), a genus of flowering plants
