= Pyap, South Australia =

Pyap South Australia
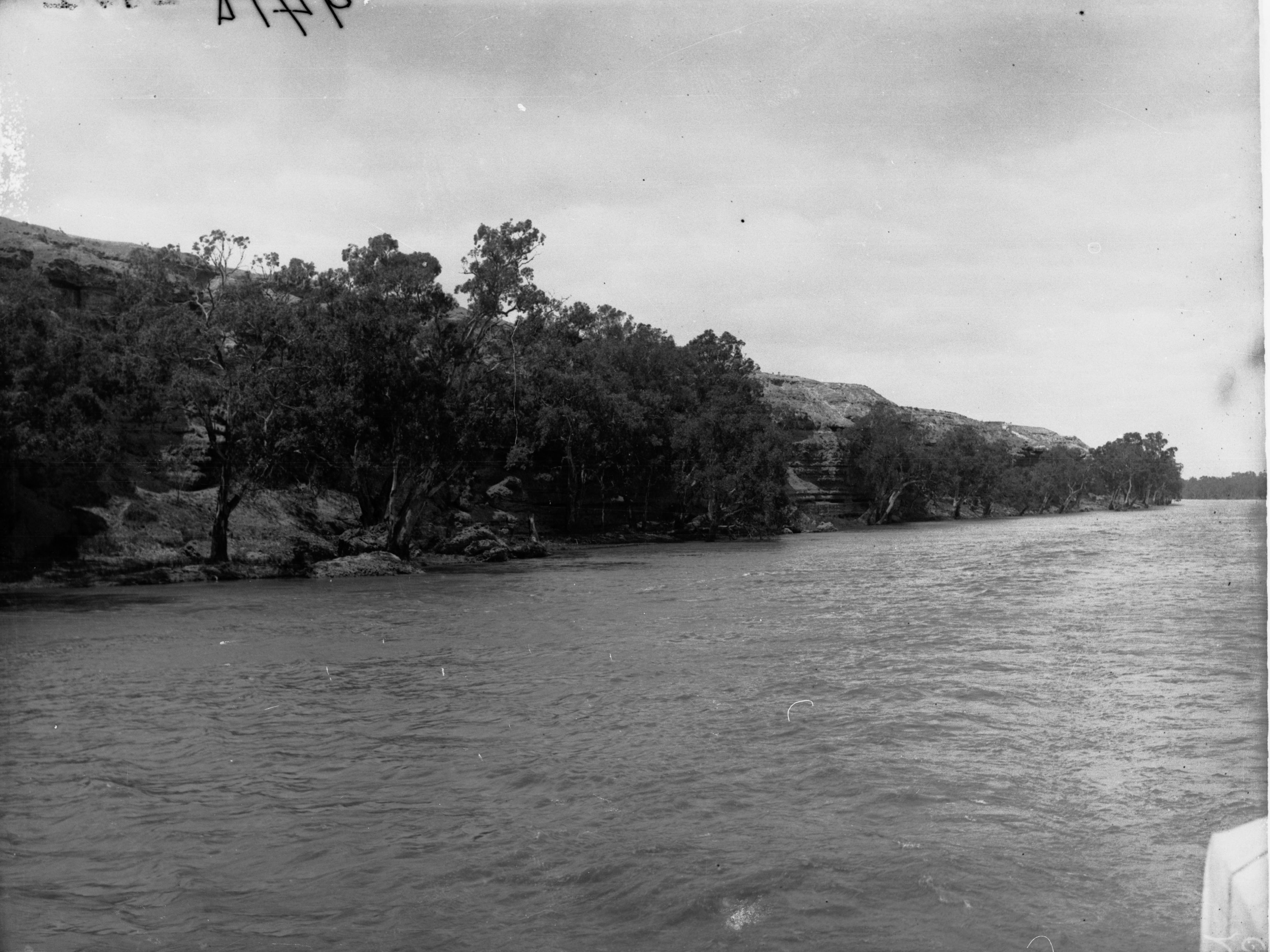
- Great Pyap Landing, ca. 1924

- Coordinates: 34°26′51″S 140°29′48″E
- Population: 175 (SAL 2021)
- Postcode(s): 5333
- Time zone: ACST (UTC+9:30)
  - Summer (DST): ACST (UTC+10:30)
- County: Alfred
- State electorate(s): Chaffey
- Federal division(s): Barker
Mean max temp	Mean min temp	Annual rainfall
24.0 °C; 75 °F	9.1 °C; 48 °F	263.2 mm 10.4 in
Localities around Pyap:
New Residence; Wappilka	Spectacle Lake; Gerard	Katarapko
Wunkar	Pyap	Loxton
	Pyap West
- Footnotes: Adjoining localities

Pyap is a locality in the Riverland region of South Australia. It is on the left (south) bank of the Murray River about 7 km downstream from Loxton. It includes both flat land near the river and higher land away from it. The environment is dry, so vineyards and orchards are irrigated from the river. It lies on the Kingston Road from Loxton, at the junction with the Stott Highway towards Swan Reach.

Pyap was first settled as a Village Settlement in March 1894 with 94 members and 187 children on 9,145 acres (3,700 ha) and a total population of 388. The founding chairman was A. H. Brocklehurst and the secretary J. W. Rawnsley.

In about 1900 the government became tired of trying to keep the settlement going and when most of the village settlers abandoned the settlement, sold out lock, stock and barrel to a Mildura-Melbourne syndicate who appointed Mr. William Mitchell Plant as general manager. This firm continued to run the settlement with some success until 1913 when it eventually landed with C. J. DeGaris.

The writer and ethnographer Daisy Bates lived in a tent in Pyap in the 1930s.
