= Spectacle Lake =

Spectacle Lake may refer to:

== Bodies of water ==
- Spectacle Lake (New York), in Fulton and Hamilton Counties
- Spectacle Lake (Herkimer County, New York)
- Spectacle Lake (Minnesota)
- Spectacle Lake (New Zealand)
- Spectacle Lake (Nova Scotia)
- Spectacle Lake (Washington)

== Communities ==
- Spectacle Lake, South Australia, a locality
- Spectacle Lake Provincial Park, British Columbia
