= Clipsal =

Australian electrical accessories brand

Clipsal logo

Clipsal is an Australian brand of electrical accessories. Its primary factory, once located at Bowden, moved to Gepps Cross. Smaller factories in South Australia at Nuriootpa, Strathalbyn, Wingfield, and in Bayswater, Victoria have closed and production has moved to Gepps Cross and to offshore locations. From 2000 to 2017, Clipsal was the naming rights sponsor for the Adelaide 500 Supercars race.

Since 2004 Clipsal Australia has been a subsidiary of Schneider Electric.

== History ==
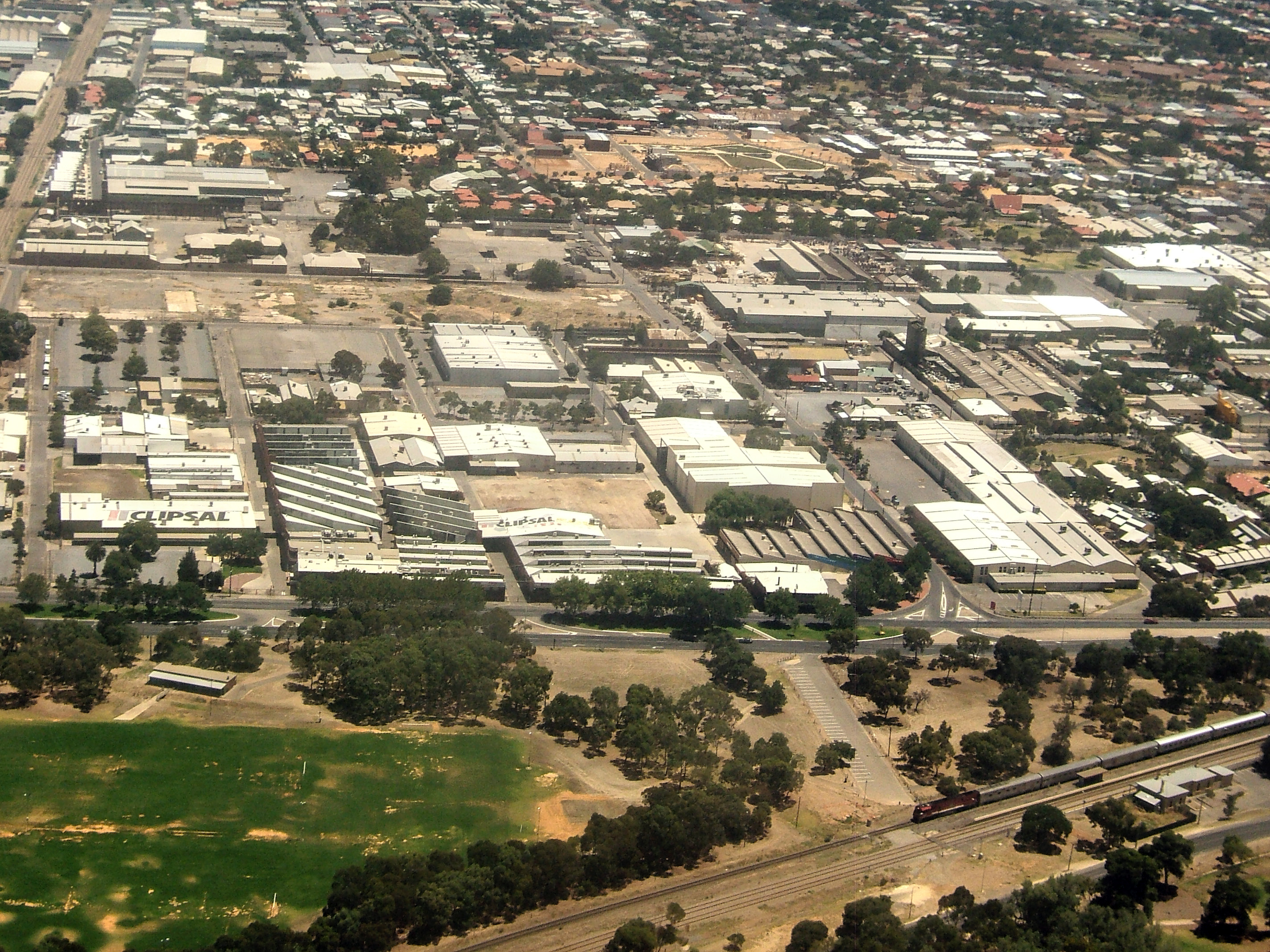
The former Clipsal factory in Bowden in the foreground

Clipsal was established by Alfred Gerard in Adelaide, Australia in 1920. Clipsal began by selling a range of adjustable sheet metal fittings which joined the various imported conduits of differing diameters found in Australia at the time. These products helped give the company its name, the phrase "clips all" being abridged to Clipsal. Alfred's son Geoff took over the company and spearheaded several manufacturing breakthroughs, including the invention of the first all-Australian switch in 1930. The company also performed early R&D on thermoplastics in the 1950s.

Clipsal Integrated Systems, a division of Clipsal, was responsible for the creation of the C-Bus product range and accompanying protocol used in home automation.

Clipsal entered into a collaboration agreement with "The Smart Company" in 1995, and later entered into a Heads of Agreement in 1996. These agreements led to the development of the Clipsal Home Minder, which was sold until 2004.

In 2004, Clipsal Australia became majority-owned by Schneider Electric.

== Litigation ==
From 2004 to 2011, Clipsal Integrated Systems, Clipsal Technologies Australia and Clipsal Australia were in litigation with The Smart Company Pty Ltd regarding the Clipsal Home Minder and other Smart products.

The litigation was for apparent unpaid royalties to The Smart Company pursuant to the Heads of Agreement.

The Smart Company went into liquidation on 28 May 2010. Liquidators of The Smart Company went to the Supreme Court to gain control of the Clipsal case. Prior to liquidation, director Dorothea Tomazos transferred the benefit of the case to herself for $1. In August 2010, liquidators gained control of the Clipsal case to continue the action against Clipsal (and effectively Schneider Electric) for up to $4 billion. Enterprise Global Resources, (controlled by Dorothea Tomazos) intervened as the shareholder of The Smart Company to take control of the Federal Court action, allegedly thereby delaying the case. In February 2011, Enterprise Global Resources was refused permission to maintain the proceedings.

The case was dismissed on 29 April 2011, due to The Smart Company failing to comply with the orders from November 2009 to prepare for the 12-week trial. Although the trial was scheduled to start on 31 May 2010, liquidators were unable to progress during late 2010 and early 2011 due to lacking access to documents possessed by The Smart Company relating to the action.

The liquidators filed a Notice of Appeal against the dismissal on 20 May 2011. In June 2011, the Yamaha Pitman founders attempted to resurrect the case against Clipsal Australia, filing the $3 million Deed Of Company Arrangement. The liquidators were in talks with a litigation funder, a third party, about the purchase of the Clipsal case. The liquidators discontinued the Appeal on 8 July 2011 and were ordered to pay the costs.
