= Stott Highway =

Road in South Australia

Stott Highway South Australia
- Coordinates: 34.508835°S 139.057697°E (West end); 34.448742°S 140.499087°E (East end)

General information
- Type: Highway
- Length: 144 km (89 mi)
- Gazetted: 2008

Major junctions
- West end: Eden Valley Road; Angaston, South Australia
- East end: Kingston Road; Pyap, South Australia

Location(s)
- Region: Barossa Light and Lower North, Murray and Mallee
- Major settlements: Sedan, Swan Reach

Highway system
- Highways in Australia; National Highway • Freeways in Australia; Highways in South Australia

Stott Highway is a 144-kilometre-long (89 mi) state-controlled highway in South Australia, linking Angaston in the Barossa Valley, through Sedan and Swan Reach, to Pyap in the Riverland region. It was named after Tom Stott, a member of the South Australian state parliament.

== Route ==
Stott Highway commences at the intersection with Eden Valley Road just south of Angaston and heads in an easterly direction through Keyneton and Sedan, until it reaches the western bank of the Murray River at Swan Reach: the river is traversable by vehicular ferry. On the eastern bank, the highway continues east until eventually terminating at the intersection with Kingston Road in Pyap, just west of Loxton.

== History ==
Previously known as Swan Reach Road, it was renamed Stott Highway in 2008, after Tom Stott, a long-time farmer in, and member of state parliament for, areas traversed by the highway.

== Major intersections ==
| LGA | Location | km | mi | Destinations | Notes |
|---|---|---|---|---|---|
| Barossa | Angaston | 0.0 | 0.0 | Eden Valley Road (B10) – Nurioopta, Mount Pleasant, Birdwood | Western terminus of highway |
| North Para River | | 2.2 | 1.4 | Bridge (no known official name) | |
| Mid Murray | Sedan | 27.4 | 17.0 | Halfway House Road (north) – Bower, Bundey; Ridley Road (south) – Mannum | |
| Mid Murray | Swan Reach | 54.2 | 33.7 | Murraylands Road – Morgan, Blanchetown, Mannum | |
| Murray River | | 56.4– 56.6 | 35.0– 35.2 | Swan Reach ferry | |
| Mid Murray | Swan Reach | 57.9 | 36.0 | Hunter Road (south) – Forster, Cowirra | |
| Mid Murray | Swan Reach | 58.5 | 36.4 | Hunter Road (north) – Paisley | |
| Loxton Waikerie | Loxton | 144.4 | 89.7 | Kingston Road – Kingston On Murray, Loxton | Eastern terminus of highway |
Route transition

== See also ==
- List of road routes in South Australia
