= Australian Aborigines Advocate =

Former Australian magazine

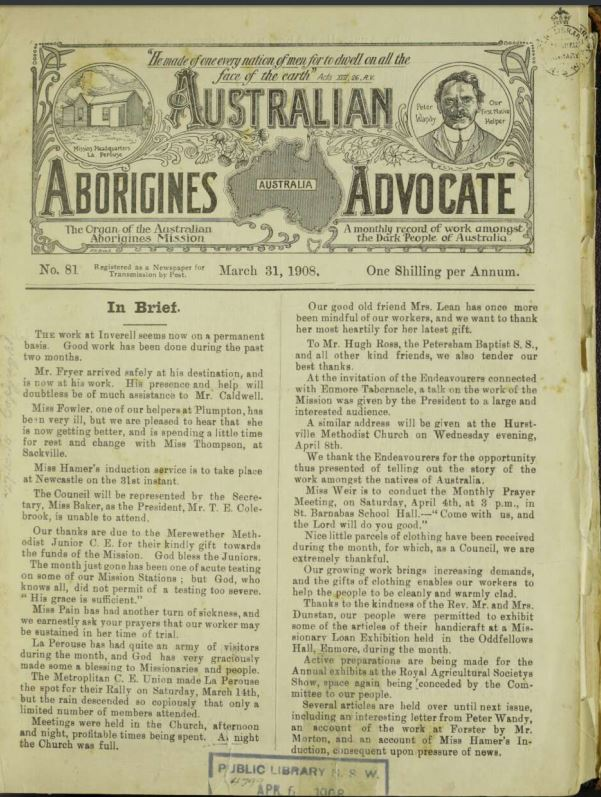
Australian Aborigines Advocate front cover, 31 March 1908.

Australian Aborigines Advocate, originally published as The New South Wales Aborigines' Advocate, was a monthly English language magazine originally published in Sydney, Australia.

== History ==
The New South Wales Aborigines' Advocate was a monthly publication of the New South Wales Aborigines' Mission, beginning on 23 July 1901 and continuing until 29 February 1908. When the mission changed its name to Australian Aborigines Mission, the publication became the Australian Aborigines' Advocate. At this time the subscription was one shilling per annum.

The publication identified itself as "the organ of the Australian Aborigines Mission" and its purpose was to be a monthly record of work amongst the Australian Aborigines. It continued until 1 February 1929. The mission once more changed name, this time to United Aborigines Mission. Its publication became The United Aborigines Messenger, which continued until April/May 1987. From 1987 until 2003 the magazine was published under the shortened title of Messenger.

== Digitisation ==
This publication has been digitised at Trove by the National Library of Australia.

== See also ==
- United Aborigines Mission
