= United Aborigines Mission =

Christian mission organisation in Australia

The United Aborigines Mission (UAM) was one of the largest Christian missions in Australia, having dozens of missionaries and mission stations across the country. From 1924 it ran residential institutions for Aboriginal children.

== History ==
The United Aborigines Mission was also known as UAM Ministries, United Aborigines' Mission (Australia), and United Aborigines' Mission of Australia through its lifetime. It was a non-denominational Protestant-based organisation, first established in New South Wales in 1895.

The UAM operated in Western Australia, New South Wales, and South Australia.

== UAM-operated missions ==
Adelaide businessman and philanthropist A. E. Gerard was involved in the founding of the South Australian branch of the UAM in 1929 and was local president and a federal delegate until his death in 1950. He published History of the UAM in 1945.

In collaboration with the South Australian Aborigines' Protection Board, the UAM ran many missions and children's homes. These included residential institutions for the care, education, and conversion of Aboriginal children to Christianity. It was mentioned in the 1997 Bringing Them Home Report as an institution that housed Indigenous children forcibly removed from their families.

In 1924, the UAM opened its first mission at Oodnadatta. In 1926, the mission moved to Quorn, where it was called the Colebrook Children's Home, and later to the Adelaide suburbs of Eden Hills and then Blackwood. It closed in 1981.

The UAM also opened missions at Swan Reach (which was later moved to Gerard and taken over by the government in 1961–2), Nepabunna, Ooldea, and Finniss Springs, a pastoral station owned by Francis Dunbar Warren (the youngest son of John Warren), and his partner Bill Wood. Francis Warren married an Arabana woman, with whom he had seven children, and around 100 Aboriginal people camped on his land. In 1939 the UAM established a church, school, and other facilities alongside to the station, where Aboriginal families could live together, find employment on the station, and where the children were taught in both traditional and European ways.

== See also ==
- Australian Aborigines advocate
