= Glossop (disambiguation) =

Glossop may refer to:

== Places ==
- Glossop, a market town within the High Peak borough of Derbyshire, England.
- Old Glossop, the original old town of Glossop, Derbyshire, England
- Glossop, South Australia, a small town in the Riverland region of South Australia.

== People ==
- Charlie Glossop (1903–1978), rugby league footballer of the 1930s for England, and Wakefield Trinity
- Christianne Glossop OBE, Chief Veterinary Officer for Wales, United Kingdom
- John Glossop (1871–1934), British naval officer
- Mick Glossop, British record producer
- Peter Glossop (1928–2008), English baritone opera singer
- Ted Glossop (1934–1998), Australian rugby league footballer and coach
- Rudolph Glossop (1902–1993), British civil engineer

== Fictional characters ==
- Tuppy Glossop, from works of P.G. Wodehouse
- Roderick Glossop, from works of P.G. Wodehouse
- Lady Glossop, from works of P.G. Wodehouse
- Honoria Glossop, from works of P.G. Wodehouse
- The Riddlers, a British children's television programme first broadcast between 1989 and 1998, features a character named Glossop
