= Francis Hamley =

(1815 – 1876) British army officer

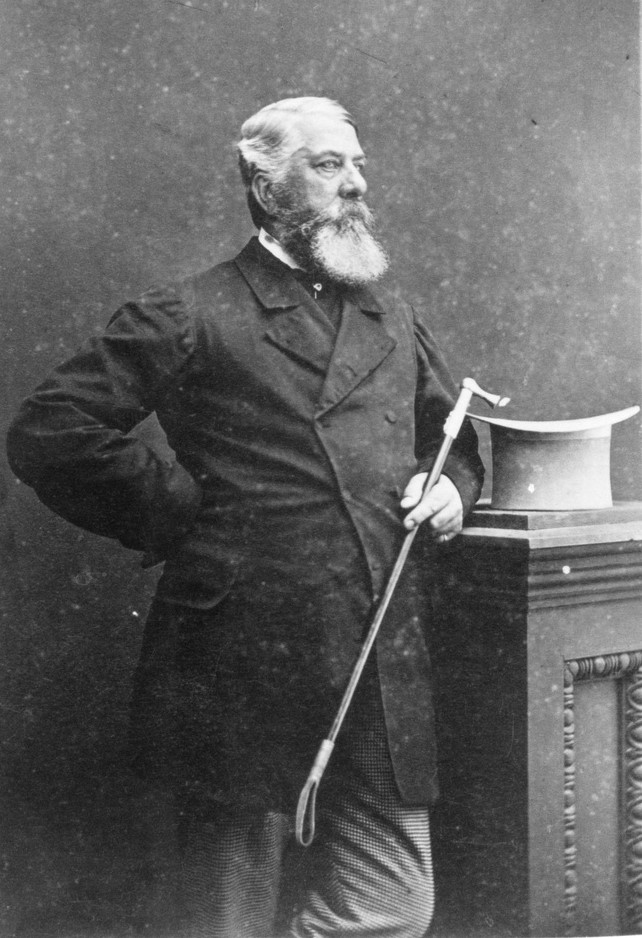

Administrator of South Australia
- Succeeded by: James Harwood Rocke

Personal details
- Born: 1815
- Died: 12 January 1876 (aged 60–61) London, England

Major-General Francis Gilbert Hamley (1815 – 12 January 1876), was a British Army officer who administered the South Australian government from 1868 to 1869.

Hamley was eldest son of Joseph Hamley and entered the army as ensign in the 12th Regiment of Foot in 1835. Hamley served in the Kaffir War and in New Zealand. He was senior officer in command of the Imperial troops in the colony of South Australia on the death of Governor Sir Dominick Daly, on 19 February 1868. The next day he was sworn in as Administrator of the Government of the Colony, and remained Chief of the Executive till the arrival of Sir James Fergusson on 15 February 1869. He was then only lieut.-colonel. General Hamley died in London on 12 January 1876.

The following places in South Australia were named for him - County of Hamley and Hamley Bridge.

Government offices
Preceded by Boyle Travers Finniss	Administrator of South Australia; 1868–1869	Succeeded by James Harwood Rocke
