= St. Peter's Lutheran Church, Loxton =

St Peter's Lutheran Church, Loxton
- Location: Bookpurnong Terrace, Loxton, South Australia
- Country: Australia
- Denomination: Lutheran Church of Australia

History
- Founded: 1897
- Dedicated: 7 March 1926

Architecture
- Architect(s): Cowell & Cowell
- Style: Early English Gothic

Specifications
- Materials: Local limestone

St Peter's Lutheran Church, Loxton is a Lutheran congregation and church building located in Loxton, South Australia. It is part of the Lutheran Church of Australia and is recognised as a heritage-listed site. The church is notable for its Gothic-inspired design, constructed of local limestone, and for its central role in the life of the Riverland's Lutheran community.

== Location ==
The church is situated on Bookpurnong Terrace, overlooking the Murray River, in the Riverland town of Loxton.

== History ==
=== Beginnings ===
The Loxton Lutheran congregation was established in 1897, before the town itself was officially surveyed. Early worship took place in the homes of settlers such as John Drabsch (Loxton) and A. Stanitzki (Bookpurnong). Services were initially led every few months by Rev. L. Kuss from Mannum.

In 1904, the first dedicated church building was erected, a simple stone structure (40 ft × 20 ft × 14 ft), seating around 150 worshippers. This building, on land donated by J. H. F. Drabsch, remains today as the St Petri Hall. A manse was added in 1910, and the parish soon included surrounding districts such as Bookpurnong and Paringa.

=== Construction of the current church ===
By the early 1920s the congregation had grown to over 300 members, prompting the decision to build a larger church. Construction began in late 1924, and the foundation stone was laid on 18 January 1925 with the inscription: “To the Glory of God – 1 Cor 3:11”. The church was officially dedicated on 7 March 1926, with an estimated 2,000 people attending the ceremony.

The contractor was J. B. Traeger of Nuriootpa, and local limestone was quarried from the property of R. E. Thiele. The pews and pulpit were designed by Cowell & Cowell and crafted from blackwood and other local timbers.

== Architecture ==
The building was designed by the Adelaide architectural firm Cowell & Cowell, noted for their ecclesiastical designs. It is in the Early English Gothic style, built from locally sourced limestone. The interior includes a blackwood pulpit and pews, with timberwork also designed by the architects. The church's tower is a prominent Loxton landmark.

== Beliefs and worship ==
St Peter's is part of the Lutheran Church of Australia, with services emphasising the central Lutheran beliefs of salvation by grace through faith, the authority of Scripture, and the sacraments of Baptism and Holy Communion.

Regular worship includes an 8:30am traditional service and a 10:30am informal service each Sunday. On the first Sunday of the month, a combined 10:30am service is followed by a community lunch.

== Community and ministries ==
The church is active in community life, with various groups, hospitality events, and outreach programs. Facilities include Peace Hall and the St Petri Hall, used for social and ministry activities.

== Heritage status ==
St Peter's Lutheran Church and Hall on Bookpurnong Terrace are heritage-listed sites in Loxton, recognised for their architectural and historical significance.
