= Glossop High School =

Public high school in South Australia

Coordinates: 34°16′30″S 140°32′06″E

Information
- School type: High school
- Established: 1941; 85 years ago
- Years: 7-12

Berri Regional Secondary is a public high school in the Riverland of South Australia. The school was formed in 1941. There is one campus in Berri servicing Year 7 through 12.

The school was redeveloped in 1974. A new senior campus of the school was completed in 2008.
