= Swan Reach, South Australia =

Swan Reach
- Town
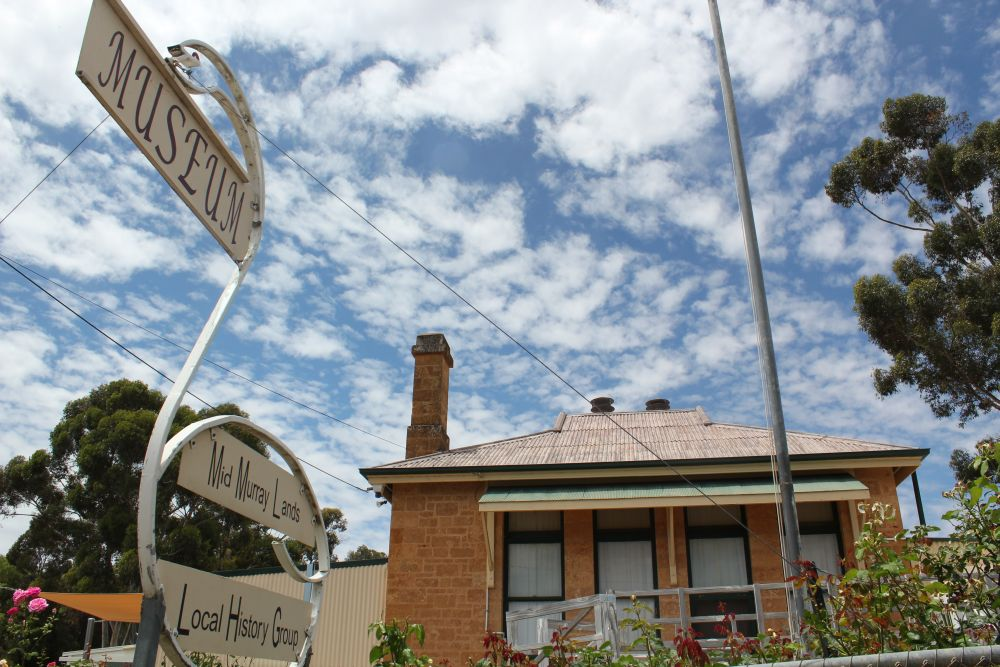
- The towns' museum (November 2011)

- Coordinates: 34°34′04″S 139°35′59″E
- Country: Australia
- State: South Australia
- LGA: Mid Murray Council

Government
  - State electorate: Chaffey
  - Federal division: Barker

Population
  - Total: 274 (UCL 2021)
- Time zone: UTC+9:30 (ACST)
  - Summer (DST): UTC+10:30 (ACDT)
- Postcode: 5354

Swan Reach is a river port in South Australia 127 km north-east of Adelaide on the Murray River between Blanchetown and Mannum in South Australia. It is on the left bank of the river. The Swan Reach Ferry is a cable ferry crossing operated by the state government as part of the state's road network. Swan Reach, with all parts below Lock #1, is also one of the lowest parts of the river. In 2009–2010 the river was about 1.5 metres below its normal level. In late 2022 and early 2023 the town experienced a flood with river levels not seen since the devastating flood of 1956. Homes and businesses on Victoria street were inundated, along with most of the holiday homes at Marks Landing. Widespread damage was caused. At the 2016 census, Swan Reach had a population of 283.

== History ==
Swan Reach was first settled in the 1850s and was originally the largest of five sheep and cattle stations in the area. It soon became one of the first riverboat ports in South Australia and was a loading port for grain and wool.

Swan Reach Mission was established by the United Aborigines Mission (UAM) in 1926 to provide a Christian education to Aboriginal children. It was closed in 1946 due to frequent flooding of the area, and the UAM opened the Gerard Mission near Loxton. Some residents were transferred to the new mission, but some, including the parents of singer-songwriter Ruby Hunter, moved elsewhere for work. Children of the mission became part of the Stolen Generation, later provided with some compensation through the National Redress Scheme.

== Around the town ==
Swan Reach has an area school, hotel and bottle shop, general store and post office, an op shop that opens Mondays to Fridays and Saturday mornings, and a fast food take-away shop near the ferry. The tourist boat Proud Mary and paddle-wheeler PS Murray Princess stop at the town once a week. There is a Lutheran church, with regular services, and a Lutheran pastor in residence. Anglican and Roman Catholic services are held monthly. Tourism, agriculture and irrigated horticulture are the main industries, and there is a large almond processing plant 1.5 km from town on the Stott Highway.

== River Murray International Dark Sky Reserve ==
The Swan Reach Conservation Park lies in a 3,200-square-kilometre (1,200 sq mi) area which was named the nation's first, and the world's 15th International Dark sky reserve in October 2019, by the International Dark-Sky Association. The "dark sky" title refers to areas where the night sky has a high darkness rating and there are policy controls to ensure light pollution is kept to a minimum, with reserve status only given when both public and private residential land is included.

Located in the heart of the Reserve Swan Reach is home to the Swan Reach Observatory. At the core of the observatory is a Planewave CDK700 telescope, a world-class research-grade telescope enabling advanced astronomical research under the pristine dark skies. Guided tours are available, giving visitors a chance to enjoy astronomy experiences normally reserved for major research facilities.

A multi-million-dollar joint project between Silentium Defence and the Western Sydney University to build a space domain awareness observatory to monitor satellites and other objects orbiting the Earth was announced in June 2020. The Murray Mallee location and terrain of the land was considered ideal for the purpose. The Oculus passive radar observatory opened in December 2021.

The reserve's official name is the River Murray International Dark Sky Reserve.

== See also ==
- List of crossings of the Murray River
