= Gluepot, South Australia =

Gluepot South Australia
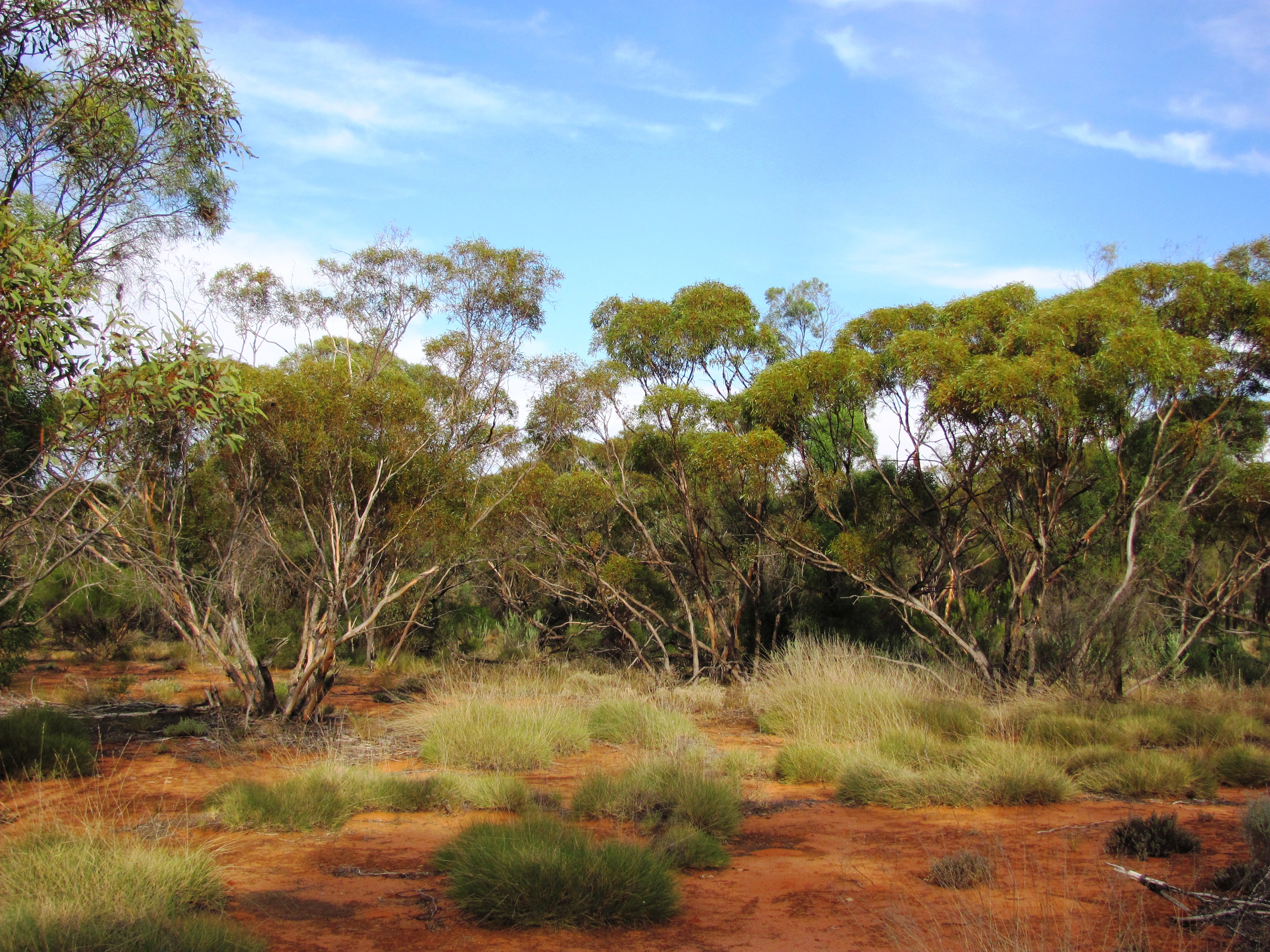
- Vegetation at Gluepot Reserve, South Australia

- Coordinates: 33°45′18″S 140°09′33″E
- Population: 3 (shared with other localities) (2016 census)
- Established: 2013; 12 years ago
- Postcode(s): 5417
- Elevation: 57 m (187 ft)
- Time zone: ACST (UTC+9:30)
  - Summer (DST): ACST (UTC+10:30)
- Location: 180 km (112 mi) north east of Adelaide; 40 km (25 mi) north of Waikerie
- LGA(s): Pastoral Unincorporated Area
- Region: Murray and Mallee
- County: Young
- State electorate(s): Stuart
- Federal division(s): Grey
Mean max temp	Mean min temp	Annual rainfall
25.3 °C; 78 °F	9.3 °C; 49 °F	281.5 mm 11.1 in
Suburbs around Gluepot:
Balah	Parcoola	Calperum Station
Balah	Gluepot	Calperum Station
Bunyung	Taylorville Station	Taylorville Station
- Footnotes: Adjoining localities

Gluepot is a locality in the Australian state of South Australia located about 180 kilometres (110 miles) north-east of the state capital of Adelaide and about 40 kilometres (25 miles) to the north of the town of Waikerie.

The locality was established on 26 April 2013 in respect to “the long established local name.” Its name is derived from the former pastoral lease of the same name.

The land use within Gluepot is concerned with the use of the former pastoral lease as a private protected area known as the Gluepot Reserve which has fully occupied its extent as of 1997.

The 2016 Australian census which was conducted in August 2016 reports that Gluepot shared a population of three people with adjoining localities.

Gluepot is located within the federal Division of Grey, the state electoral district of Stuart, the Pastoral Unincorporated Area of South Australia and the state’s Murray and Mallee region.

== Weather station ==
Gluepot has been the site of an official weather station since 1999.

Climate data for Gluepot, South Australia
Month	Jan	Feb	Mar	Apr	May	Jun	Jul	Aug	Sep	Oct	Nov	Dec	Year
Mean daily maximum °C (°F)	34.1 (93.4)	32.8 (91.0)	29.5 (85.1)	25.1 (77.2)	20.6 (69.1)	17.1 (62.8)	17.1 (62.8)	18.9 (66.0)	22.6 (72.7)	25.9 (78.6)	29.2 (84.6)	31.5 (88.7)	25.4 (77.7)
Mean daily minimum °C (°F)	16.0 (60.8)	15.4 (59.7)	12.4 (54.3)	8.6 (47.5)	6.2 (43.2)	4.0 (39.2)	3.7 (38.7)	4.3 (39.7)	6.5 (43.7)	8.8 (47.8)	12.0 (53.6)	13.8 (56.8)	9.3 (48.7)
Average rainfall mm (inches)	18.7 (0.74)	22.5 (0.89)	13.0 (0.51)	19.5 (0.77)	19.1 (0.75)	23.8 (0.94)	19.4 (0.76)	19.3 (0.76)	23.1 (0.91)	20.7 (0.81)	29.3 (1.15)	34.9 (1.37)	272.5 (10.73)
Average rainy days	2.5	1.9	1.6	2.8	4.7	4.0	4.4	5.0	3.4	3.5	3.9	3.7	41.4

== See also ==
- List of cities and towns in South Australia
- Riverland Biosphere Reserve
