= Berri Barmera Council =

Coordinates: 34°17′00″S 140°36′00″E

- Local government area
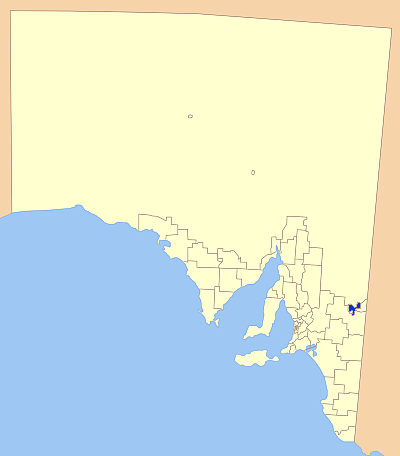
- Location of the Berri Barmera Council in SA

- Interactive map of Berri Barmera Council
- Country: Australia
- State: South Australia
- Region: Murray and Mallee
- Established: 1996
- Council seat: Berri

Government
  - Mayor: Ella Winnall
  - State electorate: Chaffey
  - Federal division: Barker

Area
  - Total: 508 km^{2} (196 sq mi)

Population
  - Total: 10,484 (LGA 2021)
  - Density: 20.64/km^{2} (53.5/sq mi)
- Website: Berri Barmera Council
LGAs around Berri Barmera Council
unincorporated area	unincorporated area	unincorporated area
Loxton Waikerie	Berri Barmera Council	Renmark Paringa
Gerard	Loxton Waikerie	Loxton Waikerie

Berri Barmera Council is a local government area in the Riverland region of South Australia.

It includes the towns of Barmera, Berri, Cobdogla, Glossop, Katarapko, Loveday and Winkie, and parts of Monash and Overland Corner.

== History ==
The Berri Barmera Council was created on 1 October 1996 with the amalgamation of the District Council of Barmera and the District Council of Berri.

The District Council of Berri had been created in 1922, 11 years after the town was proclaimed. Its first major project was to provide reliable electricity to the entire area. It bought the Berri Electric Supply Company in 1936 to facilitate this, and later sold it to the Electricity Trust of South Australia, a state government agency.

The District Council of Barmera had been created as the "District Council of Cobdogla" on 17 June 1925 and been renamed Barmera in 1937. Barmera had been a soldier settlement community after World War I.

== Council ==
The Berri Barmera Council has a directly-elected mayor.

=== 2022 election results ===
2022 South Australian local elections: Berri Barmera
Party	Candidate	Votes	%	±%
Independent	Rhonda Centofanti (elected)	1,006	32.0	
Independent	Bruce Richardson (elected)	496	15.8	
Independent	Trevor Scott (elected)	354	11.3	
Independent	Collis Marrett (elected)	243	7.7	
Independent	Andrew Kassebaum (elected)	224	7.1	
Independent	David Waterman (elected)	220	7.0	
Independent	Adrian Little (elected)	215	6.8	
Independent	Ian Schlein (elected)	206	6.6	
Independent	Meta Sindos	178	5.7	
Total formal votes		3,142	96.9	
Informal votes		102	3.1	
Turnout		3,244	42.9	
