= Spectacle Lake (Minnesota) =

Lake in the state of Minnesota, United States

- Location within Minnesota
- Location: Isanti County, Minnesota
- Coordinates: 45°34.5′N 93°24.5′W
- Type: lake

Spectacle Lake is a lake in Isanti County, in the U.S. state of Minnesota. It was so named on account of its outline being shaped like a pair of spectacles.

Spectacle Lake Wildlife Management Area is next to the lake, midway between the cities of Princeton and Cambridge, Minnesota.

== See also ==
- List of lakes in Minnesota
