= Winkie, South Australia =

Winkie
- Town
- Coordinates: 34°18′27″S 140°31′11″E
- Country: Australia
- State: South Australia
- LGA: Berri Barmera Council
- Location: 188 km (117 mi) NE of Adelaide; 8 km (5.0 mi) SE of Barmera
- Established: 20 August 1953 (town); 3 December 1998 (locality)
- Abolished: 27 January 1972 (town)

Government
  - State electorate: Chaffey
  - Federal division: Barker

Population
  - Total: 336 (SAL 2021)
- Time zone: UTC+9:30 (ACST)
  - Summer (DST): UTC+10:30 (ACDT)
- Postcode: 5343
Localities around Winkie
Barmera; Loveday	Glossop	Gurra Gurra
Spectacle Lake; Gerard	Winkie	Gurra Gurra; Bookpurnong
Gerard	Katarapko	Bookpurnong
- Location; Adjoining localities

Winkie is a locality in South Australia, around 11 km southwest of the Riverland town of Berri, and around the same distance southeast of Barmera. It is close to the Murray River, which passes through Berri.

Originally part of Cobdogla Station, marked on early maps as Wink Wink Paddock. The name may mean "river flats". The area was surveyed and channelled during 1911–13 as part of the Berri Irrigation Area. Being extended for soldier settlement after World War 1. In the 1950s there were plans to establish a residential township area, which did not eventuate.
