= County of Young =

Young
- Cadastral division
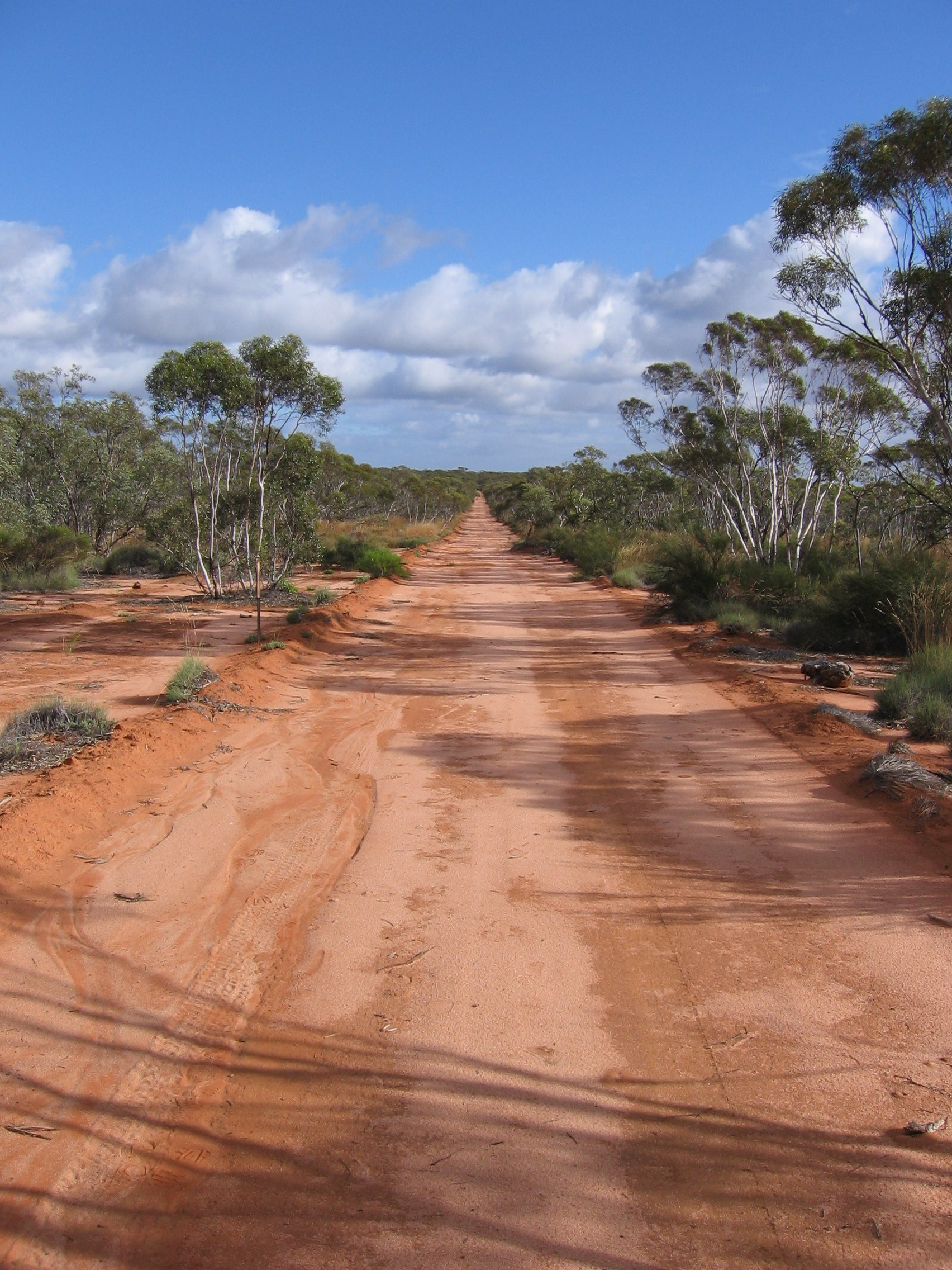
- Road in Gluepot Reserve, Gluepot, South Australia

- Coordinates: 33°45′41″S 140°02′05″E
- Country: Australia
- State: South Australia
- Region: Murray and Mallee
- LGA(s): Mid Murray Council District Council of Loxton Waikerie Pastoral Unincorporated Area
- Established: 19 April 1860

Area
  - Total: 5,450 km^{2} (2,106 sq mi)
Lands administrative divisions around Young
Kimberley
Burra	Young	Hamley
Eyre	Albert	Alfred

County of Young is a cadastral unit located in the Australian state of South Australia covers land located in the state’s east on the north side of the Murray River. It was proclaimed in 1860 by Governor MacDonnell and named after his predecessor, Governor Young. It has been partially divided in the following sub-units of hundreds – Markaranka, Parcoola, Pooginook and Stuart.

== Description ==
The County of Young covers part of South Australia to the north of the Murray River. The county is bounded as follows - the centre of the Murray River channel to the south, the western boundary of the County of Hamley to the east, the extension of the northern boundary of the County of Burra to the north having a length of 63 kilometres (39 mi) and the boundary with the County of Burra to the west.

== History ==
The County of Young was proclaimed by Richard Graves MacDonnell, the sixth Governor of South Australia on 19 April 1860. The county was named after Henry Edward Fox Young who was the fifth Governor of South Australia from 2 August 1848 to 20 December 1854. The following four hundreds were proclaimed within the County between the years 1860 and 1915 - Markaranka, Parcoola and Pooginook in 1915, and Stuart in 1860.

== Constituent hundreds ==
=== Location of constituent hundreds ===
The constituent hundreds are located along the southern boundary of the county in the following order (from west to east) - Stuart, Markaranka, Pooginook and Parcoola.

=== Hundred of Markaranka ===
The Hundred of Markaranka (34°02′08″S 139°57′42″E) was proclaimed by Governor Galway on 7 October 1915. It covers an area of 260 square kilometres (102 sq mi) and its name is reported as being derived from the Aboriginal word "markarauko".

=== Hundred of Parcoola ===
The Hundred of Parcoola (34°05′39″S 140°17′25″E) was proclaimed by Governor Galway on 7 October 1915. It covers an area of 219.5 square kilometres (84.75 sq mi) and it is reported as being derived from an aboriginal word meaning "three".

=== Hundred of Pooginook ===
The Hundred of Pooginook (34°03′37″S 140°08′01″E) was proclaimed by Governor Galway on 7 October 1915. It covers an area of 380 square kilometres (146 sq mi) and its name is reported as being of aboriginal origin.

=== Hundred of Stuart ===
The Hundred of Stuart (33°57′19″S 139°46′30″E) was proclaimed on 19 April 1860. It covers an area of 260 square kilometres (102 sq mi) which was formerly part of the now-annulled Hundred of the Murray and was named by Governor MacDonnell after the explorer, John McDouall Stuart.

== See also ==
- Lands administrative divisions of South Australia
