= Monash, South Australia =

Monash
- Town
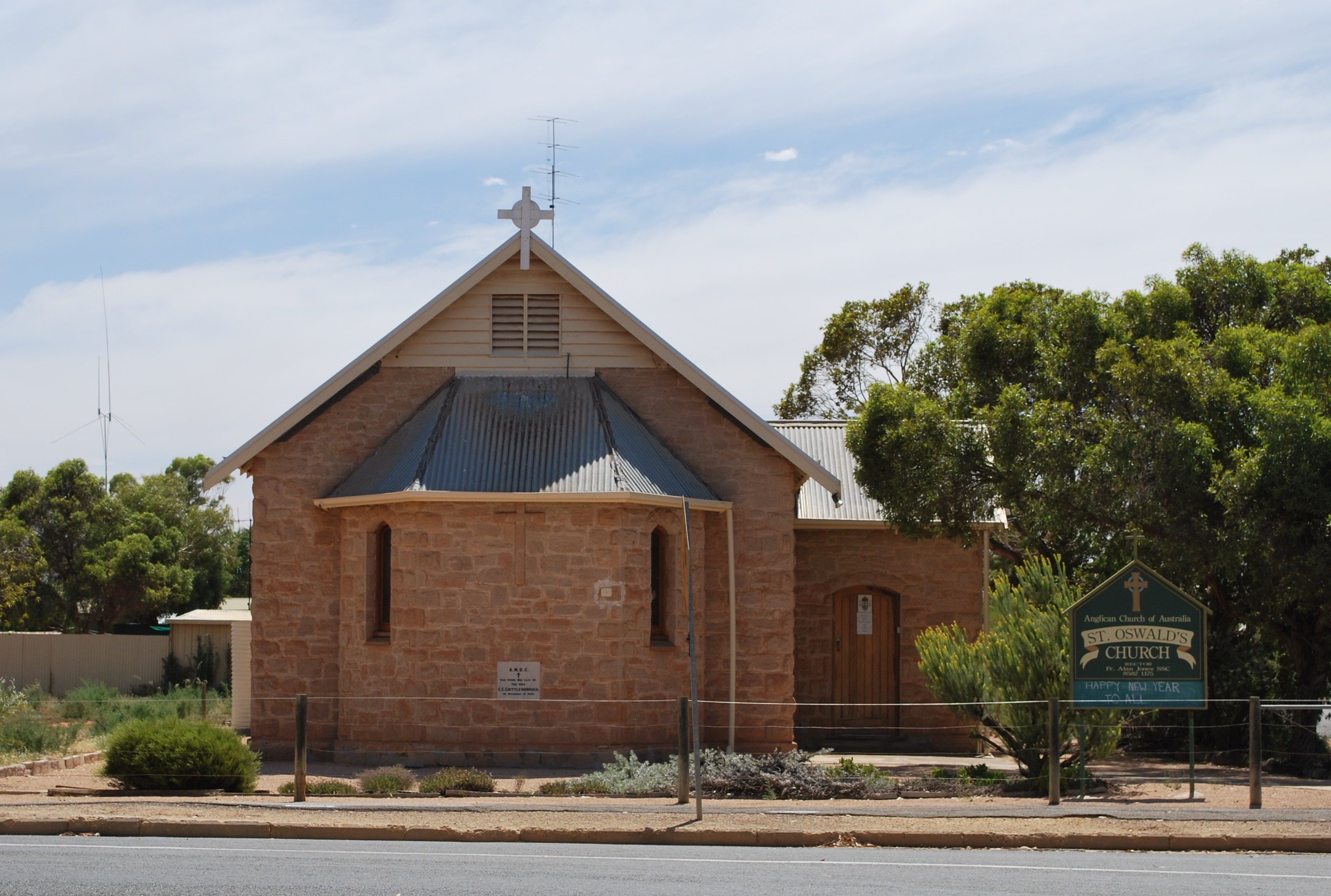
- St Oswald's Anglican church

- Coordinates: 34°14′S 140°33′E
- Country: Australia
- State: South Australia
- LGA: Berri Barmera Council
- Location: 10 km (6.2 mi) E of Barmera
- Established: 25 August 1921 (town); 3 December 1998 (locality)

Government
  - State electorate: Chaffey
  - Federal division: Barker

Population
  - Total: 1,110 (SAL 2021)
- Time zone: UTC+9:30 (ACST)
  - Summer (DST): UTC+10:30 (ACDT)
- Postcode: 5342

Monash, known as Lone Gum to the early settlers, is a town in the Riverland area of South Australia. It is on the Sturt Highway between Barmera and Renmark. It is particularly known for its adventure playground, in existence since the 1970s and now known as Monash Adventure Park.

== History ==
Aboriginal people were settled in the Riverland area long before the colonisation of South Australia, with the Erawirung people being the traditional owners.

The part of the settlement which became Monash was named Lone Gum, after a prominent local landmark, a river red gum tree (Eucalyptus camaldulensis), by the first European settlers there, who were soldiers, in 1916. After the end of World War I, land was allocated to repatriated soldiers, as part of the state government Soldier Settler Scheme.

Monash was proclaimed in August 1921 and is named after General Sir John Monash, a World War I army commander. It continued to be referred to as Lone Gum until at least 1926, when the ANZACs were commemorated there.

The tree's image is used on the Monash Primary School emblem.

== Governance and demographics ==
Monash is in the Berri Barmera Council, state electoral district of Chaffey, and federal Division of Barker. Its postcode is 5342.

In the 2021 Australian census, the population of Monash was 1,110, with a median age of 47. The predominant ancestries were English and Australian, with German coming in third at 14%.

== Economy ==
The primary industry is irrigated horticulture, in particular stone fruits, and viticulture.

== Attractions ==
=== Gurra Gurra ===
The Gurra Gurra wetlands, part of the Murray River National Park, cover around 3,000 ha (7,400 acres) on the eastern bank of the Murray, with its lakes bordering the Sturt Highway near Monash. Bird life is prolific across the drowned floodplain, including pelicans, black swans, darters, and ducks.

=== Monash Adventure Park ===
Monash is best known in South Australia as the home of a major adventure playground for adults as well as children, with tall, fast and twisty slippery dips (slides) and other equipment.

The park was designed by local engineer and businessman Grant Telfer, after he had been asked by the Monash Progress Association in the 1960s to make a small playground slide and swing for the town. The playground was named Grant Park. In the 1970s Telfer began creating new equipment, including a carousel and a spiral slide around a tall tower, based on a "lighthouse-type" of slide that he had seen at the Adelaide beachside suburb of Semaphore as a child. He then designed and constructed various types of see-saws (totalling 33 in the end); ll types of slides, swinging ropes, a roller coaster, flying foxes (ziplines); and a number of rotary cones, all out of steel. Eventually 180 pieces of equipment covered 2 ha (4.9 acres), which was free to use for any visitors in the 1980s, with no restrictions. Around 300,000 adults and children visited Monash Playground each year during this times.

In 1992, Telfer decided that the playground had to be closed, owing to prohibitive public liability insurance costs. It was redeveloped and reopened by Berri Barmera Council in November 1996 as Monash Adventure Park, with scaled-down versions of the equipment.

==== Original playground (1983) ====
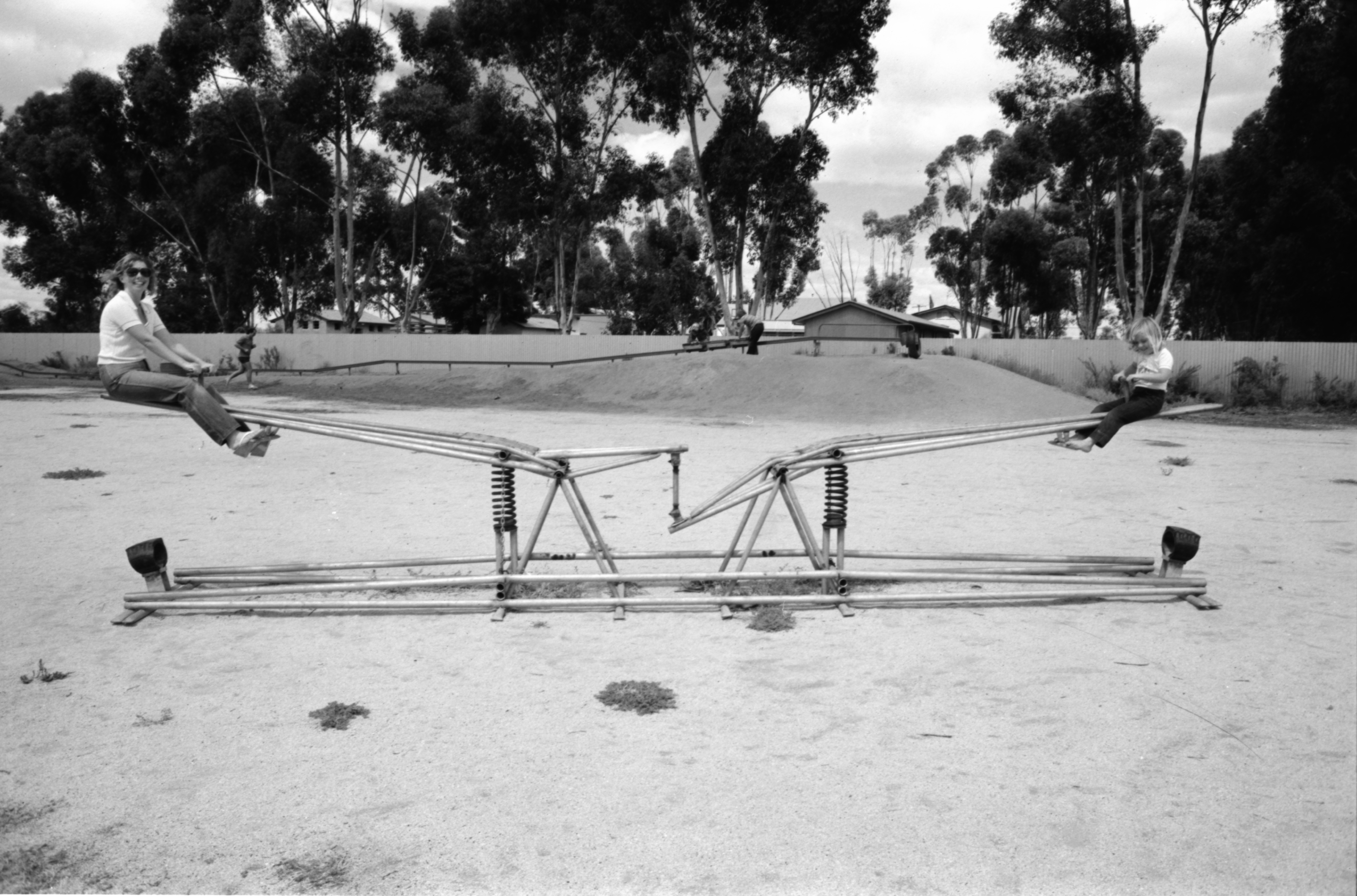

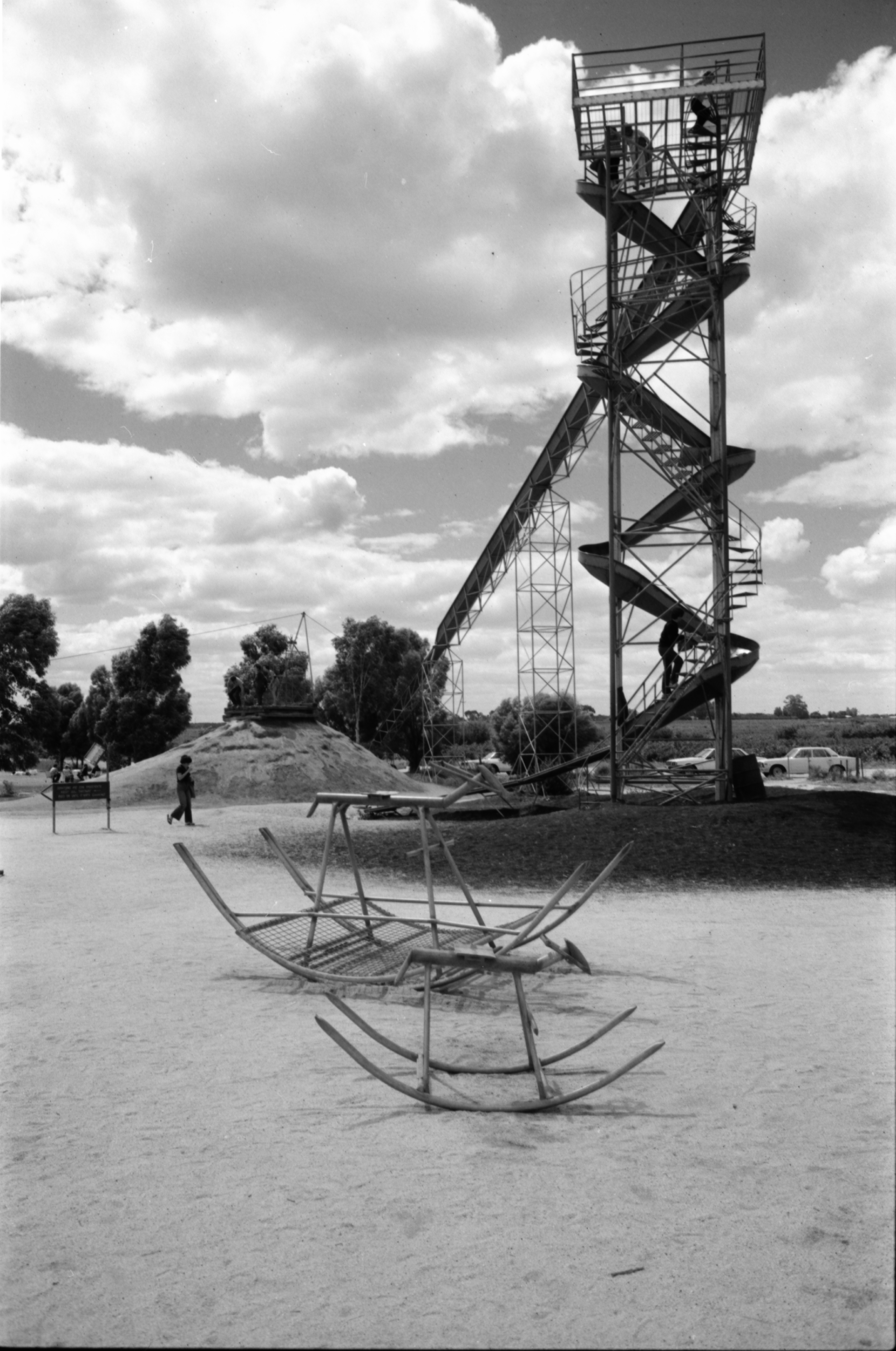

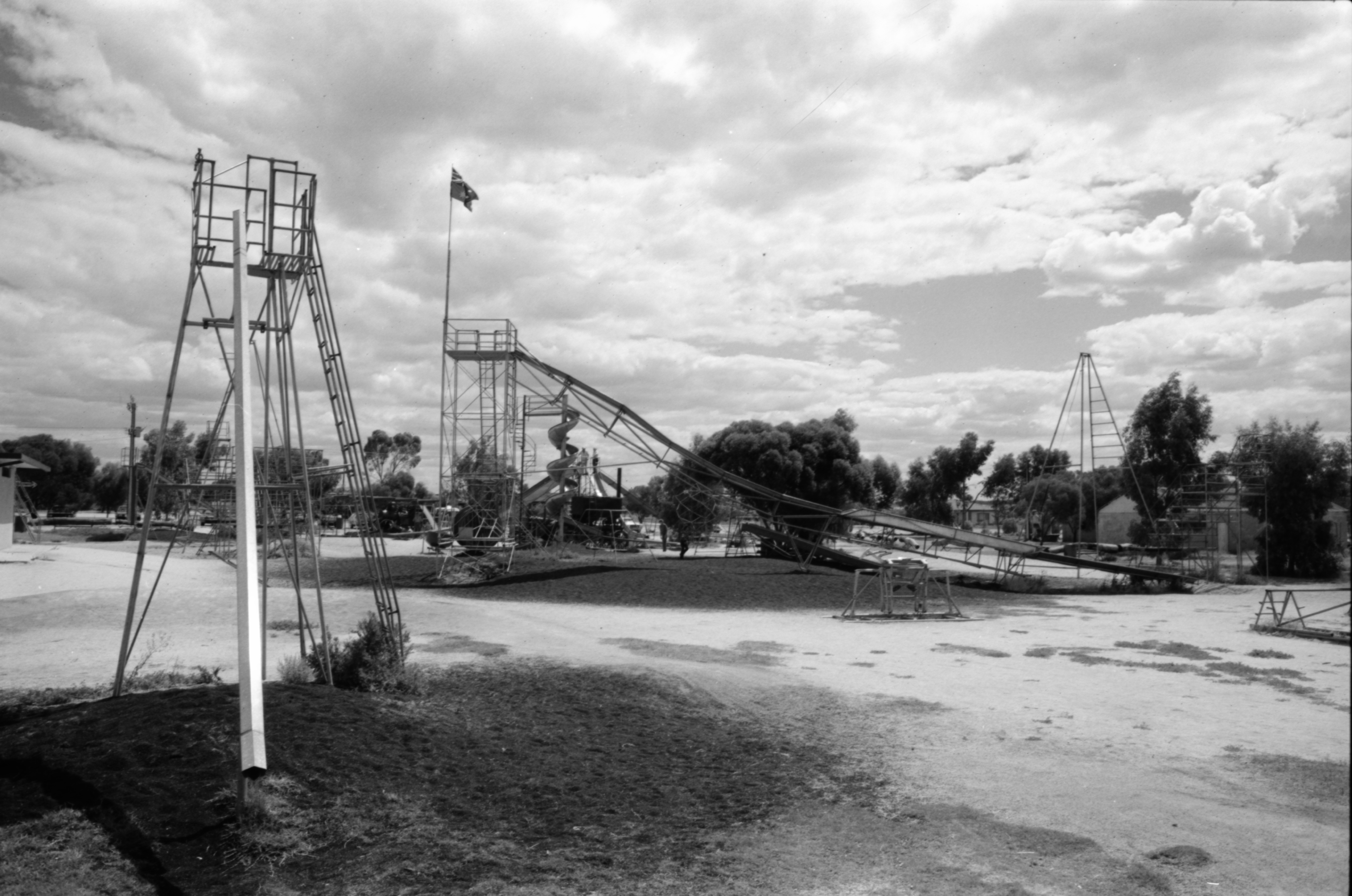

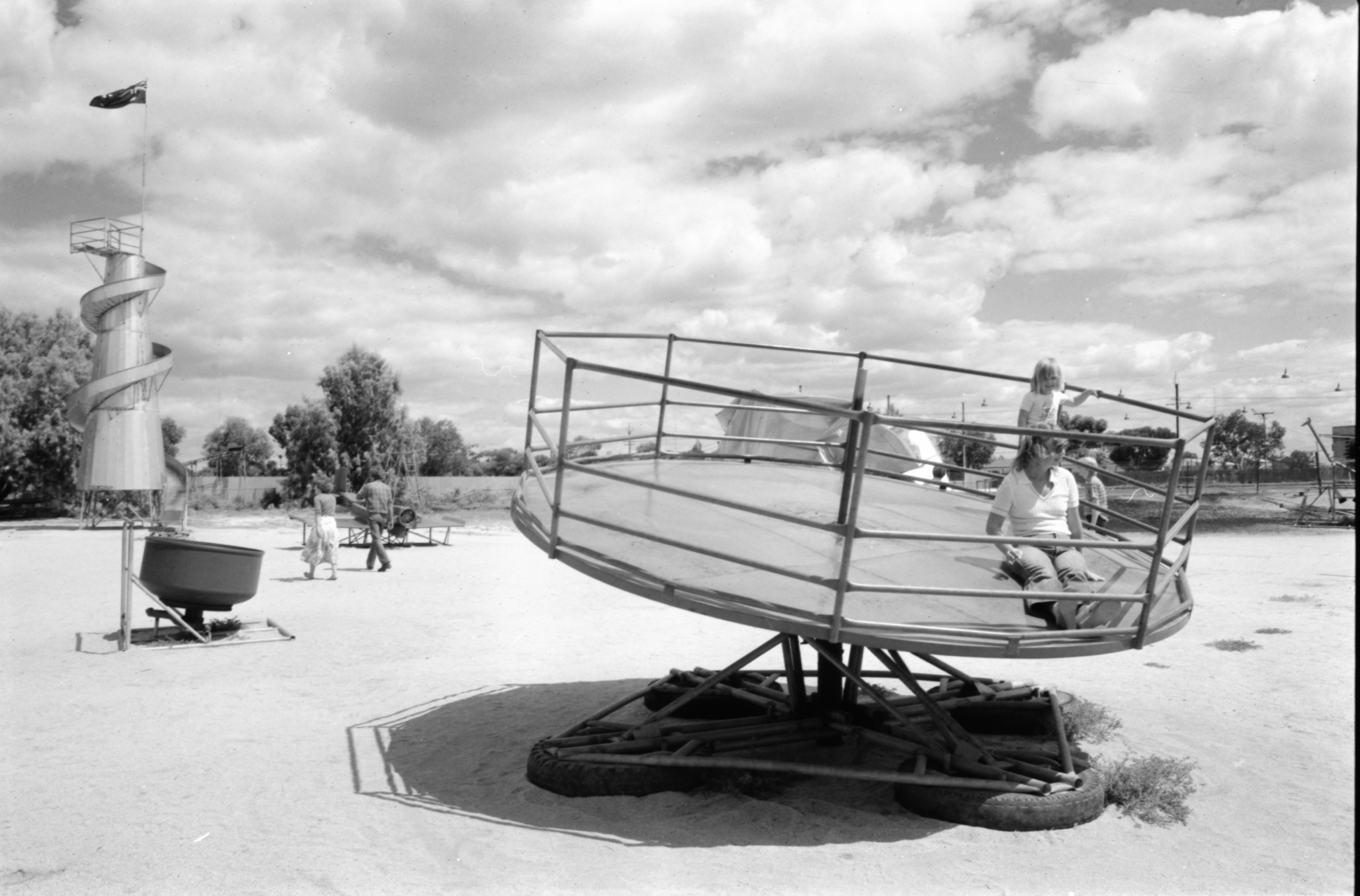

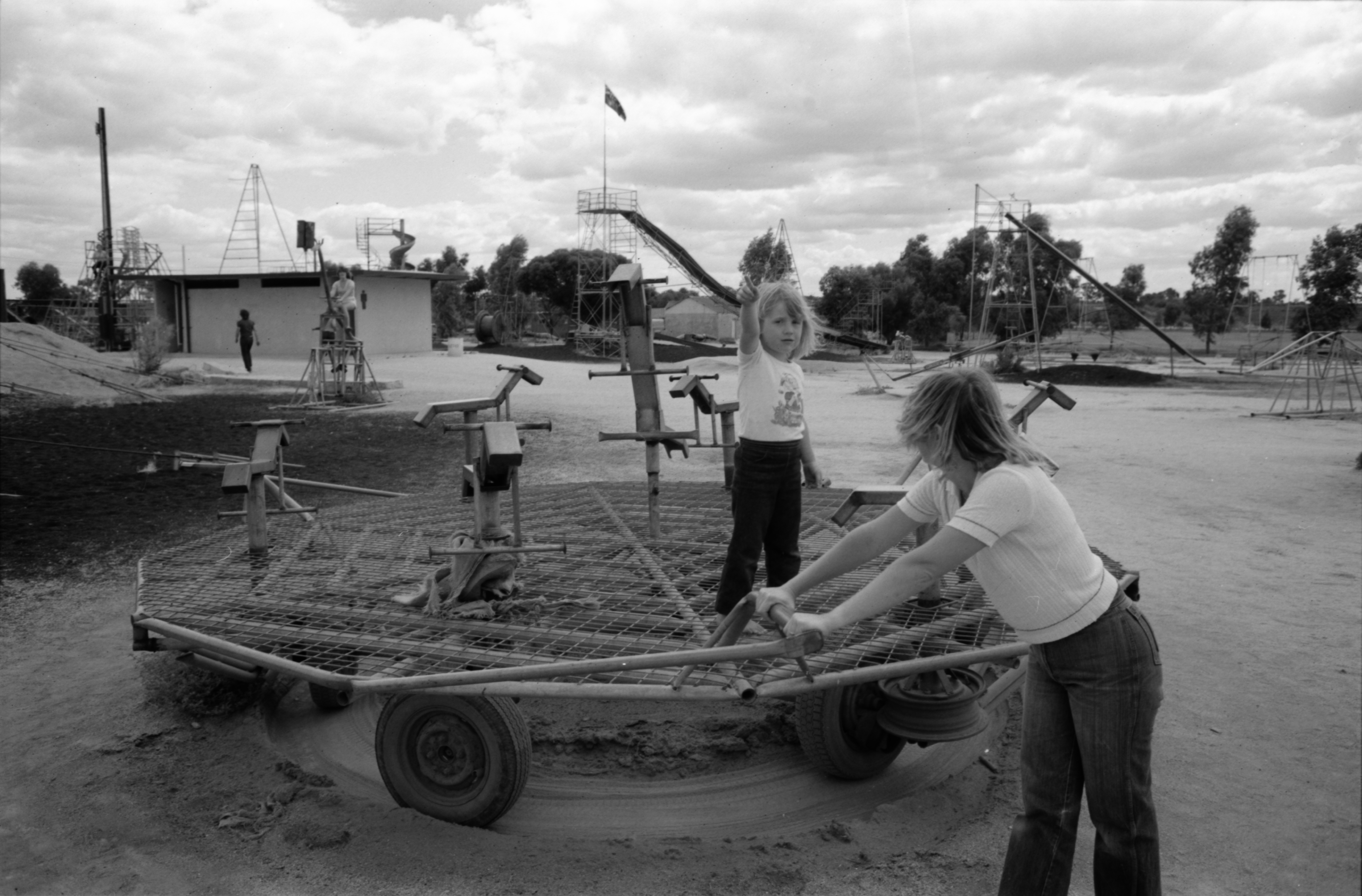

==== After rebuilding ====
Maze and lake, 2005

2005

2008

Telfer also designed and created the original "Gopher" brand of three- and four-wheeled mobility scooter, around 1980, as well as hand-propelled tricycles for use by disabled children. He also built an ocean-going catamaran, later launched at Morgan to motor down the River Murray, and he and his wife Margaret sailed around parts of Australia and the Pacific in it.

Telfer died in 2021, aged 89. A statue of Telfer was unveiled at the Adventure Park on 23 August 2026 by his daughter Alison Halupka and Berri mayor Ella Winnall.

== See also ==
- List of parks and gardens in rural South Australia
