= County of Hamley =

Hamley
- Cadastral division
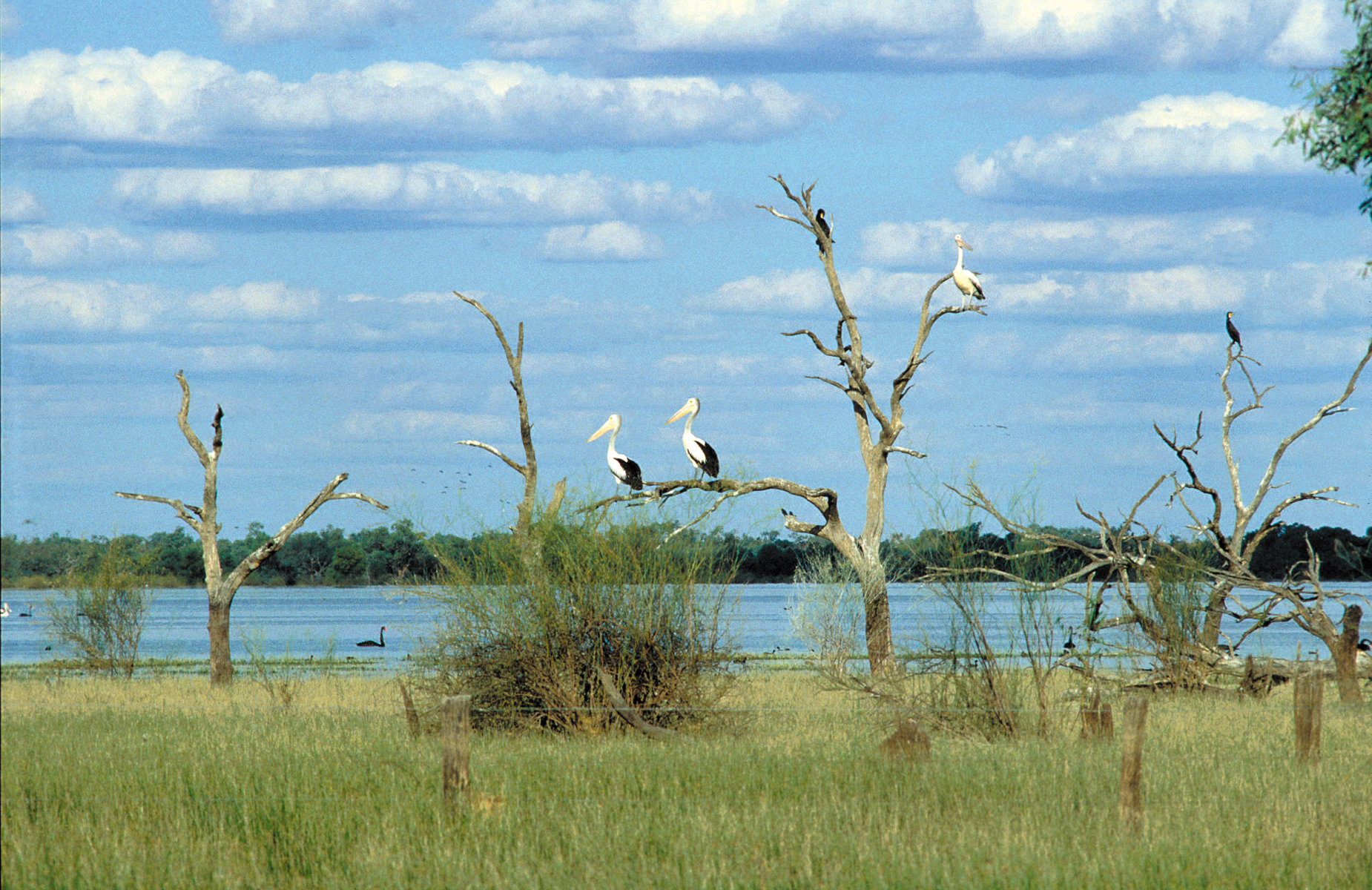
- Pelicans, black swans, cormorants and other water birds at Coombool Swamp, Chowilla

- Coordinates: 33.789°S 140.697°E
- Country: Australia
- State: South Australia
- Region: Murray and Mallee
- LGA(s): Berri Barmera Council Renmark Paringa Council Unincorporated area
- Established: 1869

Area
  - Total: 5,790 km^{2} (2,236 sq mi)
Lands administrative divisions around Hamley
		Windeyer (NSW)
Young	Hamley	Tara (NSW)
Albert	Alfred	Millewa (Vic)
- Coordinates; Adjoining counties

The County of Hamley is a cadastral unit (i.e., a comprehensively surveyed and mapped division of land) located in the Australian state of South Australia covers land located in the state's east north of the Murray River, bordering New South Wales and Victoria. It was proclaimed in 1869 by Governor Fergusson and named after Francis Hamley.

== Description ==
The county covers the part of South Australia to the north of the Murray River and adjoining the borders with the states of New South Wales and Victoria. The county is bounded as follows - the centre of the Murray River channel to the south, the eastern boundary of the County of Young to the west, the extension of the northern boundary of the County of Young to the north and the borders with the above-mentioned states to the east.

== History ==
The county was proclaimed by Sir James Fergusson, 6th Baronet, the eighth Governor of South Australia on 18 February 1869. The county was named after Lieutenant Colonel Francis Gilbert Hamley who was the Administrator of South Australia from 20 February 1868 to 15 February 1869. The following two hundreds have been proclaimed within the County - Katarapko in 1922 and Loveday in 1923.

== Constituent hundreds ==
=== Location of constituent hundreds ===
The Hundreds of Katarapko and Loveday are located next to each other at the southernmost end of the county and cover land within the area within the loop of the river between Cobdogla in the west, Barmera in the north, Loxton in the south and Berri in the east.

=== Hundred of Katarapko ===
The Hundred of Katarapko (34°22′43″S 140°31′10″E) was proclaimed on 6 April 1922. It covers an area of 160 square kilometres (61 sq mi) and its name is reported as being derived from Katarapko Creek which is located within the boundaries of the hundred.

=== Hundred of Loveday ===
The Hundred of Loveday (34°17′31″S 140°25′51″E) was proclaimed on 24 May 1923. It covers an area of 73 square kilometres (28 sq mi) and it is named after Ernest Alfred Loveday who was the "first Superintending Surveyor" for the state’s "Irrigation Department."

== See also ==
- Lands administrative divisions of South Australia
