= Loxton, South Australia =

Loxton
- Town
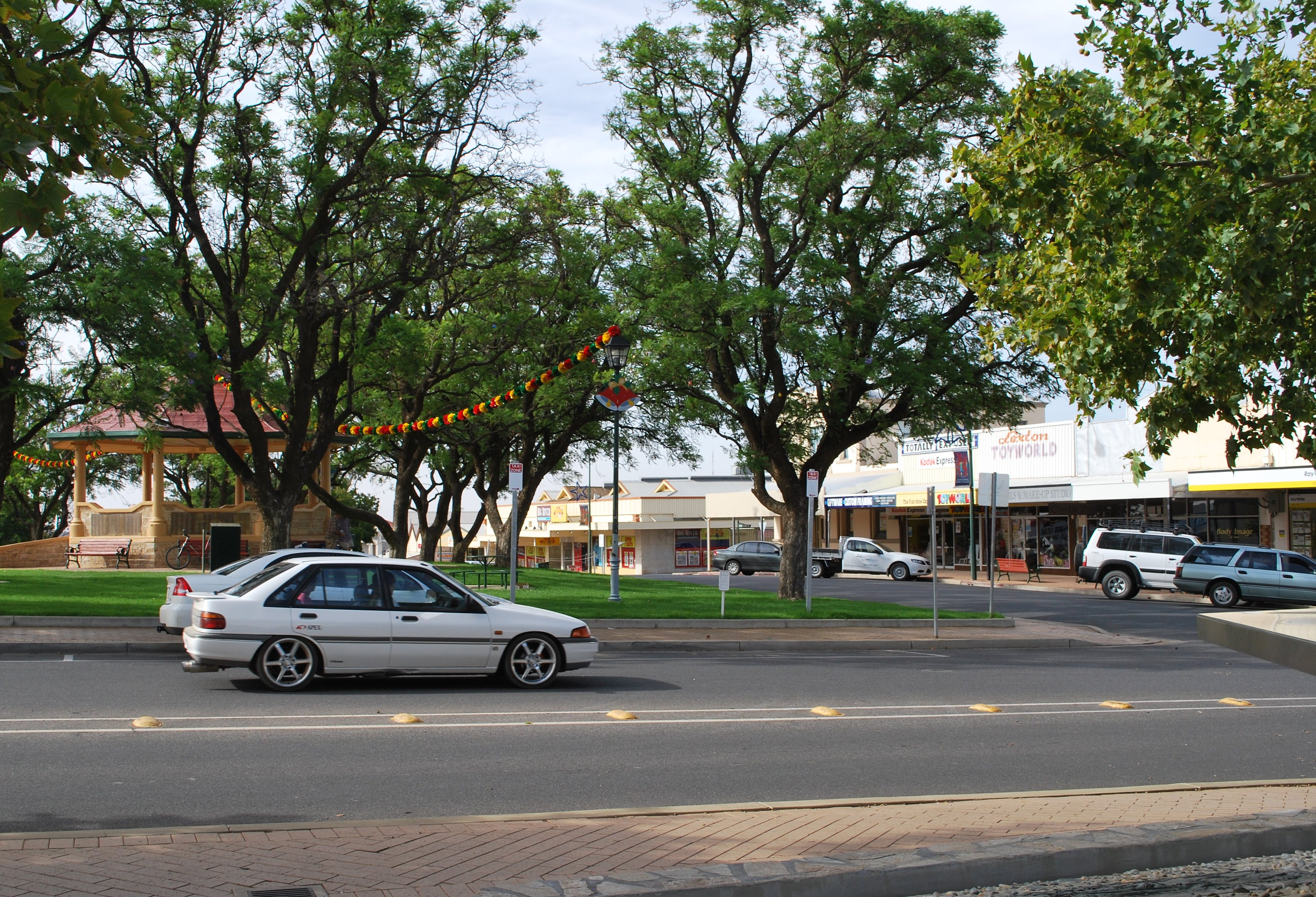
- Main street

- Coordinates: 34°27′14″S 140°34′01″E
- Country: Australia
- State: South Australia
- LGA: District Council of Loxton Waikerie
- Location: 246 km (153 mi) E of Adelaide; 41 km (25 mi) S of Renmark; 680 km (420 mi) NW of Melbourne

Government
  - State electorate: Chaffey
  - Federal division: Barker

Population
  - Total: 3,947 (UCL 2021)
  - Density: 532/km^{2} (1,380/sq mi)
- Time zone: UTC+9:30 (ACST)
  - Summer (DST): UTC+10:30 (ACST)
- Postcode: 5333
- County: Alfred
- Mean max temp: 24.0 °C (75.2 °F)
- Mean min temp: 9.1 °C (48.4 °F)
- Annual rainfall: 259.8 mm (10.23 in)
Localities around Loxton
	Katarapko	Loxton North
Pyap	Loxton	Bugle Hut
Pyap West	Pata	Woodleigh

Loxton is a town on the south bank of the River Murray in the Riverland region of South Australia. It is located on the lands of the Erawirung people who occupied the area before the arrival of Europeans.

It is a service town for the surrounding districts. Loxton's primary productions are agriculture and horticulture. Citrus fruit, wine grapes, almonds, and stone fruit trees are prevalent. Loxton is also the main town for the northern part of the Murray Mallee which is a dryland farming and grain cropping area. Loxton High School provides secondary education for the area.

Loxton has a pioneer settlement museum (known as the Loxton Historical Village), preserving the heritage of the mallee region. It is also famous for the "Loxton Lights Up" Christmas Festival in December each year, and the annual 120m Loxton Gift handicap sprint race held in late February. The town hosts the second round of the Australian HPV Super Series in May annually.

Loxton is the seat of the local government area of the District Council of Loxton Waikerie. It is in the South Australian House of Assembly electoral district of Chaffey and the Australian House of Representatives division of Barker.

The town is home to a variety of service clubs, most notably the Apex Club, Rotary Club, and Lions Club.

== Media ==
Historically, Loxton has been home to several newspapers. These include:

- Loxton Clarion (and Murray lands Advocate) (2 July 1925–2 October 1928) - The Loxton Clarion's proprietor, Jack Irving, endeavoured to produce a publication reflecting the concerns of Loxton and surrounding districts. Its articles covered crops, care of livestock, vehicle maintenance, and local sport. From 23 July 1925, it was known as The Loxton Clarion and Murray Lands Guardian. In late 1928, it was absorbed into The Murray Pioneer and Australian River Record.
- Loxton Community Newsletter (June 1956–March 1960) - A monthly newspaper, published by The Loxton District War Memorial Community Centre, and incorporated into the Loxton News in 1960.
- Loxton News (28 April 1960 – 2020) - Irving came out of retirement to found a new newspaper. In 1964 it (like Irving's Clarion) was sold to the Murray Pioneer. The newspaper has gone on to win many Country Press SA awards.

Channels from the following television networks are available in Loxton:

- ABC Television (ABC)
- SBS Television (SBS)
- WIN Television (7, 9 and 10) as RTS-5A and LRS-34 relays the programming from Seven Network (Seven SA), Nine Network (Nine SA) and Network Ten (10 SA), Sky News Regional and Fox Sports News. SDS/RDS and MGS/LRS inserts local commercials, while SES/RTS takes a direct feed of SAS-7 Adelaide since 30 June 2024.

== Transport ==
The first form of regular transport to Loxton was paddle steamers on the Murray River. The Loxton railway line, completed in 1914, connected Alawoona and Tailem Bend to Adelaide. Loxton today is connected by road to the Sturt Highway, which passes nearby at Kingston On Murray and is the northern terminus of the Karoonda Highway and eastern terminus of the Stott Highway. The railway line now terminates at the Tookayerta grain terminal 7 kilometres (4 miles) south of the town and does not carry any passengers. The line was closed in 2015.

== Salt interception scheme ==
Loxton is a town with many farms and fruit crops. The joint programme of salt interception schemes to help keep salt out of the River Murray, costing an estimated $60 million, commenced in 2001. This programme was expected to deliver 61 EC at Morgan by December 2007. The partner Governments of New South Wales, Victoria and South Australia and the Commonwealth have agreed that joint salt interception schemes must be both economically and technically feasible.

== Loxton Gift ==
The Loxton Gift athletics carnival offers the most prize money in South Australia apart from the Bay Sheffield held at Glenelg. The program includes races from 70m to 1000m and is the final major South Australian lead-up event to the Stawell Gift held at Easter.

== Loxton Pedal Prix ==
Since 2014, the streets of the town had been shut off in May for the running of the Loxton Pedal Prix, which is a round of the Australian HPV Super Series. The track incorporates the major central roundabout and the surrounding main streets. It includes two long 600m straights, one uphill and one downhill. The event proved popular with locals, riders and spectators alike, and was a mainstay on the Australian HPV Super Series calendar. In 2018 and 2019 it was round 2 of the series.

After many years of the event running successfully in the town, Covid-19 saw the event paused, then cancelled as it failed to get support from the organisers in 2022 after the hiatus due to Covid 19 management issues. The Bend took its round 2 spot in 2022, with Mallalla also being considered. The event has not been held in the town since.

== Heritage listings ==
Loxton has a number of heritage-listed sites, including:

- Bookpurnong Terrace: St Peter's Evangelical Lutheran Church and Hall
- 29 East Terrace: Loxton Institute
- 6 Pflaum Terrace: Loxton Villa

== Notable persons born in Loxton ==
- Zachery Schubert (b. 1995) Australian beach volleyball player
- Alex Carey (b. 1991), Australian test cricketer
- Emily Beaton (b. 1987), Australian netballer.
- Sophie Edington (b. 1984), Australian swimmer
- Grantley Fielke (b. 1962), former Australian rules footballer, and winner of the 1985 Magarey Medal.
- Major General Cheryl Pearce AM, CSC, Deputy Chief of Army (2023–)
- Grant Schubert (b. 1980), Australian field hockey gold medallist.
- Tim Storer (b. 1969), Australian independent senator 2018–2019

== Climate ==
Loxton has a cool semi-arid climate (Köppen: BSk), with very warm summers, mild winters and low annual precipitation. Average maxima range from 32.2 °C (90.0 °F) in January to 16.0 °C (60.8 °F) in July. Average annual rainfall is 266.1 mm (10.48 in), with a slight winter maximum, although it has varied from just 121.0 millimetres or 4.76 inches in 2002 up to 486.9 millimetres or 19.17 inches in 2022. Annually, there are 108.2 clear days and 120.1 cloudy days. Extreme temperatures have ranged from −5.7 °C (21.7 °F) on 21 July 1982 to 47.3 °C (117.1 °F) on 20 December 2019.

Climate data for Loxton, elevation 30 m (98 ft), (1991–2020 normals, extremes 1964–present)
Month	Jan	Feb	Mar	Apr	May	Jun	Jul	Aug	Sep	Oct	Nov	Dec	Year
Record high °C (°F)	46.6 (115.9)	47.1 (116.8)	42.3 (108.1)	39.4 (102.9)	30.2 (86.4)	25.7 (78.3)	28.5 (83.3)	31.2 (88.2)	36.2 (97.2)	40.1 (104.2)	43.6 (110.5)	47.3 (117.1)	47.3 (117.1)
Mean daily maximum °C (°F)	32.4 (90.3)	31.7 (89.1)	28.3 (82.9)	24.0 (75.2)	19.6 (67.3)	16.4 (61.5)	16.1 (61.0)	17.8 (64.0)	21.1 (70.0)	24.7 (76.5)	27.9 (82.2)	30.2 (86.4)	24.2 (75.6)
Mean daily minimum °C (°F)	15.1 (59.2)	14.9 (58.8)	12.2 (54.0)	8.6 (47.5)	6.3 (43.3)	4.7 (40.5)	3.9 (39.0)	4.3 (39.7)	6.5 (43.7)	8.6 (47.5)	11.3 (52.3)	13.3 (55.9)	9.1 (48.4)
Record low °C (°F)	4.8 (40.6)	6.1 (43.0)	2.9 (37.2)	−1.3 (29.7)	−4.1 (24.6)	−5.4 (22.3)	−5.7 (21.7)	−4.6 (23.7)	−3.2 (26.2)	−0.1 (31.8)	2.7 (36.9)	4.4 (39.9)	−5.7 (21.7)
Average rainfall mm (inches)	20.2 (0.80)	20.0 (0.79)	11.1 (0.44)	20.0 (0.79)	21.4 (0.84)	24.5 (0.96)	23.3 (0.92)	23.2 (0.91)	29.0 (1.14)	23.4 (0.92)	23.5 (0.93)	24.2 (0.95)	263.7 (10.38)
Average rainy days (≥ 0.2 mm)	3.9	3.3	3.3	4.7	7.5	9.8	11.5	9.9	8.0	6.4	5.6	4.9	78.8
Average afternoon relative humidity (%)	27	28	31	37	47	55	53	43	39	31	29	28	37
Mean monthly sunshine hours	322.4	285.3	288.3	243.0	195.3	156.0	179.8	220.1	234.0	275.9	282.0	303.8	2,985.9
Percentage possible sunshine	73	76	76	72	61	53	57	65	66	69	68	68	67
Source: Australian Bureau of Meteorology (humidity 1991–2010 and sun 1984–2024)
