= Moorook =

Moorook may refer to:

- Moorook, South Australia, a town and locality
- Moorook Game Reserve, a protected area in South Australia
- Moorook Island - refer List of islands within the Murray River in South Australia
- Moorook railway line, a former railway line in South Australia
- Hundred of Moorook, a cadastral unit in South Australia

== See also ==
- Moorook West Wood Camp
