= Woolenook Wood Camp =

Coordinates: 34°17′11″S 140°27′15″E

Woolenook Wood Camp was a World War II internment and prisoner of war camp in the Australian state of South Australia located Murtho along the River Murray, in the state's Riverland. It was officially part of the Loveday Camp complex, and housed Japanese internees and later, Japanese prisoners of war. As internees, they had the option to accept paid work and they were employed as wood cutters for the Allied war effort. Timber was required to fuel Renmark's steam-powered irrigation pump for food production while fossil fuels were in low supply. The cut logs were collected and transported to Renmark on the PS Ulonga captained by Bob Reed. Woolenook was similar to wood camps throughout South Australia at the time, including two others attached to the Loveday POW camps - Moorook West (Wood Camp) and Katarapko (Wood Camp).

The camp consisted of a tented compound, surrounded by barbed wire. The camp guard was provided by members of the 25/33 Garrison Battalion, a militia unit of the Australian Army. At one stage, the civilian internees were removed from the camp for their own safety, because Japanese POWs considered them spies of the Australians. The camp was officially closed on 6 May 1945 and within a year, all salvageable buildings were sold at auction. If you visit the site now, you will need to access it by river. The stone roads and tracks are still visible with some building foundations, the cricket pitch, flattened tennis court area, telegraph cable and some small monuments.

== See also ==
- List of POW camps in Australia
- Loveday Camp 9
- Loveday Camp 10
- Loveday Camp 14
