= Katarapko Wood Camp =

WWII POW camp in Australia

- Location in South Australia
- Location: 34°24′54″S 140°33′36″E

Katarapko Wood Camp was a World War II prisoner of war camp, located on Katarapko Island, on the River Murray near Loxton, in South Australia's Riverland. It was officially part of the Loveday Camp complex, and housed Italian prisoners of war, who were employed as wood cutters for the Allied war effort. It was similar to wood camps throughout South Australia at the time, including two others attached to the Loveday POW camps - Moorook West (Wood Camp) and Woolenook (Wood Camp).

The camp consisted of a tented compound, surrounded by barbed wire. The first Italian prisoners arrived at the camp on 3 May 1942. The camp guard was provided by members of the 25/33 Garrison Battalion, a militia unit of the Australian Army.

Cut timber was used as fuel for the power station and the pumping station at Berri.

== See also ==
- List of POW camps in Australia
- Loveday Camp 9
- Loveday Camp 10
- Loveday Camp 14
