= New Residence =

- Town
- Coordinates: 34.371°S 140.404°E
- Country: Australia
- State: South Australia
- LGA: District Council of Loxton Waikerie
- Location: 19 km (12 mi) NW of Loxton
- Established: 1895

Government
  - State electorate: Chaffey
  - Federal division: Barker

Population
  - Total: 79 (2016 census)
- Postcode: 5333
Localities around New Residence
Yinkanie	Moorook South	Loveday
	New Residence	Spectacle Lake
Wappilka		Pyap

New Residence is a locality on the left bank of the Murray River between Loxton and Kingston On Murray in South Australia's Riverland region. The main industry is grape growing and fruit orchards.

New Residence was first established as a Village settlement with a population of 75 in the last decade of the nineteenth century. These were set up as communes by the Government of South Australia as part of a scheme to mitigate the effects of the economic depression. However, New Residence only lasted as a village settlement for three years before it failed due to the settlers not having the skills and ability needed to make it a success. It was then taken up by a private lessee.

By 1917, a Lutheran school had been established, as it had 30 students when it was closed by the state government due to the anti-German sentiment during World War I. New Residence also has a Lutheran church.
