= Moorook West Wood Camp =

Prisoner of war camp in South Australia

Coordinates: 34°17′11″S 140°27′15″E

Moorook West (Wood Camp) was a short lived World War II prisoner of war camp in the Australian state of South Australia, located in Loveday near the River Murray, in the state's Riverland. It was officially part of the Loveday Camp complex, and housed Japanese prisoners of war. They were employed as wood cutters for the Allied war effort. It was similar to wood camps throughout South Australia at the time, including two others attached to the Loveday POW camps - Woolenook (Wood Camp) and Katarapko (Wood Camp). The camp was officially closed on 21 February 1943.

The camp guard was provided by members of the 25/33 Garrison Battalion, a militia unit of the Australian Army.

== See also ==
- List of POW camps in Australia
- Loveday Camp 9
- Loveday Camp 10
- Loveday Camp 14
