= Loveday, South Australia =

Loveday
- Town
- Coordinates: 34°17′S 140°26′E
- Country: Australia
- State: South Australia
- LGA: Berri Barmera Council
- Established: 1 February 1940 (town); 12 August 1999 (locality)

Government
  - State electorate: Chaffey
  - Federal division: Barker

Population
  - Total: 655 (SAL 2021)
- Postcode: 5345
Localities around Loveday
Kingston-on-Murray	Cobdogla	Barmera
Moorook	Loveday	Glossop
Moorook South	Spectacle Lake	Winkie

Loveday is a town and locality in the Riverland region of South Australia, located east of the Moorook Game Reserve, 6 km south-west of Barmera, and 30 km north-west of Loxton. Administratively it is part of the Berri Barmera Council LGA. During World War II, it housed the largest internment camp complex in Australia, with some 5,000 detainees.

== Details ==
Loveday is close to the Murray River lagoons, known as the "Loveday Lagoons". Loveday was named after Ernest Alfred Loveday, a surveyor in the South Australian Irrigation Department. Today, Loveday is a popular 4 x 4 adventure park.

== Internment camp ==
Loveday was collectively known for its series of internment camps that were established during World War II. The complex eventually consisted of three main camps (Loveday Camp 9, Loveday Camp 10, and Loveday Camp 14 - itself divided into four compounds) and three attached woodcutting camps (at Katarapko, Moorook West and Woolenook), holding a maximum of 5,300 male civilian (and, occasionally, military) prisoners. Approximately 1,500 soldiers guarded the camps at any one time. Officials at the camp included lawyers, intelligence officers, and interpreters such as Donald Laidlaw.

The first camp was established in 1941 and was the largest in Australia (and probably also the southern hemisphere), covering approximately 178 hectares (440 acres). German, Italian, and Japanese civilians and POWs were detained there. Civilian inmates were given the option of undertaking paid agricultural, husbandry, or woodcutting work in nearby areas, such as growing medicinal opium poppies or raising pigs, and were made to wear coats dyed red when outside the camp. While in use, 10 prisoners escaped (one though the fence and nine while on working parties) and an unfinished tunnel made by some Germans was also discovered.

Internees included German kayaker Oskar Speck, who boated from Germany to Australia in the 1930s. Other well-known foreign nationals included Alfred Freund-Zinnbauer and Carl Georg von Brandenstein. In November 1942, Italian anti-fascist activist Francesco Fantin was killed there by a fellow pro-fascist internee. Another was Miyakatsu Koike, a banker who was detained by the Dutch in Java in 1942, sent to Loveday, and who wrote a diary (published in Japan in 1987), now translated and published as Internment Diary: Four Years Life in a Red Coat (2022), of his time in the camp. Well-known Japanese POWs at the camp included Shigetada Nishijima and Hajime Toyoshima. Australians such as P. R. Stephensen were also detained at the camp due to their pro-fascist sympathies.

As the primary site of civilian internment in Australia, the camps were often involved in prisoner exchanges. Camps 9 and 10 were closed in 1943. The Italian Armistice in September 1943 also led to the release of some Italian internees. The end of the war in Europe and Japan led to further releases and deportations. The final camp, Camp 14, was eventually closed in December 1946 and the infrastructure sold off.

The historic Loveday Internment Camp General Headquarters Site in Thiele Road and Brick Boiler Stack, Loveday Irrigation Scheme Pumping Station in Morris Street are listed on the South Australian Heritage Register. The Cobdogla Irrigation and Steam Museum has a substantial display devoted to the internment camp, maintained by the National Trust.
