= Moorook, South Australia =

Moorook South Australia
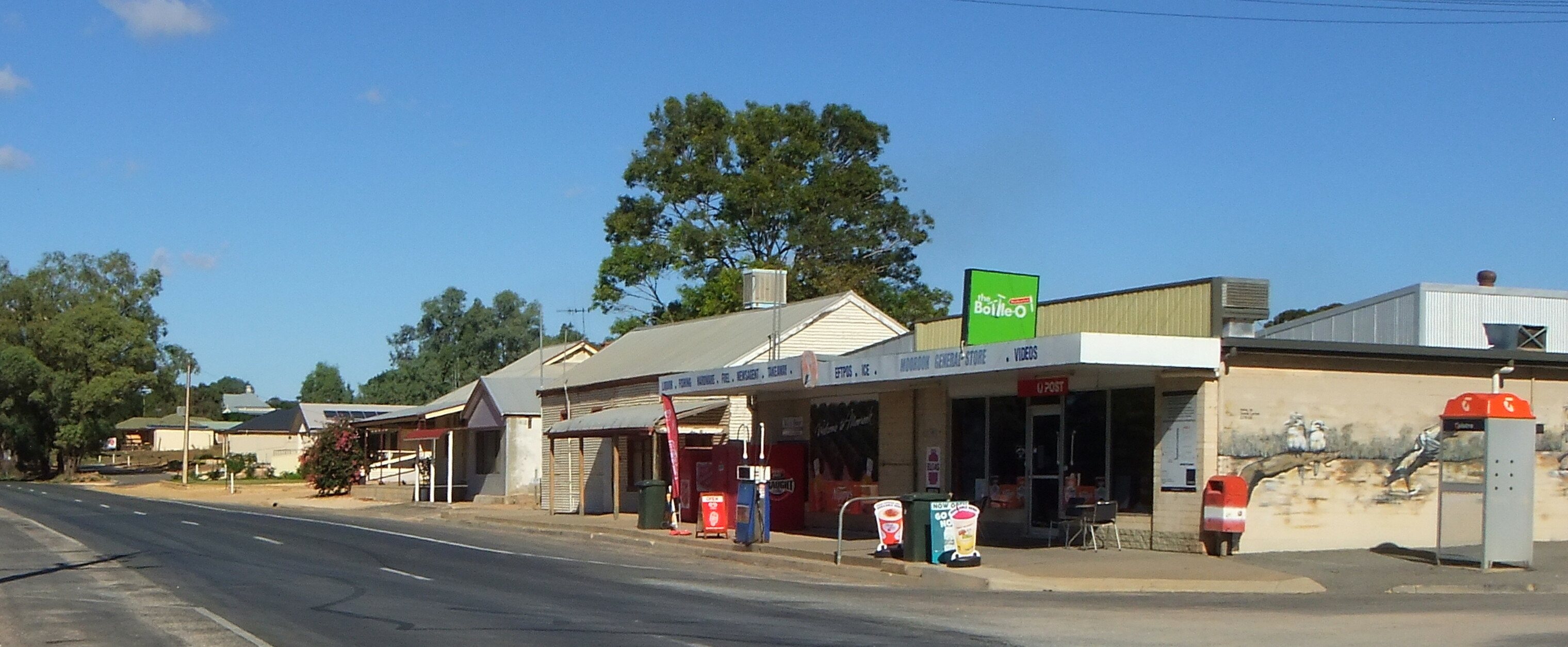
- Moorook

- Coordinates: 34°16′53″S 140°21′48″E
- Population: 171 (SAL 2021)
- Established: 9 November 1922 (town); 28 September 2000 (locality)
- Postcode(s): 5332
- LGA(s): District Council of Loxton Waikerie
- State electorate(s): Chaffey
- Federal division(s): Barker
Localities around Moorook:
Woolpunda	Kingston On Murray	Cobdogla
	Moorook	Loveday
Yinkanie	Moorook South

Moorook is a small town in the Australian state of South Australia, one of a series of towns surrounding lakes in the Riverland region.

Moorook was surveyed in 1922 on the left bank of the River Murray where it flows northwards between Loxton and Kingston on Murray. It is 6 kilometres (4 miles) south of the Sturt Highway. Moorook South, the most populated part of the town, is opposite Moorik Isle and 3 kilometres (2 miles) upstream of most of Moorook Game Reserve, which surrounds and contains Wachtels Lagoon, a 660 hectares (2.5 square miles) area of water fed by the river. The dominant industry is citrus fruit growing; a large processing factory is located there.

Located 6 kilometres (4 miles) south-west of Moorook is Yinkanie, the terminus of the former Moorook railway line, which was open from 1925 to 1971. Intense lobbying by the residents of Kingston On Murray, 8 kilometres (5 miles) to the north, to have the terminus there, ironically resulted in neither becoming the destination.

== Village settlement ==
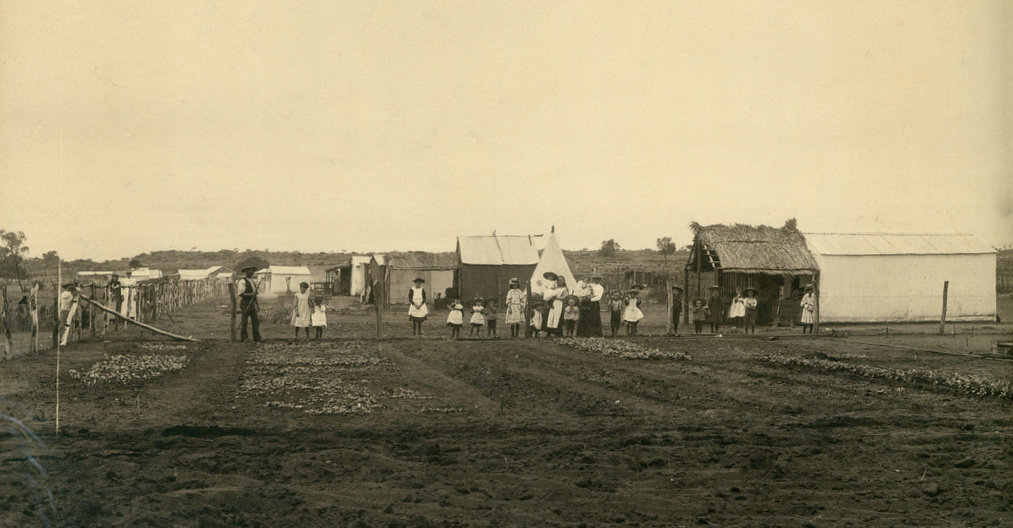
Moorook Village Settlement, River Murray, 1890

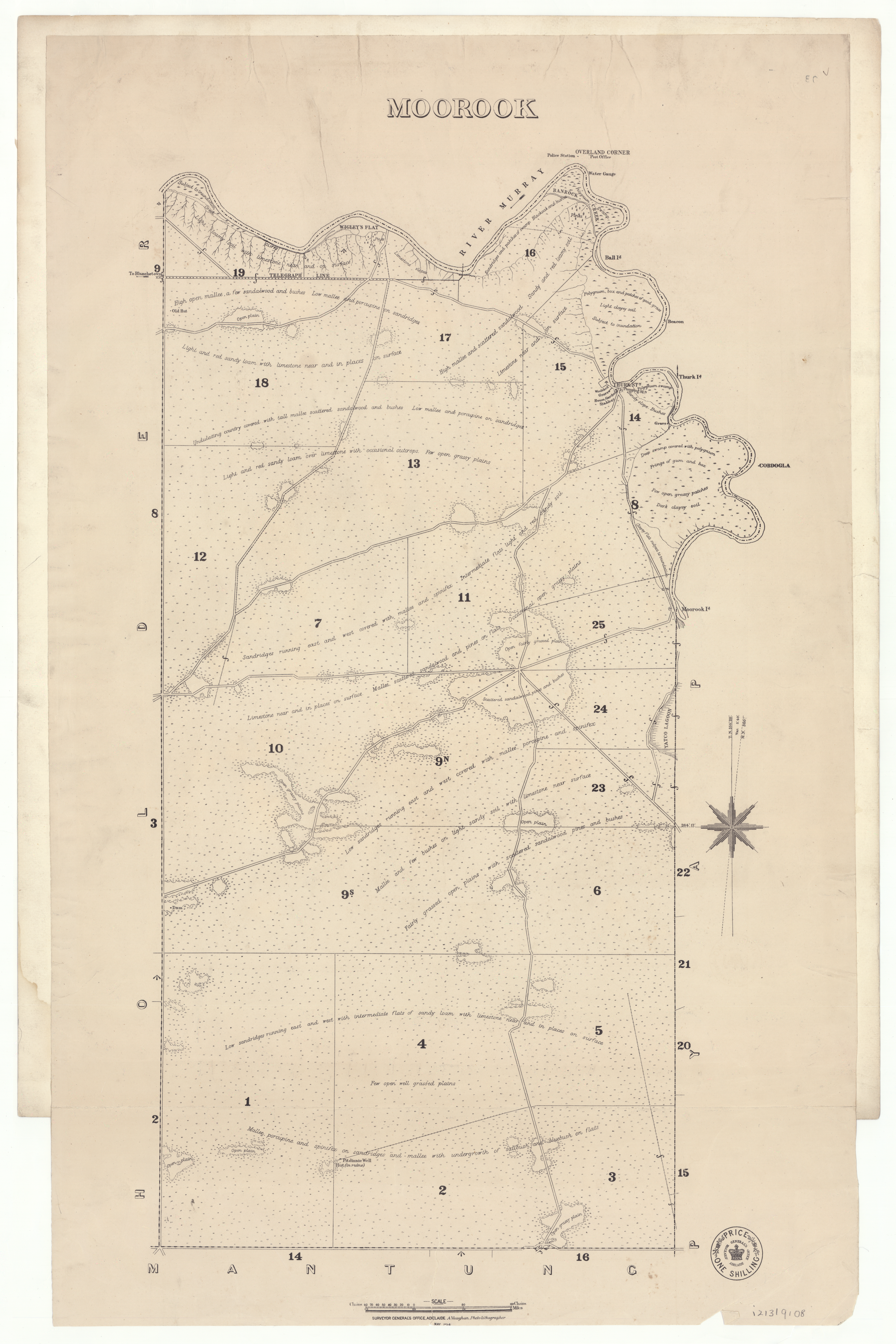
Hundred of Moorook, 1894

Moorook had earlier been one of the experimental Village Settlements. These were established by the South Australian government under Part VII of the Crown Lands Amendment Act 1893, in an attempt to mitigate the effects of the depression then affecting the Colony.

== Hundred of Moorook ==
The Hundred of Moorook was proclaimed in 1893 to facilitate closer settlement of that part of the County of Albert. The Hundred extends from the Murray River on its northern and northeastern boundary south almost to the Stott Highway and town of Wunkar. it includes the towns of Kingston On Murray and Moorook as well as the localities of Wigley Flat, Yinkanie, Wappilka and most of Woolpunda. The Moorook railway line extended to service the hundred from 1925.
