= Yinkanie, South Australia =

Locality in South Australia

Yinkanie South Australia
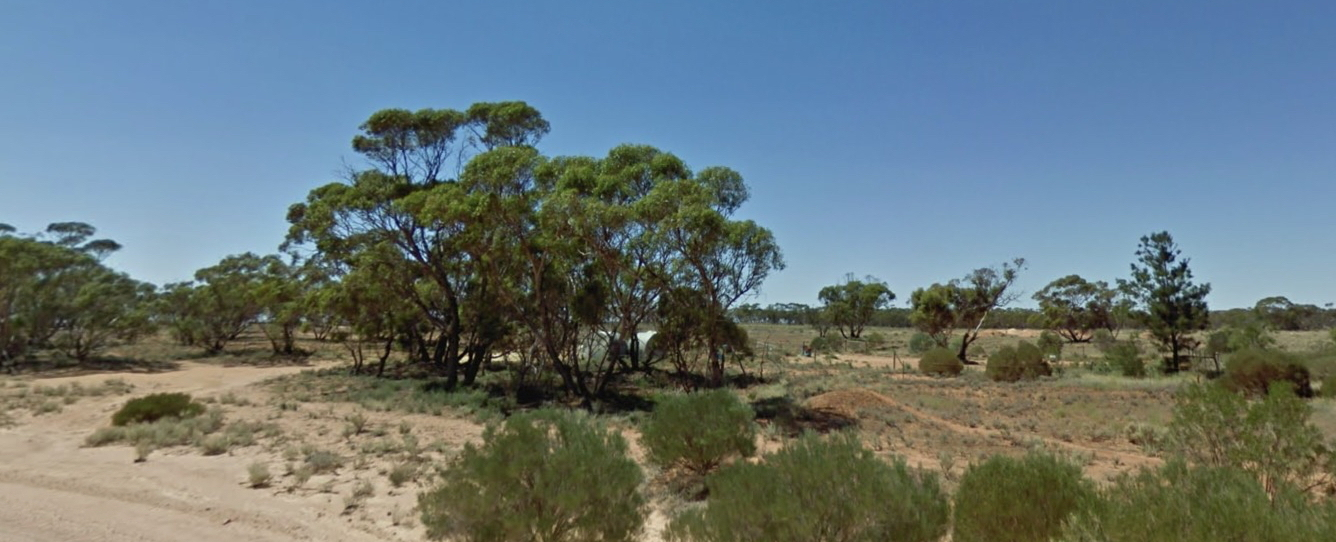
- Mallee-form trees and paddocks at the site of Yinkanie in 2013

- Coordinates: 34.33°S 140.32°E
- Population: 24 (SAL 2021)
- Established: 1926
- Postcode(s): 5332
- Location: 13 km (8 mi) south of Kingston On Murray
- LGA(s): District Council of Loxton Waikerie
- State electorate(s): Chaffey
- Federal division(s): Barker
Localities around Yinkanie:
Woolpunda	Moorook	Moorook South
Holder Siding	Yinkanie	New Residence
Boolgun	Wappilka

Yinkanie is a locality, formerly a small settlement established at the terminus of the Moorook railway line, in the Murraylands region of South Australia near the River Murray. (Note: The Government of South Australia stipulates "River" to be placed first when referring to the two major rivers of the state, the River Murray and River Torrens. Usage outside of South Australia is usually to place "River" last.) The railway line opened in 1925 and closed in 1971; it was never extended to the river.

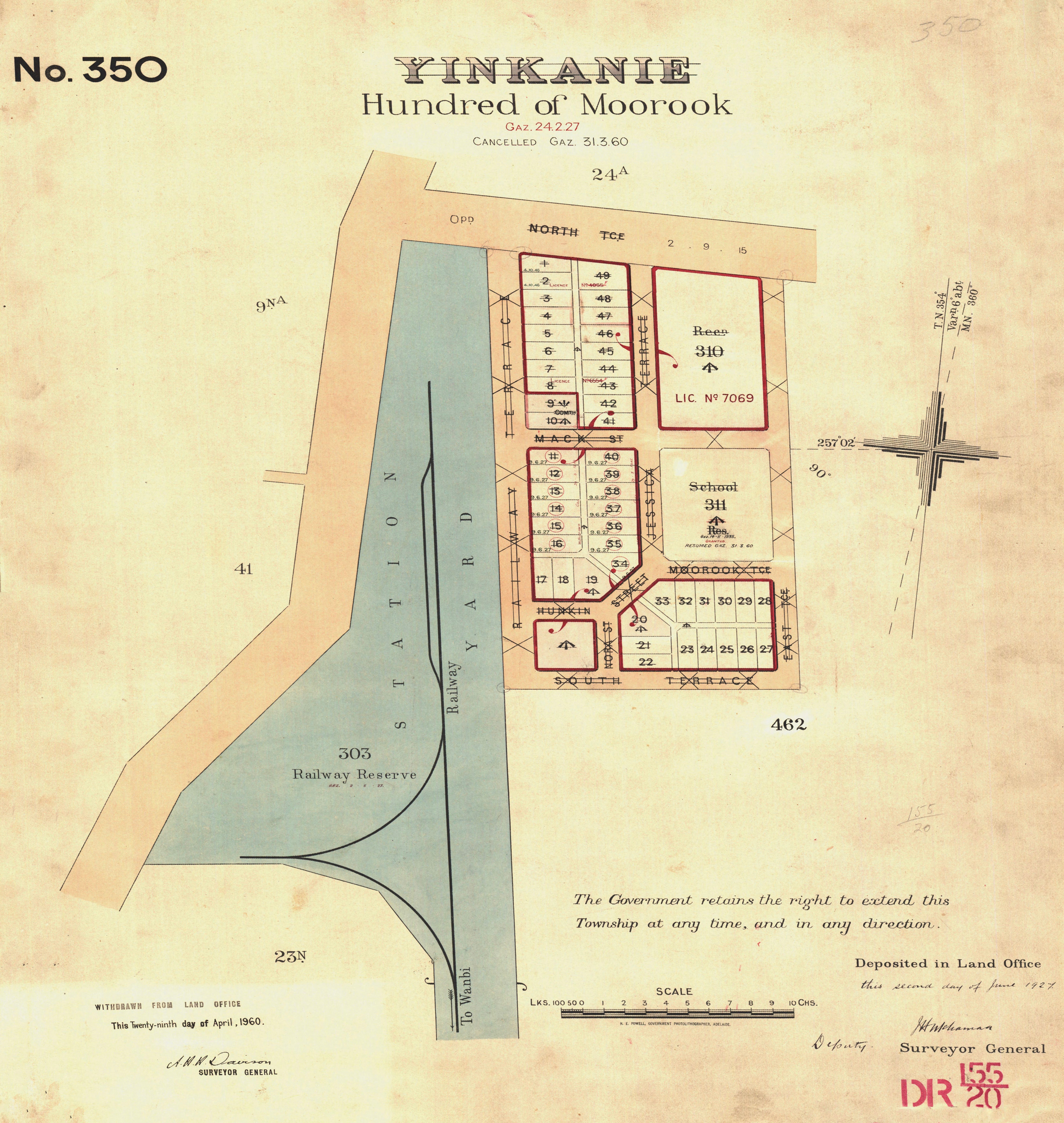
Government town plan of Yinkanie, 1927. The plan provided for 45 house blocks, a school, recreation ground and 4 government services sites. A post office and primary school were the sole buildings erected outside the railway station boundary, but were dismantled when demand – small though it had been – declined.
