= List of World War II prisoner-of-war camps in Australia =

This is a list of prisoner of war camps in Australia during World War II.

During World War II many enemy aliens were interned in Australia under the National Security Act 1939. Prisoners of war were also sent to Australia from other Allied countries for internment in Australia.

Internment camps were established for three reasons – to prevent residents from assisting Australia's enemies, to appease public opinion and to house overseas internees sent to Australia for the duration of the war. Unlike World War I, the initial aim of internment was to identify and intern those who posed a particular threat to the safety or defence of the country. As the war progressed, however, this policy changed and Japanese residents were interned en masse. In the later years of the war, Germans and Italians were also interned on the basis of nationality, particularly those living in the north of Australia. In all, just over 20 per cent of all Italians resident in Australia were interned.

During World War II, Australia interned about 7000 residents, including more than 1500 British nationals. A further 8000 people were sent to Australia to be interned after being detained overseas by Australia's allies. At its peak in 1942, more than 12,000 people were interned in Australia.

== New South Wales ==
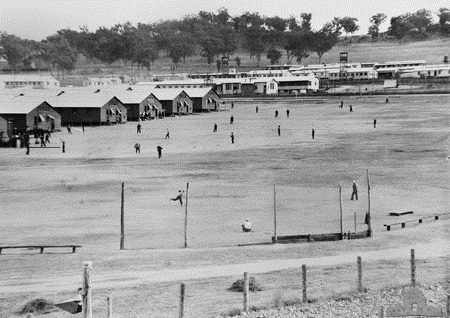
Cowra POW Camp, 1 July 1944

Camp	Place	Notes
6	Hay	
7	Hay	
8	Hay	
9	Oberon	
11	Glen Innes	
12	Cowra	
15	Yanco	
	Bathurst Internment Camp at Bathurst Civil Gaol	
	Liverpool Prisoners Of War and Internment Camp	
	Long Bay Civil Gaol	
	Long Bay State Reformatory	
	Orange Temporary Internment Camp	
	Peat Island Civil Reformatory	

== Queensland ==
Camp	Place	Notes
	Gaythorne Prisoners of War and Internment Camp	
	Chinese Camp at Bulimba shipyard, Brisbane for Native Labour Company	
	Enoggera Temporary Internment and POW Camp	
	North Ward POW Compound	
	Stuart Prison, Stuart, Townsville	
	Thompson's Point POW camp	Unsubstantiated

== South Australia ==
Camp	Place	Notes
9	Loveday	
10	Loveday	
14	Loveday	
17	Sandy Creek Internment and POW Camp	
	Cook POW Labour Camp No. 3 POW Labour Detachment (actually HQ only for six camps)	
	Gladstone Civil Gaol	
	Katarapko Wood Camp	
	Keswick Temporary Internment and Transit Camp	
	Nangwarry Wood Camp	
	Moorook West Wood Camp	
	Wandillo, Prisoner of War Hostel	
	Woolenook Wood Camp	

== Tasmania ==
Camp	Place	Notes
18	Brighton	

== Victoria ==
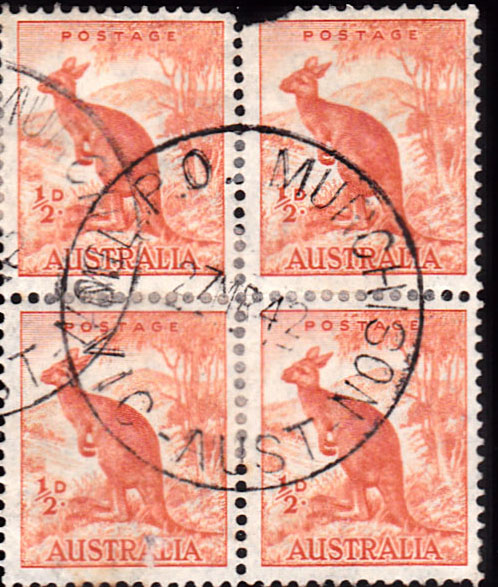
1942 postmark used at Dhurringile

Camp	Place	Notes
1	Tatura	
2	Tatura	
3	Rushworth	
4	Rushworth	
5	Myrtleford CTT	
6	Graytown POW Camp	250 Italian and German internees
13	Murchison	
19	Tatura	
	Camp Darley	
	Camp Pell	Part of Australian Army camp
	Dhurringile Internment and POW Camp (Tatura)	
	Green Mill Temporary Internment Camp (Melbourne)	
	Rowville Internment Camp	

== Western Australia ==
Camp	Place	Notes
11	Harvey Internment Camp	
16	Marrinup POW Camp	
W20	Jarrahdale POW Camp	
	No. 8 Prisoner of War Labour Detachment	From No. 13 camp, Victoria
	No. 11 Detention Barracks Fremantle Prison	
	North Dandalup Work Camp	
	Northam POW Camp	
	Northcliffe POW Camp	
	Parkeston Transit and Detention Camp	
	Rottnest Island POW Hostel	
	Wembley POW Camp	
	Woodman Point Internment Camp	
