= Woolpunda, South Australia =

Woolpunda South Australia
- Coordinates: 34°12′S 140°13′E
- Population: 15 (2016 census)
- Postcode(s): 5330
- Elevation: 80 m (262 ft)
- LGA(s): District Council of Loxton Waikerie
- State electorate(s): Chaffey
- Federal division(s): Barker
Localities around Woolpunda:
Good Hope Landing	Wigley Flat
Kanni	Woolpunda	Kingston on Murray
Holder Siding	Boolgun, Yinkanie	Moorook

Woolpunda is a locality in the Riverland region of South Australia. It is on the south side of the Sturt Highway west of Kingston on Murray. The Woolpunda irrigation scheme was established in the 1920s in the northwestern part of the Hundred of Moorook.

At the 2016 census, the population was 15 people. The locality has previously had a school house and hall. It still has a water tower positioned on high ground. The water tower was built in 1922 and is 126 feet (38 m) tall. The pump station to lift water from the Murray River is now in the newer locality of Wigley Flat. The land is used for a mixture of broadacre grain farming and more intensive irrigated fruit and vegetable crops, including grapes and olives.
