= Block (rural Australia) =

Australian term for a small agricultural landholding

Block is an Australian term for a small agricultural landholding. Block settlement has been used by Governments to encourage decentralization and during financial depressions to give families of unemployed workers an opportunity (frequently illusory) to become primary producers. It may also refer to a lifestyle choice or "hobby farm" for those with an independent source of income.

In parts of Australia, parcels of land of around 6 to 20 acres (2 to 8 ha) were allocated by Government to working-class men at nominal rent during the depression of the 1890s with the object of giving them work and, potentially, a source of income. Some eventually prospered, but those on marginal land were doomed to failure. Proponents of the "block system" included George Witherage Cotton. Holders of such allotments were referred to as "blockers" or "blockies".

== See also ==
- Village Settlements (South Australia)
- Soldier settlement (Australia)
