= Moorook Game Reserve =

Protected area in South Australia

- IUCN category VI (protected area with sustainable use of natural resources)
- Location within South Australia
- Location: South Australia, Kingston-on-Murray and Moorook
- Nearest city: Cobdogla; Moorook
- Coordinates: 34°14′57″S 140°22′15″E
- Area: 12.44 km^{2} (4.80 sq mi)
- Established: 2 September 1976
- Visitors: 'large numbers' (in 1994)
- Governing body: Department for Environment and Water
- Website: Official website

Moorook Game Reserve is a protected area in the Australian state of South Australia covering the floodplain on the south side of the River Murray in the localities of Kingston-on-Murray and Moorook immediately south of the section of the Sturt Highway that passes between the towns of Kingston-on-Murray in the west and Cobdogla in the east. It is located about 180 kilometres (110 miles) east north-east of the state capital of Adelaide.

The game reserve occupies land in sections 474, 475 and 476 in the cadastral unit of the Hundred of Moorook, which covers Wachtels Lagoon and low-lying land to the south-east. It was proclaimed on 2 September 1976 under the National Parks and Wildlife Act 1972. The Loch Luna Game Reserve immediately adjoins the game reserve's northern boundary. It and the Loch Luna Game Reserve are reported as providing "significant wildlife habitat and are popular recreation sites, particularly for river-based activities and camping". As of 2018, it covered an area of 12.44 square kilometres (4.80 sq mi).

In 1980, the game reserve was described as follows:

Moorook Game Reserve is an area of wetland habitat in the River Murray floodplain 9 km west of Barmera (3km south of Kingston-on-Murray). It has been reserved for the management and conservation of waterfowl, particularly native game species. Shooting of some species is permitted during restricted open seasons…

Moorook Game Reserve encompasses a large open swamp, Wachtel's Lagoon, fringed by river red gums (Eucalyptus camaldulensis) and river box (Eucalyptus largiflorens). It is situated on the western bank of the River Murray, 3km. south of Kingston-on-Murray. Development of a small area of the Reserve for controlled production of waterfowl food crops is planned for the near future. These crops will be grown in the southwestern corner of the Reserve…

Mostly unmodified, although irrigation drainage and some local effluent seep into one corner of the Reserve.

The game reserve is classified as an IUCN Category VI protected area. In 1980, it was listed on the now-defunct Register of the National Estate.

== See also ==
- Duck hunting in South Australia
- Riverland Biosphere Reserve
