= Cobdogla =

- Town
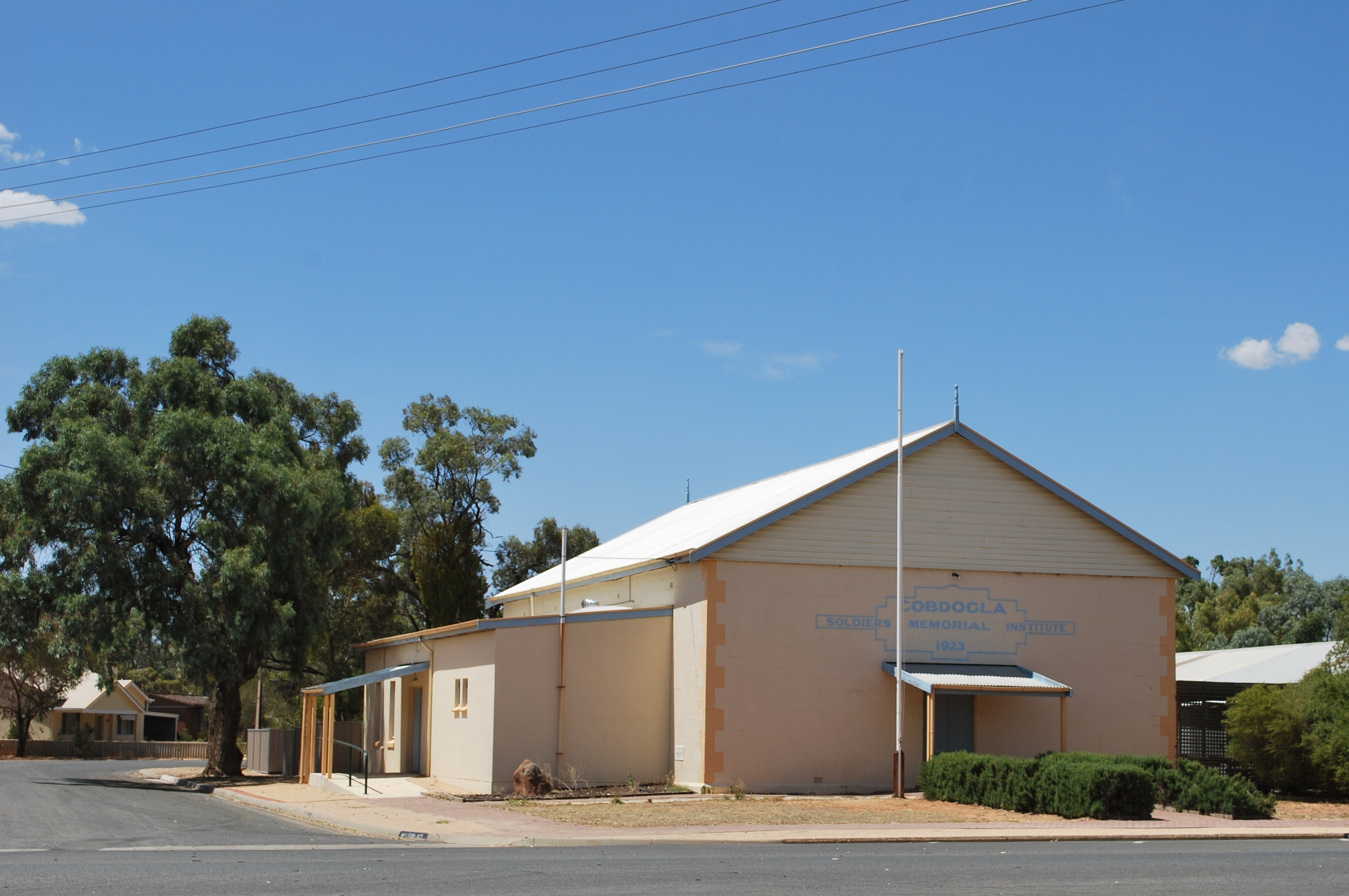
- Soldiers Memorial Institute

- Coordinates: 34°14′31″S 140°24′22″E
- Country: Australia
- State: South Australia
- LGA: Berri Barmera Council
- Location: 214 km (133 mi) NW of Adelaide; 37 km (23 mi) SE of Renmark; 6 km (3.7 mi) E of Barmera, South Australia
- Established: 1 May 1919 (town); 3 December 1998 (locality)

Government
  - State electorate: Chaffey
  - Federal division: Barker

Population
  - Total: 197 (UCL 2021)
- Postcode: 5346
Localities around Cobdogla
Overland Corner
Kingston on Murray	Cobdogla	Barmera
Moorook	Loveday

Cobdogla is a town in the Riverland region of South Australia, The town is on the Murray River, 232 kilometres (144 mi) north-east of the state capital, Adelaide. At the 2021 census, Cobdogla had a population of 197.

Cobdogla is the home of the Irrigation and Steam Museum, centred on a pair of Humphrey pumps, one of which is operable, (Note: The remarkable Humphrey pump, the only functioning example in the world, has been demonstrated at open days in the early 21st-century, contingent on OH&S approval.) and boasts a working 3 km railway with both a diesel and a steam locomotive (originally used by Humes Ltd. to transport pipes for the Loveday pipeline), a traction engine and numerous stationary engines, all in working order, maintained and operated by enthusiasts, as well as static displays on various river topics – Village Settlements, Loveday Internment Camp and Irrigation maintained by the National Trust of South Australia. Open days are infrequent as a great deal of (voluntary) labour is involved.

The historic Cobdogla Homestead Ruins and the Humphrey pumps at the former Cobdogla Pumping Station are listed on the South Australian Heritage Register.

== Gallery ==
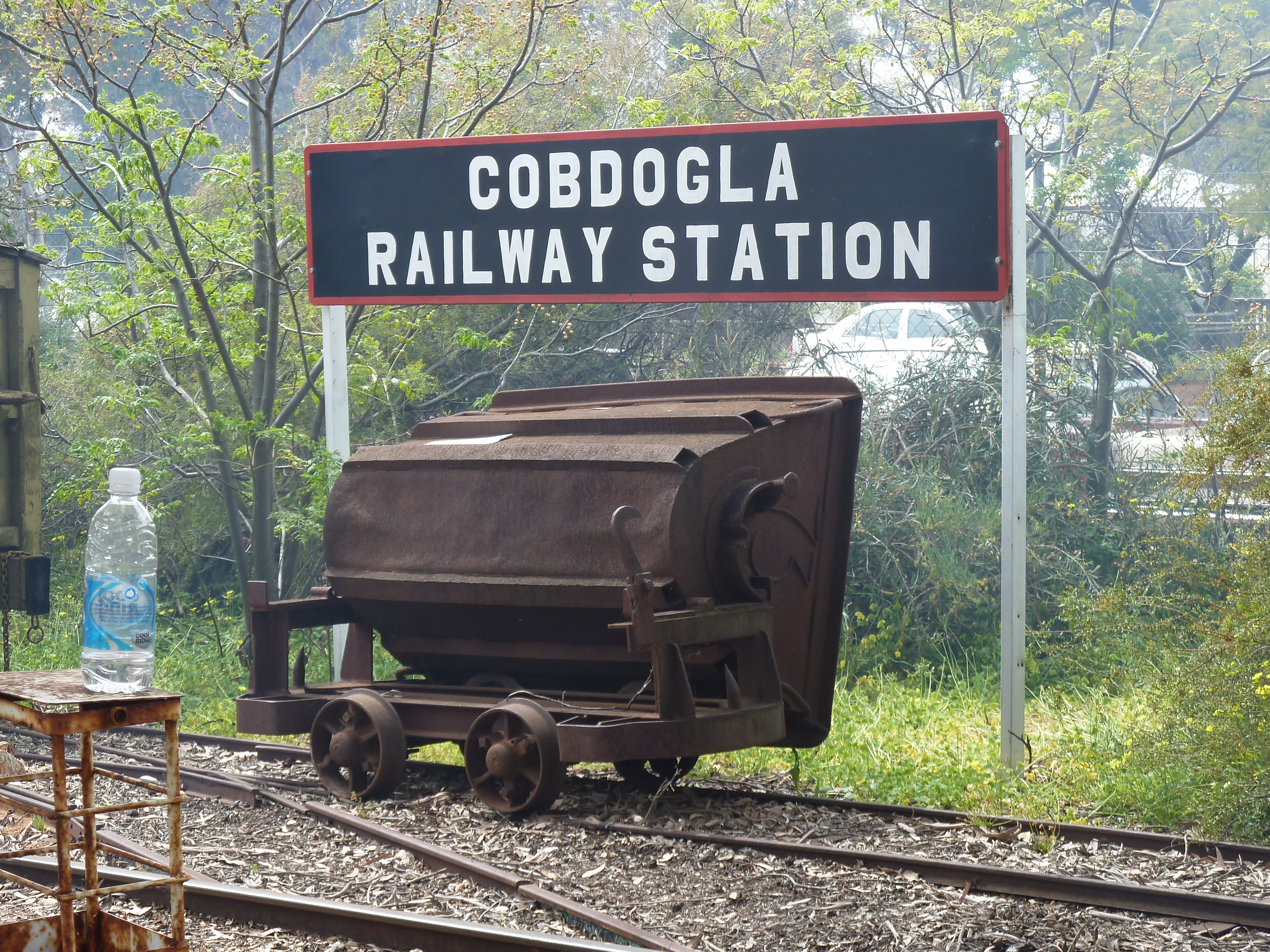
Cobdogla Railway Station sign

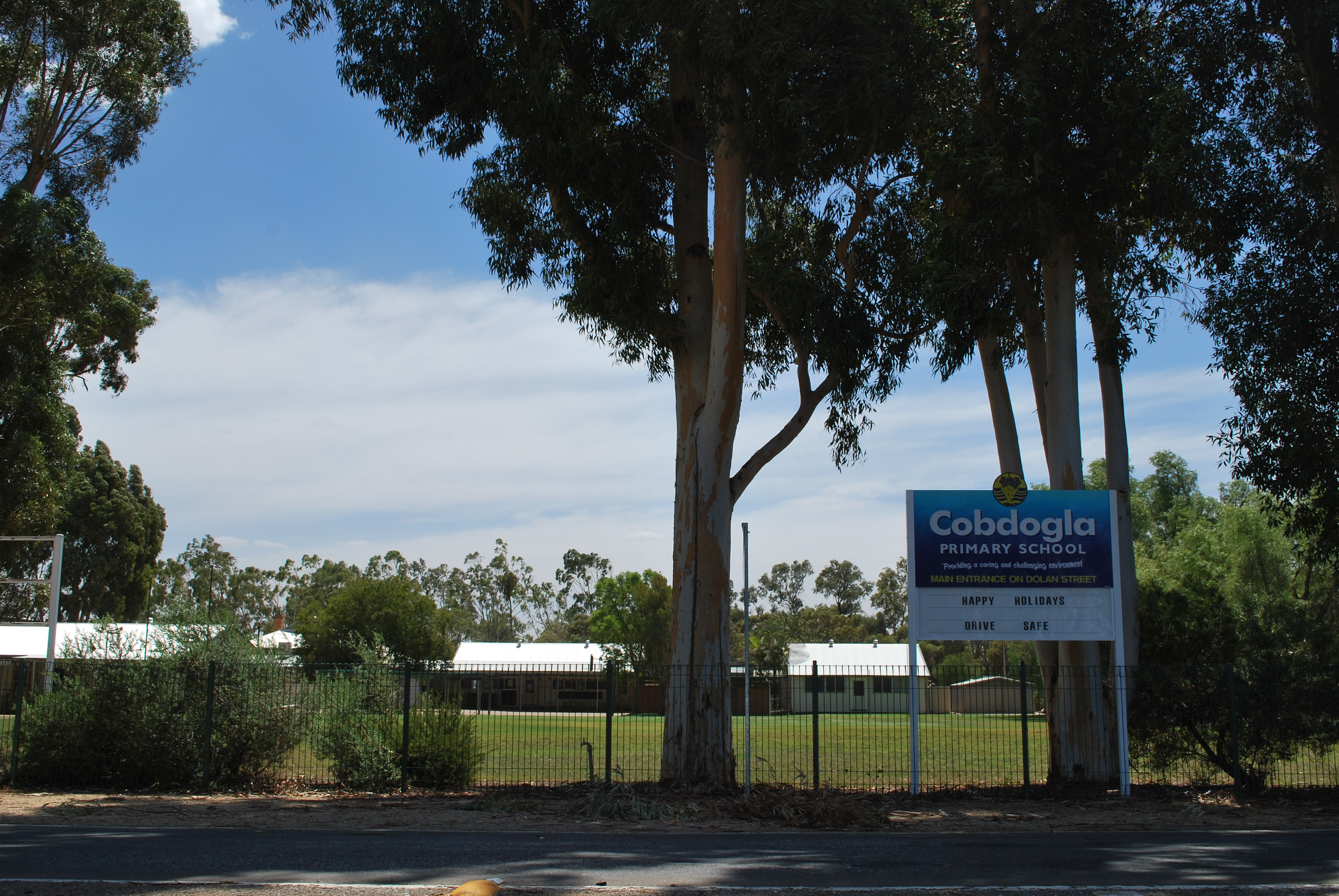
Primary school

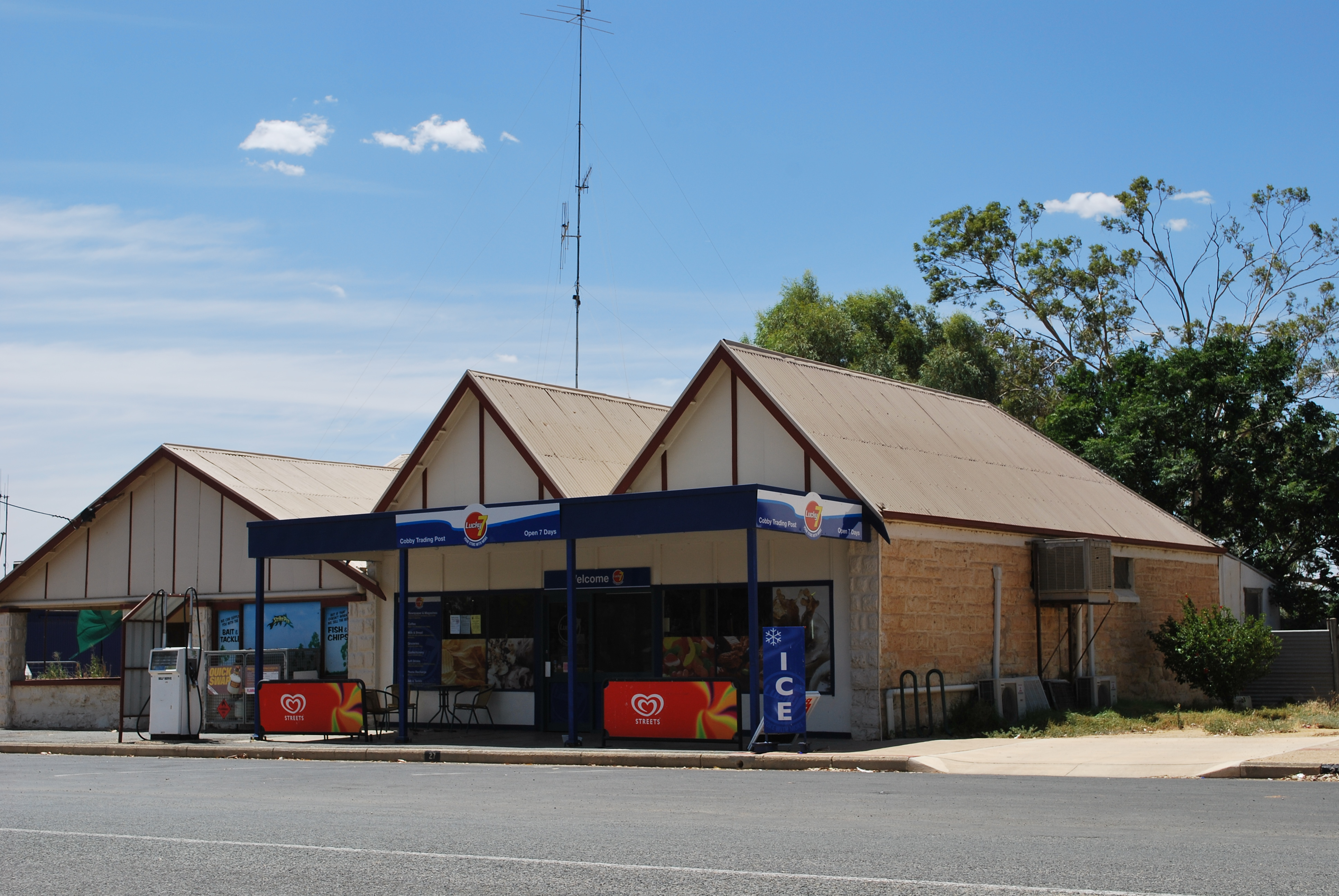
General store

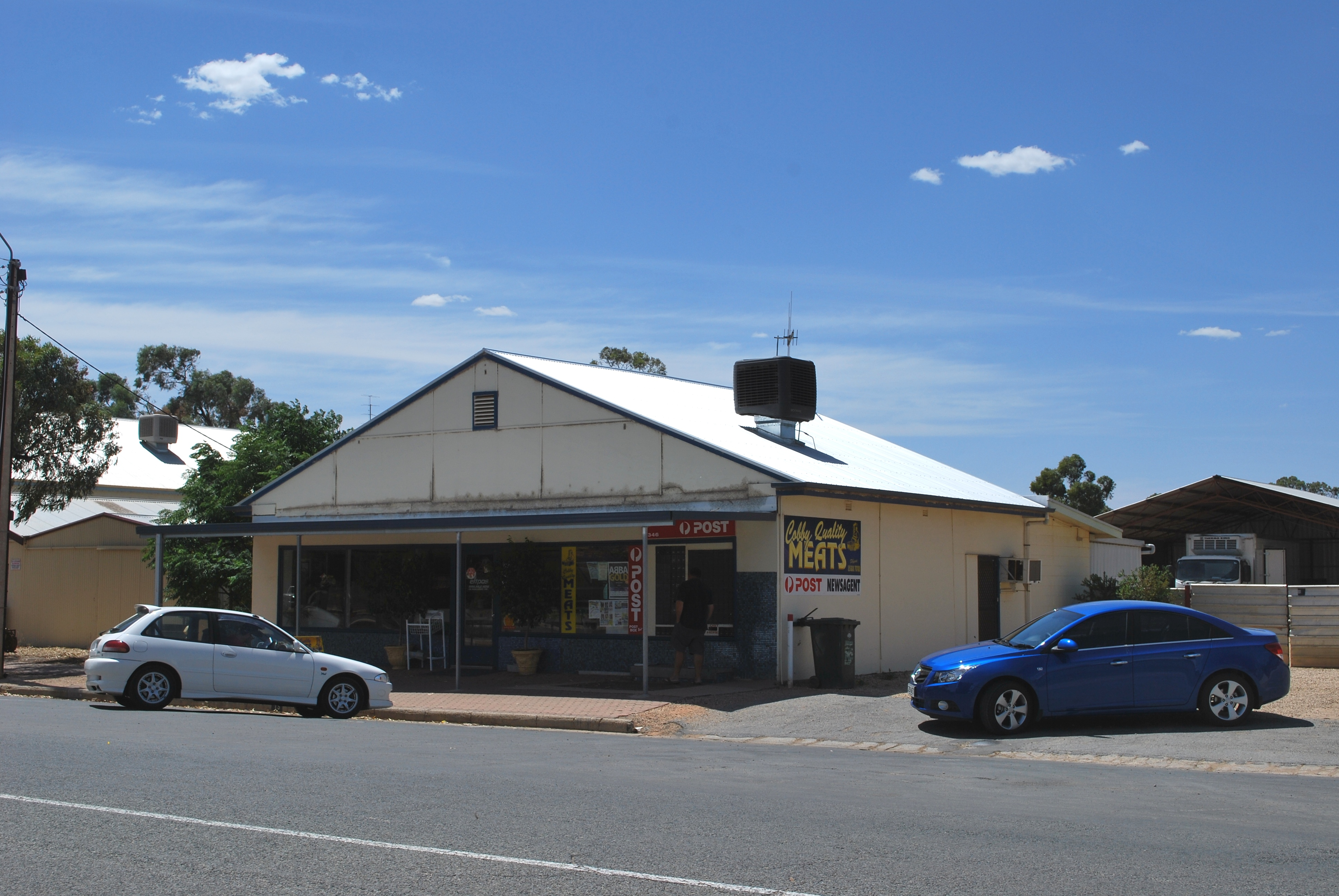
Butcher and post office

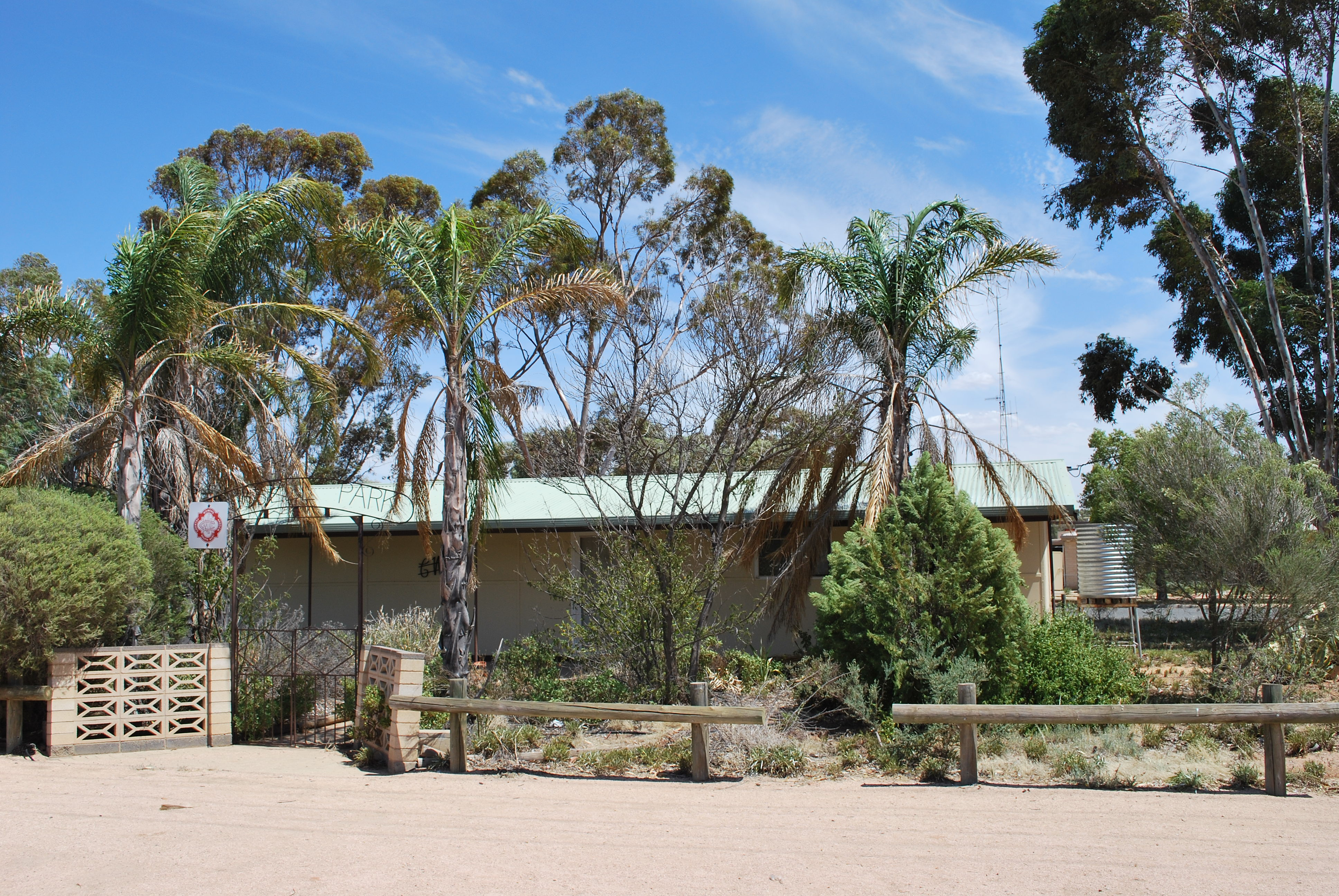
CWA rooms

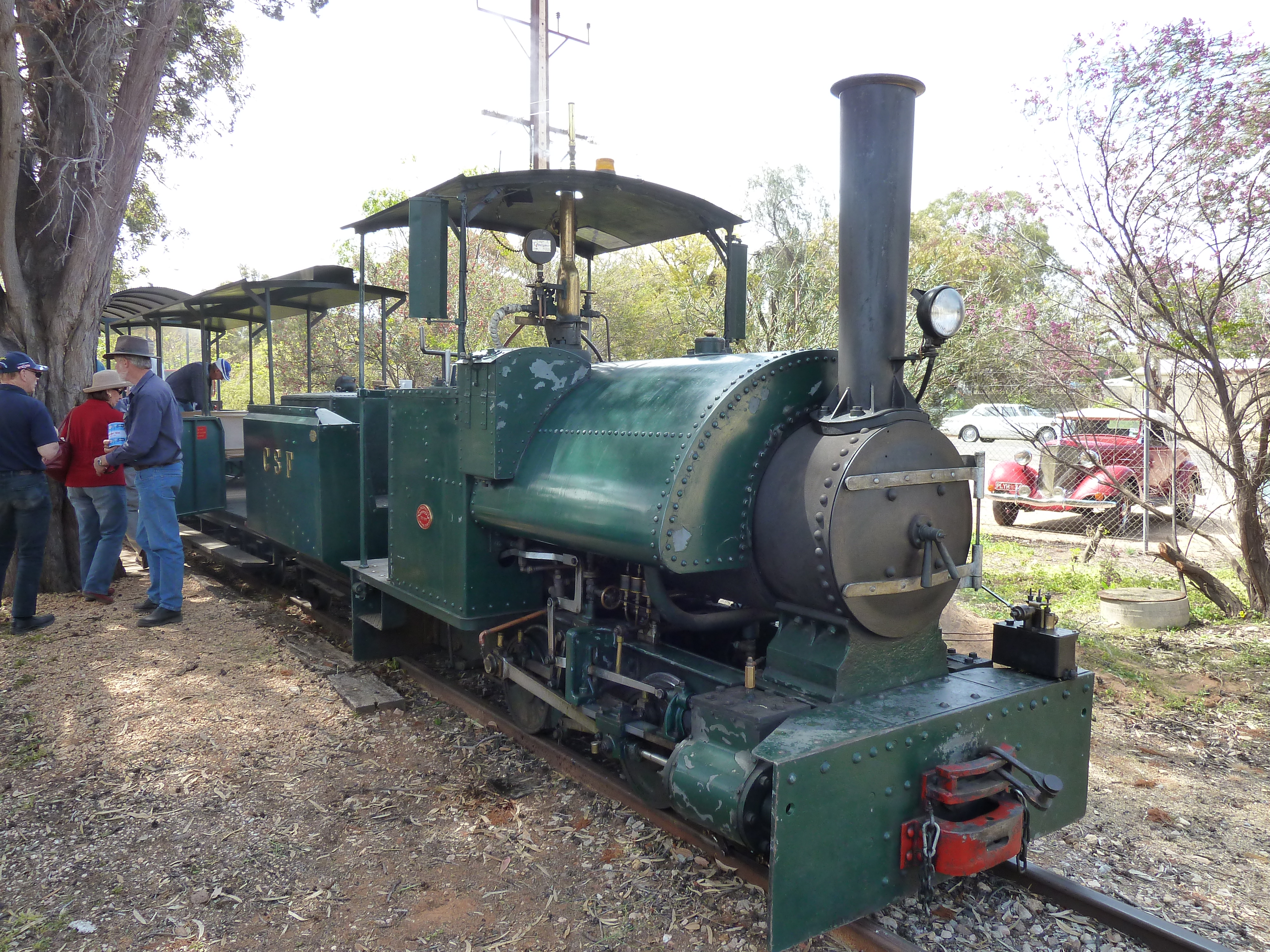
1906 built 0-4-0ST Bagnall steam locomotive at Cobdogla Steam and Irrigation Museum.
