= Wappilka =

Locality in the Murray Mallee region of South Australia

Wappilka South Australia
- Coordinates: 34.39°S 140.32°E
- Population: 17 (SAL 2021)
- Postcode(s): 5332
- Location: 20 km (12 mi) south of Kingston On Murray
- State electorate(s): Chaffey
- Federal division(s): Barker
Localities around Wappilka:
	Yinkanie
Boolgun	Wappilka	New Residence
	Wunkar	Pyap

Wappilka is a locality in the Murray Mallee region of South Australia.

Wappilka was founded based on the Wappilka siding on the Moorook railway line. The railway opened in 1925 and closed in 1971. The town was surveyed in August 1926 and declared ceased to exist in February 1960. The railway siding received 30,000 bags of wheat in the 1926–1927 season.

The name continues to be used for the locality.
