= Francesco Fantin =

Italian anti-fascist activist

Francesco Giovanni Fantin (20 January 1901 - 16 November 1942) was an Italian anti-fascist activist who emigrated to Australia in 1924 and found work in Queensland as a cane cutter. He remained politically active as an anti-fascist organiser and fundraiser but was killed after being detained and sent to an internment camp in 1942.

== Life ==
Fantin was born in San Vito di Leguzzano near Venice, Italy on 20 January 1901. He was one of five children born to Giovanni (Battista) Fantin, a textile worker, and his conservative Catholic wife Catarina, née Manea. Following in his father's trade, he became an active unionist and, by the time he was a teenager, he was also active in the anarchist paramilitary.

He emigrated to Australia after the rise of Mussolini to power and becoming estranged from his wife, following other activists, arriving in Melbourne on 27 December 1924. He then worked with his brother in Queensland as a cane cutter, becoming active in the AWU there. His agitation helped standardise the practice of cane burning which helped protect workers from rat-bourne disease. By the 1930s, he was working in Geelong as was known as Frank Fantin and was active as an anti-fascist.

In 1940, he was mistakenly identified as a fascist and was eventually detained on 14 February 1942. One month later, he was sent by train to Brisbane then to Loveday Internment Camp 14A, near Barmera in South Australia. He was then impounded with all other Italians, irrespective of their origins, background, or political history.

== Death ==
In early November, eight months after being transferred to the camp, his case was under review with the intention of his release due to his anti-fascist stance. On 16 November, however, after several other assaults and threats, he was injured and died in suspicious circumstances. The number of assailants was unclear but ultimately a killer, Giovanni Bruno Casotti (aged 27), a known fascist, was tried in Adelaide and convicted of manslaughter. Informally, he was also accused of murder by communists who considered Fantin an ally, and an enemy of the fascist regimes of Mussolini and Hitler. Casotti received a two-year sentence after pleading guilty - leading to a public outcry which was resisted by the government and army in the name of national security. After release, Casotti was deported (before returning to Australia in 1954).

Fantin's death became the subject of a bilingual play about the suppression of minorities and wrongful internment written by Teresa Crea, entitled Red Like the Devil. It was first performed in 1983 by Adelaide-based theatre company, Doppio Teatro in Adelaide and at Loveday. Performances were also later staged in Canberra in 1991.
