= Village Settlements (South Australia) =

The Village Settlements were communes set up by the South Australian government under Part VII of the Crown Lands Amendment Act 1893, a scheme intended to mitigate the effects of the depression that was affecting the Colony. It followed the New Zealand Village Settlements Act and similar schemes in Canada and New South Wales, and concurrently with Victoria. It followed the "blockers" scheme espoused by George W. Cotton.

Thirteen settlements were surveyed: Lyrup, Pyap, Kingston, Waikerie, Moorook, Ramco, Holder, Murtho, New Residence, Gillen, New Era and Charleston-on-Murray all on the River Murray, Mount Remarkable in the Mid North, and Nangkita to the south of Adelaide.

Holder and Murtho were proclaimed as Village Settlements by May 1896, Lyrup, Pyap, Kingston, Waikerie, Moorook and Ramco followed.

The Village Settlement Aid Society was formed to give financial and other assistance to the "villagers". Its secretary was Thomas Hyland Smeaton.

Locations of the Riverland settlements

== The settlements ==
=== Murtho ===
Some 2–3 miles (3–5 km) upstream (north) from Renmark, Murtho was better financed than the others, demanding £60 from families and £40 from singles as start-up capital. Its chairman was Henry Cordeaux ( –1902). Dubbed "gentleman farmers", the Murthoites were Utopian idealists rather than impoverished workers. Among those who lost substantial sums were John Napier Birks (1845–1929) and Walter Richard Birks (1847–1900), of Adelaide's prominent Birks family. In 1897 some 60 or 70 acres were under irrigation, but the project was abandoned in 1899 after most settlers had left. A major factor in the failure of Murtho was the expense and problems involved in pumping the water: the land allocated was some 120 feet (37 m) above the river level, necessitating an expensive and inefficient double-acting plunger pump. The settlers were incapable of the communistic spirit needed for the project to survive crop failures, and the Government-appointed manager (Samuel McIntosh) made only occasional contact with the settlers. Transportation of supplies and produce was hugely expensive, slow, intermittent and unreliable.

=== Lyrup ===
160 acres of Government land on the banks of the Murray was allocated to the cooperative on perpetual lease; 98 men, 40 married women and around 70 juveniles left Adelaide by train on 20 February 1894 for Morgan, thence to Lyrup by steamboat. The committee of trustees consisted of R. P. Bambrick (chairman), F. P. Shelley, S. J. Gallary, F. G. Godwin, and E. Dwyer. The Treasurer was J. Errey and the Secretary R. H. Lawrence (Lawrance?). In March 1895 there were 78 members and around 330 total, and the chairman was Ross. It benefited from its proximity to Renmark, and cooperation from Chaffey Brothers' settlers.

=== Pyap ===
The next settlement downstream from Lyrup, about 3 miles west of Loxton, it started out in March 1894 with 94 members on 9,145 acres (3,700 ha) and a total population of 388. The founding chairman was A. H. Brocklehurst and the secretary J. W. Rawnsley; a year later there were 75 and a total population of around 400.

=== New Residence ===
The next settlement downstream (about 10 miles north!) from Pyap, with 14 members and population of 75 on 4,000 acres (1,600 ha). The settlement had failed by 1896 and vacated in 1897. It was taken over by a private lessee.

=== Moorook ===
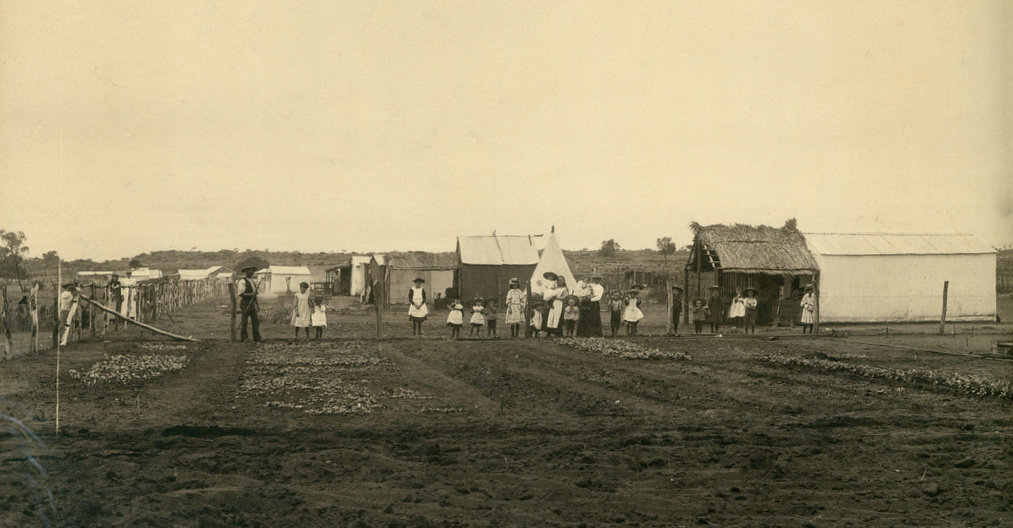
Moorook Village Settlement, River Murray, 1890

The next settlement downstream (about 10 miles north) from New Residence. In 1896 they had 20 members and a total population of 100.

=== Kingston ===
This settlement had the advantage of pre-existing buildings from Thurk sheep station. Chairman was J. Weatherall and D. Holberton the secretary. There were 21 married members and a total population 100, and suffered from insufficient finance.

=== Holder ===
Started in March 1894 with 71 members; a year later there were 53 and a population of around 250 on an area of 5,750 acres (2,330 ha). This settlement also had the advantage of a substantial building already from a previous sheep station. In May 1894 the chairman was S. Dyke and the secretary H. Crocker. In 1895? the chairman was C. Anderson and the secretary W. Barker. In 1901 it was allowed to convert from a commune to individual holdings.

=== Waikerie ===
On 19 February 1894, an advance party of twenty left for the Waikeri (as it was then spelled) settlement, for which 5,200 acres had been surveyed. Sir E. T. Smith helped financially. Chairman was a Mr. Malcolm, secretary J. Rowe. The initial settlers consisted of 65 men, 85 women and around 50 children. Fourteen of the original 65 members (mostly single men) split from the party to found Ramco and a year later there were 34 members in a population of 154.

=== Ramco ===
An area of 3,400 acres settled by 14 members, mostly single men, who left Waikerie settlement, and in mid-1894 were given a second chance at Ramco, about 2 miles (3.2 km) downstream (west) of Waikerie. Its first chairmen were successively George Malcolm, Edward Quinn; Harry Blizard the secretary.

=== Charleston ===
Around 10 miles (16 km) upstream from Gillen, the first settler was a Mr. Morgan who lived in a steamer moored in the river. It appears that this never eventuated as a village settlement.

- Note this location, named for D. M. Charleston, MP, MLC (1891-1901) has no relation to the Adelaide Hills town of Charleston, named for its founder, Charles Dunn.

=== Gillen ===
The only settlement on the north banks of the Murray, around 22 miles (35 km) upstream from New Era, this settlement of 60 men and their families was subject to an early split; the original trustees and chairman leaving. George Mitchell was the new chairman. This settlement came in for most criticism in an 1895 survey of sanitary arrangements. Named for Peter Paul Gillen MHA, Commissioner for Crown Lands and champion of the Village Settlement scheme, it was one of the first to fail. "It was an example of communism in its worst phase, and the experiment at Gillen resulted in a dead loss to the State of 3,580 pounds."

=== New Era ===
7 miles (11 km) upstream from Morgan was settled by 25 men, mostly married, many fishermen from Port Adelaide, and about 40 children on 2,000 acres (810 ha) . First chairman was G. Ashby, followed by a Mr. Carr. The venture failed in 1896 and the land taken over by a private company. The Cadell area now includes the land of New Era.

=== Mount Remarkable ===
597 acres (242 ha) around 1.5 miles (2.4 km) from Melrose, on the western side of the Wilmington road, was settled by a party led by J. W. Hack.

=== Nangkita ===
An area of 1,800 acres (730 ha), of which 300 acres (120 ha) is swamp, nestled between two hills, about 5 km east of Mount Compass. Its chairman of trustees was J. Mossop and McKinlay the secretary. There were 25 men, 16 women and 43 children, all from Port Adelaide, teetotalers, and known to each other. Some success was achieved in growing tobacco and flax but food crops were attacked by grubs. Government resumed the lease in 1898.

== Into the twentieth century ==
Settlement	Map #	Area in acres	1894 population	1902 population	Area irrigated 1902	Closed
Charleston	78					Never gazetted
Gillen	77	10,000	109			1895
Holder	83	7,560	232	74	220	1896
Kingston	92	3,625	114	56	180	
Lyrup	107	14,000	293	105	500	
Moorook	94	8,200	52	52	160	
Mount Remarkable		597	111		0	1896
Murtho	115		13			1899
Nangkita		1,800	113			1898
New Era	73	2,000	72			1896
New Residence	96	4,000	75			1896
Pyap	99	9,145	335	69	210	
Ramco	80	3,685	34	38	150	
Waikerie	82	3,340	180	64	290	

- "Map #" refers to the River Murray sequence of maps in South Australian Waters, a publication of the Boating Industry Association of South Australia, which follows the path of the Murray, so is a useful index of sequence up the river (Tailem Bend is 30, Morgan 71, Renmark 111, roughly 5 km per page).
