= Oskar Speck =

German who kayaked to Australia (1907–1993)

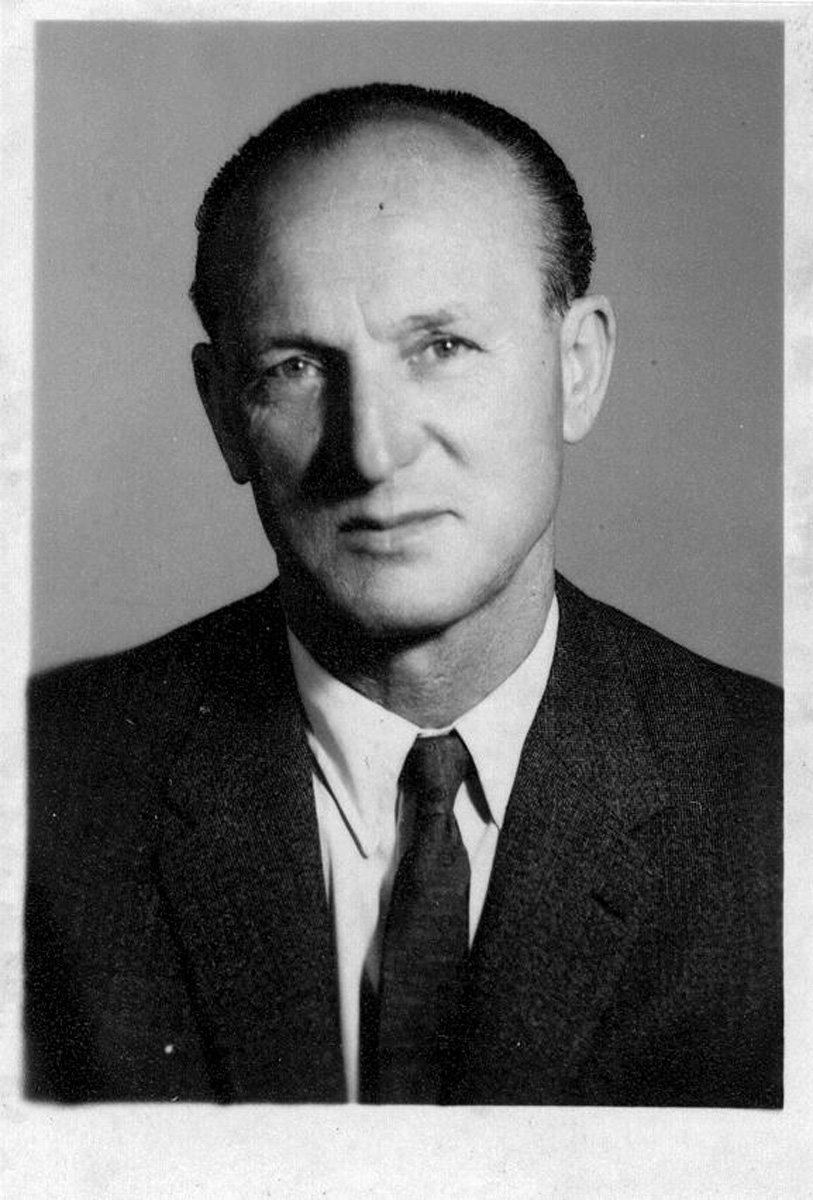
- Born: 4 March 1907; Hamburg, Germany
- Died: 28 March 1993 (aged 86); Australia
- Occupations: Sports figure, merchant
- Known for: Kayaking from Germany to Australia
- Partner: Nancy Steele

Oskar Speck (4 March 1907 – 28 March 1993) was a German canoeist who kayaked from Germany to Australia. He departed from Ulm, Germany in 1932 to seek work due to being unable to find work as an electrical contractor in Hamburg. He initially intended to kayak to Cyprus to work in the copper mines but ended up continuing the journey through the Middle East and Southeast Asia to Australia.

Speck arrived in Australia in 1939, at the beginning of the Second World War. He was interned as an enemy alien. When the war ended, he was released from imprisonment and later became a successful opal merchant in Sydney.

== Early life ==
In 1921, aged 14, Oskar Speck left school to work. During the 1920s, kayaking was becoming an increasingly popular sport throughout Europe. One of the most common kayaks from the time was called a Sunnschien, a folding kayak or faltboot. They consisted of treated canvas skin that was pulled over a wooden frame.

As the great depression struck after the First World War, Speck was unable to find work in his hometown. Due to the lack of money and the rumours of miners being needed in Cypriot copper mines, Speck decided to kayak there, disregarding the risks including dangerous conditions and his inability to swim.

== The voyage ==
=== Germany to Cyprus ===
Speck left Ulm in May 1932 by kayaking down the river Danube to Romania. He continued to follow the river until he reached the Bulgarian border and entered the Aegean Sea. Speck had never kayaked at sea, but nonetheless ended up paddling through high swell and large waves, even narrowly avoided a collision with a cargo ship.

Speck added sails as well as splashguards to make the kayak more efficient as well as to prevent it filling up. After these modifications, Speck travelled through the Aegean and the Mediterranean seas by going along the islands and following the coast of Turkey to Cyprus.

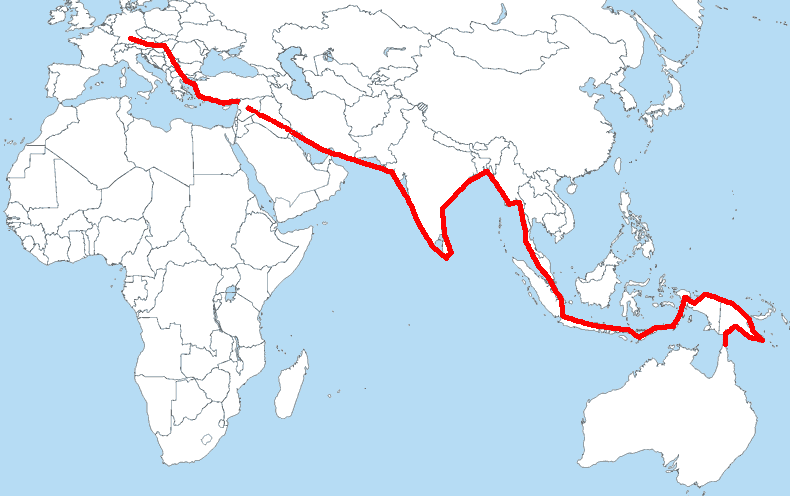
A map showing the route that Oskar Speck took on his voyage from Germany to Australia

=== Cyprus to Australia ===
He then travelled east to Syria to reach the Euphrates River, which he then kayaked down on through Iraq to get to the Persian Gulf. Along the Euphrates, Speck experienced a lack of food and water, intense heat and being shot at regularly by locals. Further into his trip down the Euphrates River, Speck was stranded on a small island with a corpse, where he waited for a week for a storm to pass.

When he reached the Gulf, he continued to paddle along the coast of Iran where he stayed for six months waiting for a new kayak to arrive. However, during his wait, he contracted malaria, which stayed with him for the remainder of the voyage. Speck did not resume his voyage until September 1934, when he continued east through the Arabian Sea. After a few months, he arrived on the coast of British India, now Pakistan, where he stopped at various ports to trade stories of his voyage for food, water, and shelter. This publicity allowed him to fund the rest of his trip. Around this period, the Nazis took power in Germany and, as a result, rumours of Speck being a German spy began to spread. Various stories of his kayak being able to fly and dive led to him being arrested at his next port; however, he was released after two days and resumed his journey.

When Speck reached British Ceylon, now Sri Lanka, he spent three months there to avoid the monsoon season. After it passed, Speck was back on the water and reached Madras, now Chennai, where he obtained a new kayak. He then continued to travel along the coast of India until Calcutta, now Kolkata, in January 1936. A few months later, just off the Burmese coast, Speck kayaked through another monsoon. He was driven off course, and spent 30–40 hours paddling to get back on route.

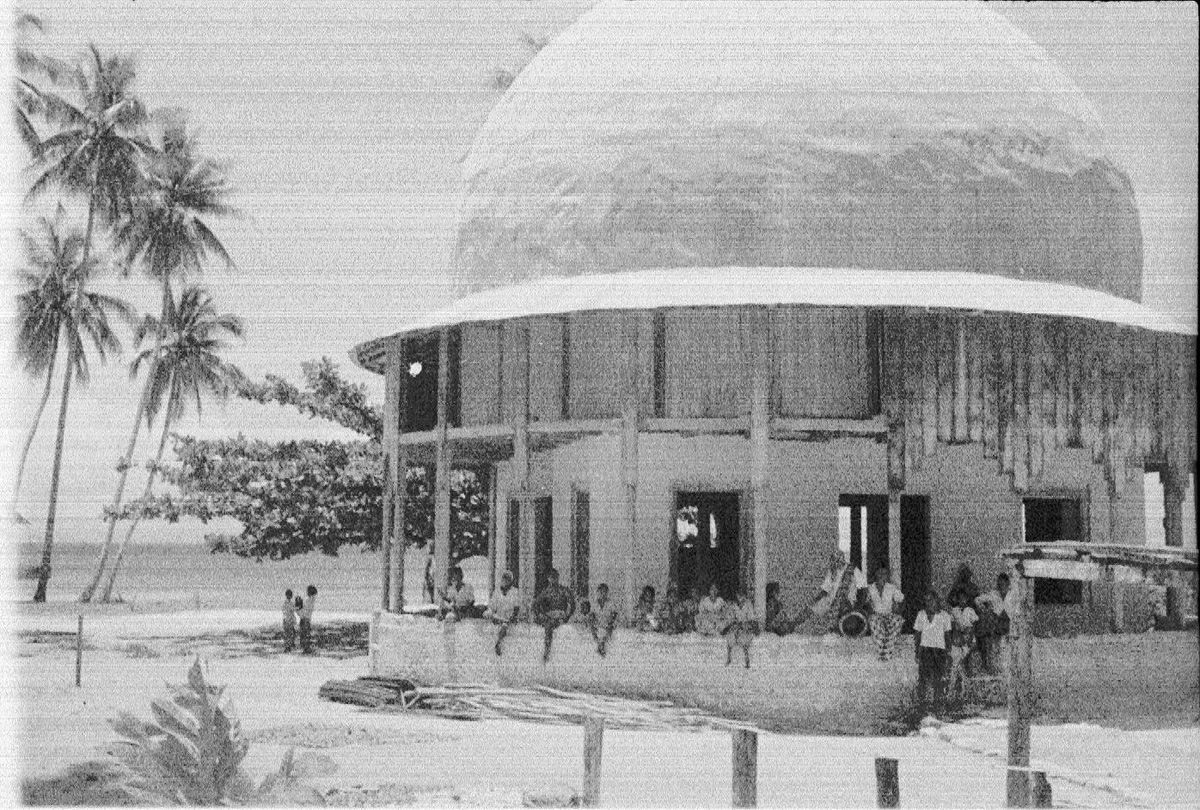
A mosque in Kai Besar, Maluku, Dutch Indies, photographed by Speck

After Speck left Singapore in another new kayak, he headed to Jakarta, from which he continued to paddle east. He was often dehydrated, exhausted, sunburnt, and short of food. During this stage in his voyage, Speck was struck down with malaria again and, as a result, the voyage was again interrupted. During this period, locals who were initially welcoming, would turn hostile due to the language barrier. In Indonesia he was beaten by 20 men, leaving him semi-conscious with a punctured eardrum. Speck managed to escape by chewing through the hide ropes he was tied with before sailing away in his kayak. Speck's recount on this incident as documented in the Australasian Post Magazine:

"The other natives closed in. Five or six of them held me down, half in and half out of the kayak. They all clung to me like leeches. Strong hands clutched my hair. With the strength of despair I tore one hand free from them and strove to pull the hands from my throat... With strips of dried buffalo hide some of them tied my legs and hands, while others looted the kayak. By the hair, they dragged my trussed body some yards across the sand. They constantly kicked me. They picked me up, carried me a short distance, then dropped me a few yards from the water."

Back out at sea, he was not permitted to travel a shorter route, but rather a longer via the north of New Guinea. Speck reached Port Moresby in August, before continuing to Daru and Saibai Island, north of Australia, in September 1939. The voyage took him seven years and four months.

== After the journey ==
Upon arrival on Thursday Island in Torres Strait, a group of locals welcomed him, but he was arrested by three police officers and sent to a prisoner-of-war camp due to his German background. The three officers welcomed and congratulated Speck as documented as in the Australasian Post Magazine:

"Well done, feller... You've made it — Germany to Australia in that. But now we've got a piece of bad news for you. You are an enemy alien. We are going to intern you."

Speck was first sent to a prisoner-of-war camp on Thursday Island for one month. He was then sent to Brisbane, then to Tatura Internment camp in Victoria where he escaped, but was recaptured and sent to Loveday Camp 14 in South Australia where he stayed until the end of the war.

Speck was released in January 1946 and, within a week of his release, found work in an opal mine in Lightning Ridge, New South Wales. He obtained his citizenship and settled into postwar Australia to establish a successful opal cutting and trading business. In the 1970s, Speck built his own home in Killcare Heights on the New South Wales Central Coast before retiring. His partner, Nancy Steele, would commute from Sydney to Killcare every week for 30 years to see him until she moved in with him in 1993. In the 1970s, Speck also managed to travel back to Germany, but did not really enjoy it, so returned to Australia.

Speck died in 1993 aged 86 years of an undisclosed illness.

== Legacy ==
Although Speck's adventures were reported in Europe, few in Australia knew about his accomplishments. Shortly after his arrival in Australia, Speck planned on publishing his photographs and writing about his experiences, but he did not carry this out. Most of his photographs, letters, and journals remain in the Australian National Maritime Museum, and are available on their website.

One of Speck's double ended paddles from his voyage was presented to Carl Toovey as a trophy for the 100 mile Cruising Canoe Club’s Nepean Marathon on the Hawkesbury River in 1952. This was the first canoeing marathon to take place in Australia. Over time, Toovey and Speck became friends and began canoeing around Pittwater and Sydney Harbour together.

Speck's opinions on his popularity as documented in the Australasian Post Magazine:

“But would Australians recognise my authority to speak about it? In Germany, I was a recognised kayakist before 1932. As my voyage progressed and reports of it went home from Cyprus, from Greece, from India, I became acknowledged as the most experienced sea-going kayak expert in the world... But the mass of Australians did not know me at all — except, perhaps, as a name appearing from time to time in local newspapers which briefly recorded the progress of the earlier parts of my voyage.”

Sandy Robson is a woman from Western Australia who retraced Speck's voyage by using a sea-kayak to paddle approximately 23,000 kilometres. She started the voyage at the age of 42 and spent 5 and half years on her journey from Germany to Australia. In an interview with the Australian Broadcasting Corporation in 2016, she claimed that she was inspired by the voyage of German Oskar Speck in the late 1930s. Unlike Speck, she did not face political issues as Australian Border Force personnel were on hand to provide customs clearance; however, she encountered crocodiles, pirates, and malaria. Although Sandy Robson documented her voyage in detail on her blog ‘Sea Kayaker Sandy’, she claimed that like Speck, she also wants to write a book about her voyage. During her interview with The Australian Broadcasting Corporation she also claimed:

"I was just captured by the journey he made and inspired to relive that journey in modern times... I've tried also to take something into myself from each of the different cultures as I've travelled across the world... I've been in 20 different countries — there are really fantastic things in each of those cultures that I've experienced."
