= Yinkanie railway line =

Former railway line in South Australia

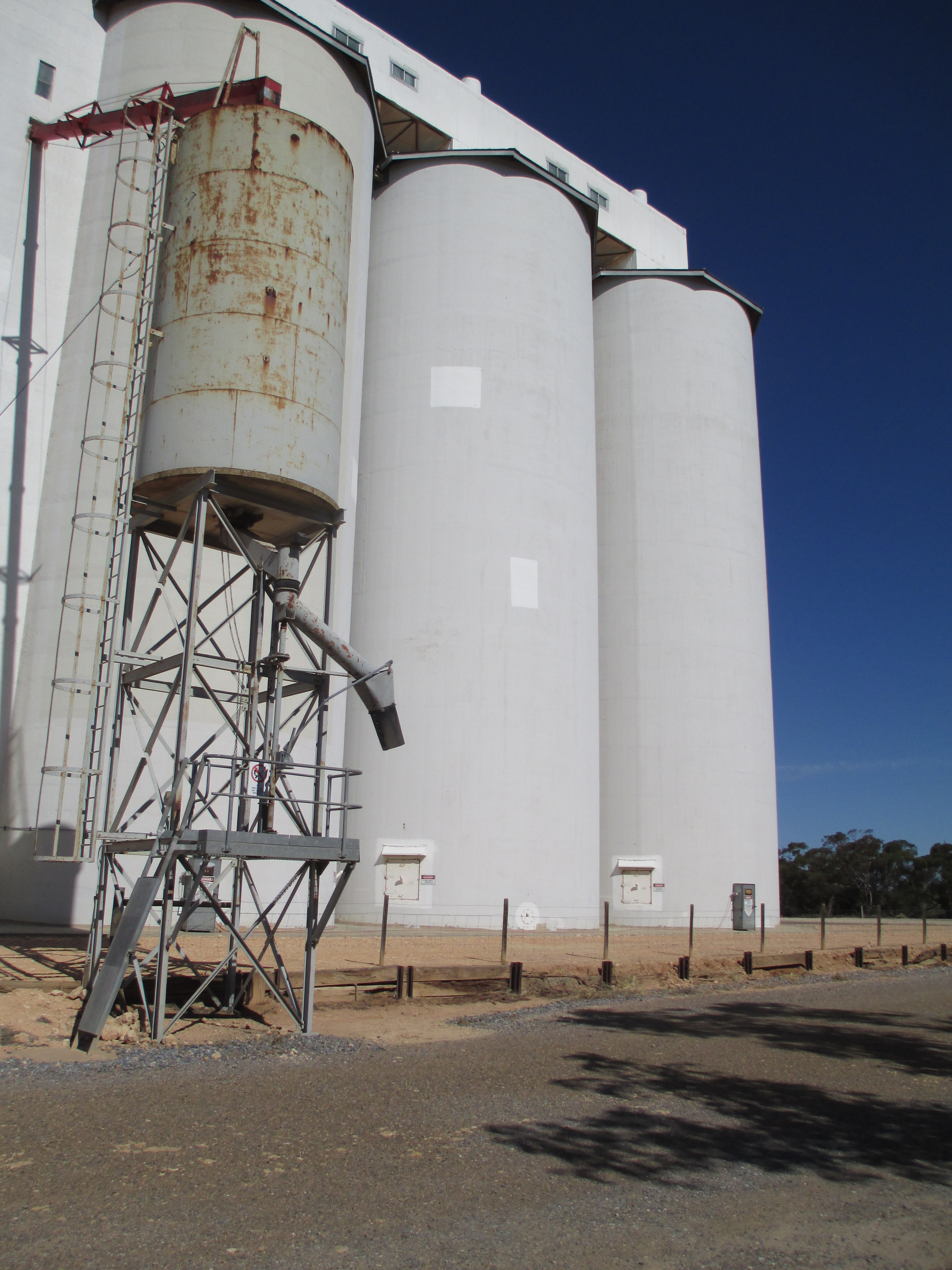
- Chute for loading bulk grain into trains at Wunkar (the only station on the line to have bulk storage and loading facilities) in 2015

Overview
- Status: Closed and removed
- Termini: Wanbi; Yinkanie
- Continues from: Barmera line

Service
- System: South Australian Railways

History
- Opened: 4 September 1925
- Closed: 1 May 1971

Technical
- Line length: 49.6 km (30.8 mi)
- Track gauge: 1600 mm (5 ft 3 in)

The Yinkanie railway line was a 50.6 kilometres (31.4 mi) railway line on the South Australian Railways network. Named the Wanbi to Moorook Railway in its enabling Act, it never reached its intended destination on the River Murray. The railway ran from a junction with the Barmera line at Wanbi northwards to Yinkanie, opening on 7 September 1925 and closing on 1 May 1971.

The six railway lines of the Murraylands
Order built	Line	Year opened	Year closed	Length (mi)	Length (km)
1	Tailem Bend–Pinnaroo	1906	2015^{[note a]}	86.6	139.4
2	Tailem Bend–Barmera	1913 / 1928^{[note b]}	1996^{[note c]}	159.5	256.6
3	Karoonda–Peebinga	1914	1990	66.0	106.2
4	Karoonda–Waikerie	1914	1994^{[note d]}	73.8	118.7
5	Alawoona–Loxton	1914	2015^{[note e]}	22.0	35.5
6	Wanbi–Yinkanie	1925	1971	31.5	50.6
Total				439.4	707.0
Notes: 1. Previously a broad-gauge through line into Victoria, the line was closed at the border in 1996 before being converted to standard gauge in 1998.; 2. Construction of the Barmera line was paused at Paringa in 1913 pending funding of a bridge over the River Murray. The line was completed to Barmera in 1928. A branch line was built to support construction of the proposed Chowilla Dam in 1966–67. Some 27.3 kilometres (17.0 miles) long, it branched from the Barmera line 8 kilometres (5 miles) south of Paringa and proceeded to Murtho on the south bank of the River Murray. Construction of the dam was deferred in 1967 and subsequently cancelled; later the line was removed without being used.; 3. Paringa–Barmera closed in 1984; Alawoona–Paringa closed in 1990; Tailem Bend–Alawoona closed in 1996.; 4. Galga–Waikerie closed in 1990.; 5. Converted to standard gauge in 1996.

== Route ==
The route of the line was designed to cover the gap between the Waikerie and Loxton lines at the lowest cost. The names of the new stations were Gluyas, Caliph, Bayah, Tuscan, Koowa, Wunkar, Myrla, Wappilka and Yinkanie.
