= Loveday Camp 9 =

Second World War prisoner of war camp in South Australia

Coordinates: 34°17′11″S 140°27′15″E

Camp 9 was one of three main prisoner of war and internee camps in South Australia (the others being Loveday Camp 10 and Loveday Camp 14). All were located at Loveday, in Riverland, approximately 30 kilometres from Renmark, with Camp 9 approximately 8 kilometres from Barmera.

The camp (also known as Italian Internee Camp No. 9) could hold up to 1,000 people, detaining Italian civilian internees, and later Italian prisoners of war.

The camp began operations on 12 August 1940, and the first Italian POW arrived at the camp on 11 June 1941. The camp guard was provided by members of 25/33 Garrison Battalion, a militia unit of the Australian Army. Many internees were released from the camp in 1944.

== See also ==
- List of POW camps in Australia
