= Loveday Camp 10 =

Second World War prisoner of war camp in South Australia

Coordinates: 34°17′11″S 140°27′15″E

Camp 10 was one of three main prisoner of war and internment camps in South Australia (the others being Loveday Camp 9 and Loveday Camp 14) which were used during WWII to contain both prisoners of war and civilians who happened to be of German, Italian, or Japanese heritage. All three camps were located near Loveday, in Riverland, with Camp 10 approximately 12 kilometres from Renmark.

The camp could hold up to 1,000 people and also held the camp headquarters and 39 buildings, including the hospital. The first Italian prisoner arrived at the camp on 12 August 1941. The camp guard was provided by members of 25/33 Garrison Battalion, a militia unit of the Australian Army.

This camp was also involved in greater world affairs during WWII. German nationals, who had been detained in Iran after the British and Soviet invasion were deported here. In retaliation, the Germans interned a number of British nationals from the Channel Islands and sent them to southern Germany.

== See also ==
- Ilag
- List of POW camps in Australia
