= Loveday Camp 14 =

Second World War prisoner of war camp in South Australia

Coordinates: 34°17′11″S 140°27′15″E

Camp 14 was one of three main prisoner of war and internee camps in South Australia (the others being Loveday Camp 9 and Loveday Camp 10). All were located at Loveday, in South Australia's Riverland, approximately 30 kilometres from Renmark.

== Details ==
The camp was divided into four compounds and held Axis prisoners from various battlefields around the world, including Papua New Guinea, the Pacific, the Middle East and North Africa. Many of the inmates were civilian internees and not part of the military. The camp guard was provided by members of 25/33 Garrison Battalion, a militia unit of the Australian Army.

The four compounds were numbered, and prisoners were divided into their specific nationalities. 14A held Italian prisoners, 14B and 14C held Japanese prisoners and 14D held German and Italian prisoners. At different times, the groupings were different. Prisoners first started to arrive at Camp 14 between the months of January and February 1942. From November 1941 until January 1944, 14A held German civilians.

Its most famous inmate was Oskar Speck, a German kayaker who paddled from Germany to New Guinea in the 1930s. In September 1939, he was detained as an enemy alien on Thursday Island and was interned in Brisbane, then in Tatura, but after escaping and being recaptured in 1943, he was sent to Camp 14. Another well-known internee was Italian anti-fascist activist Francesco Fantin who was killed in 1942 by pro-fascist inmates. Fantin was the only known death due to murder in the camp.

The camp officially closed in 1946, when the last prisoners were repatriated to their home countries.

== See also ==
- List of POW camps in Australia
- Italian prisoners of war in Australia
