= Kingston on Murray, South Australia =

Kingston on Murray
- Town
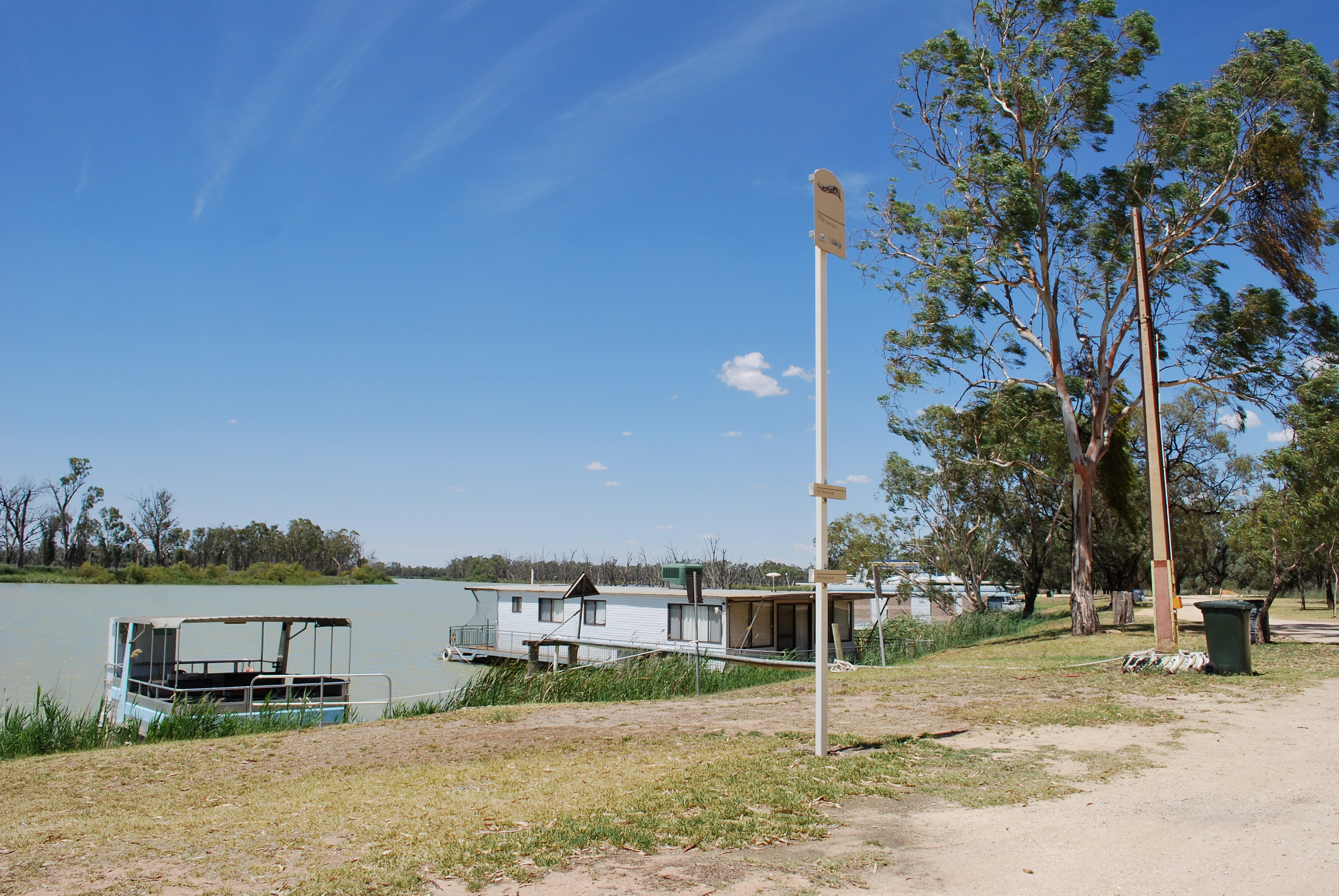
- Houseboats on the River Murray at Kingston on Murray

- Coordinates: 34°13′23″S 140°20′39″E
- Country: Australia
- State: South Australia
- LGA: District Council of Loxton Waikerie
- Location: 238 km (148 mi) NE of Adelaide; 44 km (27 mi) W of Renmark; 13 km (8.1 mi) W of Barmera
- Established: 21 November 1918 (town); 28 September 2000 (locality)

Government
  - State electorate: Chaffey
  - Federal division: Barker

Population
  - Total: 312 (SAL 2021)
- Time zone: UTC+9:30 (ACST)
  - Summer (DST): UTC+10:30 (ACST)
- Postcode: 5331
- County: Albert
- Mean max temp: 26.0 °C (78.8 °F)
- Mean min temp: 9.7 °C (49.5 °F)
- Annual rainfall: 238.5 mm (9.39 in)
Localities around Kingston on Murray
Overland Corner; Wigley Flat	Overland Corner	Overland Corner
Wigley Flat; Woolpunda	Kingston on Murray	Overland Corner
Woolpunda	Woolpunda; Moorook; Cobdogla	Cobdogla

Kingston on Murray (formerly Thurk and Kingston O.M.) is a town on the south bank of the River Murray (Note: Historically, South Australian usage (for example, in legislation, newspapers, maps and everyday speech) has been to refer to the River Murray rather than Murray River, and similarly with the other significant river in the state, the River Torrens. This word order is not frequently followed in the other Australian states.) in the Riverland region of South Australia. Its name is derived from Charles Kingston, who was Premier of South Australia from 1893 to 1899. At the 2021 census, the town had a population of 312.

== History ==
The town was surveyed in January 1915 and originally proclaimed as Thurk on 21 November 1918. Its declared size was reduced on 19 July 1934 and again on 13 July 1939.

The town's original name was derived from Thurk Homestead; the word Thurk is itself derived from an Aboriginal word, tharko, that means mouth. On 19 September 1940, the name was changed to Kingston O.M. – the initials standing for "on Murray", thereby distinguishing itself from the larger town of Kingston SE in the south-east of the state. "Kingston" derived from Charles Kingston, the Premier of South Australia at the time, after whom the Kingston Village Settlement Area had been named on being established in 1896.

Subsequently, residents requested a name change to expand "O.M." to become Kingston on Murray, and that name was gazetted on 31 March 1994. (Note: This gazette notice erroneously included hyphens in the name. A correction, to "Kingston on Murray" (capitalised thus), was gazetted on 24 November 1994; the Notice to Assign of 31 March remains the authority.)

Boundaries for the locality, as distinct from the town, of Kingston on Murray, which were promulgated on 28 September 2000, include the town and the sites of the Kingston Ferry shack.

== River crossing ==
The Sturt Highway now bypasses the town and crosses the River Murray over a bridge. Before the bridge was opened in 1973, two vehicular cable ferries carried road traffic over the river.

== Governance ==
Kingston on Murray is in the District Council of Loxton Waikerie, the state electoral district of Chaffey and the federal Division of Barker.

== Landmarks ==
Kingston Estate and Accolade Wines' Banrock Station brand have wineries near Kingston on Murray. The 1375-hectare (5.3-square-mile) Banrock Station Wetland Complex is listed under the Ramsar Convention for the conservation and sustainable utilisation of wetlands.

The ruins of the historically significant Kingston on Murray pump site and feeder tank are listed on the South Australian Heritage Register.

== See also ==
- List of crossings of the River Murray.
